= Anglo-Indian reserved seat in the Kerala Legislative Assembly =

Former reserved seat in the Kerala Legislative Assembly

Between 1952 and 2020, a single seat was reserved in the Kerala Legislative Assembly, for members of the Anglo-Indian community. This member was nominated by the Governor of Kerala on the advice of the Government of Kerala. In January 2020, the Anglo-Indian reserved seats in the Lok Sabha and state legislative assemblies of India were discontinued by the 126th Constitutional Amendment Bill of 2019, when enacted as the 104th Constitutional Amendment Act, 2019.

The Article 331 of the Indian Constitution gave reservation to the Anglo-Indian community during the creation of the Constitution, the article 331 also says that this reservation would cease to exist 10 years after the commencement of the Constitution. But this reservation was extended to 1970 through the 8th Amendment. The period of reservation was extended to 1980 through 23rd amendment and then to 1990 through 45th amendments, to 2006 through 62nd amendment, to 2010 through 79th amendments and to 2020 through the 95th Amendment.

== Members ==
The following is a list of members nominated after each election.

Election	Name	Assembly
1957	William Hamilton D'Cruz	1st
1960	C. F. Pereira	2nd
1965	Vacant	President's Rule
1967	S. P. Luiz	3rd
1970	Stephen Padua	4th
1977	Stephen Padua	5th
1980	Stephen Padua	6th
1982	Stephen Padua	7th
1987	Nicolas Rodriguez	8th
1991	David Pinheiro	9th
1996	John Fernandez	10th
2001	Ludy Luiz	11th
2006	Simon Britto Rodrigues	12th
2011	Ludy Luiz	13th
2016	John Fernandez	14th

== See also ==
- Anglo-Indian reserved seats in the Lok Sabha
- Reserved political positions in India
