= 7th Kerala Assembly =

1982–1987 Kerala Assembly term

| ← | 6th | 8th | → |

Overview
- Legislative body: Kerala Legislative Assembly
- Term: 24 May 1982 – 25 March 1987
- Election: 1982 Kerala Legislative Assembly election
- Government: Third Karunakaran ministry
- Opposition: LDF
- Members: 140
- Speaker: Vakkom Purushothaman (until 1984); V. M. Sudheeran (1985-1986)
- Deputy Speaker: K. M. Hamza Kunju
- Leader of the House: K. Karunakaran
- Leader of the Opposition: E. K. Nayanar
- Party control: UDF

The 7th Assembly of Kerala was elected in the 1982 Kerala Legislative Assembly election. The Speaker of the assembly was Vakkom Purushothaman until December 1984 followed by V. M. Sudheeran until the end of the term. The Deputy Speaker was K. M. Hamza Kunju. The leader of the Assembly was K. Karunakaran from the Indian National Congress. The leader of opposition was E. K. Nayanar of the Communist Party of India (Marxist). The Assembly had 14 sessions with 249 days of sittings. A total of 79 bills were passed during this period.

== Members ==
| Sl. No: | Constituency | Name | Party |
|---|---|---|---|
| 1 | Manjeshwar | | |
| 2 | Kasaragod | | |
| 3 | Udma | | |
| 4 | Hosdrug (SC) | | |
| 5 | Trikkarpur | | |
| 6 | Irikkur | | |
| 7 | Payyanur | | |
| 8 | Taliparamba | | |
| 9 | Azhikode | | |
| 10 | Cannanore | | |
| 11 | Edakkad | | |
| 12 | Tellicherry | | |
| 13 | Peringalam | | |
| 14 | Kuthuparamba | | |
| 15 | Peravoor | | |
| 16 | North Wynad (ST) | | |
| 17 | Badagara | | |
| 18 | Nadapuram | | |
| 19 | Meppayur | | |
| 20 | Quilandy | | |
| 21 | Perambra | | |
| 22 | Balusseri | | |
| 23 | Koduvally | | |
| 24 | Calicut-I | | |
| 25 | Calicut-II | | |
| 26 | Beypore | | |
| 27 | Kunnamangalam (SC) | | |
| 28 | Thiruvambady | | |
| 29 | Kalpetta | | |
| 30 | Sulthan Bathery | | |
| 31 | Wandoor (SC) | | |
| 32 | Nilambur | | |
| 33 | Manjeri | | |
| 34 | Malappuram | | |
| 35 | Kondotty | | |
| 36 | Tirurangadi | | |
| 37 | Tanur | | |
| 38 | Tirur | | |
| 39 | Ponnani | | |
| 40 | Kuttipuram | | |
| 41 | Mankada | | |
| 42 | Perinthalmanna | | |
| 43 | Thrithala | | |
| 44 | Pattambi | | |
| 45 | Ottapalam | | |
| 46 | Sreekrishnapuram | | |
| 47 | Mannarkkad | | |
| 48 | Malampuzha | | |
| 49 | Palghat | | |
| 50 | Chittur | | |
| 51 | Kollengode Shornur | | |
| 52 | Coyalmannam (SC) | | |
| 53 | Alathur | | |
| 54 | Chelakkara | | |
| 55 | Wadakkanchery | | |
| 56 | Kunnamkulam | | |
| 57 | Cherpu | | |
| 58 | Trichur | | |
| 59 | Ollur | | |
| 60 | Kodakara | | |
| 61 | Chalakudy | | |
| 62 | Mala | | |
| 63 | Irinjalakuda | | |
| 64 | Manalur | | |
| 65 | Guruvayoor | | |
| 66 | Nattika | | |
| 67 | Kodungallur | | |
| 68 | Angamaly | | |
| 69 | Vadakkekara | | |
| 70 | Parur | | |
| 71 | Narakal (SC) | | |
| 72 | Ernakulam | | |
| 73 | Mattancherry | | |
| 74 | Palluruthy | | |
| 75 | Trippunithura | | |
| 76 | Alwaye | | |
| 77 | Perumbavoor | | |
| 78 | Kunnathunad | | |
| 79 | Piravom | | |
| 80 | Muvattupuzha | | |
| 81 | Kothamangalam | | |
| 82 | Thodupuzha | | |
| 83 | Devikulam | | |
| 84 | Idukki | | |
| 88 | Udumbanchola | | |
| 86 | Peerumade | | |
| 87 | Kanjirappally | | |
| 88 | Vazhoor | | |
| 89 | Changanassery | | |
| 90 | Kottayam | | |
| 91 | Ettumanoor | | |
| 92 | Puthuppally | | |
| 93 | Poonjar | | |
| 94 | Pala | | |
| 95 | Kaduthuruthy | | |
| 96 | Vaikom | | |
| 97 | Aroor | | |
| 98 | Cherthala | | |
| 99 | Mararikulam | | |
| 100 | Alappuzha | | |
| 101 | Ambalappuzha | | |
| 102 | Kuttanad | | |
| 103 | Haripad | | |
| 104 | Kayamkulam | | |
| 105 | Thiruvalla | | |
| 106 | Kallooppara | | |
| 107 | Aranmula | | |
| 108 | Chengannur | | |
| 109 | Mavelikara | | |
| 110 | Pandalam (SC) | | |
| 111 | Ranni | | |
| 112 | Pathanamthitta | | |
| 113 | Konni | | |
| 114 | Pathanapuram | | |
| 115 | Punalur | | |
| 116 | Chadayamangalam | | |
| 117 | Kottarakkara | | |
| 118 | Neduvathur (SC) | | |
| 119 | Adoor | | |
| 120 | Kunnathur | | |
| 121 | Karunagappally | | |
| 122 | Chavara | | |
| 123 | Kundara | | |
| 124 | Kollam | | |
| 125 | Eravipuram | | |
| 126 | Chathannoor | | |
| 127 | Varkala | | |
| 128 | Attingal | | |
| 129 | Kilimanoor (SC) | | |
| 130 | Vamanapuram | | |
| 131 | Ariyanad | | |
| 132 | Nedumangad | | |
| 133 | Kazhakoottam | | |
| 134 | Trivandrum North | | |
| 135 | Trivandrum West | | |
| 136 | Trivandrum East | | |
| 137 | Nemom | | |
| 138 | Kovalam | | |
| 139 | Neyyattinkara | | |
| 140 | Parassala | | |
