= 2nd Kerala Assembly =

1960–1964 Kerala Assembly term

←	1st	3rd	→

Overview
- Legislative body: Kerala Legislative Assembly
- Election: 1960 Kerala Legislative Assembly election
- Government: Pattom A. Thanu Pillai ministry (1960–1962); Sankar ministry (1962–1964)
- Opposition: CPI
- Members: 133
- Speaker: K. M. Seethi Sahib (1960–1961); C. H. Mohammed Koya (1961); Alexander Parambithara (1961–1964)
- Leader of the House: Pattom A. Thanu Pillai (1960–1962); R. Sankar (1962–1964)
- Leader of the Opposition: E. M. S. Namboodiripad
- Party control: INC

The Kerala Legislative Assembly, popularly known as the Niyamasabha (lit. 'Law Council'), is the State Assembly of Kerala, one of the 28 States in India. The Assembly is formed by 140 elected representatives. Each elected member represents one of the 140 constituencies within the borders of Kerala and is referred to as Member of the Legislative Assembly (MLA). The 14th Kerala Legislative Assembly consists of 140 elected members and one member nominated by the governor from the Anglo-Indian Community.

== Members ==
Sl. No:	Constituency	Name	Party
1	Manjeshwar		
2	Kasaragod		
3	Hosdrug		
4	Nileswar		
5	Edakkad		
6	Cannanore		
7	Madayi		
8	Payyanur		
9	Taliparamba		
10	Irikkur		
11	Kuthuparamba		
12	Tellicherry		
13	Peringalam		
14	North Wynad (ST)		
15	Badagara		
16	Nadapuram		
17	Meppayur		
18	Quilandy		
19	Perambra		
20	Balusseri		
21	Kunnamangalam (SC)		
22	Kalpetta		
23	South Wynad (ST)		
24	Calicut-I		
25	Calicut-II		
26	Beypore		
27	Tirurangadi		
28	Tanur		
29	Tirur		
30	Mankada		
31	Kondotty		
32	Malappuram		
33	Manjeri (SC)		
34	Nilambur		
35	Perinthalmanna		
36	Ponnani		
37	Trithala (SC)		
38	Kuttipuram		
39	Pattambi		
40	Ottapalam		
41	Sreekrishnapuram		
42	Mannarghat		
43	Palghat		
44	Malampuzha		
45	Chittur		
46	Kollengode		
47	Alathur		
48	Kuzhalmannam (SC)		
49	Chelakkara		
50	Wadakkancherry		
51	Kunnamkulam		
52	Manalur		
53	Trichur		
54	Ollur		
55	Irinjalakuda		
56	Kodakara		
57	Chalakudy		
58	Mala		
59	Guruvayur		
60	Nattika		
61	Craganore		
62	Ankamaly		
63	Vadakkekara		
64	Parur		
65	Narakal		
66	Mattancherry		
67	Palluruthy		
68	Thrippunithura		
69	Ernakulam		
70	Alwaye		
71	Perumbavoor		
72	Kunnathunad (SC)		
73	Kothamangalam		
74	Muvattupuzha		
75	Thodupuzha		
76	Karimannyor		
77	Devicolam (SC)		
78	Udumbanchola		
79	Peermade (SC)		
80	Kanjirappally		
81	Vazhoor		
82	Changanassery		
83	Puthuppally		
84	Kottayam		
85	Ettumanoor		
86	Akalakunnam		
87	Poonjar		
88	Palai		
89	Kaduthuruthy		
90	Vaikom		
91	Aroor		
92	Cherthala		
93	Mararikulam		
94	Alleppey		
95	Ambalapuzha		
96	Kuttanad		
97	Haripad		
98	Kayamkulam		
99	Thiruvalla		
100	Kallooppara		
101	Aranmula		
102	Chengannur		
103	Mavelikara		
104	Pandalam (SC)		
105	Ranni		
106	Pathanamthitta		
107	Konni		
108	Pathanapuram		
109	Punalur		
110	Chadayamangalam		
111	Kottarakkara		
112	Kunnathur		
113	Adoor		
114	Krishnapuram		
115	Karunagappally		
116	Suilon		
117	Kundara		
118	Eravipuram		
119	Chathannoor		
120	Varkala		
121	Attingal		
122	Kilimanoor (SC)		
123	Vamanapuram		
124	Ariyanad		
125	Nedumangad		
126	Kazhakuttam		
127	Trivandrum North		
128	Trivandrum West		
129	Nemom		
130	Kovalam		
131	Vilappil		
132	Neyyattinkara		
133	Parassala		
