= Gopinathpur =

Gopinathpur may refer to any of the following villages:

== Bangladesh ==
- Gopinathpur, Bangladesh

== India ==
- Gopinathpur, Baleshwar, Baleshwar district, Odisha
- Gopinathpur, Golanthara, Golanthara, Ganjam district, Odisha
- Gopinathpur, Hinjili, Hinjili municipality, Ganjam district, Odisha
- Gopinathpur, Tarasingi, Tarasingi, Ganjam district, Odisha
- Gopinathpur, West Bengal, Purba Bardhaman district, West Bengal, India

== See also ==
- Gopinath (disambiguation)
