= Gopinath =

Gopinath may refer to:

== Given name ==
- Gopinath Bordoloi (1890–1950), Indian politician from Assam
- Gopinath Das, Indian politician from Assam
- Gopinath Kallianpur (1925–2015), Indian-American mathematician
- Gopinath Kartha (1927–1984), crystallographer
- Gopinath Kaviraj (1887–1976), Sanskrit scholar and philosopher
- Gopinath Mohanty (1914–1991), Odia author
- Gopinath Munde (1949–2014), Indian politician from Maharashtra
- Gopinath Muthukad (born 1964), magician
- Gopinath Panigrahi (1924–2004), botanist
- Gopinath Pillai (born 1937), Singaporean diplomat
- Gopinath Saha (1906–1924), freedom fighter
- T. A. Gopinatha Rao (1872–1919), Indian archaeologist and epigraphist

== Surname ==
- Gita Gopinath (born 1971), Indian-American economist
- Juliet Gopinath (born 1976), American optical engineer
- Maganti Gopinath (1963–2025), Indian politician from Telangana state

== Temples ==
- Gopinath Mandir, a Hindu temple in Uttarakhand
- Gopinath Temple, Pabna
- Shri Radha Gopinath Ji Temple, a Hindu temple in Jaipur

== Others ==
- Gopinath (god), an incarnation of Lord Krishna
- Gopinath (film), a 1948 Bollywood film

== See also ==
- Gopinathpur (disambiguation)
- Gopinathan, alternative form of the Indian male given name
