= U. A. Latheef =

Legislator

U. A. Latheef MLA
- യു എ ലത്തീഫ്

Member of the Kerala Legislative Assembly for Manjeri
- In office 2021–2026
- Preceded by: M. Ummer
- Succeeded by: M. Rahmathulla

Personal details
- Born: Manjeri
- Party: Indian Union Muslim League
- Education: Bachelor of Laws from Government Law College, Ernakulam in 1973

U. A. Latheef is an Indian politician belonging to Indian Union Muslim League. He was the member of Kerala Legislative Assembly from Manjeri from 2 May 2021 to 23 May 2026.

== Early life ==
U. A. Latheef was born to Muhammad Haji at Manjeri around 1949. He was graduated as a Bachelor of Laws from Government Law College, Ernakulam in the year 1973. He is an Advocate by profession.

== Political career ==
Earlier, U. A. Latheef had been the district general secretary of IUML and the district convener of UDF from the district of Malappuram. Due to the end of term of the last sitting MLA M. Ummer, Manjeri went to poll as a part of 2021 Kerala general election on 6 April 2021. U. A. Latheef was the candidate fielded by UDF from Manjeri. There were 206,960 registered voters in Manjeri Constituency for the election. U. A. Latheef won the election by a margin of 14,573 votes.

== Election performance ==
2021 Kerala Legislative Assembly election: Manjeri
| Party | Candidate | Votes | % | ±% |
|---|---|---|---|---|
| IUML | U. A. Latheef | 78,836 | 50.22% | Steady |
| CPI | Nazar Debona | 64,263 | 40.93% | ▲4.83 |
| BJP | P. R. Rashmilnath | 11,350 | 7.23% | ▼0.85 |
| Independent | Palathingal Aboobacker | 1,341 | 0.85% | N/A |
| NOTA | None of the above | 1,202 | 0.77% | ▲0.11 |
| Margin of victory | | 14,573 | 9.29% | ▼4.83 |
| Turnout | | 1,53,811 | 74.32% | ▲1.30 |
| IUML hold | | Swing | Steady | |
