= Gopinathan =

Gopinathan is a name which was used in Southern States of India like Kerala, Tamil Nadu, Karnataka and Andhra Pradesh in the 1950s and 1960s among the progressive Hindu families. The name is derived from the Lord Krishna, who is considered to be a hero in protecting young girls. He is called Nathan, meaning the Gopika's' (Girls') dream hero. The name lost its prominence to modern names since the 1970s.

== Given name ==
Notable people with Gopinathan as a given name include:

- Gopinathan Ramachandra (born 1989), a Malaysian footballer
- Gopinathan Pillai (1921–2002), an Indian politician

== Surname ==
Notable people with Gopinathan as a surname include:

- Rajesh Gopinathan (born 1971), Indian Executive
- K. Gopinathan, Indian filmmaker
- P. Gopinathan Nair (1922 – 2022), Indian social worker
- P. Gopinathan, Indian master weaver
- Indumati Gopinathan, (born 1956) noted Indian pathologist
- Asha Gopinathan, actress from Malayalee House
