= K. M. Abraham =

K. M. Abraham may refer to:

- K. M. Abraham (politician) (1919–2006), Indian politician
- K. M. Abraham (civil servant) (born 1958), Indian civil servant
- K. M. Abraham (scientist) (born 1945), American scientist
