= P. P. George (CPI politician) =

Indian politician

Member of Kerala Legislative Assembly
- In office 1977–1980
- Preceded by: M. Thomas
- Succeeded by: K. M. Abraham
- Constituency: Kottayam

Personal details
- Born: 18 February 1919
- Died: 24 January 1979 (aged 59)
- Party: Communist Party of India
- Spouse: Aliyamma
- Children: One son and one daughter
- Parent: Punnan (father)

P. Punnan George (18 February 1919—24 January 1979) was a leader of the Communist Party of India and Member of the Legislative Assembly from Kottayam in 1977.
