= M. Ummer =

Indian politician

Member of Kerala Assembly
- In office 2011–2021
- Preceded by: P. K. Abdu Rabb
- Succeeded by: U. A. Latheef
- Constituency: Manjeri
- In office 2006–2011
- Preceded by: M. K. Muneer
- Succeeded by: P. Ubaidulla
- Constituency: Malappuram

Personal details
- Party: Indian Union Muslim League

M. Ummer (born 1 July 1953) is an Indian politician and social worker from Kerala, India. He is a Member of Legislative Assembly from the Manjeri constituency in Malappuram district. He started his political career through the Indian Union Muslim League.

== Early life and education ==
Ummer was born the son of M. Moideen Haji and Smt. Ayisha; born at Karuvarakundu. He has completed a Bachelor of Laws (LLB) degree.

== Positions held ==
He is the active worker of Indian union Muslim League and also was President, District Panchayat, Malappuram; Chairman, District Panchayat Welfare Standing Committee; President, Karuvarakundu Grama Panchayat; Treasurer, Muslim League District Committee; Director, K.M.M.L.Now, Working Committee Member, Kerala State Muslim League; Member, Wakf Board; Secretary, Darul Najath Orphanage and allied institutions.
