= Rajah Motors =

Automobile manufacturer in Chavakkad, Kerala, India

Rajah Motors was an automobile manufacturer based in the city of Chavakkad, in Thrissur District of Kerala, India. Founded in 1981, they built Kazwa vans and multi-purpose vehicles in a joint venture with Hindustan Motors, and planned for an annual output of 50 to 150 cars. They also built Moover pickup trucks, and from 2003, a series of three- and four-wheeled pickups called Tiger and Kangaroo. These latter vehicles, designed in conjunction with Chinese company Shamshong Jolan, were aimed at the rural market where cargo transportation is challenging. The company is no longer trading.
