= P. K. Koru =

Indian politician

Member of the Kerala Legislative Assembly
- Succeeded by: K.G Karunakara Menon
- Constituency: Guruvayur

Personal details
- Born: 15 January 1890
- Died: 16 January 1968

Koru Kooliyat, popularly known as P. K Koru (15 January 1890 – 16 January 1968) was an Indian politician. He represented Guruvayur in the first Kerala legislative assembly. He entered the first Kerala Legislative Assembly as an independent with the support of Communist Party of India (CPI). Koru worked as a teacher in his early days contested as an independent with the support of the Communist Party and won with a margin of 2635 votes.
