= Kadalaayimana =

Kadalaayimana is an Illam (House of Nampoothiris-Kerala Brahmins) in the Chavakkad (Chowghat) taluk, Thrissur (Trichur) district, Kerala, India. The Mana, or Illam, is situated near Vylathur, on the Guruvayur-Ponnani route, via Punnayoorkulam, near the junction where the road from Kunnamkulam meets, about 6 kilometres (3.7 mi) away from Guruvayur and Kunnamkulam. It is built on the Naalukettu pattern, based on Vastu shastra, a traditional Hindu system of architecture.
