= Pazhakulam Madhu =

Indian politician

Pazhakulam Madhu is an Indian politician from Kerala. He is a member of the Kerala Legislative Assembly from Ranni representing the Indian National Congress.

== 2026 Assembly Election ==
Kerala Legislative Assembly Election, 2026: Ranni
Party	Candidate	Votes	%	±%
INC	Pazhakulam Madhu	54,652	44.13%	
KC(M)	Pramod Narayan	50,308	40.62%	
Twenty 20 Party	Thomas K Samuel (Blesson)	17,993	14.53%	
Independent	Sreehari K P	333	0.27%	
NOTA	None of the Above	557	0.45%	
Majority		4,344	3.51%	
Turnout		1,23,843		
Registered electors				
INC gain from KC(M)		Swing		
