= Raju Abraham =

Indian politician

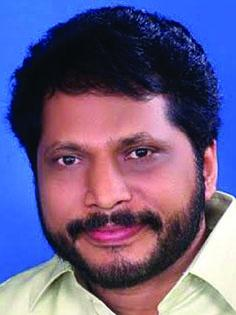

Member of the Kerala Legislative Assembly
- In office 1996–2021
- Preceded by: M. C. Cherian
- Succeeded by: Pramod Narayan
- Constituency: Ranni

Personal details
- Born: 30 June 1961 (age 65) Ranni, Kerala, India
- Party: Communist Party of India (Marxist)
- Spouse: Teena Abraham
- Children: Two sons and one daughter

Raju Abraham (born 30 June 1961) is an Indian politician who represented the Ranni constituency in the Kerala Legislative Assembly. Abraham was elected as the district secretary of CPI(M) Pathanamthitta in 2024. He was elected to the Kerala Legislative Assembly for five consecutive terms in 1996, 2001, 2006, 2011, and 2016.

Raju Abraham entered politics as a cadre of Students' Federation of India. He was the Unit Secretary of SFI in M.S. High School, Ranni during 1975). Later, Abraham was elected as the Chairman of St. Thomas College, Ranni in 1980 and the Kerala University Union Councillor in 1981. He held positions such as the president of SFI Pathanamthitta Taluk Committee and a member of SFI Kollam district committee.

He was elected to CPI(M) Ranni Taluk Committee in 1983. He has been working as a district committee member and district secretariat member of the party in Pathanamthitta from 1991 and 1996 respectively. He is also associated with Centre of Indian Trade Unions. He was the president of Ranni Taluk Quarry Workers Union in 1982 and president of Ranni Taluk Auto, Taxi, Tempo, Lorry Union in 1995. Later he became the president of the Pathanamthitta District Private Motor Workers Union.
