= N. K. Akbar =

Indian politician

Member of the Kerala Legislative Assembly for Guruvayur
- Incumbent
- Assumed office May 2021
- Preceded by: K. V. Abdul Khader

Personal details
- Born: Kerala
- Party: Communist Party of India (Marxist)

N. K. Akbar is an Indian politician serving as the MLA of Guruvayur Constituency since May 2021. He represents Guruvayur in the 16th Kerala State Legislative Assembly. Akbar holds a postgraduate degree in MA from Kannur University.
