= M. S. Arun Kumar =

Indian politician

Member of the Kerala Legislative Assembly for Mavelikkara
- Incumbent
- Assumed office May 2021

Personal details
- Born: Kallimel, Mavelikkara
- Party: Communist Party of India Marxist
- Spouse: Sneha Suresh
- Children: 1 (daughter)
- Education: Bishop Moore College, Mavelikkara

M. S. Arun Kumar is an Indian politician from Kerala, who currently serves as the MLA of Mavelikkara Constituency since May 2021.

== Personal life ==
M. S. Arunkumar studied at Pope Pius HSS, Kattanam and has an under graduate degree in Bachelor of Arts English degree from Bishop Moore College, Mavelikkara. He is currently pursuing Bachelor of Laws at the Kerala University. M. S. Arunkumar is married to Sneha Suresh and has a daughter, Alaida.

== Political career ==
M. S. Arunkumar contested the 2021 Kerala Legislative Assembly election from Mavelikkara assembly constituency and defeated K.K. Shaju of United Democratic Front (Kerala) by 24,717 votes.
