= Pramod Narayan =

Indian politician

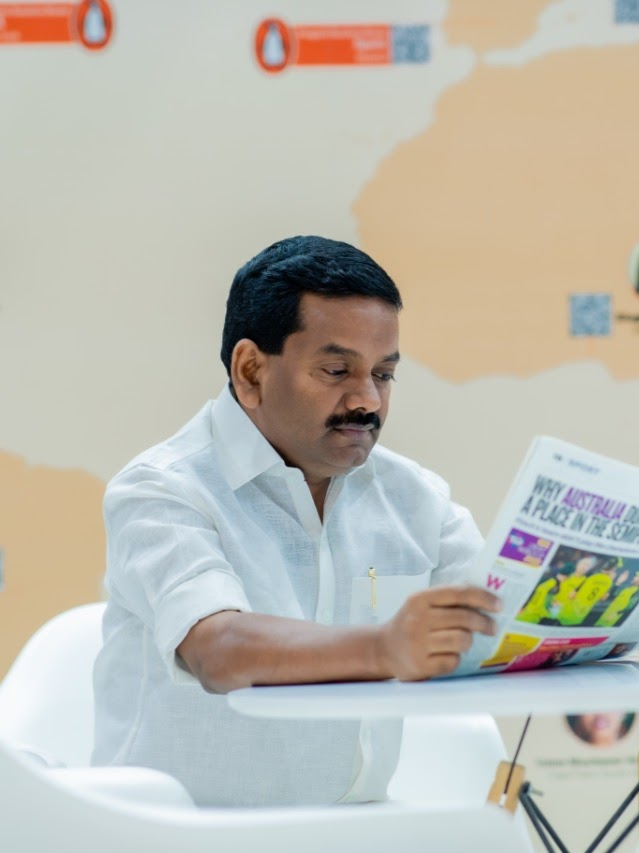

Member of the Kerala Legislative Assembly
- In office 24 May 2021 – 23 May 2026
- Preceded by: Raju Abraham
- Constituency: Ranni

Personal details
- Born: Palamel, Alappuzha, Kerala, India
- Party: Kerala Congress (M)
- Occupation: Lawyer; politician

Pramod Narayan is a Kerala Congress (M) MLA from Kerala. He belonged to Ranni constituency in Kerala. He won the constituency election in 2021 by 1280 votes. He is an advocate by profession and a state secretary of Kerala Congress (M).

== Personal life ==
His grandfather P. K. Balakrishna Pillai was a freedom fighter and an early member of the Communist Party of India.

== Career ==
Pramod Narayan started his political career as a member of the Students' Federation of India. He was the Union General Secretary and a Senate Member of Kerala University and also the first state chairman of the Inter School Council.

Narayan was the President of Bharanikkavu block Panchayat as the candidate of the Communist Party of India (Marxist).
