= Gopinathpur, Baleswar =

Gopinathpur
- Village
- Location in Orissa, India Gopinathpur (India)
- Coordinates: 21°29′0″N 86°46′36″E
- Country: India
- State: Odisha
- District: Baleswar

Population (2011)
  - Total: 4,688

Languages
  - Official: Odia
- Time zone: UTC+5:30 (IST)
- PIN: 756045
- Vehicle registration: OD-01
- Sex ratio: 1.13 ♂/♀
- Literacy: 80%
- Vidhan Sabha constituency: Nilagiri
- Website: odisha.gov.in

Gopinathpur is a village in Baleswar Sadar subdistrict in Baleswar District in the Indian state of Odisha. As of 2001 it had a population of 986 in 240 households. The nearest major railway station is the Balasore railway station.

== Geography ==
The village is 3 km from Nilgiri.

== Economy ==
Most of the people depend on cultivation.
