= Thekkekara, Kerala =

Thekkekara
- village
- Location in Kerala, India Thekkekara (India)
- Coordinates: 9°12′0″N 76°30′0″E
- Country: India
- State: Kerala
- District: Alappuzha

Area
  - Total: 20 km^{2} (7.7 sq mi)
- Elevation: 62 m (203 ft)

Population (2011)
  - Total: 32,373
  - Density: 1,600/km^{2} (4,200/sq mi)

Languages
  - Official: Malayalam, English
- Time zone: UTC+5:30 (IST)
- PIN: 690107
- Telephone code: 0479
- Vehicle registration: KL
- Nearest city: Mavelikara, Kayankulam city
- Literacy: 92%
- Climate: mild winters and heavy downpour throughout the year (Köppen)

Thekkekara is a village in Alappuzha district in the Indian state of Kerala.The village is situated in Mavelikara South.

== Demographics ==
As of 2011 census, Thekkekara had a population of 32,373 with 14,948 males and 17,425 females.

== Geography ==
- God Own Land . Pleasant atmosphere everytime

== Services ==
- Post Office
- State bank of India
- Union bank of India
- Federal bank
- Village office
- Government Hospital
- Panchayath office
- Government Higher Secondary School
- Anaswara Arts and Sports Club, Pallarimangalam
- Pallarimangalam Kizhakk Haindava Kara
- Vathikulangara Devi Temple
- Mullikulangara Devi Temple
- Umbarnadu Sree Dharma Shastha Temple
- Pallarimangalam Sree Krishnaswami Temple
- Malimel Bhagavathi Temple
