= P. Gopinathan =

Indian master weaver of handloom textiles

- Born: Manjavilakom, Poovathur, Neyyattinkara, Kerala, India
- Occupation: Master weaver
- Known for: Handloom weaving
- Awards: Padma Shri; CNN-IBN Real Heroes Award

Padmanabhan Gopinathan is an Indian master weaver of handloom textiles and the founder of Eco Tex Handloom Consortium, an organization promoting handloom weaving in Manjavilakom, a small hamlet in Thiruvananthapuram, in the south Indian state of Kerala. Under the aegis of the organization, he provides employment to over 1800 women in the village. The Government of India awarded him the fourth highest civilian honour of the Padma Shri, in 2007, for his social commitment and his contributions to the art of weaving.

== Biography ==
Gopinathan was born in a small village called Manjavilakom, in Neyyattinkara, in Thiruvananthapuram, in the southern tip of Kerala in a poor weaver's family as one of the ten children. The financial struggles of his family is reported to have forced him to abandon education at the age of 10 and move to Nagarcoil, a town in Tamil Nadu, known for handloom weaving, where he learnt weaving skills. Later, he moved to Madurai and Salem, larger cities in Tamil Nadu, for training on how to set up looms and returned to Kerala at the age of 30, with enough money to buy a piece of land. Back at his native village, he set up his own loom in a small shed.

In 1972, Gopinathan organized 30 local women, under a Mahila Samajam (women's self-help groups), and trained them in weaving. He donated his land to the association for them to house their looms and, by 1978, the number of associations under his leadership grew to 26 with 300 looms working in an 80-cents plot. Later, he bought a 10-acre plot for the initiative and gathered the efforts of the association under one umbrella, Eco Tex Handloom Consortium. In 2006, with a ₹ 30 million loan-cum-grant from the Government of Kerala, he modernized the machinery, but it is reported that the consortium is still facing financial problems.

The Government of India awarded him the civilian honor of the Padma Shri in 2007. Three years later, he was chosen as a Real Hero, by the Reliance Foundation and CNN-IBN, in the women's welfare section. Gopinathan is married and has three sons and a daughter. The family continues to live in Manjavilakom where he has also established Gandhi Smaraka Technical School, a vocational training school for girls from scheduled castes and scheduled tribes, and provides them with training in tailoring, embroidery and needlework.

== See also ==
- Handloom
