= Gopinathpur, Tarasingi =

Village in Odisha, India

Coordinates: 19.410°N 84.743°E

Gopinathpur is a small village in Tarasingi, Ganjam district, Odisha, India. As of the 2011 Census of India, it had a population of 374 across 83 households.
