= Chavakkad =

Chavakkad Chowghat
- Municipality
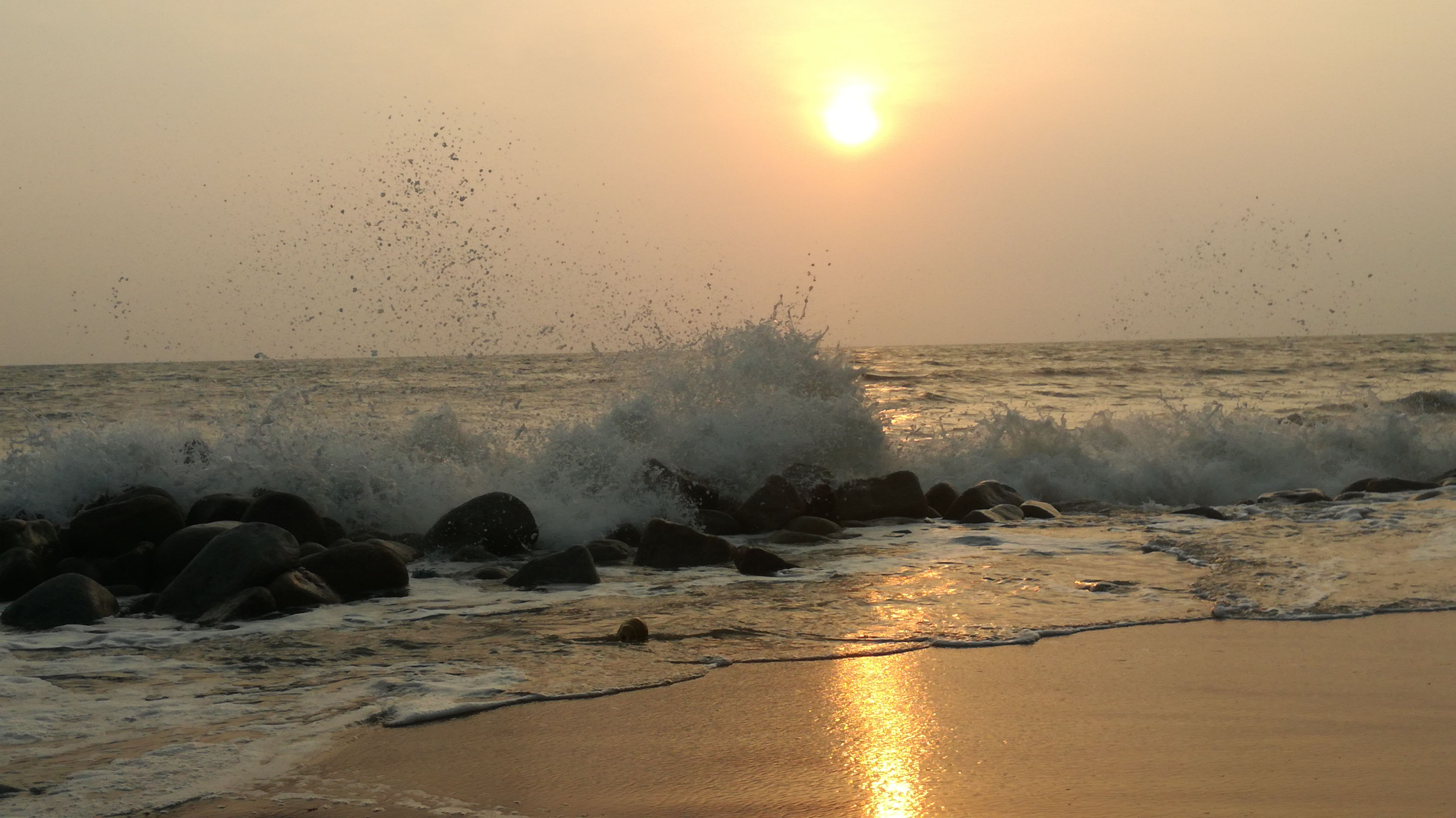
- Chavakkad beach
- Interactive map of Chavakkad
- Coordinates: 10.53°N 76.05°E
- Country: India
- State: Kerala
- District: Thrissur

Area
  - Total: 12.41 km^{2} (4.79 sq mi)
- Elevation: 14 m (46 ft)

Population (2011)
  - Total: 39,098
  - Density: 3,151/km^{2} (8,160/sq mi)

Languages
  - Official: Malayalam, English
- Time zone: UTC+5:30 (IST)
- PIN: 680506
- Telephone code: +91487
- Vehicle registration: KL 46

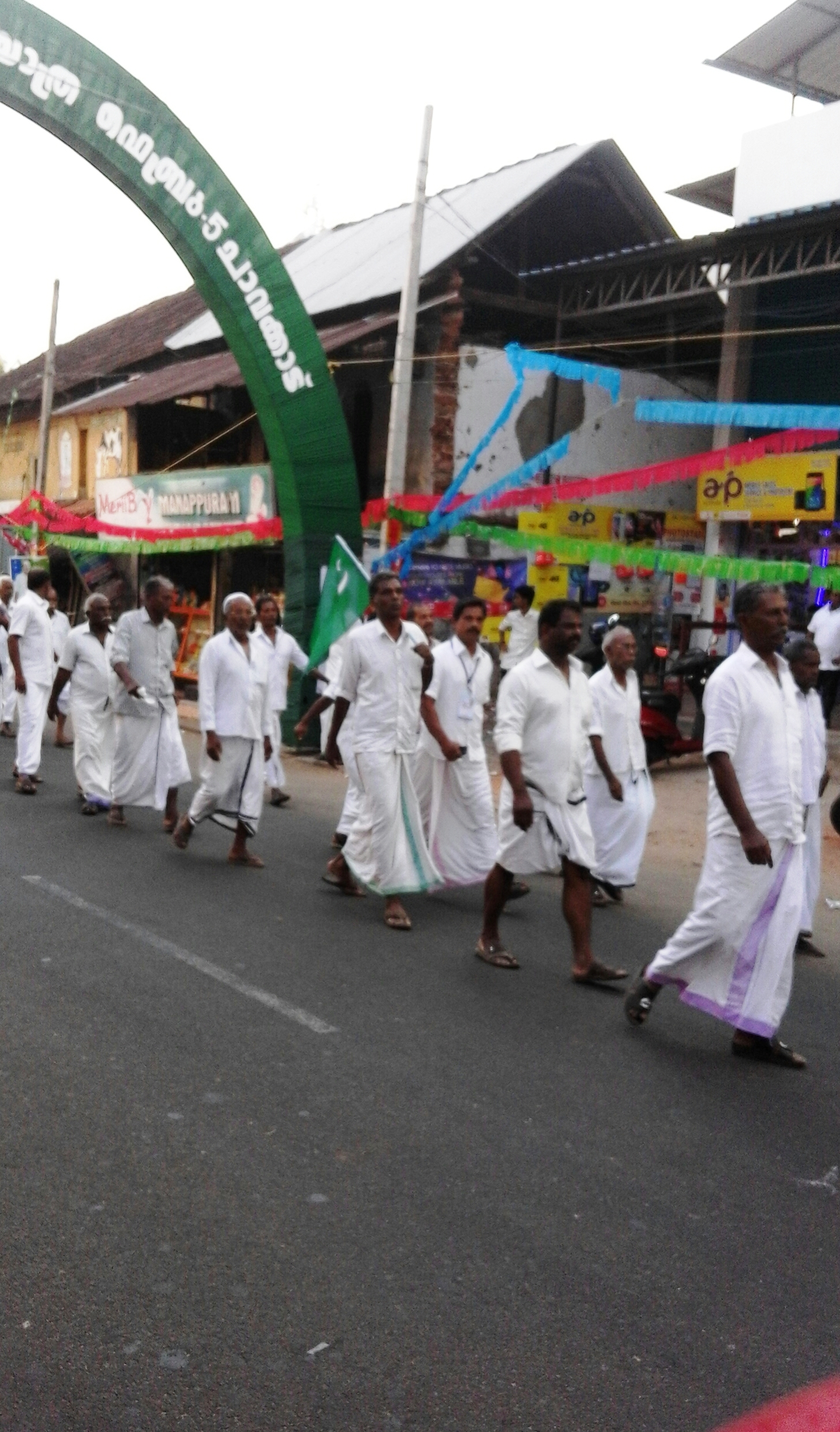
A political rally in Chavakkad

Chavakkad, formerly Chowghat, is a municipality in Thrissur district of the Indian state of Kerala. Chavakkad is known for its beach and fishing. It lies on National Highway 66, located approximately 26 km (16 mi) northwest of district headquarters Thrissur, 80 km (50 mi) north of the major city Kochi and 25 km (16 mi) south of the coastal town Ponnani.

== Demographics ==
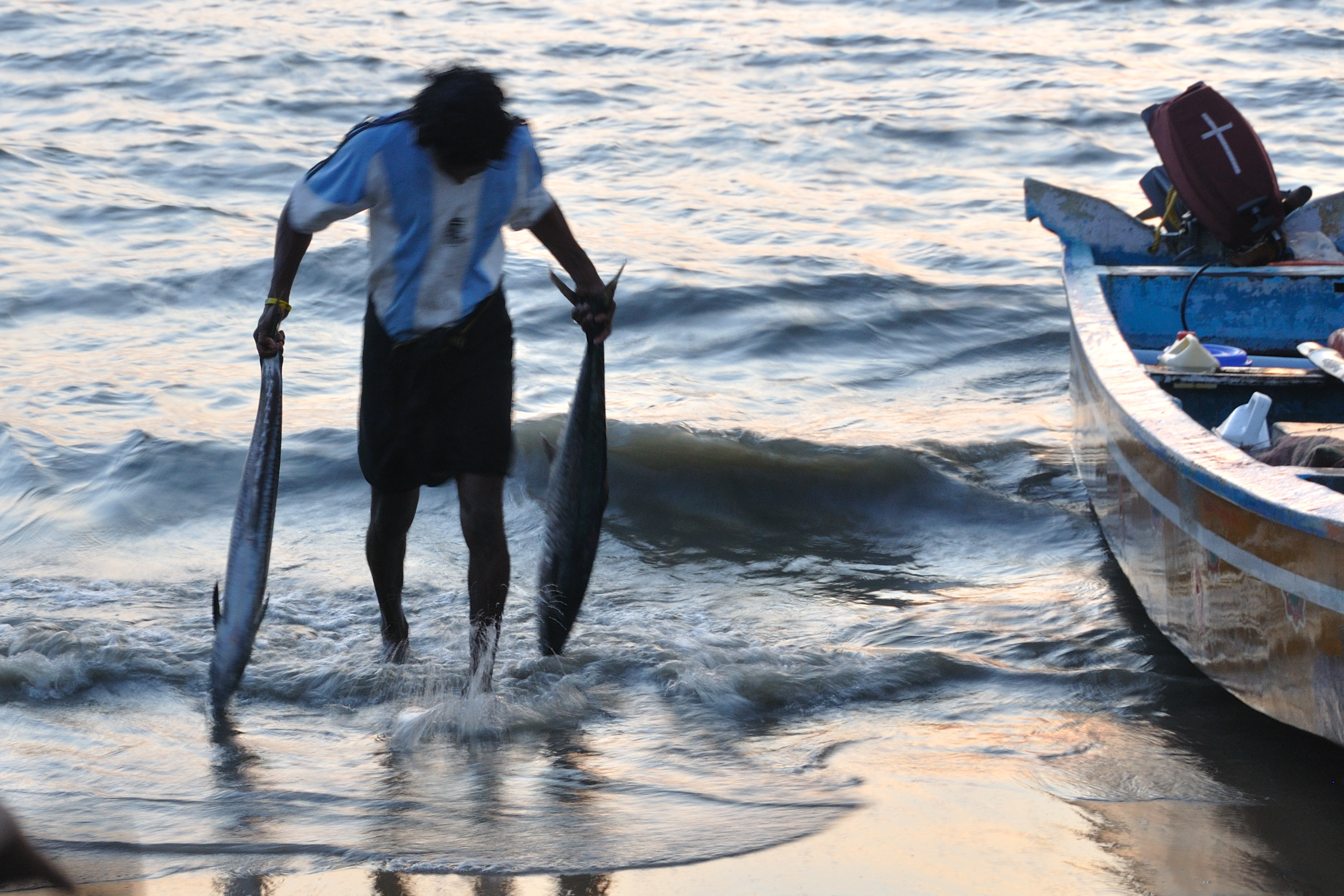
Catching fish

According to the 2011 census of India, Chavakkad had a population of 39,098. Males constitute 45.42% of the population and females 54.58%. Chavakkad has an average literacy rate of 94.36%, higher than the national average of 74.04%; with male literacy of 95.95% and female literacy of 93.08%. 12.03% of the population is under 6 years of age.

The major religious identities include Islam (53.58%), Hinduism (41.87%) and Christianity (4.25%), while 0.3% are either practicing other religions or have no religious identity.

== Government ==
The Chavakkad Panchayath was established in 1918. Later on 1 October 1978, the Panchayat was upgraded to the status of a Municipality with an area of 12.41 km^{2} and is divided into 27 electoral wards. In 2010, the electoral wards were increased to 29. The municipality has a total population of 37,789 and a density of 3,045 per km^{2}. Chavakkad is a Grade-III Municipality and the headquarters of the Chavakkad Taluk. Chavakkad houses the Judicial First Class Magistrate Court and Munsif Courts. It also has a Sub Jail. Major political parties here include the Indian Union Muslim League, Indian National Congress, and the Communist Party of India (Marxist).

== Business ==
Chavakkad is an important trading center for copra, coir, and fish. The major source of revenue in Chavakkad is repatriated income mainly from the Non-Resident Indians working in the Middle East, typically from the GCC countries. The place is called as "Mini Gulf". The Rajah Group, owners of famous Kajah Beedi, Rajah Tiles, and Rajah Motors, has its headquarters in Chavakkad. The company, Kaja Beedi, was started in the year 1948 by Hajee Abdul Khader. Rajah Motors, which produced the first multi-purpose vehicle (MPV) in India, known by the name 'Tiger' and 'Kangaroo', has its factory and offices in Chavakkad.

== Tourism ==
- Chavakkad Beach: Located on the coast of Arabian Sea in West Coast, Chavakkad Beach is counted amongst Kerala's most popular beaches. It is two kilo metres from the Chavakkad town. Chavakkad Beach is famous for the spectacle called 'Azhimokam' in Malayalam which means a place where a river confluences with the sea.
- St. Thomas Church (Palayur): Located at Palayur, according to Saint Thomas Christian tradition, the Syrian church was established in 52 AD by St Thomas, one of the twelve apostles of Jesus Christ. Palayoor Syro-Malabar church is the oldest Christian Church in India and is called an Apostolic Church credited to the Apostolate of St. Thomas who preached and also started conversion of people to Christianity here. The main feast is observed in the month of July. The 3rd of July is the day of "Dukhrana" which is observed as a remembrance day of St Thomas the apostle. And the Sunday which comes after the tenth of the month is observed as the day of "Tharpana" to remember the first christening ceremony done by St Thomas the apostle at the Thaliyakulam near to the church.
- Guruvayur Temple

== See also ==
- Kadalaayimana
- Ponnani
