= Gopinathpur, Golanthara =

Village in Odisha, India

Gopinathpur is a small village in Golanthara, Ganjam district, Odisha, India. As of the 2011 Census of India, it had a population of 396 across 86 households.
