= G. Gopinathan Pillai =

Indian politician

G Gopinathan Pillai

Member of the Kerala Legislative Assembly
- In office 1967–1977
- Preceded by: N Gopala Kurup
- Succeeded by: N Bhaskaran Nair
- Constituency: Mavelikkara

Personal details
- Born: 21 October 1921 Mavelikkara, Kerala, India
- Died: 23 November 2002 (aged 81) Mavelikkara, Kerala, India
- Party: SSP, PSP
- Spouse: Saradamma
- Children: Jayaprakash G and Sreeprakash G
- Parent: Gopalakurup [Father] Janakiamma [Mother]
- Education: (B.A.B.L) Bachelor of Arts Bachelor of Law
- Occupation: Politician

G Gopinathan Pillai (1921–2002) was an Indian politician/Ex-MLA from Praja Socialist Party who represented Mavelikkara constituency from 1967 to 1977.

== Early Life & Education ==
G. Gopinatha Pillai was born on 21 October 1921, in Mavelikara, Alappuzha. His father was Advocate Gopala Kurup, and his mother was Chettikulangara Puthanpurakkal Janaki Amma. He had five siblings: G. Gangadharan Pillai, G. Gopalakrishnan Pillai, Anandavalli Amma, Rajalakshmi Amma, and Vijayalakshmi Amma.

G. Gopinatha Pillai completed his schooling at Government High School, Mavelikara. He pursued his Intermediate studies at Trivandrum Arts College, followed by a Bachelor of Arts (B.A.) degree from Maharaja's College, Trivandrum (now University College, Trivandrum). He then obtained his Bachelor of Laws (B.L.) from Government Law College, Thiruvananthapuram.

== Career ==
G. Gopinatha Pillai practiced law as an advocate in the Mavelikara and Kollam District Courts. He held various public and administrative positions throughout his career, including:

- Member of the Mavelikara Municipal Council
- Youngest President of the Nair Service Society (NSS) Taluk Union
- Member of the Guruvayoor Devaswom Governance Council
- Vice Chairman of the Kerala State Financial Enterprise
- Director of the Alappuzha District Sahakarana Bank
- Senate Member of the Kerala Sarvakalashala (University of Kerala)
- Member of the Dakshina Bharat Hindi Prachar Sabha
- President of the Mavelikara Bar Association
