= Gopinathpur, Bangladesh =

Gopinathpur is a village in Kasba Upazila, Brahmanbaria District, Bangladesh. The villages that surround Gopinathpur are in West Nemtabad, in East Jogunatthpur, South Horiabohu Chandider, North Miondhu, and Noyamora. There is a lake surrounding the village called the Sarisher Doli Bill.
