= Gopinathpur, Hinjili =

Village in Odisha, India

Coordinates: 19.410841°N 84.743926°E

Gopinathpur is a small village in Hinjili, Ganjam district, Odisha, India. As of the 2011 Census of India, it had a population of 2,036 across 443 households.
