= Gopinath Temple, Gopeshwar =

Hindu Temple in Uttarakhand

Gopinath Temple
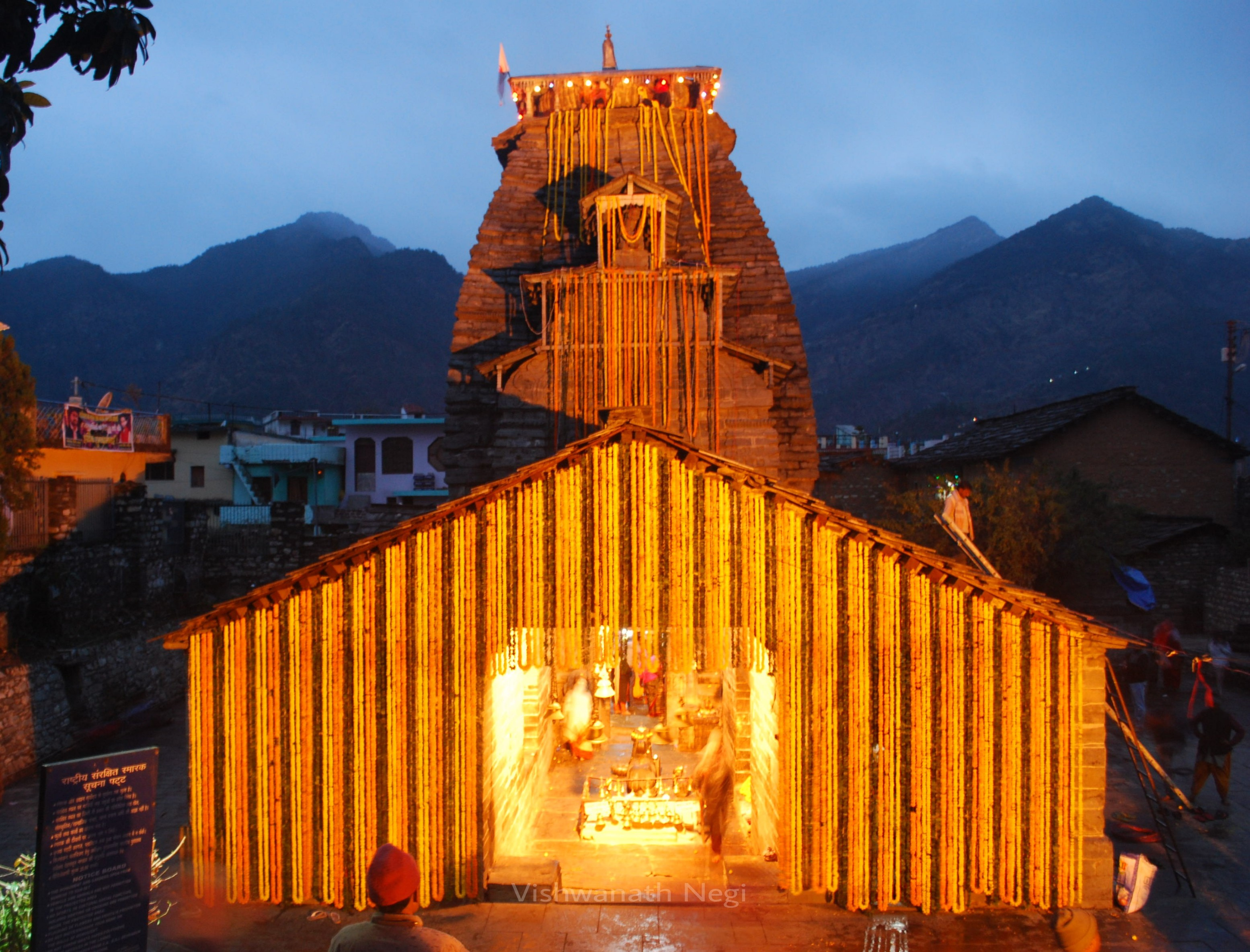

- Location in Uttarakhand

Religion
- Affiliation: Hinduism
- District: Chamoli

Location
- Location: Chamoli Gopeshwar
- State: Uttarakhand
- Country: India
- Interactive map of Gopinath Temple
- Coordinates: 30.4138°N 79.3160°E

Gopinath Temple is an ancient Hindu temple dedicated to Shiva in Gopeshwar, Chamoli District, Uttarakhand, India. It is situated in Gopeshwar village now part of Gopeshwar town. The temple stands out in its architectural proficiency; it is topped by a magnificent dome and the 30 sq ft (2.8 m^{2}) sanctum sanctorum, which is accessible by 24 doors.

The remains of broken idols found around the temple testify the existence of several more temples in ancient times. A 5 m high trident made of eight different metals is in the courtyard of the temple, dating back to the 12th century. It has inscriptions attributed to Ashokchalla, the king of Nepal who reigned in the 13th century. Four short inscriptions written in Devanagri, which dates back to a later period, are yet to be deciphered, barring one. Legend is that the trident got fixed in this spot, when Lord Shiva threw it at Lord Kama to kill him. The legend goes that the trident belonged to Shiva who threw it at Kamdeva (The God Of Love) to kill him and it got fixed in this spot. It is believed that while brute force can not move this Trident, the slightest touch by a true devotee can cause a tremor in it. The metal of the trident does not appear to have become weathered by the elements over the century.
