= Kadappuram =

- village
- Location in Kerala, India Kadappuram (India)
- Coordinates: 10°33′0″N 76°7′0″E
- Country: India
- State: Kerala
- District: Thrissur
- Established: 1968

Government
  - Type: Local Self Government Department
  - Body: Kadappuram Grama Panchayat

Population (2011)
  - Total: 22,938
  - Density: 2,388/km^{2} (6,180/sq mi)

Languages
  - Official: Malayalam, English
- Time zone: UTC+5:30 (IST)
- PIN: 680514
- Vehicle registration: KL-46

Kadappuram is a village in Thrissur district in the state of Kerala, India. Although in the Malayalam language, 'Kadappuram' may refer to any sea side beach usually with a fishing community, this article specifically refers to the area in Thrissur District where the village as well as the panchayat by the name of 'Kadappuram'. The name "Kadappuram" is originated from the Malayalam word "Kadalppuram". The panchayat was part of Ponnani Taluk, Malabar district in Madras state at the time of British rule. The Kadappuram Panchayat was founded in the year 1968. And the panchayat consists of 16 wards.

== Demographics ==
As of 2011 India census, Kadappuram had a population of 22938 with 10522 males and 12416 females.
