= Chavakkad Beach =

Beach in Kerala, India

- Beach
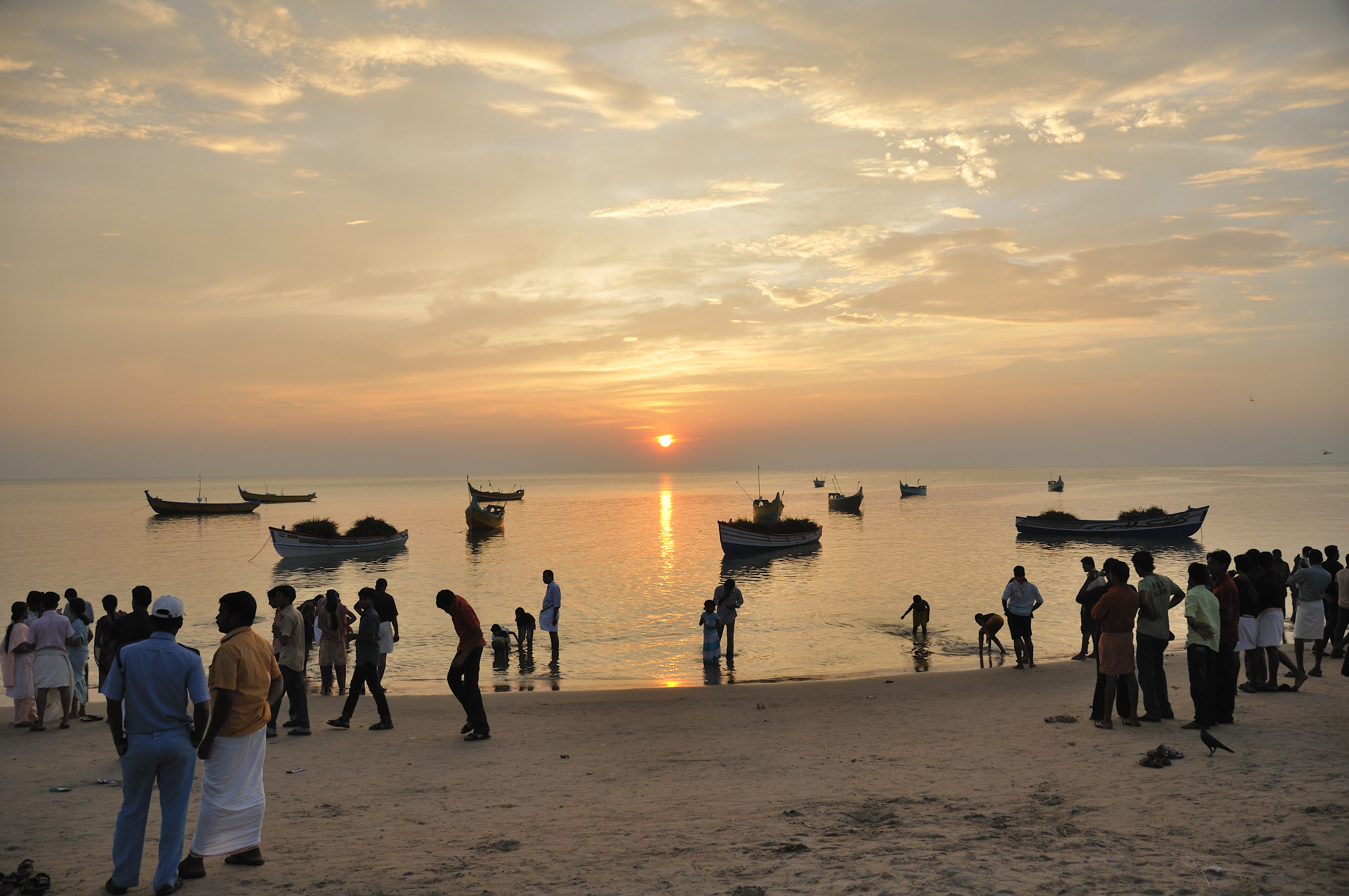
- Chavakkad Beach, Thrissur district, Keralam

- Chavakkad Beach, Thrissur district, Keralam
- Coordinates: 10.572°N 76.008°E
- Location: Chavakkad, Thrissur district, Keralam
- Elevation: 20.07 m (65.8 ft)

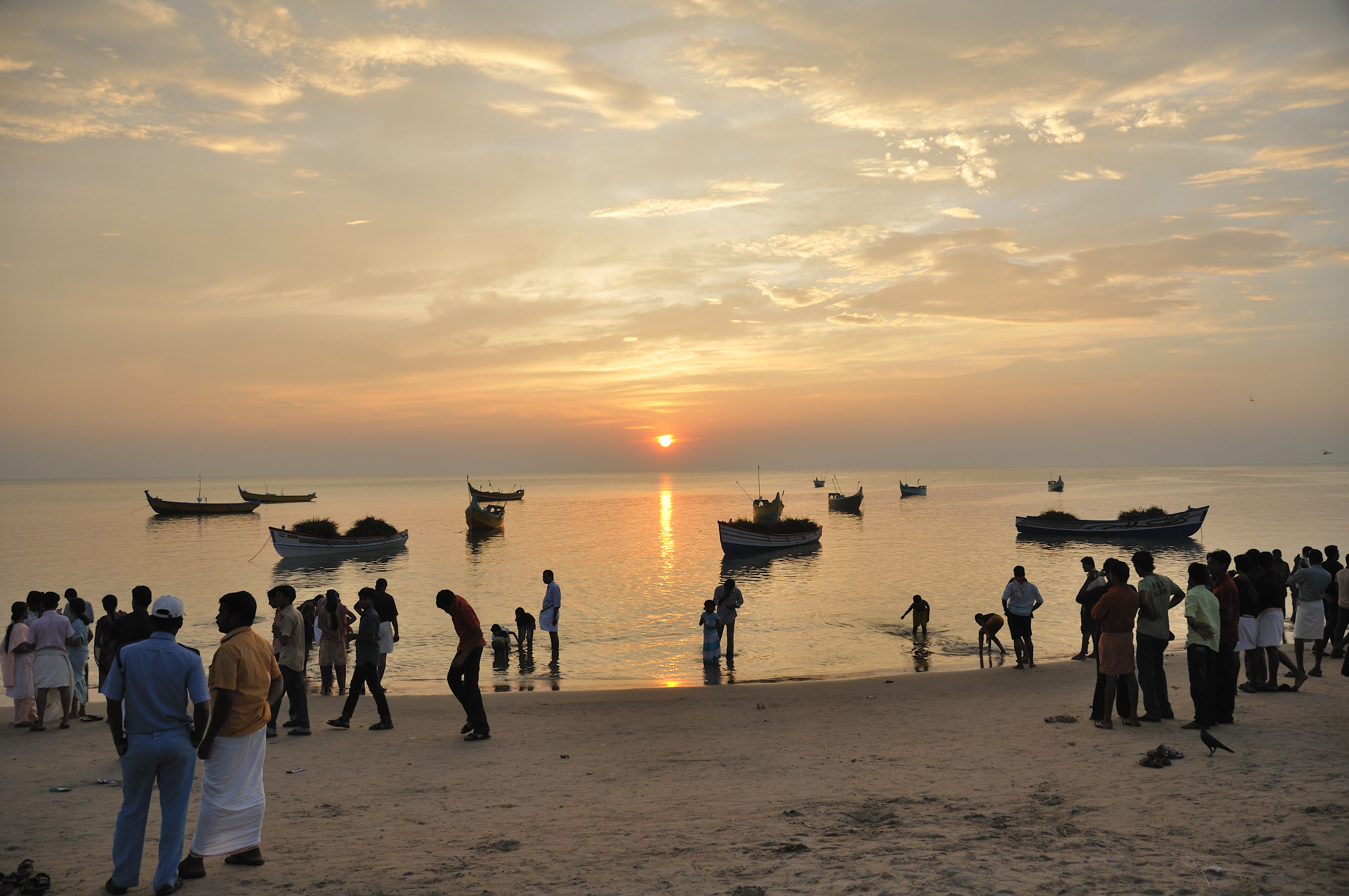
Fishing boats in Chavakkad Beach after a catch.

Chavakkad Beach is a beach in Chavakkad Municipality of Thrissur District in the Indian state of Kerala.

== Location ==
It lies on the Arabian Sea coast and attracts tourists. The beach is situated 5 Kilometers from Guruvayoor Temple Sri Krishna Temple.

== Description ==
At this beach the river meets the sea forming an estuary. The meeting point is known as Azhimukham in Malayalam. It is counted amongst Kerala's most popular beaches because it is unexplored by domestic tourists.
