= M. Rahmathulla =

Indian politician

M. Rahmathulla is a politician from Kerala, India. He is a member of the Kerala Legislative Assembly. He represents the Manjeri assembly constituency in 16th Kerala State Legislative Assembly. He belongs to the Indian Union Muslim League.
