= K. M. Abraham (politician) =

Indian politician

- Born: 27 March 1919; Pampady, Kottayam
- Died: 5 September 2006 (aged 87)
- Citizenship: India
- Education: English High School, Puthupally.
- Occupations: Trade Union worker, Politician.
- Years active: 1942–2006
- Political party: Communist Party of India (Marxist).
- Spouse: Annamma Abraham.
- Children: 6
- Parent: K. E. Mani (father)

Kollettu Mani Abraham (27 March 1919 – 5 September 2006) was a member of the 4th Lok Sabha of India. He represented the Kottayam constituency of Kerala and was a member of the Communist Party of India (Marxist) political party. He was in office from March 1967 to December 1970.

== Background ==
He was born to Aliyamma and K. E. Mani, son of Eapen of the Kollettu Family.

Abraham was educated in English High School, Puthupally and was a full-time political and trade union worker. He was associated with Indian National Congress prior to joining the Communist Party in 1942. He was imprisoned for more than four years on account of political activities.

== See also ==
- List of members of the 15th Lok Sabha of India
