= Guruvayur Assembly constituency =

Constituency of the Kerala legislative assembly in India

Guruvayur
- Constituency No. 63 for the Kerala Legislative Assembly
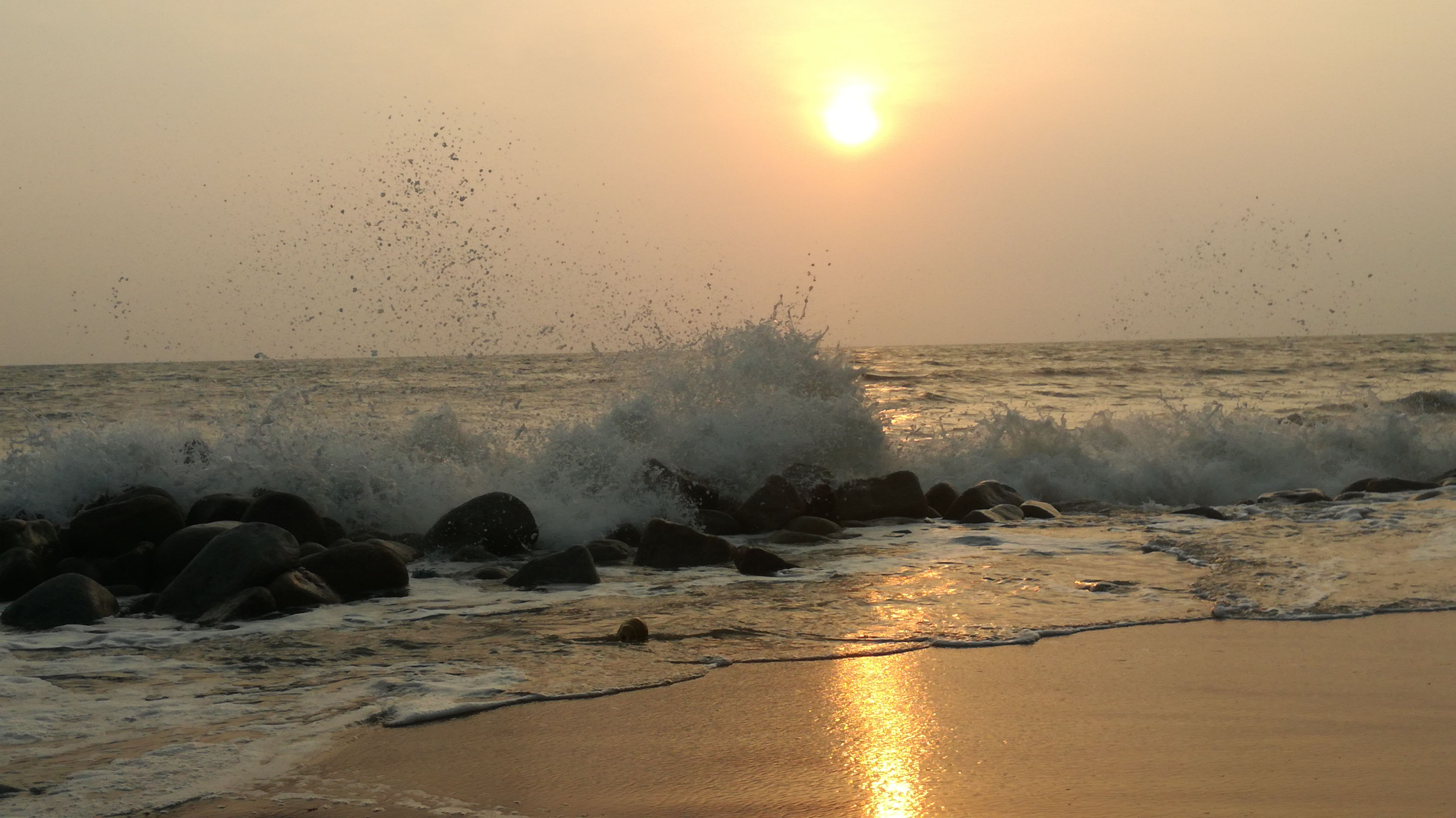
- Chavakkad Beach

Constituency details
- Country: India
- Region: South India
- State: Kerala
- District: Thrissur
- Established: 1957
- Total electors: 2,01,801 (2016)
- Reservation: None

Member of Legislative Assembly
- 16th Kerala Legislative Assembly
- Incumbent N. K. Akbar
- Party: CPI(M)
- Alliance: LDF
- Elected year: 2026

Guruvayur State assembly constituency is one of the 140 state legislative assembly constituencies in Kerala. It is also one of the seven state legislative assembly constituencies included in Thrissur Lok Sabha constituency. As of the 2026 assembly elections, the current MLA is N. K. Akbar of CPI(M).

== Location ==
Location of Chavakkad Taluk in Thrissur District

Guruvayur Assembly constituency lies in Chavakkad taluk. Chavakkad is the lone taluk of Thrissur district, which entirely lies in the erstwhile British Malabar. Chavakkad Taluk was created in 1956-57 by dividing Ponnani taluk of the erstwhile Malabar District. Present-day Chavakkad taluk and much of the coastal region of Thrissur district were ruled by the Zamorin of Calicut until the 18th century. Guruvayur Assembly constituency shares its boundary with Ponnani Assembly constituency of Malappuram district to the north, Kunnamkulam Assembly constituency to the northeast, and Manalur Assembly constituency both to southeast and south.

== Local self-governed segments ==
Guruvayur Assembly constituency is composed of the following local self-governed segments:

Sl no.	Name	Status (Grama panchayat/Municipality)	Taluk
1	Chavakkad	Municipality	Chavakkad
2	Guruvayur	Municipality	Chavakkad
3	Engandiyur	Grama panchayat	Chavakkad
4	Kadappuram	Grama panchayat	Chavakkad
5	Orumanayur	Grama panchayat	Chavakkad
6	Punnayur	Grama panchayat	Chavakkad
7	Punnayurkulam	Grama panchayat	Chavakkad
8	Vadakkekad	Grama panchayat	Chavakkad

== Members of Legislative Assembly ==
The following list contains all members of Kerala Legislative Assembly who have represented the constituency:

Election	Niyama Sabha	Member	Party	Tenure
1957	1st	Koru Kooliyat	Independent	1957 – 1960
1960	2nd	K. G. Karunakara Menon	Indian National Congress	1960 – 1965
1967	3rd	B. V. S. Thangal	Indian Union Muslim League	1967 – 1970
1970	4th	V. Vadakan	Independent	1970 – 1977
1977	5th	B. V. S. Thangal	Indian Union Muslim League	1977 – 1980
1980	6th	B. V. S. Thangal	Indian Union Muslim League	1980 – 1982
1982	7th	P. K. K. Bava	Indian Union Muslim League	1982 – 1987
1987	8th	P. K. K. Bava	Indian Union Muslim League	1987 – 1991
1991	9th	P. M. Abubacker	Indian Union Muslim League	1991 – 1996
1996	10th	P. T. Kunju Muhammed	Independent	1996 – 2001
2001	11th	P. K. K. Bava	Indian Union Muslim League	2001 – 2006
2006	12th	K. V. Abdul Khader	Communist Party of India	2006 – 2011
2011	13th	K. V. Abdul Khader	Communist Party of India	2011 – 2016
2016	14th	K. V. Abdul Khader	Communist Party of India	2016-2021
2021	15th	N. K. Akbar	Communist Party of India	2021-2026
2026	16th	N. K. Akbar	Communist Party of India	2026-current

== Election results ==
=== 2026 ===
2026 Kerala Legislative Assembly election: Guruvayur
Party	Candidate	Votes	%	±%
CPI(M)	N. K. Akbar	66,069	40.77	▼11.75
IUML	C. H. Rasheed	64,071	39.54	▼0.61
BJP	Adv. B. Gopalakrishnan	28,947	17.86	▲13.57
SDPI	K. V. Abdul Nasar	1,610	0.99	
AAP	Pauly Francis Guruvayur	466	0.29	
SUCI(C)	C. R. Unnikrishnan	218	0.13	
NOTA	None of the above	658	0.41	
Margin of victory		1,998	1.23	▼11.22
Turnout		1,62,039	73.31	▲3.66
CPI(M) hold		Swing	▼11.75	

=== 2021 ===
2021 Kerala Legislative Assembly election: Guruvayur
Party	Candidate	Votes	%	±%
CPI(M)	N. K. Akbar	77,072	52.52	▲7.76
IUML	K. N. A. Khader	58,804	40.07	▲5.54
DSJP	Dileep Nair	6,294	4.29	
NOTA	None of the Above	1,007	0.69	−
Margin of victory		18,268	12.45	▲2.22
Turnout		1,46,759	69.65	
CPI(M) hold		Swing	▲7.76	

=== 2016 ===
There were 1,90,919 registered voters in the constituency for the 2016 election.

2016 Kerala Legislative Assembly election: Guruvayur
Party	Candidate	Votes	%	±%
CPI(M)	K. V. Abdul Khader	66,088	44.76	▼3.77
IUML	P. M. Sadiqali	50,990	34.53	▼6.22
BJP	Nivedida Subramanian	25,490	17.26	▲10.01
SDPI	P. R. Siyad	1,406	0.95	▼0.75
WPOI	K. G. Mohanan	1,382	0.94	−
PDP	Muhammed Rasheed Arakkal	500	0.45	−
NOTA	None of the Above	605	0.41	−
SUCI(C)	C. V. Premraj	314	0.21	▼0.02
Independent	Abdul Khader Kumbilavalappil	256	0.17	−
Independent	Sasi Anjoor	204	0.14	−
Margin of victory		15,098	10.23	▲2.45
Turnout		1,47,350	73.17	
CPI(M) hold		Swing	▼3.77	

=== 2011 ===
There were 1,74,161 registered voters in the constituency for the 2011 election.

2011 Kerala Legislative Assembly election: Guruvayur
Party	Candidate	Votes	%	±%
CPI(M)	K. V. Abdul Khader	62,246	48.53	
IUML	Ashraf Kokkur	52,278	40.75	
BJP	Dayanandan Mampully	9,306	7.25	
SDPI	Ashraf Vadakoot	2,187	1.70	−
Independent	Shameerbabu	1,017	0.94	−
Independent	K. V. Abdul Khader	415	0.32	
Independent	Vijayanath	353	0.28	
SUCI(C)	C. V. Premraj	242	0.19	
BSP	Muhammed Ashraf	232	0.18	
Margin of victory		9,968	7.78	
Turnout		1,28,276	72.01	
CPI(M) hold		Swing		

== See also ==
- Guruvayur
- Thrissur district
- List of constituencies of the Kerala Legislative Assembly
- 2016 Kerala Legislative Assembly election
