= Manjeri Assembly constituency =

Constituency of the Kerala legislative assembly in India

Manjeri
- Constituency No. 37 for the Kerala Legislative Assembly
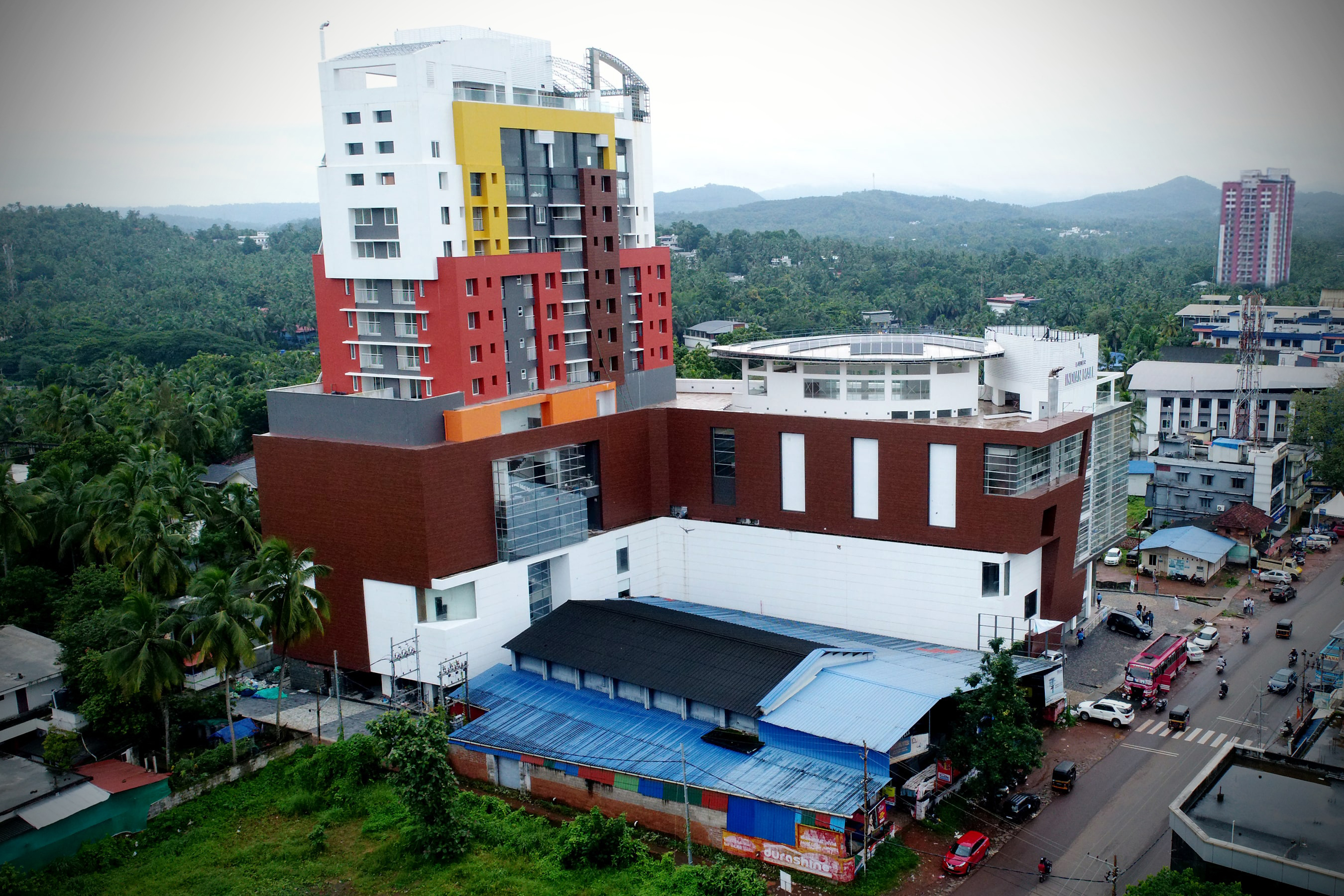
- Manjeri town

Constituency details
- Country: India
- Region: South India
- State: Kerala
- District: Malappuram
- Established: 1957
- Total electors: 2,06,960 (2021)
- Reservation: None

Member of Legislative Assembly
- 16th Kerala Legislative Assembly
- Incumbent M. Rahmathulla
- Party: IUML
- Alliance: UDF
- Elected year: 2026

Manjeri State assembly constituency is one of the 140 state legislative assembly constituencies in Kerala in southern India. It is also one of the seven state legislative assembly constituencies included in Malappuram Lok Sabha constituency. As of the 2026 Assembly elections, the current MLA is M. Rahmathulla of IUML.

== Local self-governed segments ==
Manjeri Assembly constituency is composed of the following local self-governed segments:

Sl no.	Name	Status (Grama panchayat/Municipality)	Taluk
1	Manjeri	Municipality	Eranad
2	Trikkalangode	Grama panchayat	Eranad
3	Pandikkad	Grama panchayat	Eranad
4	Keezhattur	Grama panchayat	Perinthalmanna
5	Edappatta	Grama panchayat	Perinthalmanna

Manjeri Assembly constituency

== Members of Legislative Assembly ==
The following list contains all members of Kerala Legislative Assembly who have represented Manjeri Assembly constituency during the period of various assemblies:

Election	Niyama Sabha	Name	Party	Tenure
1957	1st	P. P. Ummer Koya	Indian National Congress	1957 – 1960
1957	1st	Chandayan Muniadan	Indian Union Muslim League	1957 – 1960
1960	2nd	P. P. Ummer Koya	Indian National Congress	1960 – 1965
1960	2nd	Chandayan Muniadan	Indian Union Muslim League	
1967	3rd	M. Chadayan	Indian Union Muslim League	1967 – 1970
1970	4th	K. P. Raman	Indian Union Muslim League	1970 – 1977
1977	5th	M. P. M. Abdulla Kurikkal	Indian Union Muslim League	1977 - 1980
1980	6th	C. H. Mohammed Koya	Indian Union Muslim League	1980 – 1982
1982	7th	C. H. Mohammed Koya	Indian Union Muslim League	1982 – 1984
1984*	7th	M. P. M. Ishaq Kurikkal	Indian Union Muslim League	1984 - 1987
1987	8th	M. P. M. Ishaq Kurikkal	Indian Union Muslim League	1987 – 1991
1991	9th	M. P. M. Ishaq Kurikkal	Indian Union Muslim League	1991 – 1996
1996	10th	M. P. M. Ishaq Kurikkal	Indian Union Muslim League	1996 – 2001
2001	11th	M. P. M. Ishaq Kurikkal	Indian Union Muslim League	2001 – 2006
2006	12th	P. K. Abdu Rabb	Indian Union Muslim League	2006 – 2011
2011	13th	M. Ummer	Indian Union Muslim League	2011 – 2016
2016	14th	M. Ummer	Indian Union Muslim League	2016 - 2021
2021	15th	U. A. Latheef	Indian Union Muslim League	2021-2026
2026	16th	M. Rahmathulla	Indian Union Muslim League	2026-

*by-election

== Election results ==
Percentage change (±%) denotes the change in the number of votes from the immediate previous election.

=== 2026 ===
2026 Kerala Legislative Assembly election: Manjeri
Party	Candidate	Votes	%	±%
IUML	M. Rahmathulla	113,622	59.8	▲9.58
LDF	V. M. Musthafa	55,735	29.33	▼11.6
BJP	Padmasree M.	13,423	7.06	▼0.17
NOTA	None of the above	3,319	1.75	▲0.98
AAP	Adv. P. P. A. Sageer	2,222	1.17	New entry
Independent	Bipin Benson Joseph	1,698	0.89	−
Margin of victory		57,887		
Turnout		1,90,019		
IUML hold		Swing		

=== 2021 ===
There were 2,06,960 registered voters in the constituency for the 2021 Kerala Assembly election.

2021 Kerala Legislative Assembly election: Manjeri
Party	Candidate	Votes	%	±%
IUML	U. A. Latheef	78,836	50.22%	Steady
CPI	Nazar Debona	64,263	40.93%	▲4.83
BJP	P. R. Rashmilnath	11,350	7.23%	▼0.85
Independent	Palathingal Aboobacker	1,341	0.85%	N/A
NOTA	None of the above	1,202	0.77%	▲0.11
Margin of victory		14,573	9.29%	▼4.83
Turnout		1,56,992	75.86%	▲2.84
IUML hold		Swing	Steady	

=== 2016 ===
There were 1,90,277 registered voters in Manjeri Assembly constituency for the 2016 Kerala Assembly election.

2016 Kerala Legislative Assembly election: Manjeri
Party	Candidate	Votes	%	±%
IUML	M. Ummer	69,779	50.22%	▼7.77%
CPI	Adv. K. Mohandas	50,163	36.10%	▲3.05%
BJP	Adv. C. Dinesh	11,223	8.08%	▲2.66%
WPOI	K. A. Savad	2,503	1.80%	−
SDPI	Dr. C. H. Ashraf	2,357	1.70%	▼0.79%
PDP	Moyin Bappu	1,121	0.81%	−
NOTA	None of the above	913	0.66%	−
Independent	V. M. Musthafa	887	0.64%	−
Margin of victory		19,616	14.12%	▼10.82%
Turnout		1,38,946	73.02%	▲2.01%
IUML hold		Swing	▼7.77%	

=== 2011 ===
There were 1,64,144 registered voters in the constituency for the 2011 election.

2016 Kerala Legislative Assembly election: Manjeri
Party	Candidate	Votes	%	±%
IUML	M. Ummer	67,594	57.99%	
CPI	P. Gouri	38,515	33.05%	
BJP	P. G. Upendran	6,319	5.42%	
SDPI	Jaleel Neelambra	2,906	2.49%	
Independent	Feroz Babu Ishtadanam	653	0.56%	
BSP	Shamsudheen Aslami	566	0.49	
Margin of victory		29,079	24.94%	
Turnout		1,16,553	71.01%	
IUML hold		Swing		

== See also ==
- Manjeri
- Malappuram district
- List of constituencies of the Kerala Legislative Assembly
- 2016 Kerala Legislative Assembly election
