= Mavelikara Assembly constituency =

Constituency of the Kerala legislative assembly in India

Mavelikara
- Constituency No. 109 for the Kerala Legislative Assembly
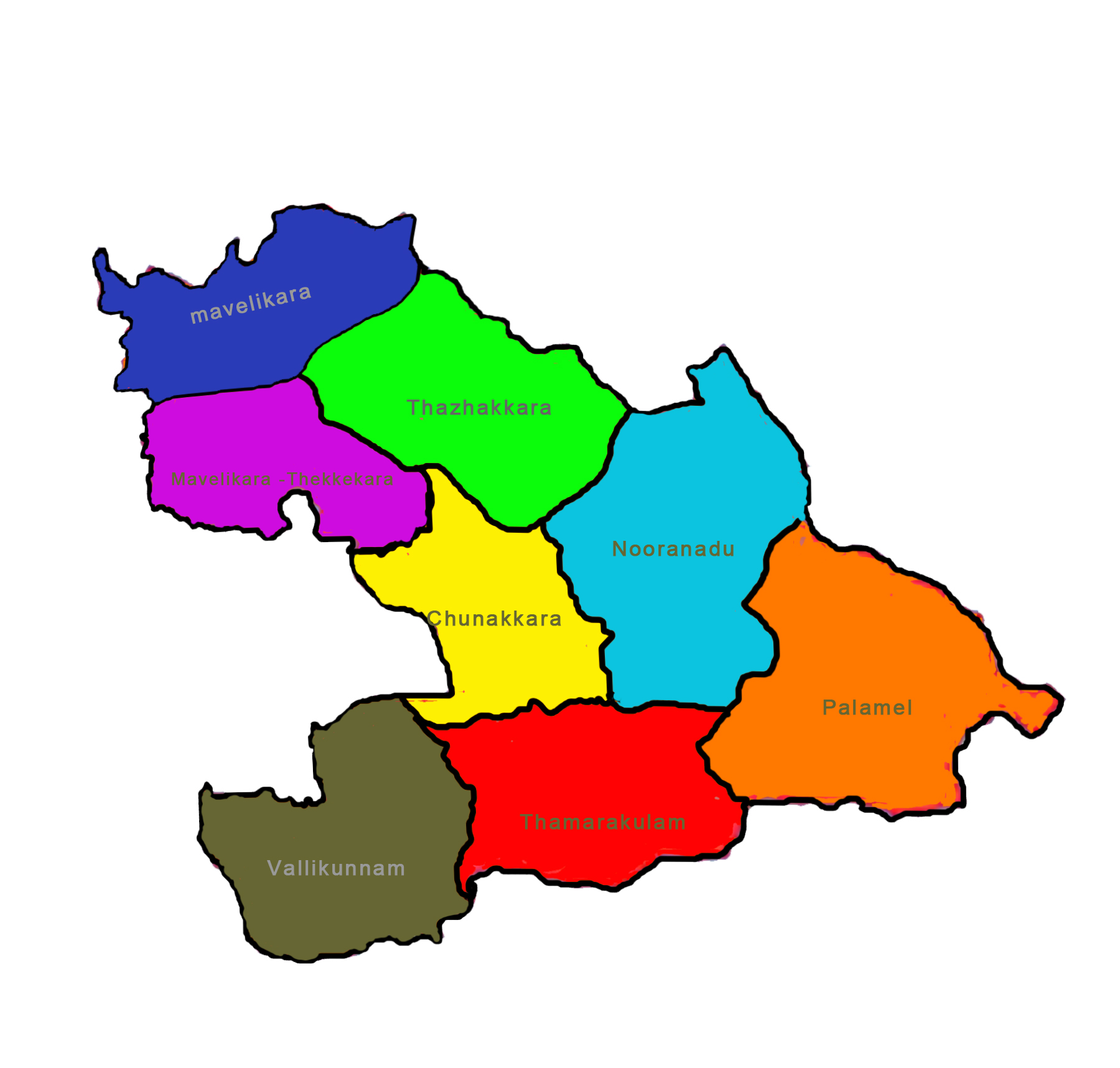

Constituency details
- Country: India
- Region: South India
- State: Kerala
- District: Alappuzha
- Lok Sabha constituency: Mavelikara
- Established: 1957
- Total electors: 1,98,395 (2016)
- Reservation: SC

Member of Legislative Assembly
- 16th Kerala Legislative Assembly
- Incumbent M. S. Arun Kumar
- Party: CPI(M)
- Alliance: LDF
- Elected year: 2026

Mavelikara Assembly constituency (No. 109) is a legislative entity in the Alappuzha district of Kerala. Rooted in the ancient history of the Onattukara principality, the constituency is a reserved seat for Scheduled Castes. It serves as a vital component of the Mavelikara Lok Sabha constituency and encompasses the historic Mavelikara Municipality along with seven surrounding rural panchayats.The current MLA is M. S. Arun Kumar from CPI(M).

== Local self-governed segments ==
Mavelikara Assembly constituency is composed of the following local self-governed segments:

Sl no.	Name	Status (grama panchayat/municipality)	Taluk
1	Mavelikkara	Municipality	Mavelikkara
2	Chunakkara	Grama panchayat	Mavelikkara
3	Mavelikkara-Thekkekara	Grama panchayat	Mavelikkara
4	Mavelikara-Thamarakkulam	Grama panchayat	Mavelikkara
5	Nooranad	Grama panchayat	Mavelikkara
6	Palamel	Grama panchayat	Mavelikkara
7	Thazhakkara	Grama panchayat	Mavelikkara
8	Vallikunnam	Grama panchayat	Mavelikkara

== Members of the Legislative Assembly ==
Election	Niyama Sabha	Member	Party	Tenure
1957	1st	P. K. Kunjachan	Communist Party of India	1957 – 1960
1957	1st	K. C. George	Communist Party of India	1957 – 1960
1960	2nd	Eravankara Gopala Kurup	Communist Party of India	1960 – 1965
1960	2nd	P. K. Kunjachan	Communist Party of India	1960 – 1965
1967	3rd	G. Gopinathan Pillai	Samyukta Socialist Party	1967 – 1970
1970	4th	G. Gopinathan Pillai	Praja Socialist Party	1970 – 1977
1977	5th	N. Bhaskaran Nair	National Democratic Party	1977 – 1980
1980	6th	S. Govinda Kurup	Communist Party of India	1980 – 1982
1982	7th	S. Govinda Kurup	Communist Party of India	1982 – 1987
1987	8th	S. Govinda Kurup	Communist Party of India	1987 – 1991
1991	9th	M Murali	Indian National Congress	1991 – 1996
1996	10th	M Murali	Indian National Congress	1996 – 2001
2001	11th	M Murali	Indian National Congress	2001 – 2006
2006	12th	M Murali	Indian National Congress	2006 – 2011
2011	13th	R. Rajesh	Communist Party of India	2011 – 2016
2016	14th	R. Rajesh	Communist Party of India	2016 - 2021
2021	15th	M. S. Arun Kumar	Communist Party of India	2021 - 2026
2026	16th	M. S. Arun Kumar	Communist Party of India	Incumbent

== Election results ==
Percentage change (±%) denotes the change in the number of votes from the immediate previous election.

=== 2026 ===
2026 Kerala Legislative Assembly election: Mavelikara
Party	Candidate	Votes	%	±%
CPI(M)	M. S. Arun Kumar	67,180	47.09	▼0.52
INC	Adv. Muthara Raj	51,444	36.06	▲4.85
BJP	K. Ajimon	23,200	16.26	▼4.28
API	Suresh Nooranad	278	0.19	
NOTA	None of the above	565	0.4	
Margin of victory		15,736	11.03	▼5.01
Turnout		1,42,667	72.62	
CPI(M) hold		Swing	▼5.01	

By Local body Segments
No.	Status (Local body)	Votes			Lead
No.	Status (Local body)	M. S. Arun Kumar	Muthara Raj	K. Ajimon	Lead
1	Mavelikkara Municipality	5,603	5,519	2,990	84
2	Thazhakkara	6,613	5,233	2,530	1,380
3	Mavelikkara-Thekkekara	12,481	8,212	4,567	4,269
4	Chunakkara	6,825	5,080	2,024	1,745
5	Nooranad	7,718	5,117	2,567	2,601
6	Palamel	9,947	7,403	2,546	2,544
7	Vallikunnam	5,041	4,365	1,540	676
8	Mavelikkara-Thamarakkulam	11,631	9,424	3,955	2,207
	Postal Votes	1,321	1,091	481	230

=== 2021 ===
There were 2,06,012 registered voters in the constituency for the 2021 Kerala Assembly election.

2021 Kerala Legislative Assembly election: Mavelikara
Party	Candidate	Votes	%	±%
CPI(M)	M. S. Arun Kumar	71,743	47.61	▼2.20
INC	K. K. Shaju	47,026	31.21	▲2.47
BJP	K. Sanju	30,955	20.54	▼0.12
NOTA	None of the above	519	0.34	▲0.03
API	Suresh Nooranad	165	0.11	
SUCI(C)	K. Sasikumar	151	0.10	
Independent	B. Subhash	131	0.09	
Margin of victory		24,717	16.40	
Turnout		1,50,690	73.16	▼2.29
CPI(M) hold		Swing	▼2.20	

=== 2016 ===
There were 1,98,395 registered voters in the constituency for the 2016 Kerala Assembly election.

2016 Kerala Legislative Assembly election: Mavelikara
Party	Candidate	Votes	%	±%
CPI(M)	R. Rajesh	74,555	49.81	▲0.51
INC	Baiju Kalasala	43,013	28.74	−
BJP	P. M. Velayudhan	30,929	20.66	▲16.93
NOTA	None of the above	523	0.35	−
SUCI(C)	Asha T.	242	0.16	−
BSP	Kattanam Suresh	213	0.14	▼0.50
Independent	Ajeeshkumar	213	0.14	
Margin of victory		31,542	21.07	▲17.22
Turnout		1,49,688	75.45	▲0.26
CPI(M) hold		Swing	▼0.51	

=== 2011 ===
There were 1,77,789 registered voters in the constituency for the 2011 election.

2011 Kerala Legislative Assembly election: Mavelikara
Party	Candidate	Votes	%	±%
CPI(M)	R. Rajesh	65,903	49.30	
JSS	K. K. Shaju	60,754	45.45	
BJP	S. Girija	4,984	3.73	
Independent	R. Rajeesh	1,185	0.89	
BSP	Subhash Mankamkuzhy	860	0.64	−
Margin of victory		5,149	3.85	
Turnout		1,49,688	75.19	
CPI(M) gain from INC		Swing		

=== 2006 ===
There were 1,31,267 registered voters in the constituency for the 2011 election.

2006 Kerala Legislative Assembly election: Mavelikara
Party	Candidate	Votes	%	±%
INC	M. Murali	47,449	48.7	
CPI(M)	G. Rajamma	44,777	45.9	
BJP	Adv. T. O. Noushad	3,793	3.9	
Independent	Varghese George	561	0.6	
AIADMK	Thajudheen Alummoottil	468	0.5	
Independent	Prasanna Kumar	446	0.5	
Margin of victory		2,672	2.7	
Turnout		97,505	74.3	
INC hold		Swing		

=== 2001 ===
There were 1,47,414 registered voters in the constituency for the 2001 election.

2001 Kerala Legislative Assembly election: Mavelikara
Party	Candidate	Votes	%	±%
INC	M. Murali	56,402	53.5	
NCP	N. V. Pradeep Kumar	45,419	43.0	
BJP	Radhamma Thankachi	3,028	2.9	
Independent	R. Parthasarathi Varma	382	0.4	
Independent	R. Sreedharan Pillai	293	0.3	
Margin of victory		10,983	10.4	
Turnout		1,05,534	71.6	
INC hold		Swing		

== See also ==
- Mavelikara
- Alappuzha district
- List of constituencies of the Kerala Legislative Assembly
- 2016 Kerala Legislative Assembly election
