= Kottayam Assembly constituency =

Constituency of the Kerala legislative assembly in India

Kottayam
- Constituency No. 97 for the Kerala Legislative Assembly
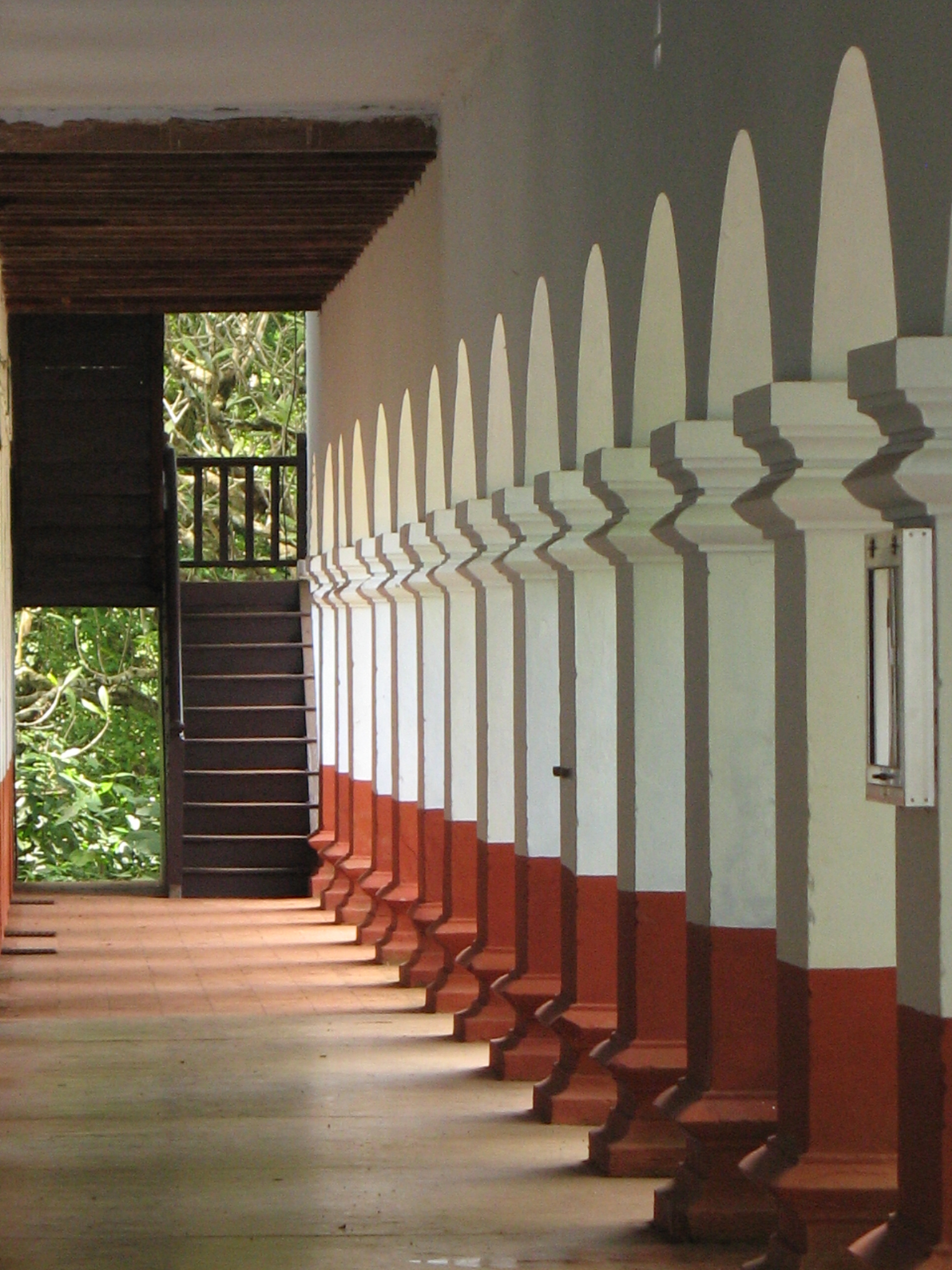
- CMS College Kottayam, the oldest existing college in India, established in 1815.

Constituency details
- Country: India
- Region: South India
- State: Kerala
- District: Kottayam
- Established: 1957
- Total electors: 128,625 (2016)
- Reservation: None

Member of Legislative Assembly
- 16th Kerala Legislative Assembly
- Incumbent Thiruvanchoor Radhakrishnan; Speaker of the Kerala Legislative Assembly
- Party: INC
- Alliance: UDF
- Elected year: 2026

Kottayam State assembly constituency is one of the 140 state legislative assembly constituencies in Kerala in southern India. It is also one of the seven state legislative assembly constituencies included in Kottayam Lok Sabha constituency. As of the 2026 Assembly elections, the current MLA is Thiruvanchoor Radhakrishnan of INC.

== Local self-governed segments ==
Kottayam Assembly constituency is composed of the following local self-governed segments:

Sl no.	Name	Status (Grama panchayat/Municipality)	Taluk
1	Kottayam	Municipality	Kottayam
2	Panachikkad	Grama panchayat	Kottayam
3	Vijayapuram	Grama panchayat	Kottayam

== Members of the Legislative Assembly ==
Election	Niyama Sabha	Member	Party	Tenure
1957	1st	P. Bhaskaran Nair	Communist Party of India	1957–1960
1960	2nd	M. P. Govindan Nair	Indian National Congress	1960–1965
1967	3rd	M. K. George	Communist Party of India	1967–1970
1970	4th	M. Thomas	Communist Party of India	1970–1977
1977	5th	P. P. George	Communist Party of India	1977–1980
1980	6th	K. M. Abraham	Communist Party of India	1980–1982
1982	7th	N. Srinivasan	Socialist Republican Party	1982–1987
1987	8th	T. K. Ramakrishnan	Communist Party of India	1987–1991
1991	9th	T. K. Ramakrishnan	Communist Party of India	1991–1996
1996	10th	T. K. Ramakrishnan	Communist Party of India	1996–2001
2001	11th	Mercy Ravi	Indian National Congress	2001–2006
2006	12th	V. N. Vasavan	Communist Party of India	2006–2011
2011	13th	Thiruvanchoor Radhakrishnan	Indian National Congress	2011–2016
2016	14th	Thiruvanchoor Radhakrishnan	Indian National Congress	2016–2021
2021	15th	Thiruvanchoor Radhakrishnan	Indian National Congress	2021 – 2026
2026	16th	Thiruvanchoor Radhakrishnan	Indian National Congress	2026 – present

== Election results ==
Percentage change (±%) denotes the change in the number of votes from the immediate previous election.

=== 2026 ===
2026 Kerala Legislative Assembly election: Kottayam
Party	Candidate	Votes	%	±%
INC	Thiruvanchoor Radhakrishnan	68,893	60.57	▲6.85
CPI(M)	Adv K. Anilkumar	32,907	28.93	▼9.4
BDJS	P. Anilkumar	9,726	8.55	▲1.48
AAP	Dr. Celine Philip	1,202	1.06	New
NOTA	None of the above	711	0.63	▲0.24
SUCI(C)	Ralesh Chandran	167	0.15	▲0.03
Independent	Shaiju Kurian	137	0.12	−
Margin of victory		35,986		
Turnout		113,747		
INC hold		Swing		

=== 2021 ===
2021 Kerala Legislative Assembly election: Kottayam
Party	Candidate	Votes	%	±%
INC	Thiruvanchoor Radhakrishnan	65,401	53.72	▼
CPI(M)	Adv K. Anilkumar	46658	38.33	▲
BJP	Minerva Mohan	8611	7.07	▼
NOTA	None of the above	473	0.39	
BSP	Sreekumar Chakkala	374	0.31	▼
SUCI(C)	M. K Shahazad	144	0.12	▼
ABHM	Arun Mangattu	77	0.06	−
Margin of victory		18743	15.27	▼
Turnout				
INC hold		Swing		

=== 2016 ===
There were 164,097 registered voters in the constituency for the 2016 Kerala Assembly election.

2016 Kerala Legislative Assembly election: Kottayam
Party	Candidate	Votes	%	±%
INC	Thiruvanchoor Radhakrishnan	73,894	57.46	▲10.62
CPI(M)	Reji Sakaria	40,262	31.31	▼14.92
BJP	M. S. Karunakaran	12,582	9.78	▲5.04
BSP	P. K. Geetha Krishnan	651	0.51	▼1.00
NOTA	None of the above	483	0.38	−
SP	Roy Chemmanam	403	0.31	−
SUCI(C)	Rejitha Jayaram	182	0.14	▼0.10
Independent	John Joy	88	0.07	−
Independent	Payas C. P.	58	0.05	−
Margin of victory		33,632	26.15	▲25.54
Turnout		1,28,603	78.37	▲0.85
INC hold		Swing	▲10.62	

=== 2011 ===
There were 148,225 registered voters in the constituency for the 2011 election.

2011 Kerala Legislative Assembly election: Kottayam
Party	Candidate	Votes	%	±%
INC	Thiruvanchoor Radhakrishnan	53,825	46.84	
CPI(M)	V. N. Vasavan	53,114	46.23	−
BJP	Narayanan Namboothiri	5,449	4.74	−
BSP	V. S. Shajan	1,737	1.51	−
Independent	Rajeev Abraham	387	0.34	−
SUCI(C)	N. K. Biju	276	0.24	−
Independent	George P. Elias	113	0.10	
Margin of victory		711	0.61	
Turnout		1,14,901	77.52	
INC gain from CPI(M)		Swing		

== See also ==
- Kottayam
- Kottayam district
- List of constituencies of the Kerala Legislative Assembly
- 2016 Kerala Legislative Assembly election
- 2021 Kerala Legislative Assembly election
