= Mararikulam Assembly constituency =

Constituency of the Kerala Legislative Assembly

Coordinates: 9.60°N 76.31°E

Mararikulam
- Former constituency for the Kerala Legislative Assembly

Constituency details
- Country: India
- Region: South India
- State: Kerala
- District: Alappuzha
- Established: 1957
- Abolished: 2008
- Total electors: 141,433 (2006)
- Reservation: None

Mararikulam Assembly constituency was one of the 140 state legislative assembly constituencies in Kerala in southern India, that existed before the 2008 delimitation of constituencies. It was also one among the seven state legislative assembly constituencies included in Alleppey Lok Sabha constituency.

Mararikulam Assembly constituency came into existence in 1957. It was represented by veteran Communist leader and former Chief Minister VS Achuthanandan from 1991 to 1996. In 1996, Achuthanandan suffered a shock defeat from a constituency that was otherwise considered to be a Communist bastion. This thwarted Achuthanandan from becoming the Chief Minister. He had to wait for another decade, until 2006, when he could fulfill his ambition, this time being elected from Malampuzha Assembly constituency.

The following list contains all the members who have represented the constituency in the Kerala legislative assembly.

== Members of the Legislative Assembly ==
Election	Niyama Sabha	Member	Party	Tenure	Majority
1957	1st	Sadasivan C. G.	Communist Party of India	1957 – 1960	9803
1960	2nd	S. Kumaran	Communist Party of India	1960 – 1965	7350
1965	3rd	Susheela Gopalan	Communist Party of India	N/A	5717
1967	3rd	S. Damodaran	Communist Party of India	1967 – 1970	12031
1970	4th	S. Damodaran	Communist Party of India	1970 – 1977	7407
1977	5th	A. V. Thamarakshan	Revolutionary Socialist Party	1977 – 1980	4346
1980	6th	A. V. Thamarakshan	Revolutionary Socialist Party	1980 – 1982	9829
1982	7th	A. V. Thamarakshan	Revolutionary Socialist Party	1982 – 1987	3399
1987	8th	T. J. Anjalose	Communist Party of India	1987 – 1991	12091
1991	9th	V. S. Achuthanandan	Communist Party of India	1991 – 1996	9980
1996	10th	P. J. Francis	Indian National Congress	1996 – 2001	1965
2001	11th	T. M. Thomas Isaac	Communist Party of India	2001 – 2006	8403
2006	12th	T. M. Thomas Isaac	Communist Party of India	2006 – 2011	17679
