= Malappuram Assembly constituency =

Constituency of the Kerala legislative assembly in India

Malappuram
- Constituency No. 40 for the Kerala Legislative Assembly
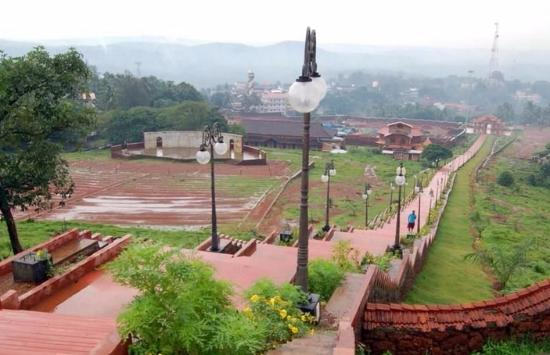
- Kottakkunnu is located at the centre of Malappuram city.

Constituency details
- Country: India
- Region: South India
- State: Kerala
- District: Malappuram
- Lok Sabha constituency: Malappuram
- Established: 1957
- Total electors: 2,11,990 (2021)
- Reservation: None

Member of Legislative Assembly
- 16th Kerala Legislative Assembly
- Incumbent P. K. Kunhalikutty
- Party: IUML
- Alliance: UDF
- Elected year: 2026

Malappuram State assembly constituency is one of the 140 state legislative assembly constituencies in Kerala in southern India. It is also one of the seven state legislative assembly constituencies included in Malappuram Lok Sabha constituency. As of the 2026 Assembly elections, the current MLA is P. K. Kunhalikutty of IUML.

== Local self-governed segments ==
Malappuram Assembly constituency is composed of the following local self-governed segments:

| Sl no. | Name | Status (Grama panchayat/Municipality) | Taluk |
|---|---|---|---|
| 1 | Malappuram | Municipality | Eranad |
| 2 | Pulpatta | Grama panchayat | Eranad |
| 3 | Pookkottur | Grama panchayat | Eranad |
| 4 | Anakkayam | Grama panchayat | Eranad |
| 5 | Morayur | Grama panchayat | Kondotty |
| 6 | Kodur | Grama panchayat | Perinthalmanna |

Malappuram Assembly constituency

== Members of Legislative Assembly ==
The following list contains all members of Kerala Legislative Assembly who have represented Malappuram Assembly constituency during the period of various assemblies:

| Election | Niyama Sabha | Name | Party | Tenure |
|---|---|---|---|---|
| 1957 | 1st | K. Hassan Gani | Indian Union Muslim League | 1957 – 1960 |
| 1960 | 2nd | K. Hassan Gani | Indian Union Muslim League | 1960 – 1965 |
| 1967 | 3rd | M. P. M. Ahamed Kurikkal | Indian Union Muslim League | 1967 – 1970 |
| 1970 | 4th | U. A. Beeran | Indian Union Muslim League | 1970 – 1977 |
| 1977 | 5th | C. H. Mohammed Koya | Indian Union Muslim League | 1977 – 1980 |
| 1980 | 6th | U. A. Beeran | Indian Union Muslim League | 1980 – 1982 |
| 1982 | 7th | P. K. Kunhalikutty | Indian Union Muslim League | 1982 – 1987 |
| 1987 | 8th | P. K. Kunhalikutty | Indian Union Muslim League | 1987 – 1991 |
| 1991 | 9th | Younus Kunhu | Indian Union Muslim League | 1991 – 1996 |
| 1996 | 10th | M. K. Muneer | Indian Union Muslim League | 1996 – 2001 |
| 2001 | 11th | M. K. Muneer | Indian Union Muslim League | 2001 – 2006 |
| 2006 | 12th | M. Ummer | Indian Union Muslim League | 2006 – 2011 |
| 2011 | 13th | P. Ubaidulla | Indian Union Muslim League | 2011 – 2016 |
| 2016 | 14th | P. Ubaidulla | Indian Union Muslim League | 2016 - 2021 |
| 2021 | 15th | P. Ubaidulla | Indian Union Muslim League | 2021 - 2026 |
| 2026 | 16th | P. K. Kunhalikutty | Indian Union Muslim League | Incumbent |

== Election results ==
Percentage change (±%) denotes the change in the number of votes from the immediate previous election.

=== 2026 ===
2026 Kerala Legislative Assembly election: Malappuram
| Party | Candidate | Votes | % | ±% |
|---|---|---|---|---|
| IUML | P. K. Kunhalikutty | 131,632 | 66.86 | ▲9.29 |
| NCP-SP | K.T. Mujeeb Rahman | 46,305 | 23.52 | ▼12.30 |
| BJP | Aswathi Gupthakumar | 9,127 | 4.64 | ▲0.96 |
| SDPI | Adv. Sadik Naduthodi | 5,124 | 2.60 | |
| AAP | Aboobacker Backer Kundupuzhakkal | 2,060 | 1.05 | New |
| NOTA | None of the above | 1,379 | 0.70 | |
| Independent | Abdul Gafoor Master O.P.K | 712 | 0.36 | |
| Independent | Abdulsalam K.P | 315 | 0.16 | |
| Independent | Sreedharan | 231 | 0.12 | |
| Margin of victory | | 85,327 | 43.34 | ▲21.59 |
| Turnout | | 1,96,885 | 80.35 | ▲4.01 |
| IUML hold | | Swing | ▲10.80 | |

=== 2021 ===
There were 2,11,990 registered voters in the constituency for the 2021 Kerala Assembly election.

2021 Kerala Legislative Assembly election: Malappuram
| Party | Candidate | Votes | % | ±% |
|---|---|---|---|---|
| IUML | P. Ubaidulla | 93,166 | 57.57% | ▲0.41 |
| CPI(M) | Paloli Abdurahman | 57,958 | 35.82% | ▲3.81 |
| BJP | Areekkad Sethumadhavan | 5,883 | 3.64% | ▼1.44 |
| WPOI | E. C. Ayisha | 3,194 | 1.97% | ▼0.38 |
| NOTA | None of the above | 994 | 0.61% | ▲0.03 |
| BSP | Prashobh. T | 321 | 0.20% | ▲0.20 |
| SUCI(C) | T. K. Bose | 309 | 0.19% | ▲0.19 |
| Margin of victory | | 35,208 | 21.75% | ▼3.40 |
| Turnout | | 1,61,825 | 76.34% | ▲3.14 |
| IUML hold | | Swing | ▲0.41 | |

=== 2016 ===
There were 1,93,761 registered voters in Malappuram Constituency for the 2016 Kerala Assembly election.

2016 Kerala Legislative Assembly election: Malappuram
| Party | Candidate | Votes | % | ±% |
|---|---|---|---|---|
| IUML | P. Ubaidulla | 81,072 | 57.16% | ▼6.59 |
| CPI(M) | Adv. K. P. Sumathi | 45,400 | 32.01% | − |
| BJP | K. N. Badusha Thangal | 7,211 | 5.08% | ▲1.94 |
| WPOI | E. C. Ayisha | 3,330 | 2.35% | − |
| SDPI | Jaleel Neelambra | 2,444 | 1.72% | ▼1.53 |
| PDP | Ashraf Pulpatta | 1,550 | 1.09% | − |
| NOTA | None of the above | 826 | 0.58% | − |
| Margin of victory | | 35,672 | 25.15% | ▼11.26 |
| Turnout | | 1,41,833 | 73.20% | ▲0.32 |
| IUML hold | | Swing | ▼6.59 | |

=== 2011 ===
There were 1,67,739 registered voters in the constituency for the 2011 election.

2011 Kerala Legislative Assembly election: Malappuram
| Party | Candidate | Votes | % | ±% |
|---|---|---|---|---|
| IUML | P. Ubaidulla | 77,928 | 63.75% | |
| JD(S) | Madathil Sadiqali | 33,420 | 27.34% | |
| SDPI | Sadiq Naduthodi | 3,968 | 3.25% | |
| BJP | K. Velayudhan | 3,841 | 3.14% | |
| Independent | Abu Thwair | 2,179 | 1.78% | |
| Independent | Pookkattil Ali Haji | 909 | 0.74% | |
| Margin of victory | | 44,508 | 36.41% | |
| Turnout | | 1,22,245 | 72.88% | |
| IUML hold | | Swing | | |

=== 2006 ===
2006 Kerala Legislative Assembly election: Malappuram
| Party | Candidate | Votes | % | ±% |
|---|---|---|---|---|
| IUML | Adv. M. Ummer | 70,056 | 58.41 | ▼8.57 |
| JD(S) | Adv. P. M. Safarulla | 39,399 | 32.85 | New entry |
| BJP | Adv. C. Dinesh | 4,938 | 4.12 | ▼0.88 |
| Independent | Abdul Majeed T. | 3,451 | 2.88 | New entry |
| BSP | Ashraf Thazhekkode | 2,094 | 1.75 | New entry |
| Margin of victory | | 30,657 | 25.56 | ▼13.40 |
| Turnout | | 1,19,938 | | |
| IUML hold | | Swing | ▼4.29 | |

=== 2001 ===
2001 Kerala Legislative Assembly election: Malappuram
| Party | Candidate | Votes | % | ±% |
|---|---|---|---|---|
| IUML | M. K. Muneer | 61,924 | 66.98 | ▲9.68 |
| NCP | K. S. Vijayam | 25,907 | 28.02 | New entry |
| BJP | Villodi Sundaran | 4,623 | 5.00 | ▲0.53 |
| Margin of victory | | 36,017 | 38.96 | ▲16.60 |
| Turnout | | 92,454 | 59.64 | ▼0.35 |
| IUML hold | | Swing | ▲4.84 | |

=== 1996 ===
1996 Kerala Legislative Assembly election: Malappuram
| Party | Candidate | Votes | % | ±% |
|---|---|---|---|---|
| IUML | M. K. Muneer | 52,593 | 57.30 | ▼6.08 |
| INL | P. M. A. Salam | 32,072 | 34.94 | New entry |
| BJP | Narukara Gopi | 4,105 | 4.47 | ▼0.94 |
| People's Democratic Party | Babu Mani, K. | 2,046 | 2.23 | New entry |
| IC(S) | Kadambottu Musthaffa | 508 | 0.55 | New entry |
| Independent | Mulanthipulakkal Muhammed Haji | 311 | 0.34 | New entry |
| Independent | P. Faisal Hassan Bava | 155 | 0.17 | New entry |
| Margin of victory | | 20,521 | 22.36 | ▼12.20 |
| Turnout | | 91,790 | 59.99 | ▲4.70 |
| IUML hold | | Swing | ▼3.04 | |

=== 1991 ===
1991 Kerala Legislative Assembly election: Malappuram
| Party | Candidate | Votes | % | ±% |
|---|---|---|---|---|
| IUML | Yoonus Kunju | 49,713 | 63.38 | |
| Indian Congress (Socialist) – Sharad Chandra Sinha | Sebastian J. Kaloor | 22,604 | 28.82 | |
| BJP | K. Narendran | 4,244 | 5.41 | |
| Independent | Peechi Abdul Azeez | 1,881 | 2.40 | |
| Margin of victory | | 27,109 | 34.56 | |
| Turnout | | 78,442 | 55.29 | |
| IUML hold | | Swing | | |

== See also ==
- Malappuram
- Malappuram district
- List of constituencies of the Kerala Legislative Assembly
- 2016 Kerala Legislative Assembly election
