= Ranni Assembly constituency =

Constituency of the Kerala legislative assembly in India

Ranni
- Constituency No. 112 for the Kerala Legislative Assembly
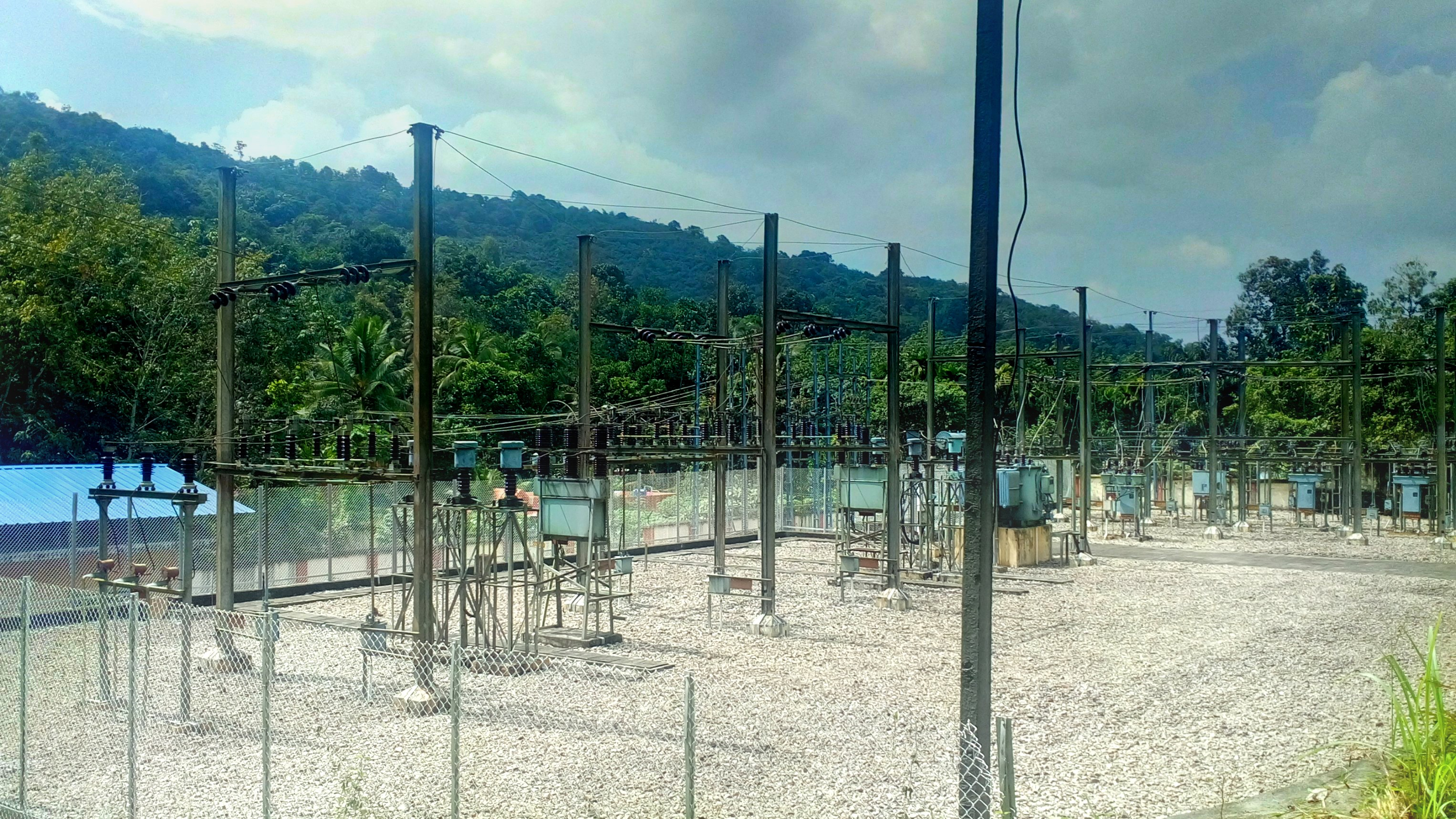
- A 33 Kilovolt Substation at Ranni-Perunad

Constituency details
- Country: India
- Region: South India
- State: Kerala
- District: Pathanamthitta
- Established: 1957
- Total electors: 1,93,634 (2021)
- Reservation: None

Member of Legislative Assembly
- 16th Kerala Legislative Assembly
- Incumbent Pazhakulam Madhu
- Party: Indian National Congress
- Elected year: 2026

Ranni is one of the 140 state legislative assembly constituencies in Kerala in southern India. It is also one of the seven state legislative assembly constituencies included in Pathanamthitta Lok Sabha constituency. As of the 2026 Assembly elections, the current member of the Legislative Assembly (MLA) is Pazhakulam Madhu of Indian National Congress.

== Local self-governed segments ==
Ranni Assembly constituency is composed of the following local self-governed segments:

| Sl no. | Name | Status (grama panchayat or municipality) | Taluk |
|---|---|---|---|
| 1 | Kottangal | Grama panchayat | Mallapally |
| 2 | Vechoochira | Grama panchayat | Ranni |
| 3 | Ranni-Perunad | Grama panchayat | Ranni |
| 4 | Naranammoozhy | Grama panchayat | Ranni |
| 5 | Ranni-Pazhavangadi | Grama panchayat | Ranni |
| 6 | Ranni-Angadi | Grama panchayat | Ranni |
| 7 | Kottanad | Grama panchayat | Mallapally |
| 8 | Ezhumattoor | Grama panchayat | Mallapally |
| 9 | Ayiroor | Grama panchayat | Ranni |
| 10 | Ranni | Grama panchayat | Ranni |
| 11 | Vadasserikkara | Grama panchayat | Ranni |
| 12 | Cherukole | Grama panchayat | Ranni |

== Members of the Legislative Assembly ==
The following list contains all members of Kerala Legislative Assembly who have represented Ranni Assembly constituency during the period of various assemblies:

| Year | Member | Political party |
|---|---|---|
| 1957 | Vayala Idicula | Indian National Congress |
| 1960 | Vayala Idicula | Indian National Congress |
| 1967 | M. K. Divakaran | Communist Party of India |
| 1970 | Jacob Skariah | Independent politician |
| 1977 | K. A. Mathew | Kerala Congress |
| 1980 | M. C. Cherian | Indian National Congress (U) |
| 1982 | Sunny Panavelil | Indian Congress (Socialist) |
| 1986* | Rachel Sunny Panavelil | Indian Congress (Socialist) |
| 1987 | Eapen Varughese | Kerala Congress |
| 1991 | M. C. Cherian | Indian National Congress |
| 1996 | Raju Abraham | Communist Party of India (Marxist) |
| 2001 | Raju Abraham | Communist Party of India (Marxist) |
| 2006 | Raju Abraham | Communist Party of India (Marxist) |
| 2011 | Raju Abraham | Communist Party of India (Marxist) |
| 2016 | Raju Abraham | Communist Party of India (Marxist) |
| 2021 | Pramod Narayan | Kerala Congress (M) |
| 2026 | Pazhakulam Madhu | Indian National Congress |

== Election results ==
Percentage change (±%) denotes the change in the number of votes from the immediate previous election.

=== 2026 ===
Kerala Legislative Assembly Election, 2026: Ranni
| Party | Candidate | Votes | % | ±% |
|---|---|---|---|---|
| INC | Pazhakulam Madhu | 54,652 | 44.13% | ▲3.92 |
| KC(M) | Pramod Narayan | 50,308 | 40.62% | ▼0.60 |
| TTP | Thomas K Samuel (Blesson) | 17,993 | 14.53% | ▼0.80 |
| Independent | Sreehari K P | 333 | 0.27% | |
| NOTA | None of the Above | 557 | 0.45% | |
| Majority | | 4,344 | 3.51% | |
| Turnout | | 1,23,843 | | |
| Registered electors | | | | |
| INC gain from KC(M) | | Swing | | |

=== 2021 ===
There were 1,93,684 registered voters in Ranni Assembly constituency for the 2021 Kerala Assembly election.

2021 Kerala Legislative Assembly election: Ranni
| Party | Candidate | Votes | % | ±% |
|---|---|---|---|---|
| KC(M) | Pramod Narayan | 52,669 | 41.22 | |
| INC | Rinku Cherian | 51,384 | 40.21 | |
| BDJS | Padmakumar K | 19,587 | 15.33 | ▼4.73 |
| NOTA | None of the above | 431 | 0.34 | |
| Margin of victory | | 1,285 | 1.01 | |
| Turnout | | 1,27,777 | 65.97 | ▼4.45 |
| KC(M) hold | | Swing | | |

=== 2016 ===
There were 1,90,196 registered voters in Ranni Assembly constituency for the 2016 Kerala Assembly election.

2016 Kerala Legislative Assembly election: Ranni
| Party | Candidate | Votes | % | ±% |
|---|---|---|---|---|
| CPI(M) | Raju Abraham | 58,749 | 43.87% | ▼4.64 |
| INC | Mariamma Cherian | 44,153 | 32.97% | ▼10.05 |
| BDJS | Padmakumar K. | 28,201 | 21.06% | |
| BSP | Prasad Uthimoodu | 1,072 | 0.80% | ▼0.28 |
| SDPI | Fawseena Thakbeer | 862 | 0.64% | ▼0.11 |
| NOTA | None of the above | 438 | 0.33% | |
| Independent | Geethamma Madhavan | 298 | 0.22% | |
| Independent | Varughese Thomas | 154 | 0.11% | |
| Margin of victory | | 14,596 | 10.90% | ▲5.42 |
| Turnout | | 1,33,927 | 70.42% | ▲1.90 |
| CPI(M) hold | | Swing | ▼4.64 | |

=== 2011 ===
There were 1,75,669 registered voters in the constituency for the 2011 election.

2011 Kerala Legislative Assembly election: Ranni
| Party | Candidate | Votes | % | ±% |
|---|---|---|---|---|
| CPI(M) | Raju Abraham | 58,391 | 48.51% | |
| INC | Peelipose Thomas | 51,777 | 43.02% | |
| BJP | Suresh Kadambari | 7,442 | 6.18% | |
| BSP | V. D. Saji Mon | 1,300 | 1.08% | |
| SDPI | Ibrahim Kutty | 905 | 0.75% | |
| Independent | S. Radhakrishan | 350 | 0.29% | |
| Independent | Ulakan Thevan | 196 | 0.16% | |
| Margin of victory | | 6,614 | 5.42% | |
| Turnout | | 1,20,361 | 68.52% | |
| CPI(M) hold | | Swing | | |

== See also ==
- Ranni
- Pathanamthitta district
- List of constituencies of the Kerala Legislative Assembly
- 2016 Kerala Legislative Assembly election
