= Kuppadi =

- village
- Location in Kerala, India Kuppadi (India)
- Coordinates: 11°40′45″N 76°15′45″E
- Country: India
- State: Kerala
- District: Wayanad

Population (2011)
  - Total: 26,662

Languages
  - Official: Malayalam, English
- Time zone: UTC+5:30 (IST)
- PIN: 673592
- ISO 3166 code: IN-KL
- Vehicle registration: KL-73

Kuppadi is a village near Sultan Bathery in Wayanad district in the state of Kerala, India.The famous St Mary's College, Sulthan Bathery is situated in this village.

== Population ==
According to 2011 Indian census, Kuppadi Village total population is 26662 and number of families are 6328. Female population is 50.6%. Village literacy rate is 90.53% and the female Literacy rate is 87.86%.

== Educational institutions ==
- St Mary's College, Sulthan Bathery

St. Mary's College, Sulthan Bathery is a Post Graduate Aided College managed by the Malankara Orthodox Syrian Church of the East is located in kuppadi. It was established in the year 1965. St. Mary's College is the first higher education College in Wayanad.

- St. Marys College Higher Secondary School
- Govt. High School Kuppadi

Established in 1934 as kidanganad LP school.

- Nirmala Matha Public School (CBSE)

It is also managed by malankara Orthodox Syrian Church of the east. Established in 1992.

== Other ==
Another main attraction of the village is Town Square which is a park near St Marys college ground. The St Marys college cricket ground is one of the ground recognised by Kerala Cricket Association. The temple Durga bagavathy Kshethram is situated in the centre of the town. The Village Office which is a smart village office is located near the mini civil station Sultan Bathery.

== Transportation ==
Kuppady is situated 3 km (2 mi) away from Sultan Battery. There are two bus service running through named 'Govind' and 'vanampadi'. The nearest railway station is at Mysore and the nearest airports are Kozhikode International Airport-120 km, Bengaluru International Airport-290 km, and Kannur International Airport, 58 km.

== Politics ==
The Kuppadi is the 12th division under Sultan Bathery municipality. K. Rasheed of CPI(M) is the councillor

Division 12 - Councillors list (Sulthan Bathery Municipality)
No:	Name	Party	Year	Position
1	Jisha Shaji	CPI(M)	18/11/2015 - 11/11/2020	Deputy Chairperson
2	K Rasheed	CPI(M)	28/12/2020 - incumbent	Councillor
