= Irulam =

- village
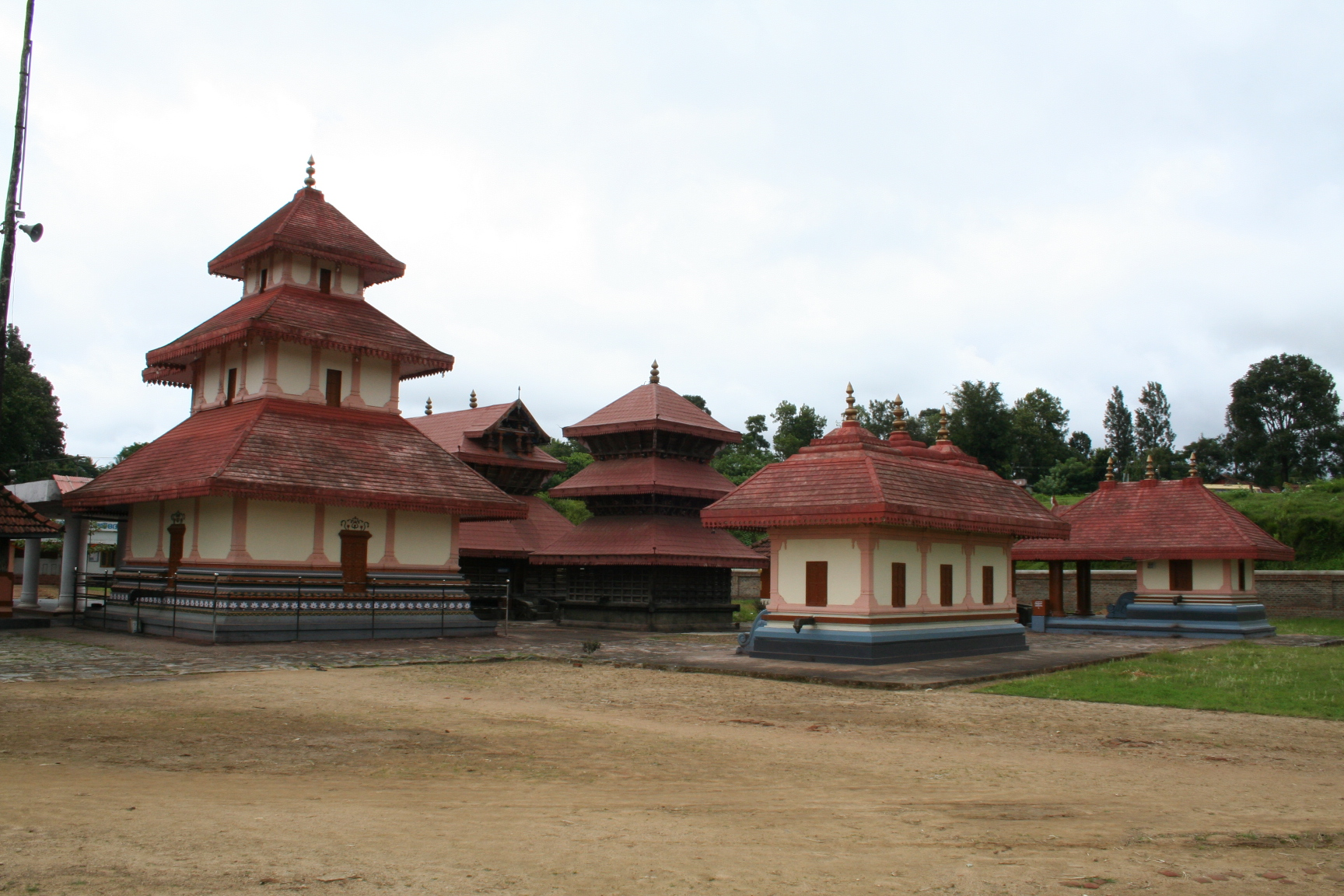
- Seetha Lava Kusha Temple, Irulam
- Interactive map of Irulam
- Coordinates: 11°45′0″N 76°11′0″E
- Country: India
- State: Kerala
- District: Wayanad

Population (2011)
  - Total: 21,052

Languages
  - Official: Malayalam
- Time zone: UTC+05:30 (IST)
- PIN: 673579
- ISO 3166 code: IN-KL
- Vehicle registration: KL-73
- Nearest city: Pulpally
- Literacy: 95%
- Lok Sabha constituency: Wayanad
- Vidhan Sabha constituency: Sultan Bathery

Irulam is a small village located in Sultan Bathery Municipality, Wayanad District of Kerala in India.

== Demographics ==
As of 2011 India census, Irulam had a population of 21052 with 10465 males and 10587 females.

== Image Gallery ==
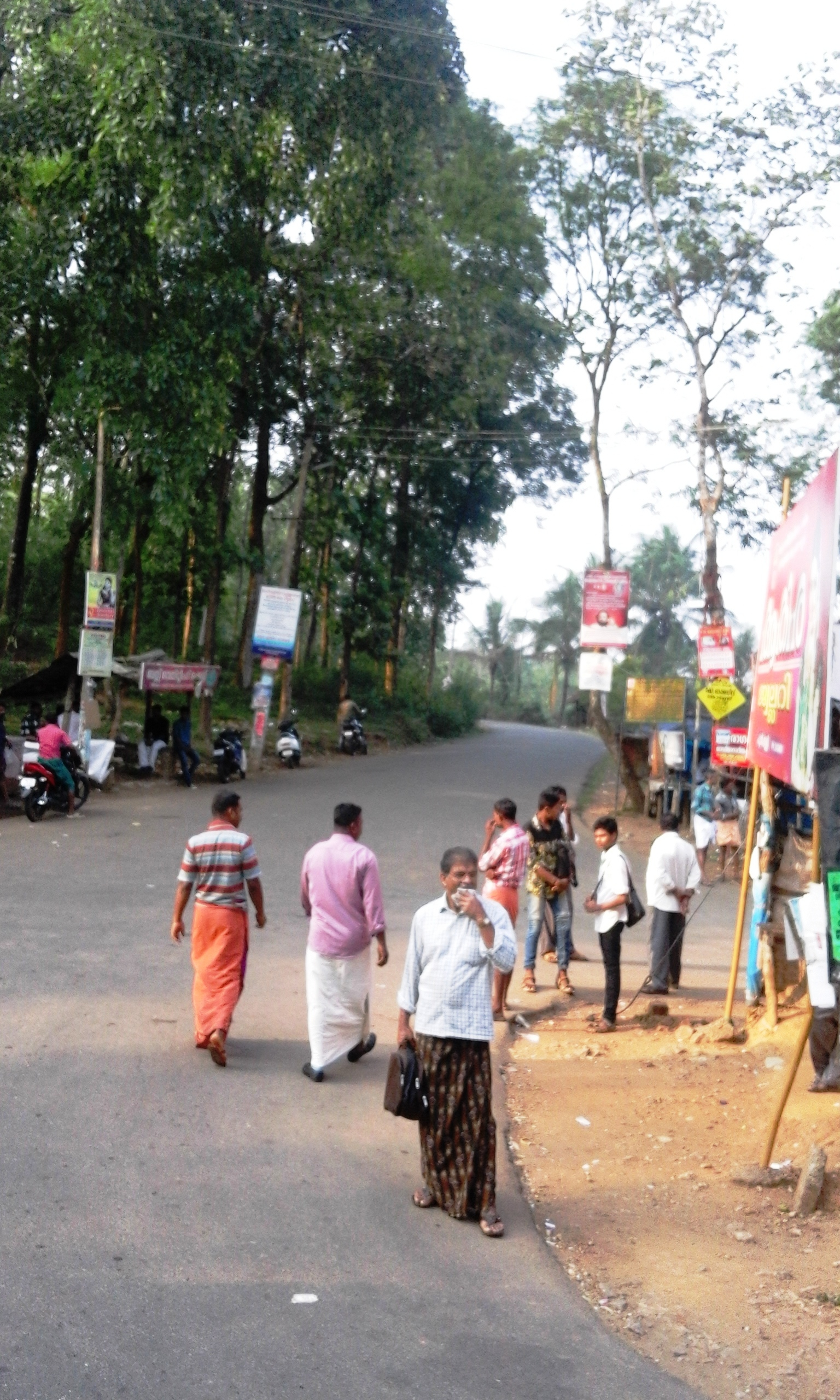
Irulam junction

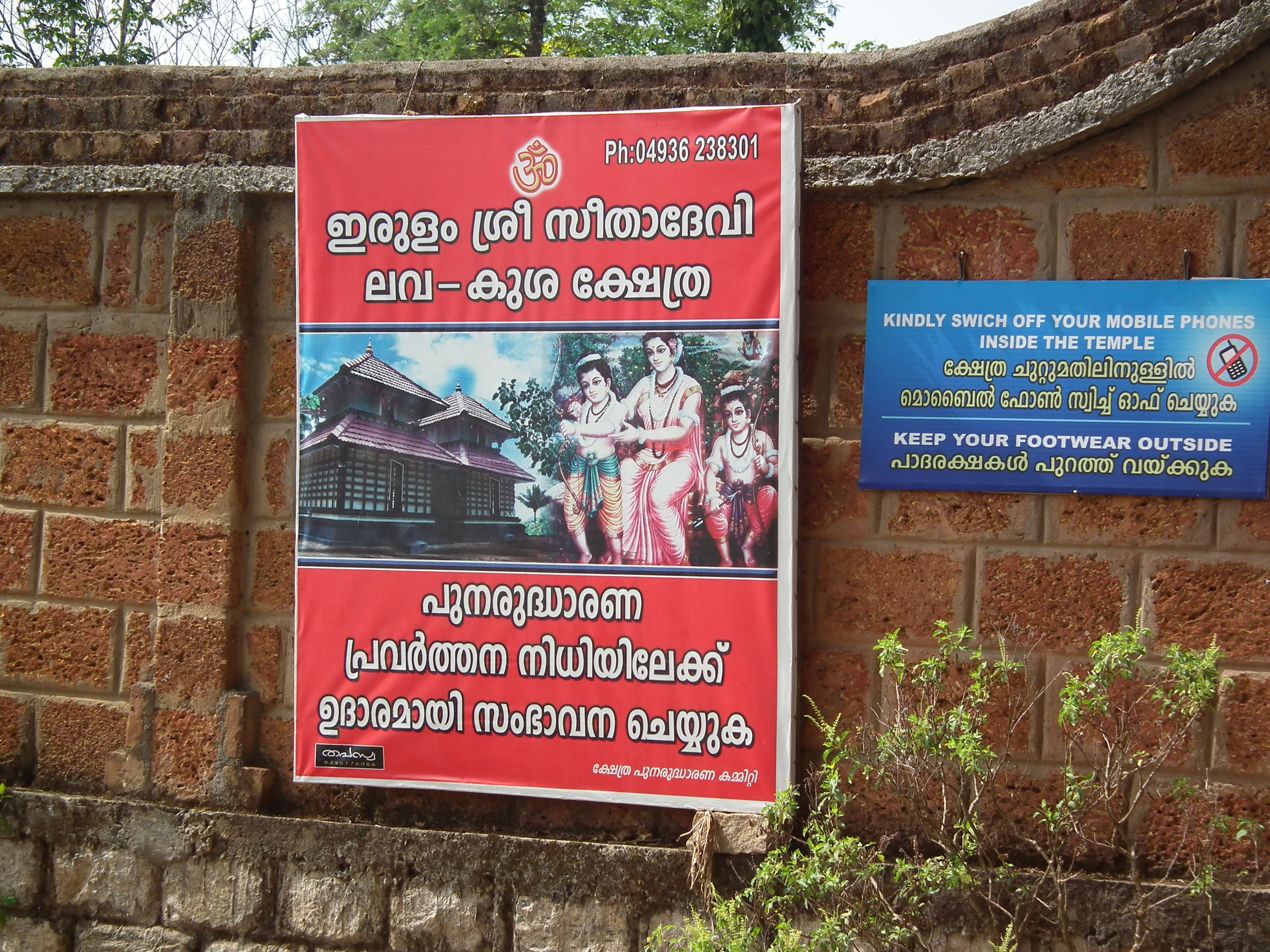
Temple Wall

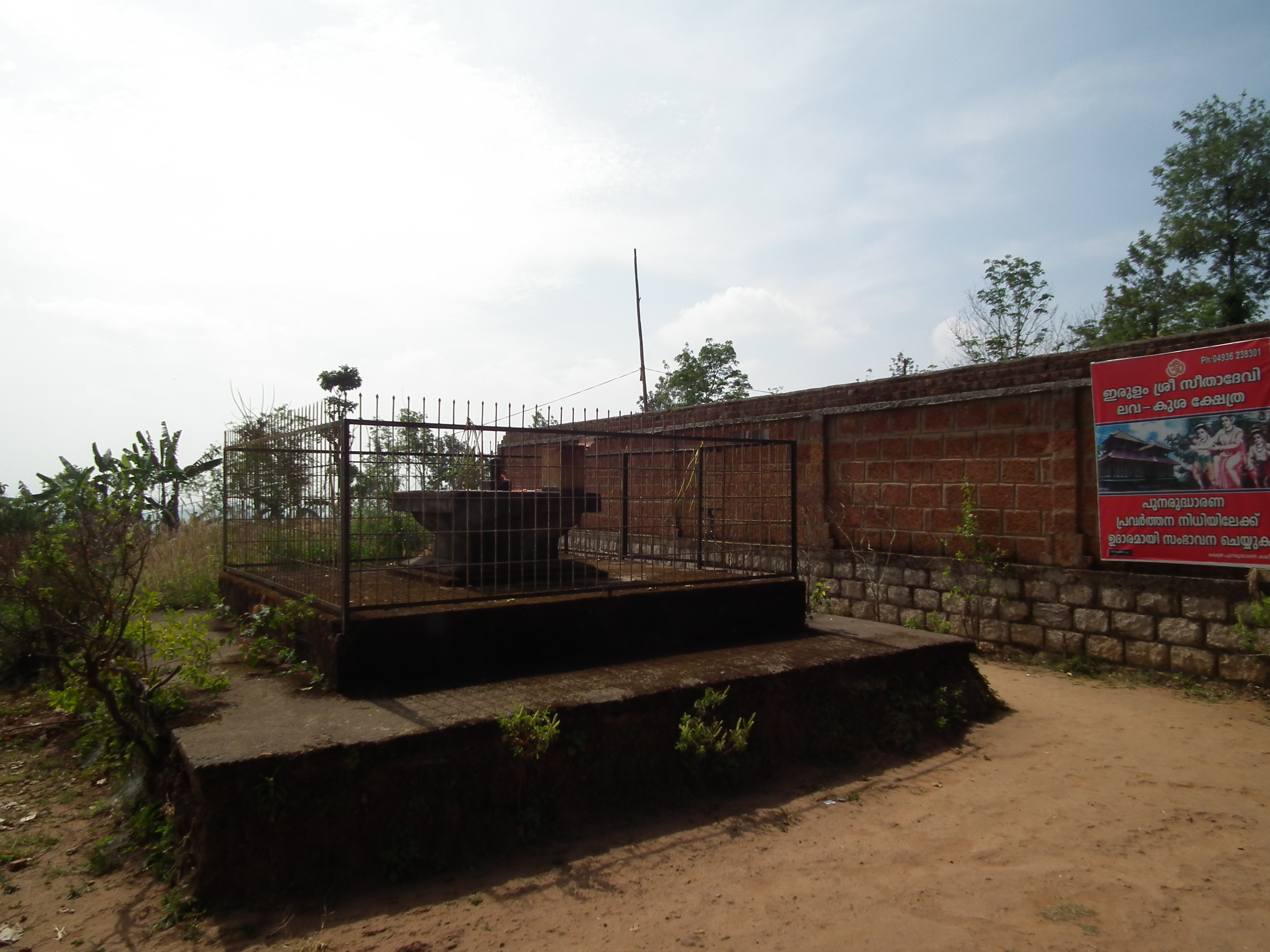
Mandapam

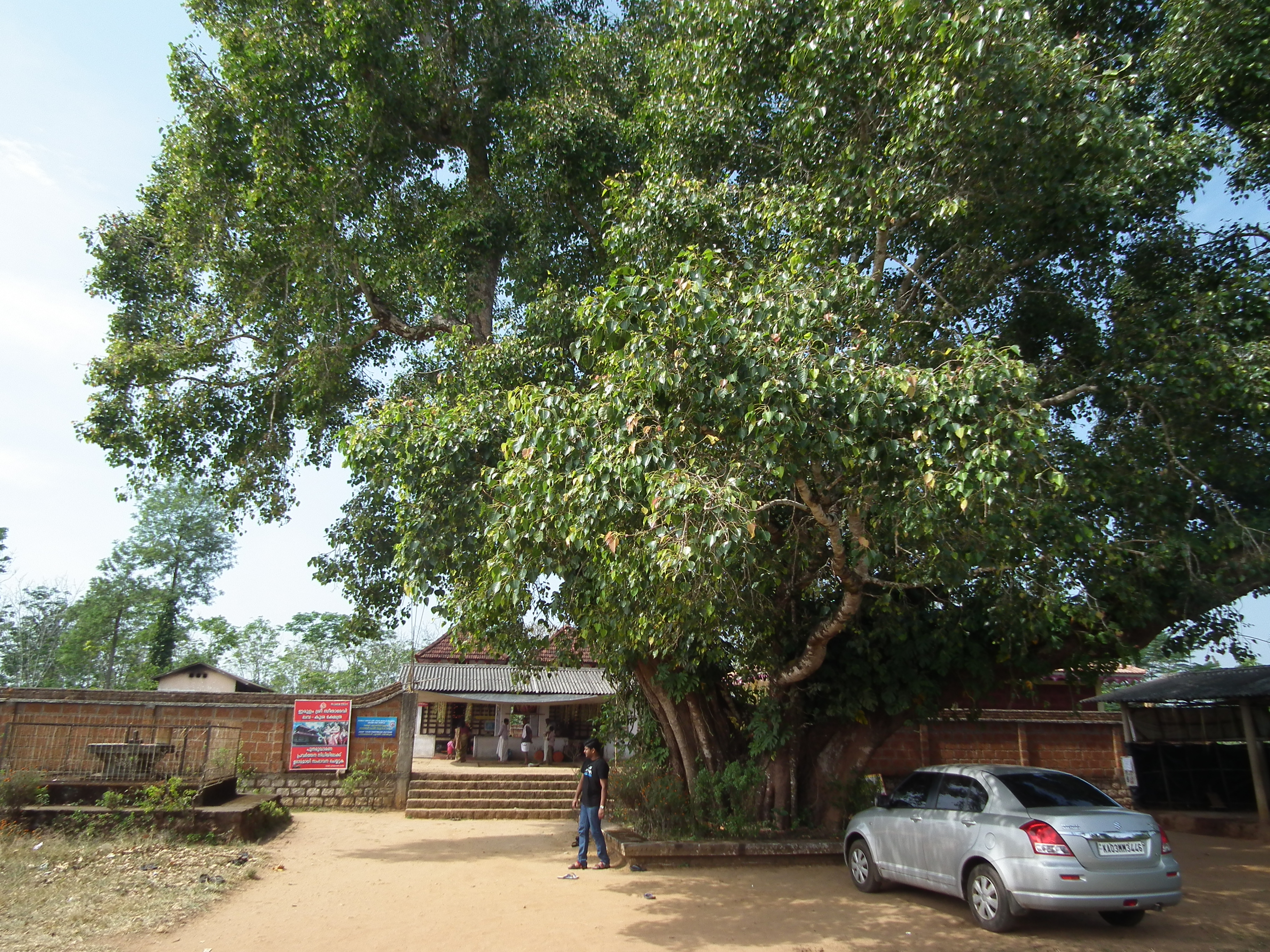
SeethaDevi Lava Kusha Temple
