= 1996 Kerala Legislative Assembly election =

- 27 April 1996

All 140 seats in the Kerala Legislative Assembly 71 seats needed for a majority
- Turnout: 71.16% (▼2.26)
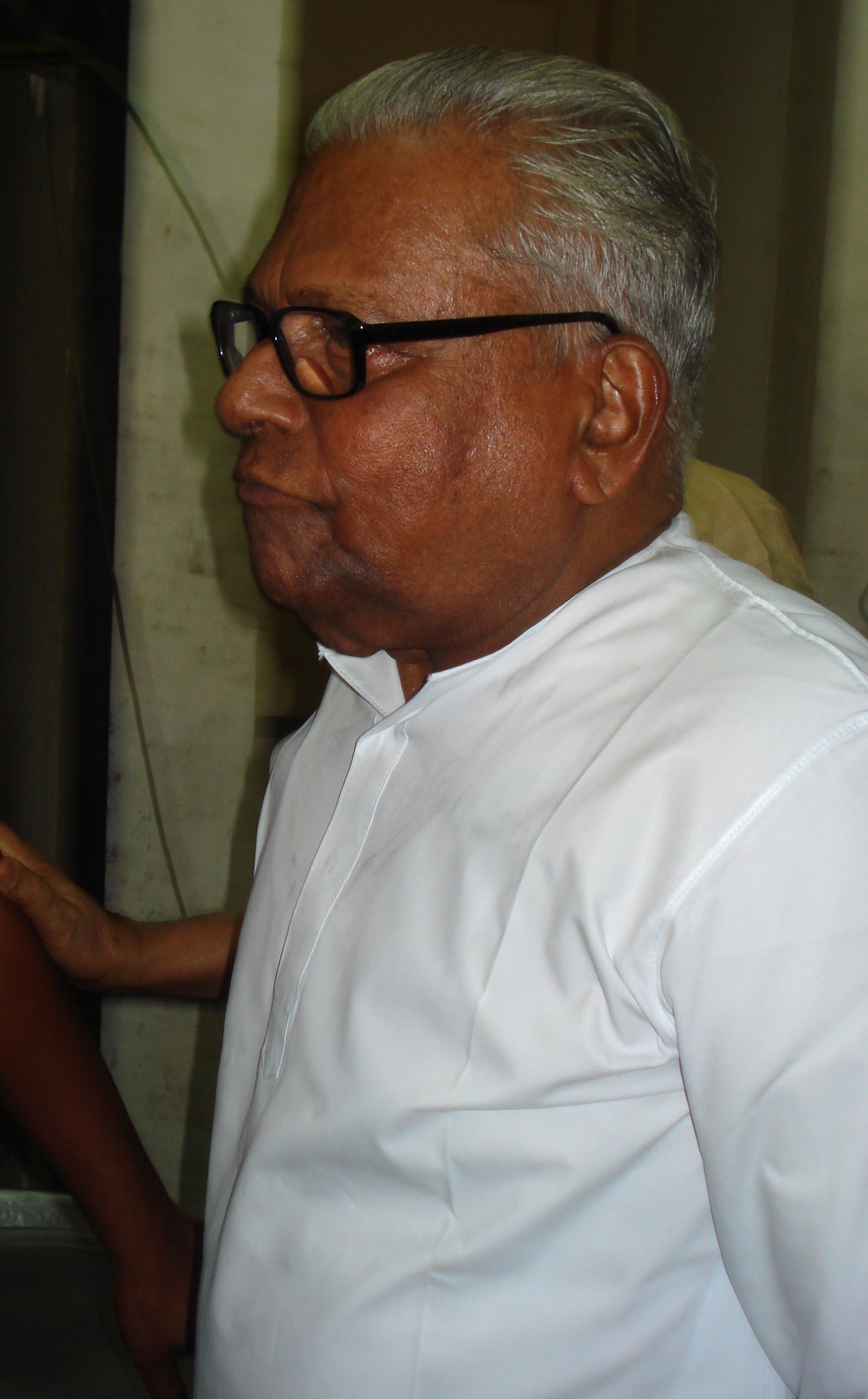

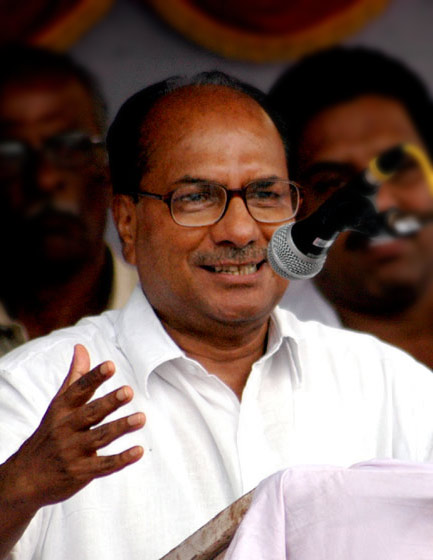
| | Majority party | Minority party |
|---|---|---|
| Leader | V. S. Achuthanandan | A. K. Antony |
| Party | CPI(M) | INC |
| Alliance | LDF | UDF |
| Leader's seat | Mararikulam (Lost) | Cherthala |
| Last election | 28 | 55 |
| Seats won | 40 | 37 |
| Seat change | ▲12 | ▼18 |
- Kerala, India; Kerala, one of the states in South India, has an electorate of more than 21 million people.

- Alliance wise Result
Chief Minister before election
A. K. Antony
INC
Elected Chief Minister
E. K. Nayanar
CPI(M)

The 1996 Kerala Legislative Assembly election was held in May 1996 to elect members to the Kerala State Assembly. Polls were held simultaneously in all 140 seats and resulted in a voter turnout of 71.16%.

The then Leader of opposition, V. S. Achuthanandan lost from Mararikulam, a Marxist bastion. It is only the second instance in Kerala that the chief ministerial candidate of a major party lost in an election (In 1965, R. Sankar, former Congress Chief Minister lost from the Attingal constituency. However, in that election, no party was able to form a government). On 20 May 1996, a 14 member cabinet of Left Democratic Front led by former Chief Minister E. K. Nayanar was sworn in. Nayanar was not an elected member of the assembly at that time, and was later elected from Thalassery Constituency. Nayanar subsequently went on to become the longest serving Chief Minister of the state.

== Parties and alliances ==
=== Left Democratic Front (Kerala) ===
Left Democratic Front (Kerala)

| Party | Flag | Symbol | Leader | Contesting Seats |
|---|---|---|---|---|
| Communist Party of India (Marxist) | | | V. S. Achuthanandhan | 62 |
| Communist Party of India | | | A. B. Bardhan | 22 |
| Janata Dal | | | | 13 |
| Kerala Congress | | | P. J. Joseph | 10 |
| Indian Congress (Socialist) | | | | 8 |
| Revolutionary Socialist Party | | | | 6 |
| Indian National League (Note: INL fielded 15 candidates out of which only 2 candidates were endorsed by LDF) | | | | 2 |
| LDF-Independents | | | | 17 |
| Total | | | | 140 |

=== United Democratic Front (Kerala) ===
United Democratic Front (Kerala)

| Party | Flag | Symbol | Leader | Contesting Seats |
|---|---|---|---|---|
| Indian National Congress (Indira) | | | A. K. Antony | 94 |
| Indian Union Muslim League | | | E. Ahamed | 22 |
| Kerala Congress (Mani) | | | K. M. Mani | 10 |
| Janathipathiya Samrakshana Samithy | | | K. R. Gouri Amma | 4 |
| Kerala Congress (Jacob) | | | T. M. Jacob | 4 |
| Communist Marxist Party Kerala State Committee | | | | 3 |
| Kerala Congress (B) | | | R. Balakrishna Pillai | 2 |
| Total | | | | 140 |

== List of Candidates ==
| Constituency | | LDF | | UDF | |
| # | Name | Party | Candidate | Party | Candidate |
|---|---|---|---|---|---|
| 1 | Manjeswar | CPI(M) | M. Ramanna Rai | IUML | Cherkalam Abdullah |
| 2 | Kasaragod | IND | N. A. Nellikunnu | IUML | C. T. Ahammed Ali |
| 3 | Udma | CPI(M) | P. Raghavan | INC | K. P. Kunhikannan |
| 4 | Hosdrug (SC) | CPI | M. Narayanan | INC | C. P. Krishnan |
| 5 | Trikkarpur | CPI(M) | K. P. Sateesh Chandran | INC | Sony Sebastian |
| 6 | Irikkur | KEC | A. J. Joseph | INC | K. C. Joseph |
| 7 | Payyannur | CPI(M) | Pinarayi Vijayan | INC | K. N. Kannoth |
| 8 | Taliparamba | CPI(M) | M. V. Govindan Master | INC | Satheesan Pacheni |
| 9 | Azhicode | CPI(M) | T. K. Balan | CMP | T. P. Hareendran |
| 10 | Cannanore | IND | N. Ramakrishnan | INC | K. Sudhakaran |
| 11 | Edakkad | CPI(M) | M. V. Jayarajan | INC | A. D. Mustafa |
| 12 | Tellicherry | CPI(M) | K. P. Mammu Master | INC | K. C. Kadambooran |
| 13 | Peringalam | JD | P. R. Kurup | IUML | K. M. Soopy |
| 14 | Kuthuparamba | CPI(M) | K. K. Shylaja | INC | M. P. Krishnan Nair |
| 15 | Peravoor | IC(S) | K. T. Kunnahammed | INC | K. P. Noorudeen |
| 16 | North Wynad (ST) | CPI(M) | K. C. Kunhiraman | INC | Radha Raghavan |
| 17 | Badagara | JD | C. K. Nanu | INC | C. Vathsalan |
| 18 | Nadapuram | CPI | Sathyan Mokeri | INC | K. C. Abu |
| 19 | Meppayur | CPI(M) | A. Kanaran | IUML | Pv Muhamed Areekode |
| 20 | Quilandy | CPI(M) | P. Viswan | INC | P. Sankaran |
| 21 | Perambra | CPI(M) | N. K. Radha | KC(M) | Roshy Augustine |
| 22 | Balusseri | IC(S) | A. C. Shanmukhadas | INC | R. K. Ravivarma |
| 23 | Koduvally | JD | C. Mohsin | IUML | C. Moyinkutty |
| 24 | Calicut-I | CPI(M) | M. Dasan | INC | A. Sujanapal |
| 25 | Calicut-II | CPI(M) | Elamaram Kareem | IUML | Qamarunnisa Anvar |
| 26 | Beypore | CPI(M) | T. K. Hamza | IUML | Ummer Pandikasala |
| 27 | Kunnamangalam (SC) | CPI(M) | C. P. Balan Vaidyar | IUML | A. P. Unnikrishnan |
| 28 | Thiruvambadi | IC(S) | Cyriac John | IUML | Abdurahiman Haji Av |
| 29 | Kalpetta | JD | Jainendra Kalpetta | INC | K. K. Ramachandran |
| 30 | Sultan's Battery | CPI(M) | Varghese Vaidyar | INC | K. C. Rosakutty |
| 31 | Wandoor (SC) | CPI(M) | N. Kannan | INC | Pandalam Sudhakaran |
| 32 | Nilambur | IND | Malayil Thomas Mathew | INC | Aryadan Muhammed |
| 33 | Manjeri | JD | P. M. Zafarulla | IUML | Ishaque Kurikkal |
| 34 | Malappuram | INL | P. M. A. Salam | IUML | M. K. Muneer |
| 35 | Kondotty | JD | K. P. Mohammed | IUML | P. K. K. Bava |
| 36 | Tirurangadi | IND | A. V. Abdu Haji | IUML | Kutty Ahamed Kutty |
| 37 | Tanur | IND | T. V. Moideen Kutty | IUML | Abdu Rabb |
| 38 | Tirur | IND | U. A. Naseer | IUML | E. T. Mohamed Basheer |
| 39 | Ponnani | CPI(M) | Muhammedkutty Paloli | INC | P. T. Mohanakrishnan |
| 40 | Kuttippuram | INL | Ibrahim Haji Mayyeri | IUML | P. K. Kunhalikutty |
| 41 | Mankada | IND | Manjalamkuzhi Ali | IUML | K. P. Abdul Majeed |
| 42 | Perinthalmanna | IND | A. Mohamed | IUML | Nalakath Sooppy |
| 43 | Thrithala (SC) | CPI(M) | V. K. Chandran | INC | A. P. Anilkumar |
| 44 | Pattambi | CPI | K. E. Ismail | INC | M. I. Shanavas |
| 45 | Ottapalam | IC(S) | V. C. Kabeer | INC | K. V. Prabhakaran Nambiar |
| 46 | Sreekrishnapuram | CPI(M) | Girija Surendran | INC | P. Balan |
| 47 | Mannarkkad | CPI | Jose Baby | IUML | Kalladi Mohammed |
| 48 | Malampuzha | CPI(M) | T. Sivadasa Menon | INC | M. Guruswamy |
| 49 | Palghat | CPI(M) | T. K. Noushad | INC | C. M. Sundaram |
| 50 | Chittur | JD | K. Krishnan Kutty | INC | K. Achuthan |
| 51 | Kollengode | CPI(M) | M. Chandran | INC | K. A. Chandran |
| 52 | Coyalmannam (SC) | CPI(M) | M. Narayanan | INC | M. V. Suresh |
| 53 | Alathur | CPI(M) | C. K. Rajendran | INC | R. Chellamma |
| 54 | Chelakara (SC) | CPI(M) | K. Radhakrishnan | INC | T. A. Radhakrishnan |
| 55 | Wadakkancherry | KEC | K. Mohandas | INC | V. Balaram |
| 56 | Kunnamkulam | CPI(M) | N. R. Balan | INC | T. V. Chandramohan |
| 57 | Cherpu | CPI | K. P. Rajendran | INC | M. K. Abdul Salam |
| 58 | Trichur | IND | M. R. Govindan | INC | Therambil Ramakrishnan |
| 59 | Ollur | CPI | C. N. Jayadevan | INC | P. P. George |
| 60 | Kodakara | CPI(M) | P. R. Rajan | INC | K. P. Viswanathan |
| 61 | Chalakudi | JD | N. M. Joseph | INC | Savithri Lakshmanan |
| 62 | Mala | CPI | V. K. Rajan | INC | Mercy Ravi |
| 63 | Irinjalakuda | IND | Lonappan Nambadan | KC(M) | Thomas Unniyadan |
| 64 | Manalur | IND | C. G. Santhakumar | INC | Rosamma Chacko |
| 65 | Guruvayoor | IND | P. T. Kunju Muhammed | IUML | R. P. Moidutty |
| 66 | Nattika | CPI | Krishnan Kaniyamparambil | INC | K. K. Rahulan |
| 67 | Kodungallur | CPI | Meenakshy Thamban | IND | K. Venu |
| 68 | Ankamali | KEC | M. V. Many | INC | P. J. Joy |
| 69 | Vadakkekara | CPI(M) | S. Sarma | INC | V. P. Marakkar |
| 70 | Parur | CPI | P. Raju | INC | V. D. Satheesan |
| 71 | Narakal (SC) | IC(S) | V. K. Babu | INC | M. A. Kuttappan |
| 72 | Ernakulam | CPI(M) | V. B. Cheriyan | INC | George Eden |
| 73 | Mattancherry | IND | M. A. Thomas | IUML | T. A. Ahamed Kabeer |
| 74 | Palluruthy | IC(S) | T. P. Peethambaran | INC | Dominic Presentation |
| 75 | Thrippunithura | CPI(M) | Gopi Kottamurikkal | INC | K. Babu |
| 76 | Alwaye | CPI(M) | Sarojini Balanandhan | INC | K. Mohammedali |
| 77 | Perumbavoor | JD | Raman Kartha | INC | P. P. Thankachan |
| 78 | Kunnathunad | CPI(M) | M. P. Vargheese | INC | T. H. Musthaffa |
| 79 | Piravom | IND | C. Poulose | KC(J) | T. M. Jacob |
| 80 | Muvattupuzha | IND | P. M. Thomas | KC(J) | Johny Nelloor |
| 81 | Kothamangalam | CPI(M) | T. M. Meethian | INC | V. J. Poulose |
| 82 | Thodupuzha | KEC | P. J. Joseph | INC | P. T. Thomas |
| 83 | Devicolam (SC) | CPI(M) | S. Sundaramanickom | INC | A. K. Moni |
| 84 | Idukki | JD | P. P. Sulaiman Rawther | KC(M) | Joy Vettikuzhy |
| 85 | Udumbanchola | CPI(M) | M. M. Moni | INC | E. M. Augusthy |
| 86 | Peermade | CPI | C. A. Kurian | KC(J) | Mathew Stephen |
| 87 | Kanjirappally | CPI(M) | K. J. Thomas | INC | George J. Mathew |
| 88 | Vazhoor | CPI | Kanam Rajendran | KC(M) | K. Narayana Kurup |
| 89 | Changanacherry | CPI(M) | P. Ravindranath | KC(M) | C. F. Thomas |
| 90 | Kottayam | CPI(M) | T. K. Ramakrishnan | INC | Mohan Sankar |
| 91 | Ettumanoor | CPI(M) | Vaikom Viswan | KC(M) | Thomas Chazhikadan |
| 92 | Puthuppally | CPI(M) | Reji Zachariah | INC | Oommen Chandy |
| 93 | Poonjar | KEC | P. C. George | KC(M) | Joy Abraham |
| 94 | Palai | IND | C. K. Jeevan | KC(M) | K. M. Mani |
| 95 | Kaduthuruthy | KEC | Mons Joseph | KC(J) | P. M. Mathew |
| 96 | Vaikom (SC) | CPI | M. K. Kesavan | INC | K. K. Balakrishnan |
| 97 | Aroor | CPI(M) | B. Vinod | JSS | K. R. Gowri Amma |
| 98 | Sherthalai | CPI | C. K. Chandrappan | INC | A. K. Antony |
| 99 | Mararikulam | CPI(M) | V. S. Achuthanandan | INC | P. J. Francis |
| 100 | Alleppey | CPI | P. S. Somasekharan | INC | K. C. Venugopal |
| 101 | Ambalapuzha | CPI(M) | Suseela Gopalan | INC | Devadath G. Purakkad |
| 102 | Kuttanad | KEC | K. C. Joseph | INC | J. Joseph |
| 103 | Haripad | RSP | A. V. Thamarakshan | INC | N. Mohan Kumar |
| 104 | Kayamkulam | CPI(M) | G. Sudhakaran | INC | Thachadi Prabhakaran |
| 105 | Thiruvalla | JD | Oommen Thalavady | KC(M) | Mamman Mathai |
| 106 | Kallooppara | KEC | T. S. John | KC(M) | Joseph M. Puthusseri |
| 107 | Aranmula | IND | Kadammanitta Ramakrishnan | CMP | M. V. Raghavan |
| 108 | Chengannur | IC(S) | Mammen Iype | INC | Sobhana George |
| 109 | Mavelikara | CPI(M) | P. N. Viswanathan | INC | M. Murali |
| 110 | Pandalam (SC) | CPI(M) | P. K. Kumaran | JSS | Pandalam Bharathan |
| 111 | Ranni | CPI(M) | Raju Abraham | INC | Peeilipose Thomas |
| 112 | Pathanamthitta | KEC | D. K. John | INC | K. K. Nair |
| 113 | Konni | CPI(M) | A. Padmakumar | INC | Adoor Prakash |
| 114 | Pathanapuram | CPI | K. Prakash Babu | KC(B) | Thomas Kuthiravattam |
| 115 | Punaloor | CPI | P. K. Sreenivasan | INC | Punalur Madhu |
| 116 | Chadayamangalam | CPI | R. Latha Devi | INC | Prayar Gopalakrishnan |
| 117 | Kottarakara | CPI(M) | George Mathew | KC(B) | R. Balkrishna Pillai |
| 118 | Neduvathur (SC) | CPI(M) | B. Raghavan | INC | Ezhukone Narayanan |
| 119 | Adoor | CPI(M) | K. N. Balagopal | INC | Thiruvanchoor Radhakrishnan |
| 120 | Kunnathur (SC) | RSP | T. Nanoo | INC | Visalakshy |
| 121 | Karunagapally | CPI | E. Chandrasekharan Nair | JSS | Sathjith |
| 122 | Chavara | RSP | Baby John | INC | K. Karunakaran Pillai |
| 123 | Kundara | CPI(M) | J. Mercykuttiamma | INC | Alphonsa John |
| 124 | Quilon | RSP | Babu Divakaran | INC | Kadavoor Sivadasan |
| 125 | Eravipuram | RSP | V. P. Ramakrishna Pillai | IUML | A. Yoonus Kunju |
| 126 | Chathanoor | CPI | P. Raveendran | INC | C. V. Padmarajan |
| 127 | Varkala | CPI(M) | A. Ali Hassan | INC | G. Priyadarsanan |
| 128 | Attingal | CPI(M) | Anathalavattom Anandan | INC | Vakkom Purushothaman |
| 129 | Kilimanoor (SC) | CPI | Bhargavi Thankappan | INC | M. Radhakrishnan |
| 130 | Vamanapuram | CPI(M) | Pirappancode Murali | JSS | C. K. Sitaram |
| 131 | Ariyanad | RSP | K. P. Sankaradas | INC | G. Karthikeyan |
| 132 | Nedumangad | CPI | M. Radhakrishnan | INC | Palode Ravi |
| 133 | Kazhakuttam | CPI(M) | K. Surendran | IND | E. A. Rasheed |
| 134 | Trivandrum North | CPI(M) | M. Vijayakumar | INC | T. Saratchandra Prasad |
| 135 | Trivandrum West | KEC | Antony Raju | INC | M. M. Hassan |
| 136 | Trivandrum East | IC(S) | K. Krishna Pillai | INC | B. Vijaya Kumar |
| 137 | Nemom | CPI(M) | Venganoor P. Bhaskaran | INC | K. Mohankumar |
| 138 | Kovalam | JD | A. Neelalohithadasan N. | INC | George Mascrene |
| 139 | Neyyattinkara | JD | Charupara Ravi | INC | Thampanoor Ravi |
| 140 | Parassala | CPI(M) | W. R. Heeba | INC | M. R. Reghuchandrabal |

== Results ==
Party-wise vote share of 1996 Kerala Assembly Elections
| Sl.No: | Party | Contested | Won | Popular Votes | Share (%) |
|---|---|---|---|---|---|
National Parties
| 1 | Communist Party of India (Marxist) (CPI(M)) | 62 | 40 | 30,78,723 | 21.59 |
| 5 | All India Indira Congress (Tiwari) (AIIC(T)) | 8 | 0 | 8,549 | 0.06 |
| 2 | Bharatiya Janata Party (BJP) | 123 | 0 | 7,81,090 | 5.48 |
| 3 | Communist Party of India (CPI) | 22 | 18 | 10,86,350 | 7.62 |
| 4 | Indian National Congress | 94 | 37 | 43,40,717 | 30.43 |
| 6 | Janata Dal (JD) | 13 | 4 | 5,87,716 | 4.12 |
| 7 | Janata Party (JP) | 21 | 0 | 8,027 | 0.06 |
State Parties
| 1 | Bahujan Samaj Party (BSP) | 12 | 0 | 17,872 | 0.13 |
| 2 | All India Forward Bloc (FBL) | 6 | 0 | 2,522 | 0.02 |
| 3 | Indian Congress (Socialist) (IC(S)) | 9 | 3 | 3,55,755 | 2.49 |
| 4 | Kerala Congress (KEC) | 10 | 6 | 4,42,421 | 3.10 |
| 5 | Kerala Congress (Mani) (KCM) | 10 | 5 | 4,53,614 | 3.18 |
| 6 | Indian Union Muslim League (IUML) | 22 | 13 | 10,25,556 | 7.19 |
| 7 | Revolutionary Socialist Party (RSP) | 6 | 5 | 2,94,744 | 2.07 |
| 8 | Shiv Sena (SHS) | 16 | 0 | 4,445 | 0.03 |
Unrecognised Parties
| 1 | Bharatiya Labour Party (BLP) | 1 | 0 | 3,632 | 0.03 |
| 2 | Communist Marxist Party (CMPKSC) | 3 | 0 | 69,934 | 0.49 |
| 3 | Indian Labour Congress (ILC) | 1 | 0 | 630 | 0.00 |
| 4 | Indian National League (INL) | 3 | 0 | 139775 | 0.89 |
| 5 | Janadhipatya Samrakshana Samithi (JSS) | 4 | 1 | 1,82,210 | 1.28 |
| 6 | Kerala Congress (B) (KC(B)) | 2 | 1 | 91,968 | 0.64 |
| 7 | Kerala Congress (Jacob) (KCJ) | 4 | 2 | 455748 | 2.9 |
| 8 | Peoples Democratic Party (PDP) | 50 | 0 | 1,02,226 | 0.06 |
| 9 | Social Action Party (SAP) | 9 | 0 | 1,916 | 0.19 |
| 10 | Socialist Labour Action Party (SLAP) | 1 | 0 | 58 | 0.07 |
| 11 | Samajwadi Jan Parishad (SWJP) | 1 | 0 | 167 | 0.00 |
| Others/ Independents | | 672 | 5 | 10,95,761 | 7.68 |
| Total | | 1,201 | 140 | 14,262,692 | 100 |

=== By-constituency ===
Detailed constituency-wise Results
| Sl No. | Constituency Name | Category | Winner Candidates Name | Gender | Party | Vote | Runner-up | Gender | Party | vote | Majority |
|---|---|---|---|---|---|---|---|---|---|---|---|
| 1 | Manjeshwar | GEN | Cherkalam Abdullah | M | IUML | 34705 | V.Balakrishna Shetty | M | BJP | 32413 | 2292 |
| 2 | Kasaragod | GEN | C.T.Ahammed Ali | M | IUML | 33932 | K.Madhava Herala | M | BJP | 30149 | 3783 |
| 3 | Udma | GEN | P. Raghavan | M | CPI(M) | 50854 | K.P.Kunhikannan | M | INC | 40459 | 10395 |
| 4 | Hosdrug | (SC) | M. Narayanan | M | CPI | 62786 | C.P. Krishnan | M | INC | 50977 | 11809 |
| 5 | Trikaripur | GEN | K.P.Sateesh Chandran | M | CPI(M) | 71234 | Sony Sebastian | M | INC | 55486 | 15748 |
| 6 | Irikkur | GEN | K.C. Joseph | M | INC | 62407 | A.J. Joseph | M | KEC | 44575 | 17832 |
| 7 | Payyannur | GEN | Pinarayi Vijayan | M | CPI(M) | 70870 | K.N.Kannoth | M | INC | 42792 | 28078 |
| 8 | Taliparamba | GEN | M.V.Govindan Master | M | CPI(M) | 70550 | Satheesan Pacheni | M | INC | 52933 | 17617 |
| 9 | Azhikode | GEN | T.K.Balan | M | CPI(M) | 52240 | T.P.Hareendran | M | CMPKSC | 37734 | 14506 |
| 10 | Cannanore | GEN | K.Sudhakaran | M | INC | 45148 | N.Ramakrishnan | M | IND | 37286 | 7862 |
| 11 | Edakkad | GEN | M.V.Jayarajan | M | CPI(M) | 59239 | A.D.Mustafa | M | INC | 51955 | 7284 |
| 12 | Tellicherry | GEN | K.P.Mammu Master | M | CPI(M) | 51985 | K.C.Kadambooran | M | INC | 33635 | 18350 |
| 13 | Peringalam | GEN | P.R.Kurup | M | JD | 51921 | K.M.Soopy | M | IUML | 37841 | 14080 |
| 14 | Kuthuparamba | GEN | K.K.Shylaja | F | CPI(M) | 61519 | M.P.Krishnan Nair | M | INC | 42526 | 18993 |
| 15 | Peravoor | GEN | K.T.Kunnahammed | M | ICS | 57450 | K.P.Noorudeen | M | INC | 57264 | 186 |
| 16 | North Wynad | (ST) | Radha Raghavan | F | INC | 50617 | K.C.Kunhiraman | M | CPI(M) | 42652 | 7965 |
| 17 | Badagara | GEN | C K Nanu | M | JD | 67145 | Vathsalan, C. | M | INC | 40159 | 26986 |
| 18 | Nadapuram | GEN | Sathyan Mokeri | M | CPI | 65561 | Abu, K.C. | M | INC | 50944 | 14617 |
| 19 | Meppayur | GEN | A.Kanaran | M | CPI(M) | 65932 | Pv Muhamed Areekode | M | IUML | 49388 | 16544 |
| 20 | Quilandy | GEN | P.Viswan | M | CPI(M) | 59242 | P.Sankaran | M | INC | 54391 | 4851 |
| 21 | Perambra | GEN | N.K.Radha | F | CPI(M) | 59328 | Roshy Augustine | M | KEC(M) | 56576 | 2752 |
| 22 | Balusseri | GEN | A.C.Shanmukhadas | M | ICS | 55588 | R.K.Ravivarma | M | INC | 40558 | 15030 |
| 23 | Koduvally | GEN | C.Moyinkutty | M | IUML | 49752 | C.Mohsin | M | JD | 49658 | 94 |
| 24 | Calicut- I | GEN | M. Dasan | M | CPI(M) | 46455 | A.Sujanapal | M | INC | 43184 | 3271 |
| 25 | Calicut- II | GEN | Elamaram Kareem | M | CPI(M) | 49105 | Qamarunnisa Anvar | F | IUML | 40339 | 8766 |
| 26 | Beypore | GEN | T.K.Hamza | M | CPI(M) | 62144 | Ummer Pandikasala | M | IUML | 50048 | 12096 |
| 27 | Kunnamangalam | (SC) | C.P.Balan Vaidyar | M | CPI(M) | 51401 | A.P.Unnikrishnan | M | IUML | 44785 | 6616 |
| 28 | Thiruvambady | GEN | Abdurahiman Haji Av | M | IUML | 48942 | P. Cyriac John | M | ICS | 43820 | 5122 |
| 29 | Kalpetta | GEN | K.K. Ramachandran | M | INC | 49577 | Jainendra Kalpetta | M | JD | 42655 | 6922 |
| 30 | Sultan Bathery | GEN | P. V. Varghese Vaidyar | M | CPI(M) | 50316 | K. C. Rosakutty | F | INC | 49020 | 1296 |
| 31 | Wandoor | (SC) | N Kannan | M | CPI(M) | 55399 | Pandalam Sudhakaran | M | INC | 51198 | 4201 |
| 32 | Nilambur | GEN | Aryadan Muhammed | M | INC | 61945 | Malayil Thomas Mathew | M | IND | 55252 | 6693 |
| 33 | Manjeri | GEN | Shaque Kurikkal | M | IUML | 62029 | P.M.Zafarulla | M | JD | 33374 | 28655 |
| 34 | Malappuram | GEN | M.K.Muneer | M | IUML | 52593 | P.M.A.Salam | M | INL | 32072 | 20521 |
| 35 | Kondotty | GEN | P K.K.Bava | M | IUML | 57728 | K.P.Mohammed | M | JD | 31590 | 26138 |
| 36 | Tirurangadi | GEN | Kutty Ahamed Kutty | M | IUML | 48953 | A.V.Abdu Haji | M | IND | 40921 | 8032 |
| 37 | Tanur | GEN | Abdu Rabb | M | IUML | 48603 | T.V. Moideen Kutty | M | IND | 28590 | 20013 |
| 38 | Tirur | GEN | E.T.Mohamed Basheer | M | IUML | 52037 | U.A.Naseer | M | IND | 42353 | 9684 |
| 39 | Ponnani | GEN | Muhammedkutty Paloli | M | CPI(M) | 49594 | P.T.Mohanakrishnan | M | INC | 40976 | 8618 |
| 40 | Kuttippuram | GEN | P.K. Kunhalikutty | M | IUML | 46943 | Ibrahim Haji Mayyeri | M | INL | 22247 | 24696 |
| 41 | Mankada | GEN | K.P. Abdul Majeed | M | IUML | 52044 | Manjalamkuzhi Ali | M | IND | 50990 | 1054 |
| 42 | Perinthalmanna | GEN | Nalakath Sooppy | M | IUML | 55008 | A.Mohamed | M | IND | 48760 | 6248 |
| 43 | Thrithala | (SC) | V.K.Chandran | M | CPI(M) | 46410 | A.P.Anilkumar | M | INC | 42009 | 4401 |
| 44 | Pattambi | GEN | K.E.Ismail | M | CPI | 43984 | M.I.Shanavas | M | INC | 38510 | 5474 |
| 45 | Ottapalam | GEN | V.C.Kabeer | M | ICS | 40615 | K.V. Prabhakaran Nambiar | M | INC | 33257 | 7358 |
| 46 | Sreekrishnapuram | GEN | Girija Surendran | F | CPI(M) | 55108 | P. Balan | M | INC | 51091 | 4017 |
| 47 | Mannarkkad | GEN | Jose Baby | M | CPI | 57688 | Kalladi Mohammed | M | IUML | 50720 | 6968 |
| 48 | Malampuzha | GEN | T.Sivadasa Menon | M | CPI(M) | 54033 | M.Guruswamy | M | INC | 35254 | 18779 |
| 49 | Palghat | GEN | T.K.Noushad | M | CPI(M) | 39198 | C.M.Sundaram | M | INC | 38602 | 596 |
| 50 | Chittur | GEN | Achuthan, K. | M | INC | 47894 | K.Krishnan Kutty | M | JD | 47458 | 436 |
| 51 | Kollengode | GEN | K.A.Chandran | M | INC | 48530 | M.Chandran | M | CPI(M) | 47393 | 1137 |
| 52 | Coyalmannam | (SC) | M.Narayanan | M | CPI(M) | 50349 | M.V.Suresh | M | INC | 39853 | 10496 |
| 53 | Alathur | GEN | C.K.Rajendran | M | CPI(M) | 53763 | R.Chellamma | F | INC | 41597 | 12166 |
| 54 | Chelakara | (SC) | K.Radhakrishnan | M | CPI(M) | 44260 | T.A.Radhakrishnan | M | INC | 41937 | 2323 |
| 55 | Wadakkanchery | GEN | V.Balaram | M | INC | 51050 | K.Mohandas | M | KEC | 41372 | 9678 |
| 56 | Kunnamkulam | GEN | N.R.Balan | M | CPI(M) | 49289 | T.V. Chandramohan | M | INC | 48405 | 884 |
| 57 | Cherpu | GEN | K.P.Rajendran | M | CPI | 49506 | M.K.Abdul Salam | M | INC | 44314 | 5192 |
| 58 | Trichur | GEN | Therambil Ramakrishnan | M | INC | 49597 | M.R.Govindan | M | IND | 39388 | 10209 |
| 59 | Ollur | GEN | C.N.Jayadevan | M | CPI | 52757 | P.P.George | M | INC | 48389 | 4368 |
| 60 | Kodakara | GEN | K. P.Viswanathan | M | INC | 48366 | P.R.Rajan | M | CPI(M) | 46220 | 2146 |
| 61 | Chalakudi | GEN | Savithri Lakshmanan | F | INC | 48810 | N.M.Joseph | M | JD | 37644 | 11166 |
| 62 | Mala | GEN | V.K.Rajan | M | CPI | 49993 | Mercy Ravi | F | INC | 46752 | 3241 |
| 63 | Irinjalakuda | GEN | Lonappan Nambadan | M | IND | 49421 | Thomas Unniyadan | M | KEC(M) | 43295 | 6126 |
| 64 | Manalur | GEN | Rosamma Chacko | F | INC | 39700 | C.G.Santhakumar | M | IND | 38568 | 1132 |
| 65 | Guruvayoor | GEN | P.T. Kunju Muhammed | M | IND | 39870 | R.P.Moidutty | M | IUML | 37034 | 2836 |
| 66 | Nattika | GEN | Krishnan Kaniyamparambil | M | CPI | 47826 | K.K.Rahulan | M | INC | 38135 | 9691 |
| 67 | Kodungallur | GEN | Meenakshy Thamban | F | CPI | 51343 | K.Venu | M | IND | 37234 | 14109 |
| 68 | Ankamali | GEN | P.J.Joy | M | INC | 56252 | M.V.Many | M | KEC | 55708 | 544 |
| 69 | Vadakkekara | GEN | S.Sarma | M | CPI(M) | 50200 | V.P.Marakkar | M | INC | 49831 | 369 |
| 70 | Parur | GEN | P.Raju | M | CPI | 39723 | V.D.Satheesan | M | INC | 38607 | 1116 |
| 71 | Narakkal | (SC) | M.A. Kuttappan | M | INC | 42920 | V.K.Babu | M | ICS | 41933 | 987 |
| 72 | Ernakulam | GEN | George Eden | M | INC | 49908 | V.B.Cheriyan | M | CPI(M) | 39168 | 10740 |
| 73 | Mattancherry | GEN | M.A.Thomas | M | IND | 24003 | T.A.Ahamed Kabeer | M | IUML | 23578 | 425 |
| 74 | Palluruthy | GEN | Dominic Presentation | M | INC | 52900 | T.P. Peethambaran | M | ICS | 51790 | 1110 |
| 75 | Thrippunithura | GEN | K.Babu | M | INC | 69256 | Gopi Kottamurikkal | M | CPI(M) | 54483 | 14773 |
| 76 | Alwaye | GEN | K.Mohammedali | M | INC | 57902 | Sarojini Balanandhan | F | CPI(M) | 40480 | 17422 |
| 77 | Perumbavoor | GEN | P.P.Thankachan | M | INC | 51266 | Raman Kartha | M | JD | 46483 | 4783 |
| 78 | Kunnathunad | GEN | M.P.Vargheese | M | CPI(M) | 50034 | T.H.Musthaffa | M | INC | 49974 | 60 |
| 79 | Piravom | GEN | T.M.Jacob | M | KEC(J) | 51873 | C.Poulose | M | IND | 44165 | 7708 |
| 80 | Muvattupuzha | GEN | Johny Nelloor | M | KEC(J) | 47841 | P.M.Thomas | M | IND | 38145 | 9696 |
| 81 | Kothamangalam | GEN | V.J.Poulose | M | INC | 49874 | T.M.Meethian | M | CPI(M) | 43783 | 6091 |
| 82 | Thodupuzha | GEN | P.J.Joseph | M | KEC | 63414 | P.T.Thomas | M | INC | 59290 | 4124 |
| 83 | Devicolam | (SC) | A.K.Moni | M | INC | 51733 | S.Sundaramanickom | M | CPI(M) | 48497 | 3236 |
| 84 | Idukki | GEN | P.P. Sulaiman Rawther | M | JD | 52443 | Joy Vettikuzhy | M | KEC(M) | 46030 | 6413 |
| 85 | Udumbanchola | GEN | E.M.Augusthy | M | INC | 57266 | M.M.Moni | M | CPI(M) | 52599 | 4667 |
| 86 | Peermade | GEN | C.A.Kurian | M | CPI | 40842 | Mathew Stephen | M | KEC(J) | 38435 | 2407 |
| 87 | Kanjirappally | GEN | George J.Mathew | M | INC | 47535 | K.J.Thomas | M | CPI(M) | 40609 | 6926 |
| 88 | Vazhoor | GEN | K.Narayana Kurup | M | KEC(M) | 40503 | Kanam Rajendran | M | CPI | 37987 | 2516 |
| 89 | Changanacherry | GEN | C.F.Thomas | M | KEC(M) | 50784 | P.Ravindranath | M | CPI(M) | 43182 | 7602 |
| 90 | Kottayam | GEN | T.K.Ramakrishnan | M | CPI(M) | 52609 | Mohan Sankar | M | INC | 45545 | 7064 |
| 91 | Ettumanoor | GEN | Thomas Chazhikadan | M | KEC(M) | 53632 | Vaikom Viswan | M | CPI(M) | 39759 | 13873 |
| 92 | Puthuppally | GEN | Oommen Chandy | M | INC | 54147 | Reji Zachariah | M | CPI(M) | 43992 | 10155 |
| 93 | Poonjar | GEN | P.C.George | M | KEC | 48834 | Joy Abraham | M | KEC(M) | 38698 | 10136 |
| 94 | Palai | GEN | K.M.Mani | M | KEC(M) | 52550 | C.K.Jeevan | M | IND | 28760 | 23790 |
| 95 | Kaduthuruthy | GEN | Mons Joseph | M | KEC | 39131 | P.M.Mathew | M | KEC(J) | 23965 | 15166 |
| 96 | Vaikom | (SC) | M.K.Kesavan | M | CPI | 52262 | K.K. Balakrishnan | M | INC | 43024 | 9238 |
| 97 | Aroor | GEN | K.R.Gowri Amma | F | JPSS | 61972 | B.Vinod | M | CPI(M) | 45439 | 16533 |
| 98 | Sherthalai | GEN | A.K.Antony | M | INC | 56691 | C.K.Chandrappan | M | CPI | 48306 | 8385 |
| 99 | Mararikulam | GEN | P.J.Francis | M | INC | 68302 | V.S.Achuthanandan | M | CPI(M) | 66337 | 1965 |
| 100 | Alleppey | GEN | K.C.Venugopal | M | INC | 45104 | P.S. Somasekharan | M | CPI | 37568 | 7536 |
| 101 | Ambalapuzha | GEN | Suseela Gopalan | F | CPI(M) | 47968 | Devadath G.Purakkad | M | INC | 45710 | 2258 |
| 102 | Kuttanad | GEN | K.C.Joseph | M | KEC | 44532 | J.Joseph | M | INC | 40447 | 4085 |
| 103 | Haripad | GEN | A.V. Thamarakshan | M | RSP | 54055 | N.Mohan Kumar | M | INC | 46837 | 7218 |
| 104 | Kayamkulam | GEN | G.Sudhakaran | M | CPI(M) | 47776 | Thachadi Prabhakaran | M | INC | 45129 | 2647 |
| 105 | Thiruvalla | GEN | Mamman Mathai | M | KEC(M) | 39606 | Oommen Thalavady | M | JD | 33665 | 5941 |
| 106 | Kallooppara | GEN | T.S.John | M | KEC | 32112 | Joseph M.Puthusseri | M | KEC(M) | 31940 | 172 |
| 107 | Aranmula | GEN | Kadammanitta Ramakrishnan | M | IND | 34657 | M.V.Raghavan | M | CMPKSC | 31970 | 2687 |
| 108 | Chengannur | GEN | Sobhana George | F | INC | 37242 | Mammen Iype | M | ICS | 34140 | 3102 |
| 109 | Mavelikara | GEN | M.Murali | M | INC | 51784 | P.N. Viswanathan | M | CPI(M) | 42053 | 9731 |
| 110 | Pandalam | (SC) | P.K.Kumaran | M | CPI(M) | 50056 | Pandalam Bharathan | M | JPSS | 44896 | 5160 |
| 111 | Ranni | GEN | Raju Abraham | M | CPI(M) | 40932 | Peeilipose Thomas | M | INC | 37503 | 3429 |
| 112 | Pathanamthitta | GEN | K.K.Nair | M | INC | 40215 | D.K.John | M | KEC | 34408 | 5807 |
| 113 | Konni | GEN | Adoor Prakash | M | INC | 43474 | A.Padmakumar | M | CPI(M) | 42668 | 806 |
| 114 | Pathanapuram | GEN | K.Prakash Babu | M | CPI | 49023 | Thomas Kuthiravattam | M | KEC(B) | 44535 | 4488 |
| 115 | Punalur | GEN | P.K.Sreenivasan | M | CPI | 55382 | Punalur Madhu | M | INC | 48684 | 6698 |
| 116 | Chadayamangalam | GEN | R. Latha Devi | F | CPI | 42550 | Prayar Gopalakrishnan | M | INC | 39804 | 2746 |
| 117 | Kottarakkara | GEN | R.Balkrishna Pillai | M | KEC(B) | 47433 | George Mathew | M | CPI(M) | 44054 | 3379 |
| 118 | Neduvathur | (SC) | Ezhukone Narayanan | M | INC | 44940 | B.Raghavan | M | CPI(M) | 43976 | 964 |
| 119 | Adoor | GEN | Thiruvanchoor Radhakrishnan | M | INC | 47907 | K.N.Balagopal | M | CPI(M) | 38706 | 9201 |
| 120 | Kunnathur | (SC) | T. Nanoo | M | RSP | 51697 | Visalakshy | F | INC | 46934 | 4763 |
| 121 | Karunagappally | GEN | E. Chandrasekharan Nair | M | CPI | 49587 | Sathjith | M | JPSS | 33237 | 16350 |
| 122 | Chavara | GEN | Baby John | M | RSP | 53730 | K.Karunakaran Pillai | M | INC | 45655 | 8075 |
| 123 | Kundara | GEN | J. Mercykutty Amma | F | CPI(M) | 46322 | Alphonsa John | F | INC | 39846 | 6476 |
| 124 | Quilon | GEN | Babu Divakaran | M | RSP | 45383 | Kadavoor Sivadasan | M | INC | 39085 | 6298 |
| 125 | Eravipuram | GEN | V.P. Ramakrishna Pillai | M | RSP | 53344 | A.Yoonus Kunju | M | IUML | 48554 | 4790 |
| 126 | Chathanoor | GEN | P.Raveendran | M | CPI | 49083 | C.V.Padmarajan | M | INC | 46968 | 2115 |
| 127 | Varkala | GEN | A.Ali Hassan | M | CPI(M) | 42093 | G.Priyadarsanan | M | INC | 15704 | 26389 |
| 128 | Attingal | GEN | Anathalavattom Anandan | M | CPI(M) | 42161 | Vakkom Purushothaman | M | INC | 41145 | 1016 |
| 129 | Kilimanoor | (SC) | Bhargavi Thankappan | F | CPI | 49637 | M.Radhakrishnan | M | INC | 40832 | 8805 |
| 130 | Vamanapuram | GEN | Pirappancode Murali | M | CPI(M) | 48491 | C.K.Sitaram | M | JPSS | 42105 | 6386 |
| 131 | Ariyanad | GEN | G.Karthikeyan | M | INC | 45152 | K.P.Sankaradas | M | RSP | 36535 | 8617 |
| 132 | Nedumangad | GEN | Palode Ravi | M | INC | 57220 | M.Radhakrishnan | M | CPI | 52956 | 4264 |
| 133 | Kazhakuttam | GEN | K.Surendran | M | CPI(M) | 56425 | E.A.Rasheed | M | IND | 32368 | 24057 |
| 134 | Trivandrum North | GEN | M.Vijayakumar | M | CPI(M) | 62479 | T.Saratchandra Prasad | M | INC | 48170 | 14309 |
| 135 | Trivandrum West | GEN | Antony Raju | M | KEC | 38335 | M.M.Hassan | M | INC | 31441 | 6894 |
| 136 | Trivandrum East | GEN | B.Vijaya Kumar | M | INC | 32389 | K.Krishna Pillai | M | ICS | 29911 | 2478 |
| 137 | Nemom | GEN | Venganoor P. Bhaskaran | M | CPI(M) | 51139 | K.Mohankumar | M | INC | 47543 | 3596 |
| 138 | Kovalam | GEN | A. Neelalohithadasan N. | M | JD | 57180 | George Mascrene | M | INC | 35239 | 21941 |
| 139 | Neyyattinkara | GEN | Thampanoor Ravi | M | INC | 50924 | Charupara Ravi | M | JD | 36500 | 14424 |
| 140 | Parassala | GEN | N.Sundaran Nadar | M | IND | 36297 | W.R.Heeba | F | CPI(M) | 31570 | 4727 |

=== By-election ===
| S.No. | Constituency | Type | Year | Winning candidate | Party | Votes | Runner-up Candidate | Party | Votes | Winning party | Majority |
|---|---|---|---|---|---|---|---|---|---|---|---|
| 115 | Punalur | GEN | 1996 | P.S. Supal | CPI | 65401 | Bharathipuram Sasi | INC | 44068 | CPI | 21333 |
| 12 | Tellicherry | GEN | 1996 | E. K. Nayanar | CPM | 60841 | T. Asafali | INC | 36340 | CPM | 24501 |
| 126 | Chathanoor | GEN | 1998 | Adv. N. Anirudhan | CPI | 53471 | C. V. Padmarajan | INC | 49533 | CPI | 3938 |
| 72 | Ernakulam | GEN | 1998 | Adv. Sebastian Paul | CPM- IND | 48827 | Leno Jacob | INC | 44887 | CPM- IND | 3940 |
| 62 | Mala | GEN | 1998 | W. S. Sasi | CPI | 49211 | T.U.Radhakrishanan | INC | 48939 | CPI | 272 |
| 96 | Vaikom | SC | 1998 | P. Narayanan | CPI | 52433 | Adv. V. P. Sajeendran | INC | 51157 | CPI | 1276 |
