= N. D. Appachan =

Indian politician

Member of Kerala Legislative Assembly (MLA)
- In office 2001–2005
- Preceded by: P. V. Varghese Vaidyar
- Succeeded by: P. Krishna Prasad
- Constituency: Sulthan Bathery

Personal details
- Born: 2 May 1949 (age 77)
- Party: Indian National Congress
- Spouse: Thressia
- Children: 3

Nellinilkkumthadathil Devassia Appachan is an Indian National Congress politician from Kerala, India. He represented Sulthan Bathery Assembly constituency in the 11th Kerala Assembly.

== Biography ==
N. D. Appachan was born on May 2, 1949, to N. J. Devassia of the Nellinilkkumthadathil house and Annamma. He lives in Kakkavayal, Wayanad district. He and his wife Tressia have 3 children.

== Political career ==
Appachan, who was the first elected District Congress Committee (DCC) President of Wayanad District in 1991, served as the DCC President and Wayanad District UDF Chairman till 2004. In 2021 he was re-elected DCC President.

He was elected to the 11th Kerala Legislative Assembly in 2001. He represented Sulthan Bathery Assembly constituency as an Indian National Congress candidate. He resigned from the post on July 5, 2005.

== Controversies ==
In 2022, a complaint was filed against Appachan by a tribal woman who was Youth Congress Mananthavady Constituency secretary alleging that she was abused by him for her caste and gender. But the Adivasi Congress Mananthavady constituency committee said the allegations are baseless.
