= Sulthan Bathery Assembly constituency =

Constituency of the Kerala legislative assembly in India

Sulthan Bathery
- Constituency No. 18 for the Kerala Legislative Assembly
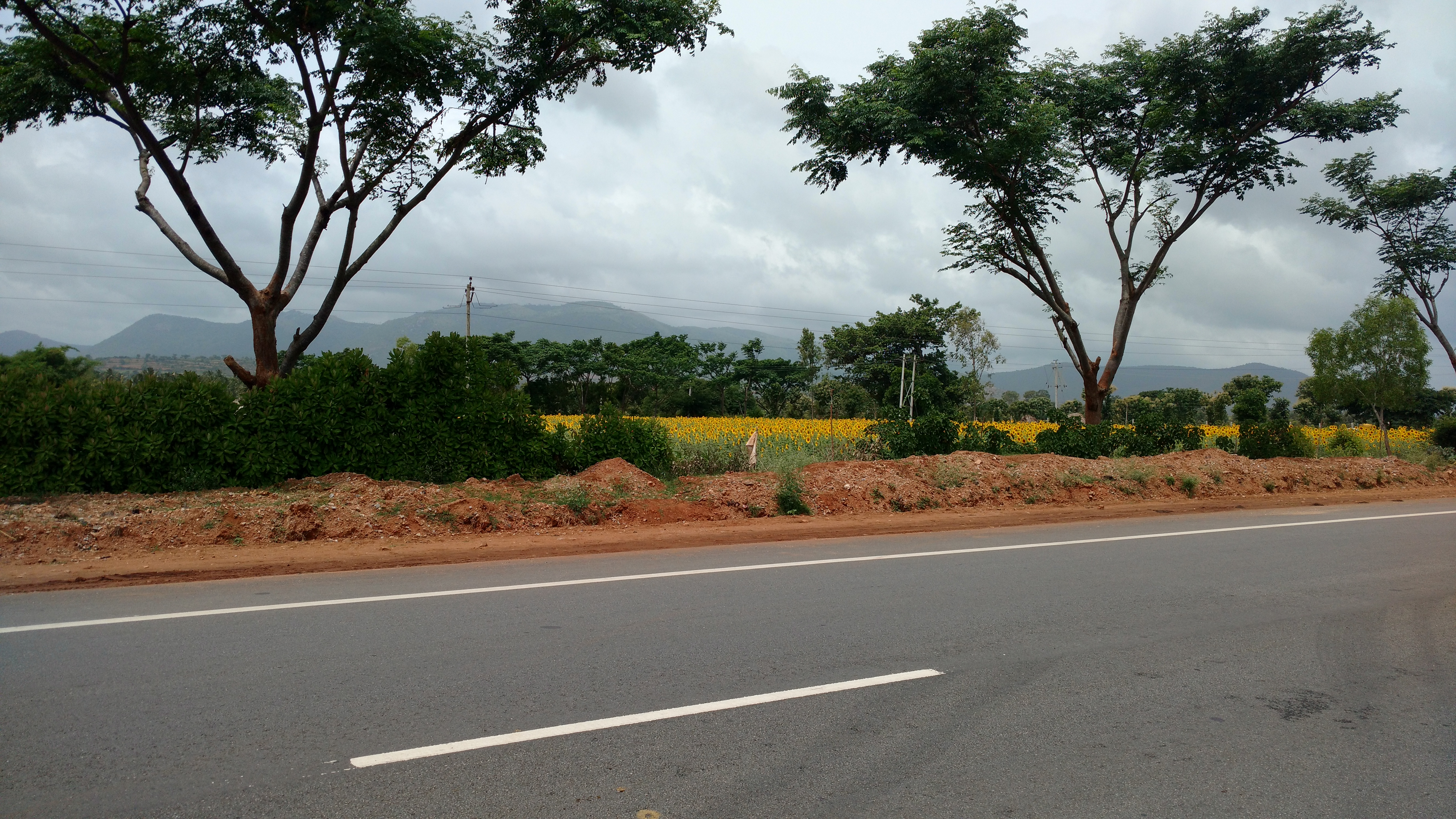
- NH 766 In Bathery Connecting Kozhikode To Mysore

Constituency details
- Country: India
- Region: South India
- State: Kerala
- District: Wayanad
- Lok Sabha constituency: Wayanad
- Established: 1977
- Total electors: 2,20,167 (2021)
- Reservation: ST

Member of Legislative Assembly
- 16th Kerala Legislative Assembly
- Incumbent I. C. Balakrishnan
- Party: INC
- Alliance: UDF
- Elected year: 2026

Sulthan Bathery State assembly constituency is one of the 140 state legislative assembly constituencies in Kerala in southern India. It is also one of the seven state legislative assembly constituencies included in Wayanad Lok Sabha constituency. As of the 2026 Assembly elections, the current MLA is I. C. Balakrishnan of INC who is the longest serving MLA of the constituency.

== Local self-governed segments ==
Sulthan Bathery Assembly constituency is composed of the following local self-governed segments:

Sl no.	Name	Status (Grama panchayat/Municipality)	Taluk
1	Sulthan Bathery	Municipality	Sulthan Bathery
2	Ambalavayal	Grama panchayat	Sulthan Bathery
3	Meenangadi	Grama panchayat	Sulthan Bathery
4	Mullenkolly	Grama panchayat	Sulthan Bathery
5	Nenmeni	Grama panchayat	Sulthan Bathery
6	Noolpuzha	Grama panchayat	Sulthan Bathery
7	Poothadi	Grama panchayat	Sulthan Bathery
8	Pulpally	Grama panchayat	Sulthan Bathery

== Members of the Legislative Assembly ==
Election	Niyama Sabha	Name	Party	Tenure
1977	5th	K Raghavan	Indian National Congress	1977 – 1980
1980	6th	K. K. Ramachandran	Indian National Congress	1980 – 1982
1982	7th	K. K. Ramachandran	Indian National Congress	1982 – 1987
1987	8th	K. K. Ramachandran	Indian National Congress	1987 – 1991
1991	9th	K. C. Rosakutty	Indian National Congress	1991 – 1996
1996	10th	P. V. Varghese Vaidyar	Communist Party of India	1996 – 2001
2001	11th	N. D. Appachan	Indian National Congress	2001 – 2006
2006	12th	P. Krishna Prasad	Communist Party of India	2006 – 2011
2011	13th	I. C. Balakrishnan	Indian National Congress	2011 – 2016
2016	14th	I. C. Balakrishnan	Indian National Congress	2016 - 2021
2021	15th	I. C. Balakrishnan	Indian National Congress	2021 - 2026
2026	16th	I. C. Balakrishnan	Indian National Congress	2026 - 2031

== Election results ==
=== 2026 ===
2026 Kerala Legislative Assembly election: Sulthan Bathery
Party	Candidate	Votes	%	±%
INC	I. C. Balakrishnan	78,936	44.61	▼3.81
CPI(M)	M. S. Viswanathan	62,339	35.23	▼6.13
BJP	Kavitha A. S.	31,308	17.69	▲8.61
AAP	N. V. Prakrithi	1,781	1.01	New
NOTA	None of the above	1,442	0.81	▲0.11
BSP	Benadict	447	0.25	
SUCI(C)	V. A. Ramesan	275	0.16	
Independent	Balakrishnan Edakkal	212	0.12	
Independent	Rajesh R. M.	198	0.11	
Margin of victory		16,597	9.38	▲2.32
Turnout		1,76,938		
INC hold		Swing	▼3.81	

=== 2021 ===
There were 2,20,167 registered voters in the constituency for the 2016 election.

2021 Kerala Legislative Assembly election: Sulthan Bathery
Party	Candidate	Votes	%	±%
INC	I. C. Balakrishnan	81,077	48.42	▲4.38
CPI(M)	M. S. Viswanathan	69,255	41.36	▲3.83
JRS	C. K. Janu	15,198	9.08	▼7.15
NOTA	None of the above	1,160	0.70	▼0.03
Independent	Ondan Paniyan	742	0.44	
Margin of victory		11,822	7.06	▲0.55
Turnout		1,67,432	76.05	▼2.76
INC hold		Swing	▲4.38	

=== 2016 ===
There were 2,18,241 registered voters in the constituency for the 2016 election.

2016 Kerala Legislative Assembly election: Sulthan Bathery
Party	Candidate	Votes	%	±%
INC	I. C. Balakrishnan	75,747	44.04	▼5.10
CPI(M)	Rugmini Subrahmanian	64,549	37.53	▼6.40
JRS	C. K. Janu	27,920	16.23	▲10.16
NOTA	None of the above	1,261	0.73	−
BSP	Mukundan Cheengeri	791	0.46	▼0.01
CPI(ML)L	Madhavi	609	0.35	−
SP	K. K. Vasu	478	0.28	−
Independent	Balakrishnan Edakkal	387	0.22	−
SUCI(C)	T. R. Sreedharan	262	0.15	−
Margin of victory		11,198	6.51	▲3.75
Turnout		1,72,004	78.81	▲5.56
INC hold		Swing	▼5.10	

=== 2011 ===
There were 1,98,645 registered voters in the constituency for the 2011 election.

2011 Kerala Legislative Assembly election: Sulthan Bathery
Party	Candidate	Votes	%	±%
INC	I. C. Balakrishnan	71,540	49.14	
CPI(M)	E. A. Sankaran	63,926	43.93	
BJP	Palliyara Raman	8,829	6.07	
BSP	Mukundan Cheengeri	679	0.47	
Margin of victory		7,583	10.26	
Turnout		1,45,512	73.25	
INC gain from CPI(M)		Swing		

Year	Niyama Sabha	Category	Winning Candidate	Winning Party	Vote	Runner-up	Party	Vote	Majority
1977	5th	ST	K. Raghavan Master	INC	29204	Nidyachery Vasu	BLD	24213	4991
1980	6th	GEN	K. K. Ramachandran Master	INC(I)	36974	P. T. Jose	KEC	29580	7394
1982	7th	GEN	K. K. Ramachandran Master	INC(I)	31858	P. V. Varghese Vaidyar	CPI(M)	28623	3235
1987	8th	GEN	K. K. Ramachandran Master	INC	39102	P. Cyriac John	ICS(SCS)	34976	4126
1991	9th	GEN	K. C. Rosakutty	INC	53050	P.V Varghese Vaidyar	CPM	50544	2006
1996	10th	GEN	P. V. Varghese Vaidyar	CPI(M)	50316	K. C. Rosakutty	INC	49020	1296
2001	11th	GEN	N. D. Appachan	INC	68685	Fr. Mathai Nooranal	IND	45132	23553
2006	12th	GEN	P. Krishna Prasad	CPI(M)	63092	N D Appachan	DIC	37552	25540
2011	13th	ST	I. C. Balakrishnan	INC	71509	E. A. Shankaran	CPI(M)	63926	7583
2016	14th	ST	I. C. Balakrishnan	INC	75747	Rugmini Subramanian	CPI(M)	65647	11198

== See also ==
- Sulthan Bathery
- Wayanad district
- List of constituencies of the Kerala Legislative Assembly
- 2016 Kerala Legislative Assembly election
