= P. Cyriac John =

Indian politician (1933–2023)

P. Cyriac John (11 June 1933 – 30 November 2023) was an Indian politician.

== Early life ==
P. Cyriac John was born in Marangattupilly on 11 June 1933 to parents Kadaplamattom John and Mariyamma. In 1950, his family moved to Kattippara.

== Political career ==
Cyriac was first elected to the Kerala Legislative Assembly in 1970, representing Kalpetta and the Indian National Congress (Requisitionists). He was reelected from Thiruvambady in 1977, 1980, and 1982, while affiliated with the Indian National Congress. During his fourth consecutive term in office, Cyriac served as the first agriculture minister of the Third Karunakaran ministry, from 24 May 1982 to 31 August 1983. Cyriac sought reelection from the Sulthan Bathery Assembly constituency in 1987, losing to K. K. Ramachandran Master. Cyriac then returned to Thiruvambady, and lost the 1991, 1996, and 2001 Kerala legislative elections. Cyriac left Congress to serve three years as president of the Nationalist Congress Party branch in Kerala, then returned to Congress in 2007.

== Personal life and death ==
Cyriac was married to Annakutty, with whom he had children P. C. Babu, P. C. Bina, P. C. Mini, Manoj Cyriac, and Vinod Cyriac. He died in palliative care at Kozhikode on 30 November 2023. His funeral was held at Holy Family Church in Kattippara.
