= Sultan Bathery Municipality =

Local civic body in Wayanad, Kerala, India

History
- Founded: 2015

Leadership
- Chairperson: Raseena Abdul Khader, IUML
- Deputy Chairperson: Indrajith M.G, INC

Structure
- Political groups: UDF (20): INC (10); IUML (8); KEC (1); Independent (1); LDF (15): CPI(M) (13); KC(M) (1); Independent (1); National Democratic Alliance (1): BJP (1)

Website
- sulthanbatherymunicipality.lsgkerala.gov.in/en

Sultan Bathery Municipality is the Municipality that administers the city of Sultan Bathery in Wayanad district, Kerala. Established in 2015, it is in the Wayanad Lok Sabha constituency and Sulthan Bathery Assembly constituency.

== Municipality Wards and Members ==
Sultan Bathery Municipality is divided into 36 wards for ease of administration from which a member is elected from each for a duration of five years.

Governing Council
Position	Name	Alliance	Division
Chairperson	Raseena Abdul Khader	UDF	C Kunnu
Deputy Chairperson	Indrajith M.G	UDF	Cheroorkunnu

(Note: The image provides election results for individual wards but does not explicitly name the Chairperson/Deputy Chairperson. Since UDF won 20 seats, they hold the majority to elect these positions.)

Councillors
Ward	Division Name	Member	Party
001	Aram Mile	Anjali Teacher	CPI(M)
002	Chethalayam	Sherina Abdulla	IUML
003	Chenadu	C. K. Sathyaraj	CPI(M)
004	Vengur North	K. K. Moithu	IUML
005	Odappallam	Priya Vinod	CPI(M)
006	Vengur South	Samshad P.	INC
007	Pazheri	Vinod C.	INC
008	Karuvallikunnu	Preetha Ravi	INC
009	Armadu	Vincy Baiju	OTH
010	Kottakunnu	Lisha Teacher	CPI(M)
011	Kidangil	C. M. Anil	CPI(M)
012	Kuppadi	Supriya Anilkumar	CPI(M)
013	Thirunelli	Tom Jose	KC(M)
014	Manthandikunnu	Radha Raveendran	INC
015	Sathramkunnu	Abdul Gafoor U. P.	CPI(M)
016	Cheroorkunnu	Indrajith M. G.	INC
017	Palakkara	Pramod Palakkara	INC
018	Thelambatta	V. M. Yunus Ali	INC
019	Thoduvelty	Radha Mahadevan	INC
020	Kaipancheri	Shifanath V. K.	IUML
021	Mythanikunnu	Shabarban (Banu Pulikkal)	IUML
022	Fairland	Radha Babu	IUML
023	C Kunnu	Raseena Abdul Khader	IUML
024	Kattayad	Nisha Sabu	INC
025	Sulthan Bathery	Sulabi Moses	KEC
026	Pallikandi	Balkees Shoukathali	IUML
027	Manichira	Fauziya Teacher	IUML
028	Kalluvayal	Leela Paalpath	INC
029	Poomala	M. S. Vishwanathan	CPI(M)
030	Dhottappankulam	A. P. Prashinth	CPI(M)
031	Beenachi	K. C. Yohannan	CPI(M)
032	Poothikkad	Bindhu Pramod	CPI(M)
033	Cheenapullu	Noushad Mangalassery	OTH
034	Manthamkolli	Sherly Krishnan	CPI(M)
035	Pazhuppathoor	Jayesh J. P.	BJP
036	Kaivattamoola	Hyrunnisa Riyas	CPI(M)
