= Lal Salam (1990 film) =

- VCD cover poster
- Directed by: Venu Nagavalli
- Screenplay by: Venu Nagavalli
- Story by: cheriyan kalpakavadi
- Produced by: K. R. G.
- Starring: Mohanlal; Urvashi; Murali; Geetha; Jagathy Srikumar; Nedumudi Venu; Madhu; Zainuddin; Lalu Alex; Sukumari; Vineeth; Ashokan; Vijayaraghavan
- Cinematography: K. P. Nambiathiri
- Edited by: N. Gopalakrishnan
- Music by: Score: C.Rajamani; Songs; Raveendran
- Distributed by: K. R. G. Release
- Release date: 21 December 1990
- Running time: 147 minutes
- Country: India
- Language: Malayalam

Lal Salam is a 1990 Indian Malayalam-language political drama film directed by Venu Nagavalli and produced under the banner K. R. G. Release. It stars Mohanlal, Murali, Geetha, and Urvashi. This movie was a blockbuster, running in seven centres for more than 150 days.

The story revolves around two phases of the lives of three comrades - before and after the imprisonment of Sakhavu Stephen Nettooran (Mohanlal- inspired from Varghese Vaidyan), Sakhavu D.K. Antony (Murali- inspired from T. V. Thomas) and Sakhavu Sethulakshmi (Geetha- inspired from K. R. Gowri Amma) - members of the Communist Party of India (CPI).

== Plot ==
The plot revolves around the early days of the Communist Party in Kerala. Three Comrades, Stephen Nettoor, D.K. Antony and Sethulakshmi work tirelessly to empower the daily wage labourers and other proletarians of their village, to end the reign of feudal landlords, in the days when Communism was illegal to practice. Sethu and Antony are in love with each other, as are Nettooran and Annamma, the daughter of Medayil Ittichan, the landlord whose press Nettooran runs, as his day job.

During a farmers' uprising, a landlord is killed and the blame is assigned on the three leaders of the party. The three go into hiding, while various atrocities are committed by the State Police under the pretence of trying to find them. Sethulakshmi is arrested. Grieved by these events, Nettooran and D.K. surrender. The three are convicted and sent to jail.

Upon their release, Sethu, D.K. and Nettooran are welcomed as heroes by the Party cadre. During their imprisonment, the Party has grown popular and has become a substantial political power. With the election for the State Legislative Assembly looming, Sethu and D.K are unanimously chosen as Party candidates, supported by Nettooran and other Party members. The party wins the State elections through a landslide victory and Sethu is chosen Home minister and D.K. finance minister.

Meanwhile, a pregnant Annamma is hospitalized with a pregnancy related complication. Nettooran, having devoted his time and energy for the party, is unable to purchase medication for Annamma. A desperate Nettooran goes to Father Felix, a central figure in the community. Father Felix lends him ₹50 and Nettooran pays for Annamma's medication. Shaken by the realization that he is financially incapable of leading his family, Nettooran goes to his friend Unnithan for advice. Unnithan advises him to set up a business. Fazed by the conflict of his principle ideology, and his living situation, Nettooran goes to Potty, who advises him to take a sabbatical from the party for a few years, in order to set up his business. After taking a leave for five years and resigning from the present state committee membership from the party, Nettooran starts contract works business. Through his tireless work and dedication he becomes a wealthy businessman.

Meanwhile, D.K. and Sethulakshmi who are still ministers have a conflict in their family life. The illicit relationship that D.K. had with Stella is exposed to Sethulakshmi and she protests. The film ends with D.K.'s death, and Nettooran saluting his grave.

== Cast ==
- Mohanlal as Nettoor Stephen (Nettooran): Mohanlal plays the title character of Nettooran, a Communist Party activist turned wealthy industrialist. Nettooran marries Annakkutti, who is the only daughter Medayil Ittichan, an elite Christian landlord.
- Murali as D.K. Antony: Murali portrays Sakhavu (Comrade) D.K. Antony, Nettooran's close friend and confidante, who is the son of a lawyer, but becomes a Communist Party activist alongside Nettooran and Sethulakshmi. He later becomes the industries minister in the state legislative assembly, in the first elected Communist government. He is married to Sethulakshmi, but has a child in his one-night relationship with Stella. Mammootty was initially considered for the role.
- Geetha as Sethulakshmi: Geetha plays Sakhavu Sethulakshmi, an early day party activist, who, along with Nettooran and D.K, formed the most powerful trinity among party activists. She falls in love with and marries D.K., and later becomes the Home Minister of the State.
- Urvashi as Annakkutty: Annakkutty is Nettooran's wife. She elopes with Nettooran from her well off family against their wish.
- Rekha as Stella: Stella is tragic character, who has an illegitimate child from her brief relationship with Sakhavu D.K.
- Madhu as Medayil Ittichan: Veteran actor Madhu portrays Ittichan, a rich landlord, under whom Nettooran was employed, running his press. Ittichan disowns his daughter Annakkutty, evidently not wholeheartedly, when she elopes with Nettooran.
- Jagathy Sreekumar as Unnithan: Unnithan is a trusty assistant to Nettooran, and was a Party activist along with Nettooran and D.K. in the early days.
- Nedumudi Venu as Father Felix: Father Felix is the priest in charge of the congregation to which the Medayil family belongs to. He marries Annakkutty and Nettooran, ignoring protests from his flock.
- Karamana Janardanan Nair as Janardanan Potty: Potty is a senior Party leader, who goes on to become the Chief Minister of the first Communist government of Kerala.
- Lalu Alex as Medayil Avaran Kutty: Avaran Kutty is Annakkutty's short tempered older brother, who despises Nettooran, whose relationship with his sister he opposed vehemently.
- Janardhanan as Kannan Muthalali: Kannan Muthalali is a shrewd businessman who pretends to be a well-wisher of the Party, expecting business returns.
- Vineeth as Medayil Josekutty
- Vijayaraghavan as Medayil Kariyakutty
- Thikkurissy Sukumaran Nair as Thirumulpad
- Zainuddin as Ayyappan Thampi
- Ashokan as Madhavan, a minor antagonist who dislikes Nettooran
- K. P. A. C. Sunny
- Sukumari as Chettathi
- Kuthiravattam Pappu as Noor
- Rajan P. Dev as Idiyan Karthavu
- Nimmi Paul

== Music ==
The film's score was composed by C. Rajamani while the 4 songs featured in the film were composed by Raveendran with Lyrics by O. N. V. Kurup.

#	Title	Singer(s)
1	"Aadi Druthapada Thaalam"	K. J. Yesudas
2	"Aaro Porunnen Koode"	M. G. Sreekumar, Sujatha Mohan, Raveendran
3	"Lalsalam"	K. J. Yesudas
4	"Saandramaam Mounathin"	K. J. Yesudas

== Prequel ==
Rakthasakshikal Sindabad (1998) is a prequel to this film.
