= P. Krishna Prasad =

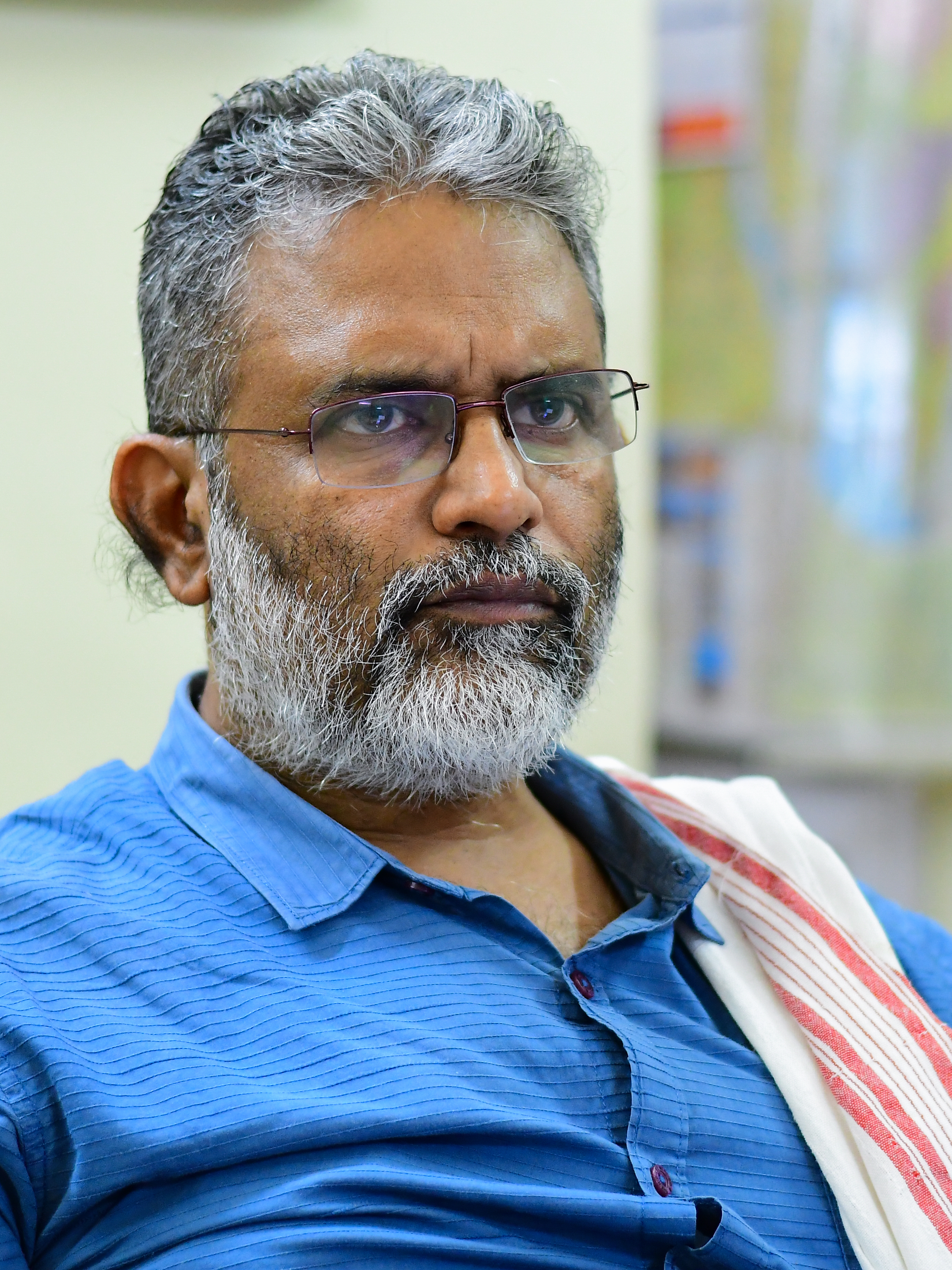
- Leader: Former MLA, Finance Secretary of All India Kisan Sabha (36 Canning Lane)
- Constituency: Sulthan Bathery (State Assembly constituency)

Personal details
- Born: 25 May 1967 (age 59)
- Party: Communist Party of India (Marxist)
- Education: St. Joseph's College, Devagiri, Kozhikode

P. Krishna Prasad is the finance secretary of All India Kisan Sabha (36 Canning Lane) and the former CPI(M) MLA from Sulthan Bathery. He is also the chairman of Brahmagiri Development Society, a worker – peasant cooperative in Kerala.

== Life ==
P. Krishna Prasad was born on 25 May 1967 to Kuttikrishnan Nair and Devakiamma in Sulthan Bathery. He did his bachelor's degree from St. Joseph's College, Devagiri. His wife A. R. Sindu is a prominent political activist. She is the General Secretary of the All India Federation of Anganwadi Workers and Helpers. She is one among the 15 women in the Central Committee of Communist Party of India (Marxist).

== Political career ==
=== Student politics ===
P. Krishna Prasad entered politics through Students' Federation of India. He became the Calicut University Union Chairman in 1987–88. He was later elected as the All India President of Student' Federation of India in 2000 at Chennai Conference.

=== Electoral politics ===
In 2006, P. Krishna Prasad defeated N. D. Appachan, the sitting MLA of Sulthan Bathery and won by a margin of 25,540 votes. He therefore became the only CPI(M) leader to get elected after P. V. Varghese Vaidyar. As per the political history of Sulthan Bathery, except for 1996–2001 and 2006–11, the tenure of P.V. Varghese Vaidyar and P. Krishna Prasad respectively, Bathery constituency remains a confident hold of Indian National Congress.

No.	Year	Constituency	Winner	Votes	Political Party	Runner-up	Votes	Political Party	Margin
1	2006–2011	Sulthan Bathery (State Assembly constituency)	P Krishna Prasad	63092	CPI(M)	N D Appachan	37552	Democratic Indira Congress	25540

=== Peasant leader ===
P. Krishna Prasad is associated with All India Kisan Sabha (36 Canning Lane) and Bhumi Adhikar Andolan (BAA). He came out strongly against the violence of cow vigilante groups and argued that their actions badly affected the livelihood of small and marginal farmers. After visiting the body of Gajendra Singh, a distressed Rajasthani farmer who committed suicide in front of Arvind Kejriwal (Delhi Chief Minister), Prasad and his organisation demanded Rs 10 lakh compensation for farmer's family in 2015. He was part of the two-day colloquium on "Corporate Concentration in Agriculture and Food", organized by Rosa Luxemburg Stiftung, Focus on Global South and Alternative Law Forum. He is a proponent of value addition in agrarian sector to combat the crisis faced by farmers, so that farmers get better price for their labour. He blames Congress party for the high rates of farmers' suicide in Wayanad during their rule. He was one of the major organisers of Kisan-Mazdoor Sangharsh rally which culminated at Ramlila Maidan, New Delhi on 5 September 2018.

== Cooperative movement ==
P. Krishna Prasad is one of the major proponents of the cooperative movement in India. He is the chairman of the Wayanad-based Brahmagiri Development Society (BDS), a cooperative aiming to combat the agrarian crisis in Kerala by organising solidarity economy among peasants and workers. BDS is a social cooperative of more than 13,000 farmers. In agriculture, meat production and dairy, the BDS has enhanced significant self-sufficiency. The brain behind Brahmagiri Development Society (BDS) is P.V. Varghese Vaidyar, the former CPI(M) MLA from Sulthan Bathery. Both in the electoral politics and cooperative movement Krishna Prasad is true successor to Varghese Vaidyar.

In 2010, Krishna Prasad initiated a ten day long agricultural expo by organizing cooperatives. He was one of the important organizers of the National Workshop for Agrarian Crisis and Alternative Policies which was held on 11 and 12 July 2019 in Hyderabad. The workshop explored the potential for Cooperatives in the battle against agrarian crisis. His study along with Jose George on "Agrarian Distress and Farmers' Suicides in the Tribal District of Wayanad" has set a pathway to understand the Agrarian society of rural Wayanad. Under his leadership BDS has recently launched comprehensive projects to help out Coffee Farmers in distress. The branding of Wayanad Coffee was part of this initiative.
