= K. K. Ramachandran Master =

Indian politician (1936–2021)

K K Ramachandran Master
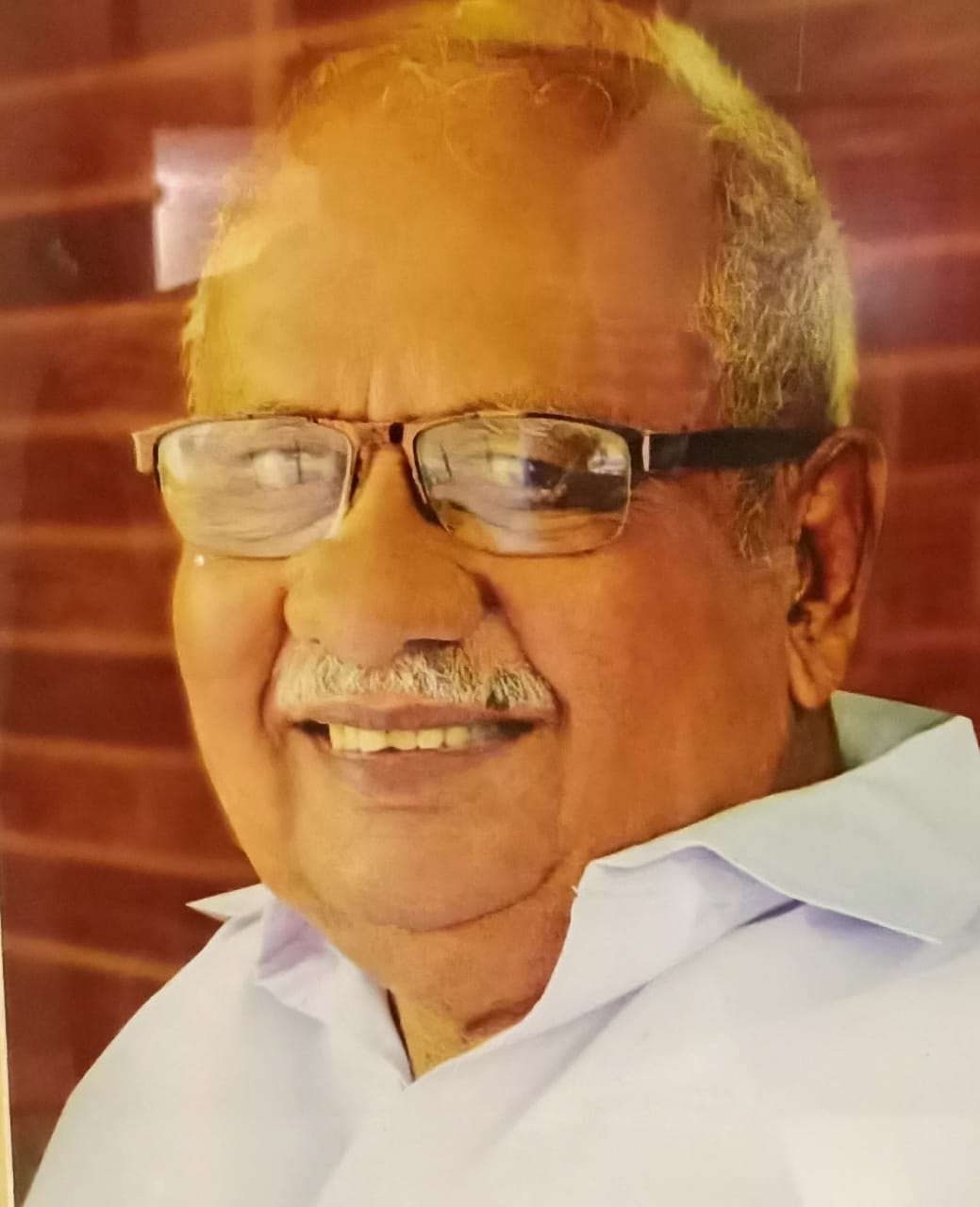

Minister For Health
- In office 2004–2006
- Preceded by: P. Sankaran
- Succeeded by: A Sujanapal

Minister For Food And Civil Supplies
- In office 1995–1996
- Preceded by: T. H. Musthafa
- Succeeded by: E. Chandrasekharan Nair

Personal details
- Born: 11 December 1936
- Died: 7 January 2021 (aged 84) Kakkodi, Kozhikode
- Party: Indian National Congress

Kannankkot Kottarathil Ramachandran Master, better known as K. K. Ramachandran Master (11 December 1936 – 7 January 2021), was an Indian politician. He served as general secretary K.P.C.C, Member of Kerala Legislative Assembly, Minister for Food and Civil Supplies, and Minister for Health. He was a member of the 6th, 7th, and 8th Niyamasabha representing Sulthan Bathery and the 9th, 10th, and 11th Niyamasabha representing Kalpetta.

He played a crucial role in nurturing and strengthening the Indian National Congress among plantation labourers in Malabar.

== Early life ==
Ramachandran Master was born on 11 December 1936, in Nidumbram Village near Chokli, in Kannur District. His parents were Shri. Pukkottuparambil Narayanan Nambiar and Smt. Kannankkott Kottarathil Rugmini Amma. He had two younger brothers and five younger sisters. His mother died when he was fourteen.

Ramachandran attended Kuttipuram ALP School. Later, he studied in the Ramakrishna L P School, M M High School in New Mahe, and Thalassery Brennan College. In 1958, he completed his teacher's training course in Kannur Secondary Training School.

== Career ==
He started working as a teacher in V P Oriental High School in 1954 and then moved to Wayanad in 1962 to continue teaching at Arimula AUP School.

While working as a teacher in V P Oriental High School, he was an active member of the Indian Youth Congress and was elected secretary of Youth Congress Committee in Nidumbram in 1954. After shifting to Wayanad, Ramachandran continued to be active in the Indian Youth Congress. Ramachandran resigned from his job as a teacher in 1976 and entered into full-time politics.

=== Politics ===
Ramachandran started his political career through the Indian Youth Congress (IYC). He organised many movements against Estate owners for the rights of plantation labourers in Malabar. He later created a party among plantation labourers known as the Plantation Labour Congress (PLC). While fighting for their rights in Elimbileri Estate in 1977, he was shot at by the estate owner, Marapandiyan. He missed and a labourer Manikyam was killed. This incident drew lot of attention in the media. Ramachandran later said it was a planned attack by the estate owners in Wayanad.

He was elected to Kerala Legislative Assembly for the first time in 1980 from Sulthan Bathery Constituency. He won again in 1980, 1982, 1987 in Sulthan Bathery and in 1991, 1996, 2001 from Kalpetta Constituency.

He also served as the Minister for Food and Civil Supplies in second A K Antony Ministry and Minister for Health in first Oomen Chandy Ministry.

==== Highlights ====
- Member, Indian Coffee Board;
- President, Water Authority Employees Association
- President, CWDRM Employees Association
- President, Kerala State Retail Ration Dealers Association
- Secretary, Youth Congress Committee, Nidumbram
- 1982–1987 Secretary, Congress Legislature Party
- 1969–1974 Secretary, DCC Kozhikode
- 1978 Vice President, State INTUC
- 1984 General Secretary, K.P.C.C.
- 1980 President, Kozhikode DCC
- 1980–1982 Member of 6th Kerala Legislative Assembly (1st Term)
- 1982–1987 Member of 7th Kerala Legislative Assembly (2nd Term)
- 1987–1991 Member of 7th Kerala Legislative Assembly (3rd Term)
- 1991–1996 Member of 8th Kerala Legislative Assembly (3rd Term)
- 1995–1996 Minister for Food and Civil Supplies
- 1996–2001 Member of 9th Kerala Legislative Assembly (4th Term)
- 2001–2006 Member of 10th Kerala Legislative Assembly (5th Term)
- 2004–2006 Minister for Health

== Legacy ==
Ramachandran died on 7 January 2021, due to cardiac arrest. He was cremated with full state honours at his son's residence in Kakkodi, Kozhikode.

Ramachandran Master wrote an autobiography titled Ningal Enne Communist Aaki Ningal Enne BJP Aaki published by Poorna Publication in 2017.

He married Smt. Padmini Amma in 1961 and had three sons.
