= K. C. Rosakutty =

Indian politician

K C Rosakutty

5th Chairperson Kerala Women's Commission
- In office 2012–2017
- Preceded by: D. Sreedevi
- Succeeded by: M. C. Josephine

Vice President Kerala Pradesh Congress Committee
- In office 2020–2021

General Secretary Kerala Pradesh Congress Committee
- In office 2000–2012

Member of Kerala Legislative Assembly
- In office 1991–1996
- Preceded by: K K Ramachandran
- Succeeded by: P. V. Varghese Vaidyar
- Constituency: Sulthan Bathery

Personal details
- Party: Indian National Congress, Communist Party of India (Marxist)
- Occupation: Politician

K C Rosakutty is an Indian politician and an attorney who was the 5th Chairperson of Women's Commission of Kerala. She was Vice President of Kerala Pradesh Congress Committee. She was a member of the legislative assembly from Sulthan Bathery. She left Indian National Congress on March 22, 2021, and joined Communist Party of India (Marxist).
