= I. C. Balakrishnan =

Indian politician

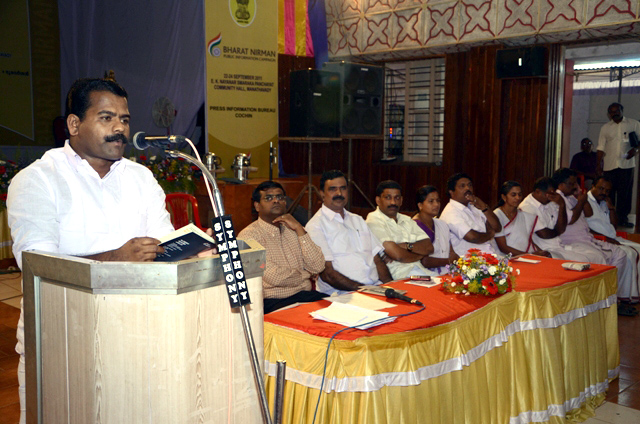
- I.C. Balakrishnan

Member of the Kerala Legislative Assembly
- Incumbent
- Assumed office 1 June 2011
- Constituency: Sulthan Bathery, Wayanad

Personal details
- Born: 25 May 1975 (age 51) Valad, Wayanad
- Party: Indian National Congress
- Spouse: Lakshmi
- Children: Three daughters

Illathumoola Chandu Balakrishnan is a member of 13th Kerala Legislative Assembly. He was elected from Sulthan Bathery constituency, representing Indian National Congress party.

He is the longest-serving MLA for Sulthan Bathery, having held the seat continuously since 2011.

== Political life ==
He started his political life as a leader of KSU, while studying in GHSS Valad. He was the member of Thavinjal Grama Panchayat and Wayanad district Panchayat. He was the District President of Indian Youth Congress Wayanad. Now, he is the district president of Youth Congress, Wayanad.

He contested the 2016 election against CPIM candidate E.A. Sankaran and won the seat with a margin of 7,583 votes.

== Personal life ==
He was born in 1975 at Valad as the son of Chandu and Meenakshi. He is married to Lakshmi and has three daughters. He was born in a middle class Illathumoola family.

== Controversies ==
=== Suicide abetment case ===
In January 2025, I. C. Balakrishnan was named as an accused in a case related to the alleged abetment of suicide of Wayanad DCC treasurer N. M. Vijayan and his son, Jijesh. He was arrested on 25 January 2025 and later released on bail after obtaining anticipatory bail.

=== Vigilance case ===
In October 2025, the Vigilance and Anti-Corruption Bureau registered a case against Balakrishnan over alleged corruption linked to cooperative bank appointments in Wayanad, in connection with the same case."VACB registers case against MLA I C Balakrishnan". The Times of India. 19 October 2025.
