= P. V. Varghese Vaidyar =

Indian politician

Member of Kerala Legislative Assembly (MLA)
- In office 1996–2001
- Preceded by: K. C. Rosakutty
- Succeeded by: N. D. Appachan
- Constituency: Sulthan Bathery

Personal details
- Born: 9 November 1922 Travancore, British India
- Died: 16 September 2012 (aged 89) Kalpetta, Wayanad district, Kerala
- Party: Communist Party of India (Marxist)
- Spouse: Saramma Varghese
- Children: 3

Panackal Varkey Varghese Vaidyar was a Communist Party of India (Marxist) politician from Kerala, India. He represented Sulthan Bathery Assembly constituency in 10th Kerala Legislative Assembly.

== Biography ==
Varghese Vaidyar was born on 9 November 1922 in Kunnakkalkara village in the Muvattupuzha Taluk to Annamma and P. V. Varkey of the Panackal house. Vaidyar's family migrated to Wayanad in 1952.

=== Personal life and death ===
Varghese Vaidyar and his wife Saramma Varghese of the Marottikal family in Muvattupuzha have three children. He died due to cardiac arrest, at a private hospital in Kalpetta on September 16, 2012. His body was buried with state honors at the St. Peter's Jacobite Syrian Orthodox Cathedral at Meenangadi.

== Political career ==
Varghese Vaidyar, who was an active member of Indian independence movement, participated in the Quit India Movement in 1942. He was a member of Indian National Congress party till 1949. He has been active in the field of public works since the formation of the Wayanad Taluk Revenue Land Owners' Association. Vaidyar later joined the Communist Party of India and the Kerala Karshaka Sangam (Peasants' Union) at the behest of A. K. Gopalan. After the split of Communist Party of India in 1964, Vaidyar became member of Communist Party of India (Marxist). He became prominent in the CPI (M) in the 1970s, leading a series of land struggles in the district, involving agricultural workers and small farmers. In 1970, Vaidyar was imprisoned along with A. K. Gopalan for participating in the Mudavanmukh agitation for the distribution of surplus land.

Vaidyar contested the 1982 and 1991 Kerala assembly elections but lost. He was elected to the 10th Kerala Legislative Assembly in 1996. He represented Sulthan Bathery Assembly constituency as a CPI (M) candidate. He had also served as Meenangadi panchayat president for two terms (10 years). Vaidyar also held several other positions including director of Wayanad District Co-operative Bank, member of the State Housing Board and the North Wayanad Land Board, district secretary and district president of Kerala State Karshaka Thozhilali Union. He was also the founding chairman of the Brahmagiri Development Society.

== Legacy ==
His biography Varghese Vaidyante Athmakatha (ISBN 9788126453337) was published in 2015 by DC Books. The first 4 chapters were written by Varghese himself but could not be completed because of his death, rest has been completed by his son Cherian Kalpakavadi. His life is depicted by Mohanlal in the Malayalam movie Lal Salaam(1990).
