= Sultan Bathery =

Town in Kerala, India

Sulthan Bathery
- Municipal town
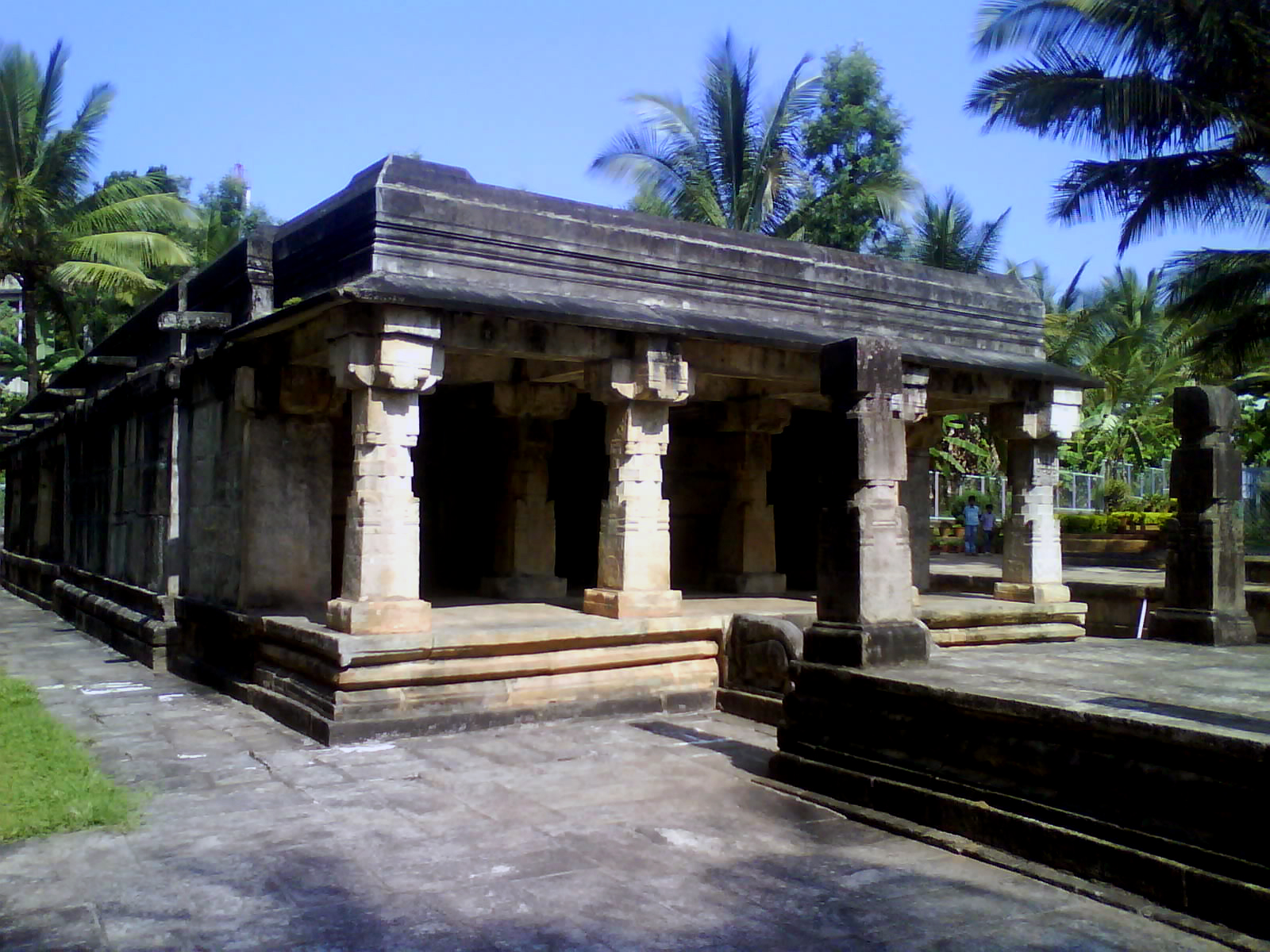

- Location in Kerala, India Sulthan Bathery (India)
- Coordinates: 11°39′46.453″N 76°15′25.279″E
- Country: India
- State: Kerala
- District: Wayanad
- Named for: artillery battery of Tipu Sultan

Government
  - Municipal Chairperson: Raseena Abdulkhadar

Area
  - Total: 103 km^{2} (40 sq mi)
- Elevation: 901 m (2,956 ft)

Population (2011)
  - Total: 45,417
  - Density: 441/km^{2} (1,140/sq mi)

Languages
  - Official: Malayalam, English
- Time zone: UTC+5:30 (IST)
- PIN: 673592
- Area code: 91 4936
- ISO 3166 code: IN-KL
- Vehicle registration: KL-73
- Sex ratio: 1,029 male/female
- Literacy: 89.36%

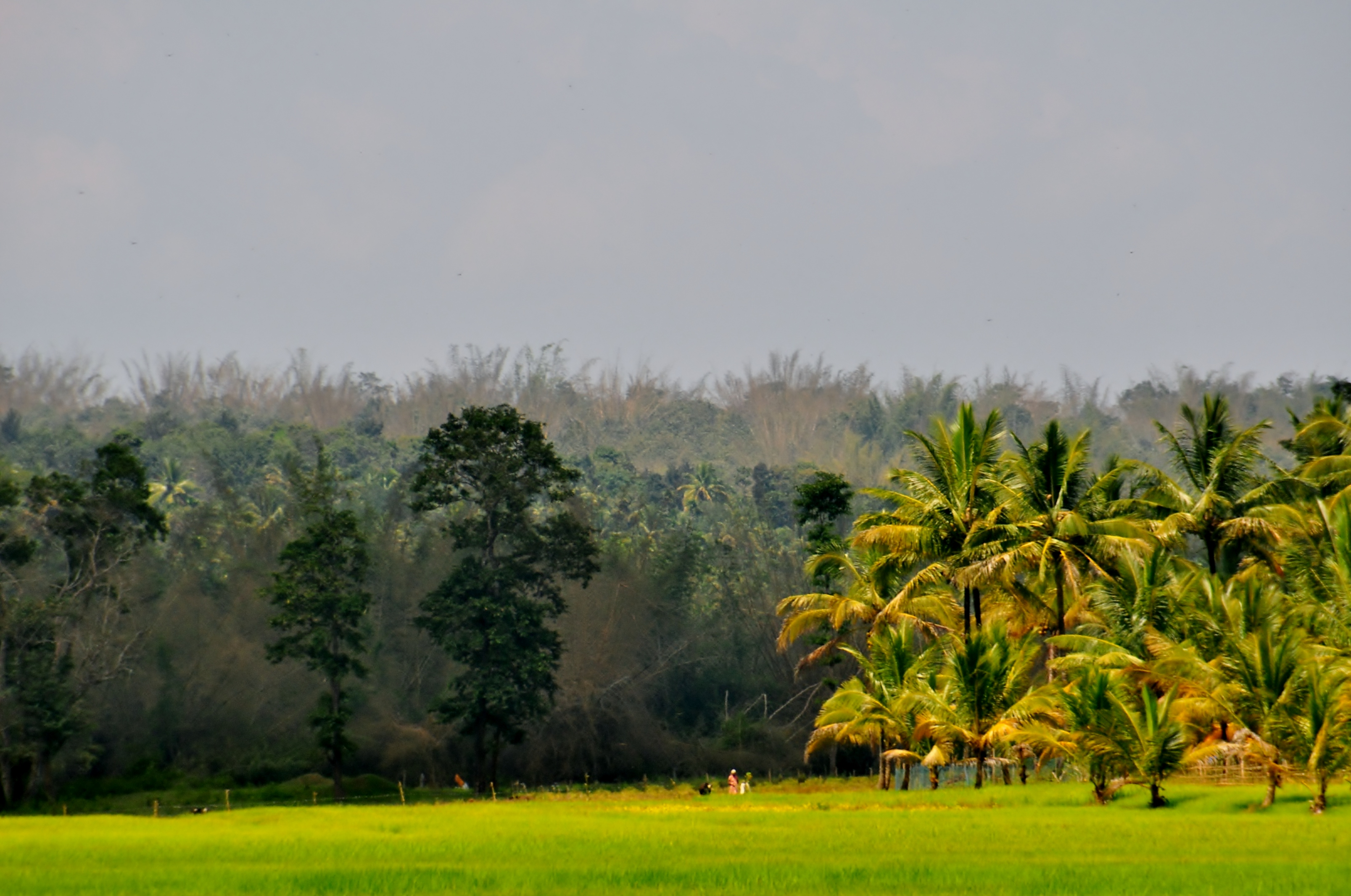
Paddy field in Sultan Bathery

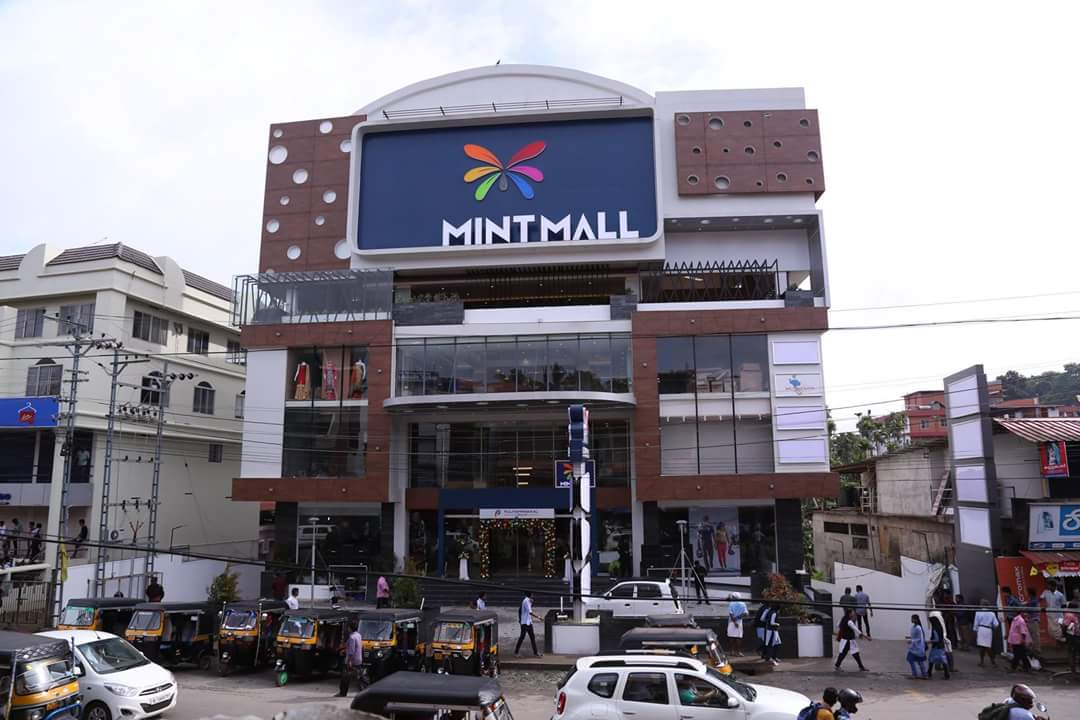
View of a mall in Sultan Bathery

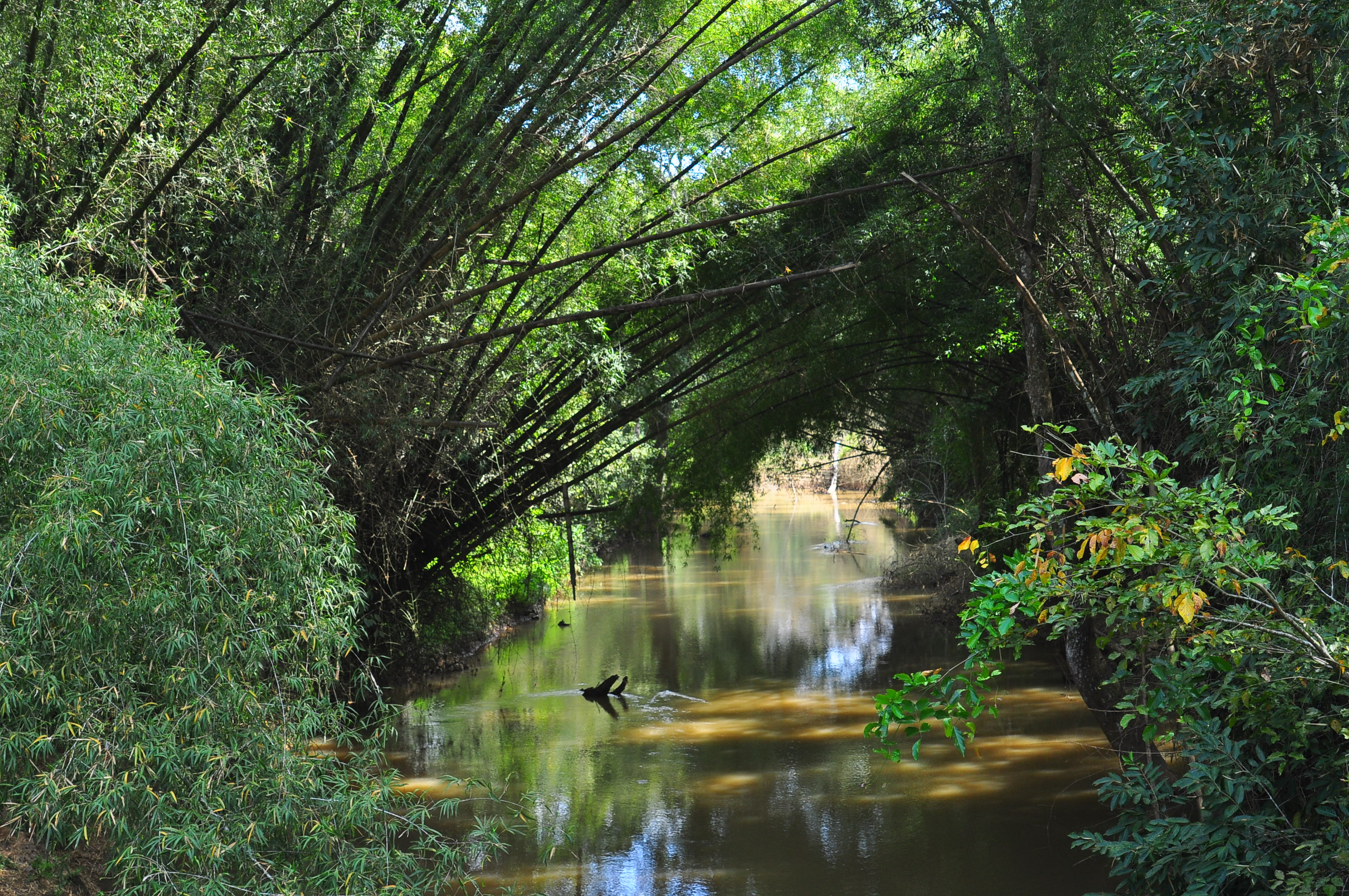
A river in Sultan Bathery

Sulthan Bathery is a major municipal town in the Wayanad district of Kerala, India. It serves as the administrative headquarters of Sulthan Bathery taluk and is the most commercially active urban center in the district.It is named after Tipu Sultan.

== Etymology ==
The modern town was part of Kidanganad village, so-called because of the presence of the Kidangan tribe. During the invasion of Malabar by Mysore ruler Tipu Sultan, the town was used by the Mysore army as the storeroom or battery for its ammunition and used a 13th-century Ganapathi Temple located here as a battery. Thus the town known as "Sultan's Battery" was later referred to in British records as "Sultan Bathery".

== History ==
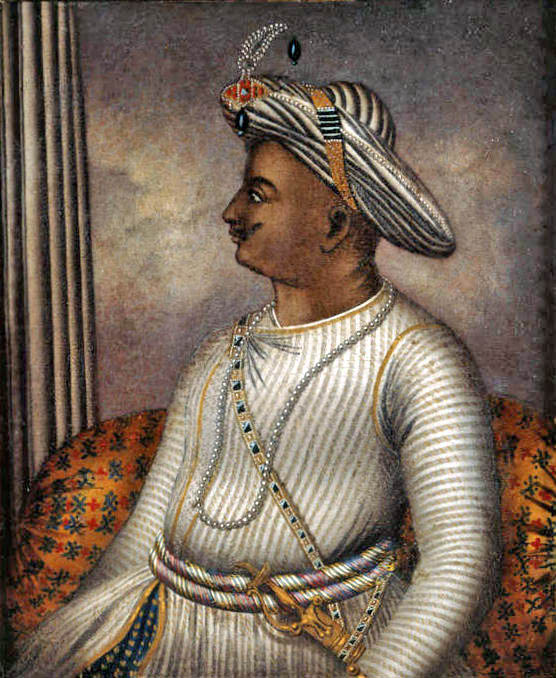
Tipu Sultan

The recorded history of Sultan Bathery, commensurate with that of Wayanad, begins in the 10th century. In 930 AD, Emperor Erayappa of the Ganga dynasty led his troops to what would later become the district in the south-west of Mysore and, after conquering it, called it Bayalnad, meaning the land of swamps. After Erayappa died, his sons Rachamalla and Battunga fought each other for the new kingdom of their father's legacy. Rachamalla was killed and Battunga became the undisputed ruler of Bayalnad.

In the 12th century AD, the Gangas were dethroned by the Kadamba dynasty of North Canara. In 1104 AD, Vishnuvardhana of Hoysala invaded Bayalnad followed by the Vijayanagara dynasty in the 16th century. In 1610 AD, Udaiyar Raja Wadiyar of Mysore drove out Vijayanagara and became the ruler of Bayalnad and the Nilgiris. When Wayanad was under Hyder Ali's rule, the ghat road from Vythiri to Thamarassery was constructed. Later, the British rulers developed this route into Carter Road.

British rule began at the start of the 19th century after the East India Company seized Wayanad from the hands of Pazhassi Raja and administered the district until it was superseded by the British Raj in 1858. Until 1947, Wayanad was under the rule of the Malabar collector. History has it that Wayanad has a rich folk culture that gave way to the British domination of Wayanad. The British named the village Sultan's Battery, which in later history means the Sultan's Armory.

The Edakkal Caves have evidence of the existence of a Neolithic civilisation in Wayanad. According to H. S. Graeme, the Thalassery Sub-Collector T. H. Balan was the first to start a revenue settlement in Wayanad. For administrative convenience, the area was divided into Munnadu, Muthoornadu, Ilangkornadu, Nallurnadu, Edanashankur, Poronnur, Kurumbala, Wayanad, Nambikkoli and Ganapathivattam (Ganapati). The importance and relevance of Ganapati has been mentioned often in the reports. History records that Sultan Bathery later became the place of Ganapati on the roadside during the battle of Hyder Ali and Tipu Sultan.

Ganapati grew as the medieval cities flourished, the four-way street, the main highway, and the center of worship. In 1934, the Kidanganad Panchayat was established. From the administration of the Malabar District Board, Ganapati became the administrative centre of the Kidanganad panchayat. The Niluppuzha Panchayat was formed in 1968 by the division of Kidanganad Panchayat, Nenmeni Panchayat in 1974 and Sultanbathery Panchayat in 1968.

New places of worship and educational institutions have emerged in different parts of the panchayat with the support of Hindu, Muslim and Christian communities. The Ganapati Temple, the Jain Temple and the Malankara Mosque are examples of the ancient history of Sultan Bathery. There is evidence that Sultan Bathery and other parts of Wayanad had been in contact through Tamil, Karnataka and Kodagu villages since medieval times.

== Geography ==
=== Location ===
Sultan Bathery is located at 11.67°N 76.28°E, on the Kozhikode–Kollegal National Highway (NH 766) 97 kilometers from Kozhikode. It is 114 km from Mysore and about 100 km from Ooty (Udagamandalam). It is also connected with Nilambur. It has an average elevation of 907 m (2,976 ft).

=== Climate ===
Sultan Bathery has a humid climate. The mean average rainfall in this area is 2,322 mm. Lakkidi, Vythiri and Meppadi are the high rainfall areas in Wayanad. The annual rainfall in these areas ranges from 3,000 to 4,000 mm. High-velocity winds are common during the southwest monsoon season and dry winds blow in March and April. High altitude regions experience severe cold. In Wayanad (Ambalavayal) the mean maximum and minimum temperature for the last five years were 29 °C and 18 °C respectively. This place experiences high relative humidity, which can rise to 95 per cent during the southwest monsoon period. Generally the year is classified into four seasons, namely, the cold weather (December–February), hot weather (March–May), southwest monsoon (June–September), and northeast monsoon (October–November) seasons.

Climate data for Sultan Bathery, Kerala
Month	Jan	Feb	Mar	Apr	May	Jun	Jul	Aug	Sep	Oct	Nov	Dec	Year
Mean daily maximum °C (°F)	26.3 (79.3)	28.3 (82.9)	30.0 (86.0)	30.1 (86.2)	29.1 (84.4)	25.7 (78.3)	24.2 (75.6)	24.8 (76.6)	25.7 (78.3)	26.1 (79.0)	25.8 (78.4)	25.7 (78.3)	26.8 (80.3)
Mean daily minimum °C (°F)	15.6 (60.1)	16.8 (62.2)	18.5 (65.3)	19.9 (67.8)	20.1 (68.2)	19.1 (66.4)	18.8 (65.8)	18.7 (65.7)	18.5 (65.3)	18.6 (65.5)	17.6 (63.7)	16.1 (61.0)	18.2 (64.8)
Average precipitation mm (inches)	3 (0.1)	8 (0.3)	14 (0.6)	89 (3.5)	171 (6.7)	451 (17.8)	903 (35.6)	497 (19.6)	225 (8.9)	220 (8.7)	79 (3.1)	21 (0.8)	2,681 (105.7)
Source: Climate-Data.org

== Religion and worship ==
In ancient times, the region was home to the native tribes of Chettiars, Paniyar, Kurumar and Urali Nayakkar. Although there are many ethnic groups among the people, their main occupation is agriculture. The panchayath has 26 temples, 15 churches and 15 mosques. Sultan Bathery has a Jain temple that is about 2,000 years old. The center, which is in the possession of the Department of Archeology, has no festivals other than temple rituals. The festival at Sultan Bathery Mariamman Kovil is one of the festivals celebrated here. It is considered to be the national festival of Bathery. Similar festivals are celebrated in the Bathery Mahaganapathi Temple, Kuppadi Devi Temple and Karivallikkunnu Temple.

== Notable landmarks ==
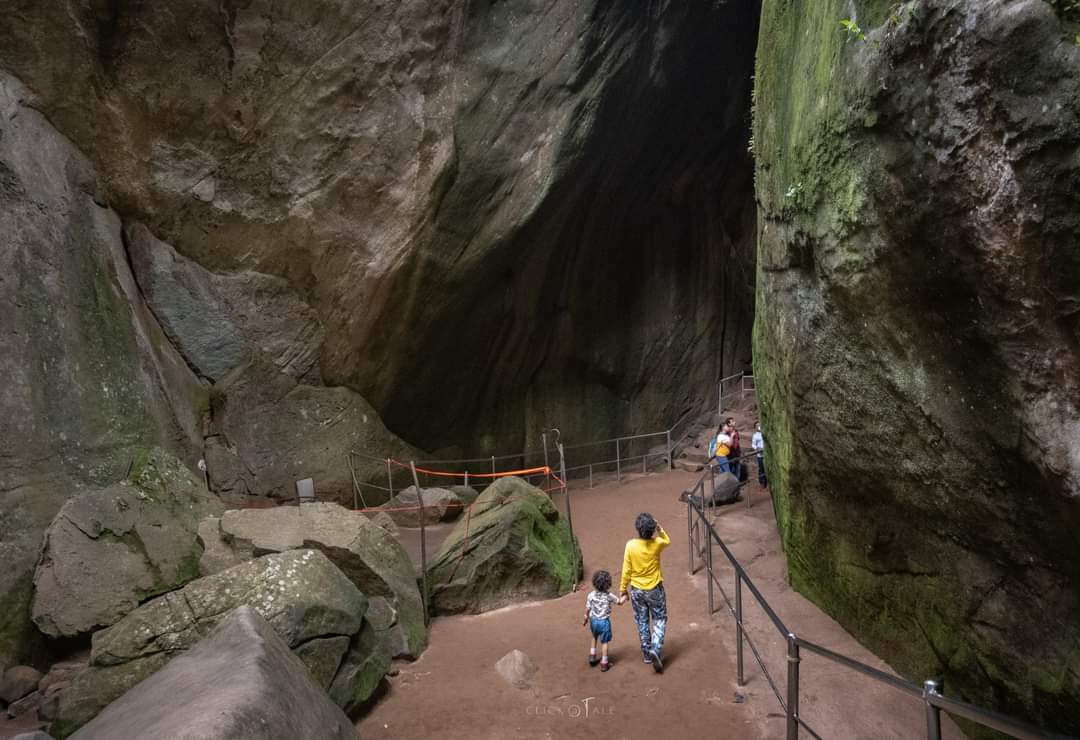
Edakkal caves

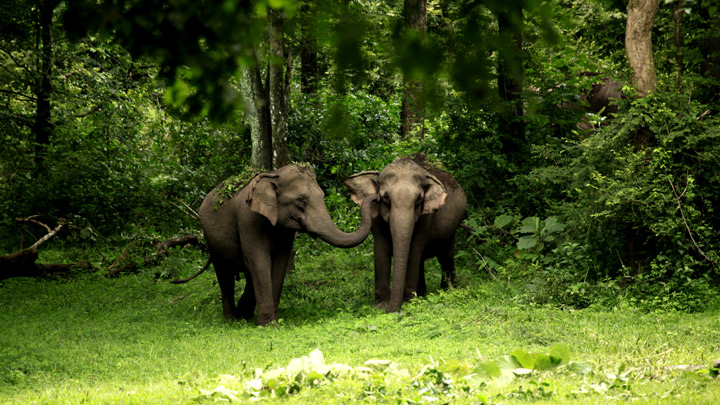
Wayanad wildlife

- Saint Mary Orthodox Cathedral and Pilgrim Centre is the oldest church in Sultan Bathery, established in 1944. The church has the holy relics of three saints and is the headquarters of Sultan Bathery Diocese of the Malankara Orthodox Syrian Church the administrative head of the 48 orthodox parishes in the area. There is also the Nirmalagiri Aramana where the diocesan metropolitan resides in Poomala.
- Edakkal caves are located 10 km from Sultan Bathery and are noted for anthropological research. The caves are two natural rock formations believed to have been formed by a large split in a huge rock.
- Sultan Bathery Jain Temple is one of the prominent Jain temples in Kerala, believed to have been built in the 13th century. This Mahavir stone temple at Kidanganad in Sultan Bathery is also known as Digambara Jain Temple and Kidanganad Basti. The temple architecture, inscriptions and drawings on the pillars and walls are strongly influenced by the architectural style of the Vijayanagara dynasty. An inscription on one of the pillars depicts Dharnendra Bandanam, in the form of a coiled snake.
- Krishnagiri Stadium is a cricket stadium located in Krishnagiri village in Wayanad. It holds up to 20,000 people and at 2,100 feet above sea level is the highest-altitude stadium used exclusively for cricket.
- Thovarimala Ezhuthupara
- Wayanad Heritage Museum, Ambalavayal
- Wayanad Wildlife Sanctuary houses a wide range of mammals, birds and other fauna. The mammals include elephants, tigers, panthers, jungle cats, civet cats, monkeys, wild dogs, bison, deer, and bears. More than 200 species of birds, including peacocks, babblers, cuckoos, owls, woodpeckers and jungle fowl, and 45 species of reptiles like monitor lizard and a variety of snakes and tortoises reside there.

== Transport ==
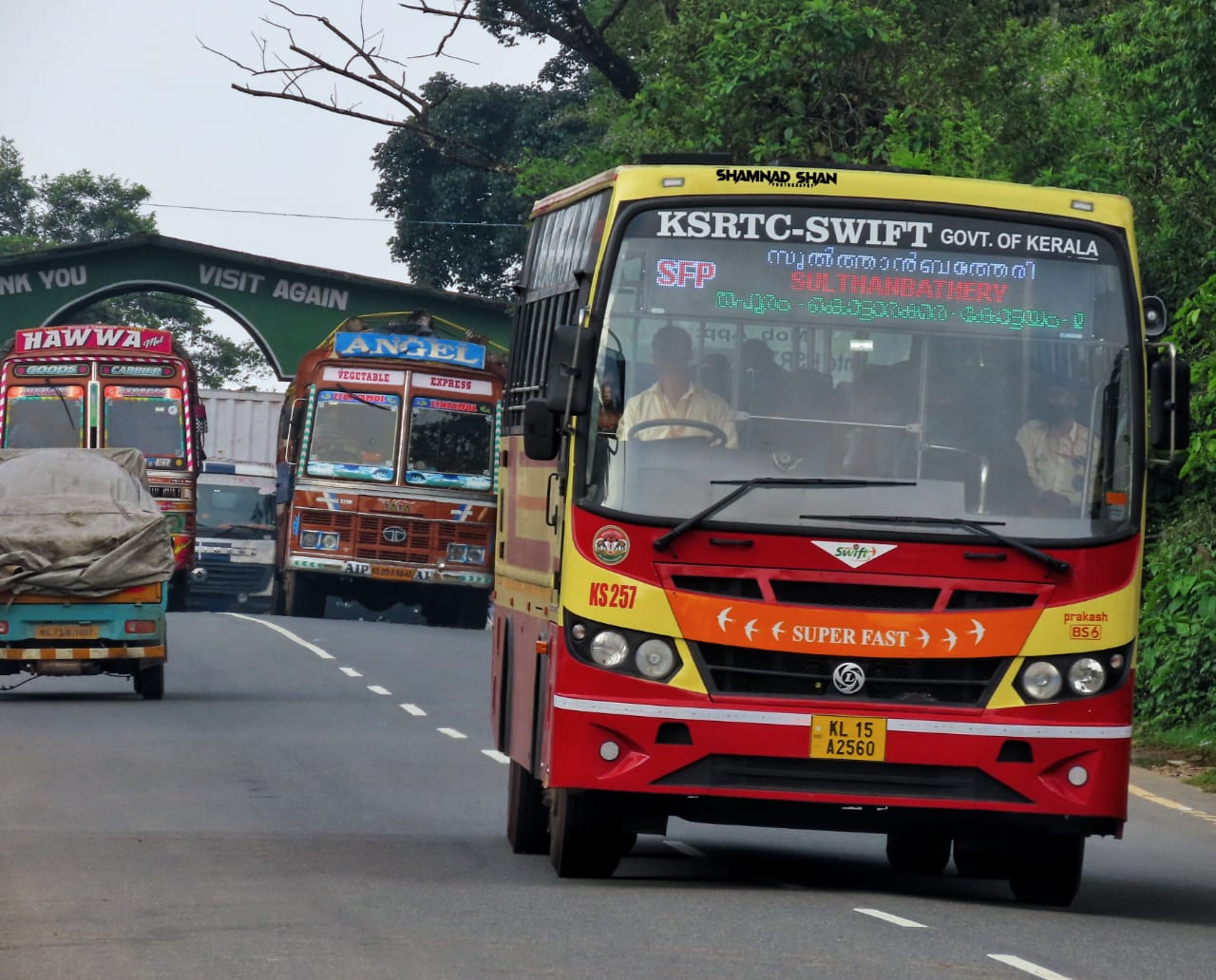
A KSRTC SWIFT bus in the town

Sultan Bathery has very good road connectivity with south Indian states. The major road is NH 766 which connects to Mysore, Bangalore and Kozhikode, two state highways connected to Ooty and Coimbatore and a state highway connected to Mangalore, Kannur, Thalassery and Kasaragod. Sultan Bathery is the biggest transport hub of Wayanad district. It is located near the border with the Karnataka state.

There is a major Kerala Transport Depot in Sultan Bathery. Most of the long-distance buses to Kozhikode, Ooty and Bangalore start from this depot. The town also has two smaller bus stations for local travellers. The Periya ghat road connects Mananthavady to Kannur and Thalassery. The Thamarassery mountain road connects Calicut with Kalpetta. The Kuttiady mountain road connects Vatakara with Kalpetta and Mananthavady. The Palchuram mountain road connects Kannur and Iritty with Mananthavady. The road from Nilambur to Ooty is also connected to Wayanad through the village of Meppadi.

The nearest railway stations are at Mysore and Calicut. The nearest airports are at Mysore, Calicut and Kannur.

== Politics ==
The Sultan Bathery assembly constituency is part of the Wayanad Lok Sabha constituency. Its member of parliament is Priyanka Gandhi of the Indian National Congress (INC) party, and the MLA is I. C. Balakrishnan (INC).

The Sultan Bathery Municipality was governed by the Left Democratic Front (LDF) since 2015. On general election 2025 UDF came to power for the first time after formation of municipality .

- Chairperson: Raseena Abdulkhader (IUML )
- Vice Chairperson: Indrajith M G (INC)

Since its establishment in 1962, the Bathery panchayat (council) has mainly been held by the INC-led United Democratic Front (UDF). P. C. Ahmed Haji of the Indian Union Muslim League was the first president and held office for three decades. The LDF was in power for only eight months in 2005 with the help of the Democratic Indira Congress (Kerala) party. The president was CK Sahadevan, who later became the first chairman when it was converted to a municipality in 2015.

=== Municipality Chairperson ===
Sultan Bathery Municipality Chairperson list
No:	Name	Party	Year		Division
1	C. K. Sahadevan	CPI(M)	18 November 2015–03/04/2018	1st	Beenachi
2	T. L. Sabu	Kerala Congress (M)	26 April 2018–11 November 2020	1st	Kattayad
3	T. K. Ramesh	CPI(M)	28 December 2020– 20 December 2025	2nd	Dottappankulam
4	Raseena Abdulkhadar	IUML	26 December 2025– incumbent	3rd	C Kunnu

=== Members of Legislative Assembly ===
Election	Niyama Sabha	Member	Party	Tenure
1977	5th	K. Raghavan Master	INC	1977–1980
1980	6th	K. K. Ramachandran Master	INC	1980–1982
1982	7th	K. K. Ramachandran Master	INC	1982–1987
1987	8th	K. K. Ramachandran Master	INC	1987–1991
1991	9th	K. C. Rosakutty	INC	1991–1996
1996	10th	P. V. Varghese Vaidyar	CPI(M)	1996–2001
2001	11th	N. D. Appachan	INC	2001–2006
2006	12th	P. Krishna Prasad	CPI(M)	2006–2011
2011	13th	I. C. Balakrishnan	INC	2011–2016
2016	14th	I. C. Balakrishnan	INC	2016–2021
2021	15th	I. C. Balakrishnan	INC	2021–2026

=== Municipality Vice Chairperson ===
Sultan Bathery Municipality Vice Chairperson list
No:	Name	Party	Year		Division
1	Jisha Shaji	CPI(M)	18/11/2015–11 November 2020	1st	Kuppady
2	Elsy Paulose	CPI(M)	28/12/2020–20/12/2025	2nd	Sultan Bathery
3	Indrajith M G	INC	26/12/2020–incumbent	3rd	Cheroorkunnu

=== Grama Panchayat President ===
Sultan Bathery Grama Panchayat President List
No:	Name	Party	Year
1	P. C. Ahamad Haji	IUML	1969-1978
2	Special Officer	–	1978–1980
3	P. C. Ahamad Haji	IUML	1980–1985
4	Special Officer	–	1985-1988
5	P. C. Ahamad Haji	IUML	1988-1995
6	P. C. Ahamad Haji	IUML	1995-1998
7	N. M. Vijayan	INC	1998–2000
8	Nafeeza Ahamad koya	IUML	2000–2005
9	C. K. Sahadevan	CPI(M)	2005–2006
10	Babu Pazhupathoor	INC	2006-2006
11	Radha Raveendran	INC	2006–2009
12	O. M. George	INC	2009–2010
13	P. P. Ayyoob	IUML	2010–2012
14	O. M. George	INC	2012–2015

== Notable residents ==
- Basil Joseph, director and actor in the Malayalam film industry

== See also ==
- Jainism in Kerala
- Mysorean invasion of Malabar
- Sultan Battery (Mangalore)
