= 2001 Kerala Legislative Assembly election =

2001 Kerala Legislative Assembly Election
- 10 May 2001

All 140 seats in the Kerala Legislative Assembly 71 seats needed for a majority
- Turnout: 72.47% (▲1.31)
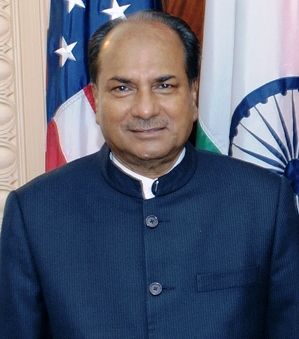

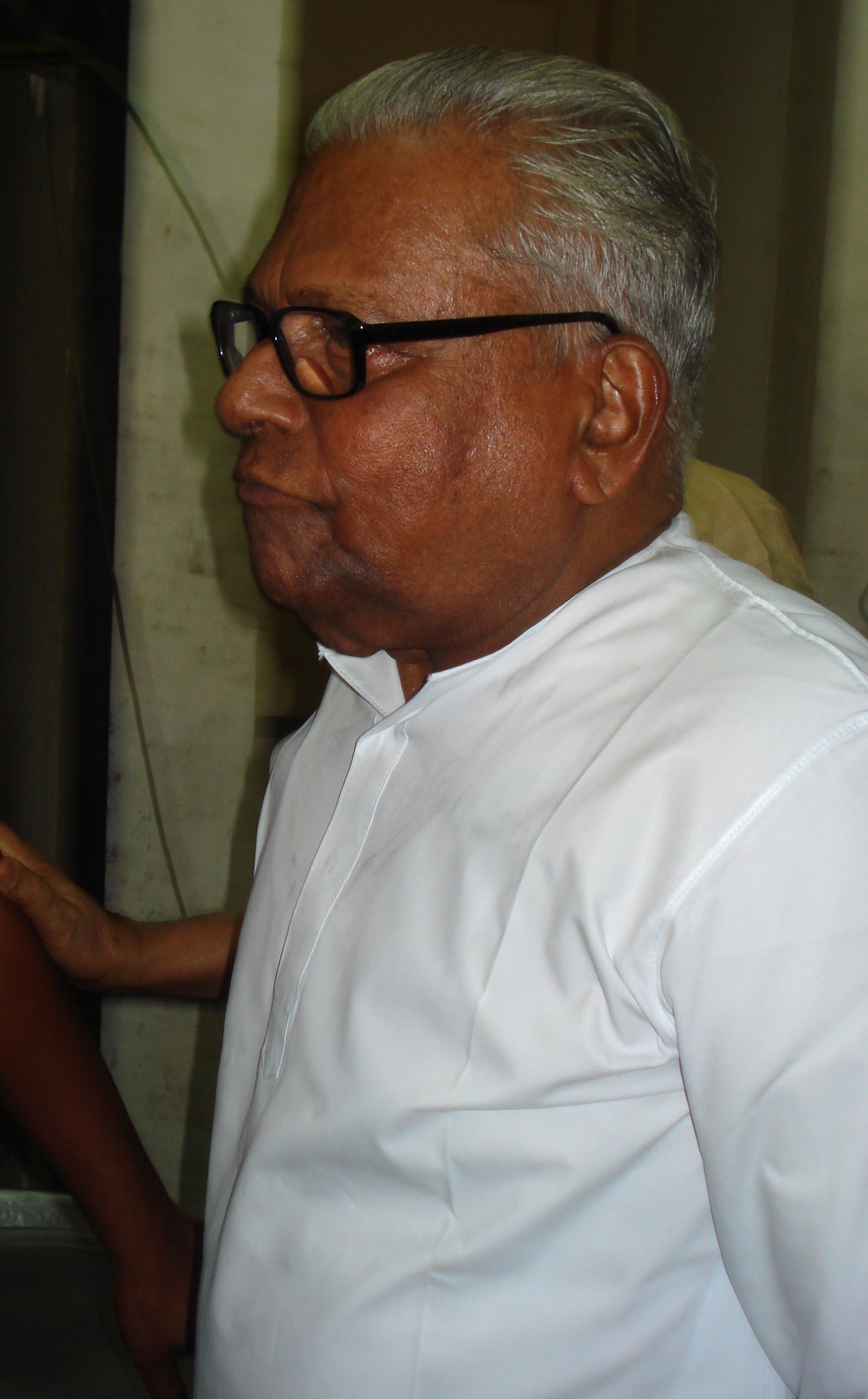
	First party	Second party
Leader	A. K. Antony	V. S. Achuthanandan
Party	INC	CPI(M)
Alliance	UDF	LDF
Leader's seat	Cherthala	Malampuzha
Last election	37	40
Seats won	63	24
Seat change	▲26	▼16
Popular vote	4,940,868	3,752,976
Percentage	31.4%	23.85%
Alliance seats	99	40
Alliance seat change	▲40	▼40
Alliance Popular Vote	7,719,454	6,876,897
Alliance Vote Share	49.05%	43.70%
- Alliance wise Structure
Chief Minister before election
E. K. Nayanar
CPI(M)
Elected Chief Minister
A. K. Antony
INC

The 2001 Kerala Legislative Assembly election was held on 10 May 2001 to elect members to the Kerala State Assembly. Polls were held simultaneously in all 140 seats and resulted in a voter turnout of 72.47%.

The election saw a change of guard in the state with the United Democratic Front winning 99 seats as opposed to the 40 won by the Left Democratic Front. The remaining seat was won by a UDF rebel candidate.

This election was the last one in which the Indian National Congress was the largest party in the legislative assembly until 2026, with the Communist Party of India (Marxist) emerging as the leading party in every successive election, including in 2011, when the UDF won by a wafer-thin margin of 2 seats, until the defeat of the Left Front in 2026.

== Schedule ==
Event	Date
Date for Nominations	16 April 2001
Last Date for filing Nominations	23 April 2001
Date for scrutiny of nominations	24 April 2001
Last date for withdrawal of candidatures	26 April 2001
Date of poll	10 May 2001
Date of counting	13 May 2001

== Parties and alliances ==
=== United Democratic Front (Kerala) ===
United Democratic Front (Kerala)

Party	Flag	Symbol	Leader	Contesting Seats
Indian National Congress (Indira)			A. K. Antony	88
Indian Union Muslim League			E. Ahamed	21
Kerala Congress (Mani)			K. M. Mani	11
Janathipathiya Samrakshana Samithy			K. R. Gouri Amma	5
Revolutionary Socialist Party (Bolshevik)				4
Kerala Congress (Jacob)			T. M. Jacob	3
Communist Marxist Party				2
Kerala Congress (B)			R. Balakrishna Pillai	2
UDF-supported Independents				4
Total				140

=== Left Democratic Front (Kerala) ===
Left Democratic Front (Kerala)

Party	Flag	Symbol	Leader	Contesting Seats
Communist Party of India (Marxist)			E. K. Nayanar	65
Communist Party of India			A. B. Bardhan	22
Janata Dal (Secular) (Note: This Symbol was used by JD(S) until 2001)			H. D. Deve Gowda	10
Kerala Congress (Joseph)			P. J. Joseph	10
Nationalist Congress Party			Sharad Pawar	9
Revolutionary Socialist Party				6
Indian National League				1
LDF-Independents				17
Total				140

=== National Democratic Alliance ===
National Democratic Alliance

Party	Flag	Symbol	Leader	Contesting Seats
Bharatiya Janata Party			A. B. Vajpayee	123
Janata Dal (United)			Nitish Kumar	4
Samata Party			George Fernandes	2
Dravida Munnetra Kazhagam			M. Karunanidhi	1
Total				140

== List of candidates ==
Constituency		UDF		LDF	
#	Name	Candidate	Party	Candidate	Party
1	Manjeswar	Cherkalam Abdullah	IUML	M. Ramanna Rai	CPI(M)
2	Kasaragod	C. T. Ahammed Ali	IUML	A. G. Nair	CPI(M)
3	Udma	Adv. C. K. Sreedharan	INC	K. V. Kunhiraman	CPI(M)
4	Hosdrug (SC)	C. J. Krishnan	INC	M. Kumaran	CPI
5	Trikkaripur	Karimbil Krishnan	INC	K. P. Satheesh Chandran	CPI(M)
6	Irikkur	K. C. Joseph	INC	Prof. Mercy John	KEC
7	Payyannur	M. Narayanan Kutty	INC	P. K. Sreemathi Teacher	CPI(M)
8	Taliparamba	K. Surendran	INC	M. V. Govindan Master	CPI(M)
9	Azhicode	C. A. Ajeer	CMP	T. K. Balan	CPI(M)
10	Cannanore	K. Sudhakaran	INC	Kasim Irikkur	IND
11	Edakkad	N. Ramakrishnan	INC	M. V. Jayarajan	CPI(M)
12	Tellicherry	Sajeev Maroli	INC	Kodiyeri Balakrishnan	CPI(M)
13	Peringalam	K. K. Muhammad	IUML	K. P. Mohanan	JD(S)
14	Kuthuparamba	K. Prabhakaran	INC	P. Jayarajan	CPI(M)
15	Peravoor	Prof. A. D. Mustaffa	INC	K. T. Kunha Hammed	NCP
16	North Wynad (ST)	Radha Raghavan	INC	Saradha Sajeevan	CPI(M)
17	Badagara	K. Balanarayanan	INC	C. K. Nanu	JD(S)
18	Nadapuram	K. P. Rajan	INC	Benoy Viswam	CPI
19	Meppayur	P. Ammed Master	IUML	Mathai Chacko	CPI(M)
20	Quilandy	Adv. P. Sankaran	INC	P. Viswan	CPI(M)
21	Perambra	P. T. Jose	KC(M)	T. P. Ramakrishnan	CPI(M)
22	Balusseri	Balakrishnan Kidave	INC	A. C. Shanmughadas	NCP
23	Koduvally	C. Mammutty	IUML	C. Mohasin	JD(S)
24	Calicut- I	Adv. A. Sujana Pal	INC	Adv. P. Sathee Devi	CPI(M)
25	Calicut- II	T. P. M. Zahir	IUML	Elamaram Karim	CPI(M)
26	Beypore	M. C. Mayin Haji	IUML	V. K. C. Mammed Koya	CPI(M)
27	Kunnamangalam (SC)	U. C. Raman	IND	Perincheri Kunhan	CPI(M)
28	Thiruvambadi	C. Moinkutty	IUML	Syriac John	NCP
29	Kalpetta	K. K. Ramachandran Master	INC	K. K. Hamza	JD(S)
30	Sultan's Battery	N. D. Appachan	INC	Father Mathai Nooranal	IND
31	Wandoor (SC)	A. P. Anilkumar	INC	N. Kannan	CPI(M)
32	Nilambur	Aryadan Muhammed	INC	P. Anvar Master	IND
33	Manjeri	Ishaque Kurikkal	IUML	Prof. Abraham P. Mathew	JD(S)
34	Malappuram	M. K. Muneer	IUML	K. S. Vijayam	NCP
35	Kondotty	Adv. K. N. A. Kader	IUML	E. K. Maleeha	CPI(M)
36	Tirurangadi	K. Kutty Ahammed Kutty	IUML	A. V. Abdu Haji	IND
37	Tanur	P. K. Abdu Rabb	IUML	K. V. Sidheeque	CPI(M)
38	Tirur	E. T. Mohammed Basheer	IUML	Prof. A. P. Abdul Vahab	INL
39	Ponnani	M. P. Gangadharan	INC	T. K. Hamza	CPI(M)
40	Kuttippuram	P. K. Kunhalikutty	IUML	Kolakkattil Ibrahimkutty	RSP
41	Mankada	K. P. A. Majeed	IUML	Manjalamkuzhi Ali	IND
42	Perinthalmanna	Nalakath Soopy	IUML	Sasikumar	CPI(M)
43	Thrithala (SC)	P. Balan	INC	V. K. Chandran	CPI(M)
44	Pattambi	C. P. Mohammed	INC	K. E. Ismail	CPI
45	Ottapalam	C. V. Balachandran Master	INC	V. C. Kabeer Master	NCP
46	Sreekrishnapuram	V. S. Vijaya Raghavan	INC	Girija Surendran	CPI(M)
47	Mannarkkad	Kalathil Abdulla	IUML	Jose Baby	CPI
48	Malampuzha	Satheesan Pacheni	INC	V. S. Achuthanadan	CPI(M)
49	Palghat	K. Sankara Narayanan	INC	T. K. Noushad	CPI(M)
50	Chittur	K. Achuthan Chalakalam	INC	K. Krishnankutty Ezhuthanikalam	JD(S)
51	Kollengode	K. A. Chandran	INC	R. Chinnakuttan	CPI(M)
52	Coyalmannam (SC)	C. Prakash	INC	A. K. Balan	CPI(M)
53	Alathur	R. Chellamma Teacher	INC	V. Chenthamarakshan	CPI(M)
54	Chelakara (SC)	K. A. Thulasi	INC	K. Radhakrishnan	CPI(M)
55	Wadakkancherry	V. Balram	INC	M. P. Pauly	KEC
56	Kunnamkulam	T. V. Chandramohan	INC	Usha Teacher	CPI(M)
57	Cherpu	M. K. Kannan	IND	Adv. K. P. Rajendran	CPI
58	Trichur	Therambil Ramakrishnan	INC	K. P. Aravindakshan	CPI(M)
59	Ollur	P. P. George	INC	C. N. Jayadevan	CPI
60	Kodakara	K. P. Viswanathan	INC	Lonappan Nambadan	IND
61	Chalakudi	Prof. Savithri Lakshmanan	INC	M. A. Paulose	JD(S)
62	Mala	T. U. Radhakrishnan	INC	U. S. Sasi	CPI
63	Irinjalakuda	Thomas Unniyadan	KC(M)	T. Sasidharan	CPI(M)
64	Manalur	M. K. Paulson Master	INC	N. R. Balan	CPI(M)
65	Guruvayoor	P. K. K. Bhava	IUML	P. T. Kunju Muhammad	IND
66	Nattika	T. N. Prathapan	INC	Krishnan Kaniyamparambil	CPI
67	Kodungallur	Umesh Challiyil	JSS	Prof. Meenakshi Thampan	CPI
68	Ankamali	P. J. Joy	INC	Prof. V. J. Pappu	IND
69	Vadakkekara	M. A. Chndrasekharan	INC	Adv. P. Rajeev	CPI(M)
70	Parur	Adv. V. D. Satheesan	INC	P. Raju	CPI
71	Narakal (SC)	Dr. M. A. Kuttappan	INC	M. K. Purushothaman	CPI(M)
72	Ernakulam	Prof. K. V. Thomas	INC	Sebastian Paul	IND
73	Mattancherry	V. K. Ebrahimkunju	IUML	M. A. Thomas	IND
74	Palluruthy	Dominic Presentation	INC	T. P. Peethambaran	NCP
75	Trippunithura	K. Babu	INC	K. Chandran Pillai	CPI(M)
76	Alwaye	K. Mohammed Ali	INC	K. K. Sajitha	IND
77	Perumbavoor	P. P. Thankachan	INC	Saju Paul	CPI(M)
78	Kunnathunad	T. H. Musthafa	INC	M. P. Varghese	CPI(M)
79	Piravom	T. M. Jacob	KC(J)	Gopi Kottamurikal	CPI(M)
80	Muvattupuzha	Johnny Nellore	KC(J)	George Kunnappilly	CPI
81	Kothamangalam	V. J. Poulose	INC	Baby M. Varghese	KEC
82	Thodupuzha	P. T. Thomas	INC	P. J. Joseph	KEC
83	Devicolam (SC)	A. K. Moni	INC	K. Balasubrahmanian	CPI(M)
84	Idukki	Roshy Augustine	KC(M)	M. S. Joseph	IND
85	Udumbanchola	Mathew Stephan	IND	K. K. Jayachandran	CPI(M)
86	Peermade	E. M. Augasthy	INC	C. A. Kurian	CPI
87	Kanjirappally	George J. Mathew	INC	Shanavas	CPI(M)
88	Vazhoor	K. Narayana Kurup	KC(M)	A. N. Thulasidas	CPI
89	Changanacherry	C. F. Thomas	KC(M)	James Manimala	IND
90	Kottayam	Mercy Ravi	INC	Vaikom Viswan	CPI(M)
91	Ettumanoor	Thomas Chazhikadan	KC(M)	Thambippodippara	CPI(M)
92	Puthuppally	Oommen Chandy	INC	Cherian Philip	IND
93	Poonjar	T. V. Abraham	KC(M)	P. C. George	KEC
94	Palai	K. M. Mani	KC(M)	Uzhavoor Vijayan	NCP
95	Kaduthuruthy	Stephen George	KC(M)	Mons Joseph	KEC
96	Vaikom (SC)	K. V. Padmanabhan	INC	P. Narayanan	CPI
97	Aroor	K. R. Gouri Amma	JSS	K. V. Devadas	CPI(M)
98	Sherthalai	A. K. Antony	INC	C. K. Chandrappan	CPI
99	Mararikulam	P. J. Francis	INC	T. M. Thomas Isaac	CPI(M)
100	Alleppey	K. C. Venugopal	INC	A. M. Abdul Raheem	IND
101	Ambalapuzha	D. Sugathan	INC	C. K. Sadasivan	CPI(M)
102	Kuttanad	Oommen Mathew	KC(J)	K. C. Joseph	KEC
103	Haripad	A. V. Thamarakshan	RSPK	T. K. Devakumar	CPI(M)
104	Kayamkulam	M. M. Hassan	INC	G. Sudhakaran	CPI(M)
105	Thiruvalla	Mammen Mathai	KC(M)	Varghese George	JD(S)
106	Kallooppara	Joseph M. Puthussery	KC(M)	T. S. John	KEC
107	Aranmula	Malethu Sarala Devi	INC	A. Padmakumar	CPI(M)
108	Chengannur	Shobhana George	INC	K. K. Ramachandran Nair	CPI(M)
109	Mavelikara	M. Murali	INC	N. V. Pradeepkumar	NCP
110	Pandalam (SC)	K. K. Shaju	JSS	K. L. Bindhu	CPI(M)
111	Ranni	Bijili Panaveli	INC	Raju Abraham	CPI(M)
112	Pathanamthitta	K. K. Nair	INC	Jerry Easo Oommen	KEC
113	Konni	Adoor Prakash	INC	Kadammanitta Ramakrishnan	IND
114	Pathanapuram	K. B. Ganesh Kumar	KC(B)	K. Prakash Babu	CPI
115	Punaloor	A. Hidur Muhammod	INC	P. S. Supal	CPI
116	Chadayamangalam	Prayar Gopalakrishnan	INC	R. Latha Devi	CPI
117	Kottarakara	R. Balakrishna Pillai	KC(B)	V. Raveendran Nair	CPI(M)
118	Neduvathur (SC)	Ezhukone Narayanan	INC	K. Somaprasad	CPI(M)
119	Adoor	Thiruvanchoor Radhakrishnan	INC	Pallickal Prasannakumar	IND
120	Kunnathur (SC)	Pandalam Sudhakaran	INC	Kovoor Kunjumon	RSP
121	Karunagapally	A. N. Rajan Babu	JSS	K. C. Pillai	CPI
122	Chavara	Shibu Baby John	RSPK	V. P. Ramakrishna Pillai	RSP
123	Kundara	Kadavoor Sivadasan	INC	J. Mercykutty Amma	CPI(M)
124	Quilon	Babu Divakaran	RSPK	Kallada Vijayam	RSP
125	Eravipuram	T. A. Ahmed Kabir	IUML	A. A. Aziz	RSP
126	Chathanoor	G. Prathapa Thampan	INC	N. Anirudhan	CPI
127	Varkala	Varkala Kahar	INC	P. K. Gurudasan	CPI(M)
128	Attingal	Vakkom Purushothaman	INC	Kadakampally Surendran	CPI(M)
129	Kilimanoor (SC)	K. Chandrababu	RSPK	N. Rajan	CPI
130	Vamanapuram	S. Shine	JSS	Pirappancode Murali	CPI(M)
131	Ariyanad	G. Karthikeyan	INC	G. Arjunan	RSP
132	Nedumangad	Palode Ravi	INC	Mankode Radhakrishnan	CPI
133	Kazhakuttam	M. A. Vaheed	IND	Bindu Ummar	CPI(M)
134	Trivandrum North	K. Mohankumar	INC	M. Vijayakumar	CPI(M)
135	Trivandrum West	M. V. Raghavan	CMP	Antony Raju	KEC
136	Trivandrum East	B. Vijayakumar	INC	K. Krishna Pillai	NCP
137	Nemom	N. Sakthan	INC	Venganoor P. Bhaskaran	CPI(M)
138	Kovalam	Alphonsa John	INC	Neelalohithadasan Nadar	JD(S)
139	Neyyattinkara	Thampanoor Ravi	INC	S. B. Rosechandran	JD(S)
140	Parassala	N. Sundaran Nadar	INC	R. Selvaraj	CPI(M)

== Results ==
Party-wise vote share of 2001 Kerala Assembly Elections
#	Party	Contested	Won	Popular Votes	Share (%)
1	Indian National Congress- Indira (Congress-I)	88	63	4940868	31.4
2	Communist Party of India (Marxist) (CPI(M))	74	24	3752976	23.85
3	Indian Union Muslim League (IUML)	23	16	1259572	8
4	Kerala Congress – Mani (KCM)	11	9	556647	3.54
5	Communist Party of India (CPI)	24	7	1212248	7.7
6	Janadhipatya Samrakshana Samithi (JSS)	5	4	279831	1.78
7	Janata Dal- Secular (JDS)	10	3	546917	3.48
8	Kerala Congress – Joseph (KCJ)	10	2	455748	2.9
9	Nationalist Congress Party (NCP)	9	2	408456	2.6
10	Revolutionary Socialist Party (RSP)	6	2	269689	1.71
11	Revolutionary Socialist Party – Bolshevik (RSPB)	4	2	215562	1.37
12	Kerala Congress – Jacob (KCA)	4	2	207618	1.32
13	Kerala Congress – Balakrishna Pillai (KCB)	2	2	113915	0.72
14	Communist Marxist Party (CMP)	3	1	145441	0.92
15	Indian National League (INL)	3	0	139775	0.89
16	CPI(M) Independents (LDF)	2	0	91058	0.58
17	Bharatiya Janata Party (BJP)	123	0	789762	5.02
18	BJP Allies (JD(U): 4, Samata: 2, DMK: 1)	7	0	10089	0.06
19	Others/ Independents	266	1	340692	2.16
Total		676	140	15736894	100

=== Constituency-wise results ===
Constituency		Winner				Runner-up				Margin
No.	Name	Candidate	Party	Alliance	Votes	Candidate	Party	Alliance	Votes	Margin
Kasaragod district
1	Manjeswar	Cherkalam Abdullah	IUML	UDF	47,494	C. K. Padmanabhan	BJP	NDA	34,306	13,188
2	Kasaragod	C. T. Ahammed Ali	IUML	UDF	51,890	P. K. Krishna Das	BJP	NDA	33,895	17,995
3	Udma	K. V. Kunhiraman	CPI(M)	LDF	62,817	Adv. C. K. Sreedharan	INC	UDF	53,153	9,664
4	Hosdrug (SC)	M. Kumaran	CPI	LDF	68,033	C. J. Krishnan	INC	UDF	61,055	6,978
5	Trikkaripur	Satheesh Chandran K. P.	CPI(M)	LDF	79,874	Karimbil Krishnan	INC	UDF	62,865	17,009
Kannur district
6	Irikkur	K. C. Joseph	INC	UDF	67,788	Prof. Mercy John	KC	LDF	50,884	16,904
7	Payyannur	P. K. Sreemathi Teacher	CPI(M)	LDF	73,233	M. Narayanan Kutty	INC	UDF	50,495	22,738
8	Taliparamba	M. V. Govindan Master	CPI(M)	LDF	76,975	K. Surendran	INC	UDF	61,688	15,287
9	Azhicode	T. K. Balan	CPI(M)	LDF	56,573	C. A. Ajeer	CMP	UDF	46,777	9,796
10	Cannanore	K. Sudhakaran	INC	UDF	58,080	Kasim Irikkur	Ind.	LDF	38,947	19,133
11	Edakkad	M. V. Jayarajan	CPI(M)	LDF	65,835	N. Ramakrishnan	INC	UDF	60,506	5,329
12	Tellicherry	Kodiyeri Balakrishnan	CPI(M)	LDF	53,412	Sajeev Maroli	INC	UDF	46,369	7,043
13	Peringalam	K. P. Mohanan S/o P. R. Kurup	JD(S)	LDF	52,657	K. K. Muhammad	IUML	UDF	45,679	6,978
14	Kuthuparamba	P. Jayarajan	CPI(M)	LDF	71,240	K. Prabhakaran	INC	UDF	52,620	18,620
15	Peravoor	Prof. A. D. Mustaffa	INC	UDF	64,835	K. T. Kunha Hammed	NCP	LDF	63,662	1,173
Wayanad district
16	North Wynad (ST)	Radha Raghavan	INC	UDF	65,684	Saradha Sajeevan	CPI(M)	LDF	51,839	13,845
Kozhikode district
17	Badagara	C. K. Nanu	JD(S)	LDF	61,636	K. Balanarayanan	INC	UDF	47,477	14,159
18	Nadapuram	Benoy Viswam	CPI	LDF	64,110	K. P. Rajan	INC	UDF	57,917	6,193
19	Meppayur	Mathai Chacko	CPI(M)	LDF	63,709	P. Ammed Master	IUML	UDF	58,953	4,756
20	Quilandy	Adv. P. Sankaran	INC	UDF	66,644	P. Viswan	CPI(M)	LDF	60,188	6,456
21	Perambra	T. P. Ramakrishnan	CPI(M)	LDF	66,695	P. T. Jose	KC(M)	UDF	64,011	2,684
22	Balusseri	A. C. Shanmukhadas	NCP	LDF	54,218	Balakrishnan Kidave	INC	UDF	51,256	2,962
23	Koduvally	C. Mammutty	IUML	UDF	65,209	C. Mohasin	JD(S)	LDF	48,332	16,877
24	Calicut-I	Adv. A. Sujanapal	INC	UDF	52,226	Adv. P. Sathee Devi	CPI(M)	LDF	43,849	8,377
25	Calicut-II	T. P. M. Zahir	IUML	UDF	48,886	Elamaram Karim	CPI(M)	LDF	48,099	787
26	Beypore	V. K. C. Mammed Koya	CPI(M)	LDF	62,636	M. C. Mayin Haji	IUML	UDF	57,565	5,071
27	Kunnamangalam (SC)	U. C. Raman	Ind.	UDF	55,321	Perincheri Kunhan	CPI(M)	LDF	51,610	3,711
28	Thiruvambadi	C. Moinkutty	IUML	UDF	60,525	Syriac John	NCP	LDF	44,849	15,676
Wayanad district
29	Kalpetta	K. K. Ramachandran Master	INC	UDF	58,380	K. K. Hamza	JD(S)	LDF	40,940	17,440
30	Sultan's Battery	N. D. Appachan	INC	UDF	68,685	Father Mathai Nooranal	Ind.	LDF	45,132	23,553
Malappuram district
31	Wandoor (SC)	A. P. Anilkumar	INC	UDF	80,059	N. Kannan	CPI(M)	LDF	51,834	28,225
32	Nilambur	Aryadan Muhammed	INC	UDF	76,937	P. Anvar Master	Ind.	LDF	55,317	21,620
33	Manjeri	Ishaque Kurikkal	IUML	UDF	71,529	Prof. Abraham P. Mathew	JD(S)	LDF	36,933	34,596
34	Malappuram	M. K. Muneer	IUML	UDF	61,924	K. S. Vijayam	NCP	LDF	25,907	36,017
35	Kondotty	Adv. K. N. A. Kader	IUML	UDF	64,224	E. K. Maleeha	CPI(M)	LDF	37,131	27,093
36	Tirurangadi	K. Kutty Ahammed Kutty	IUML	UDF	57,027	A. V. Abdu Haji	Ind.	LDF	37,854	19,173
37	Tanur	P. K. Abdu Rabb	IUML	UDF	55,562	K. V. Sidheeque	CPI(M)	LDF	28,548	27,014
38	Tirur	E. T. Mohammed Basheer	IUML	UDF	58,270	Prof. A. P. Abdul Vahab	INL	LDF	45,511	12,759
39	Ponnani	M. P. Gangadharan	INC	UDF	58,054	T. K. Hamza	CPI(M)	LDF	51,447	6,607
40	Kuttippuram	P. K. Kunhalikutty	IUML	UDF	50,201	Kolakkattil Ibrahimkutty	RSP	LDF	24,096	26,105
41	Mankada	Manjalamkuzhi Ali	Ind.	LDF	67,758	K. P. A. Majeed	IUML	UDF	64,700	3,058
42	Perinthalmanna	Nalakath Soopy	IUML	UDF	64,072	Sasikumar	CPI(M)	LDF	58,166	5,906
Palakkad district
43	Thrithala (SC)	V. K. Chandran	CPI(M)	LDF	54,762	P. Balan	INC	UDF	54,263	499
44	Pattambi	C. P. Mohammed	INC	UDF	53,456	K. E. Ismail	CPI	LDF	52,925	531
45	Ottapalam	V. C. Kabeer Master	NCP	LDF	57,895	C. V. Balachandran Master	INC	UDF	40,045	17,850
46	Sreekrishnapuram	Girija Surendran	CPI(M)	LDF	62,500	V. S. Vijaya Raghavan	INC	UDF	62,479	21
47	Mannarkkad	Kalathil Abdulla	IUML	UDF	67,369	Jose Baby	CPI	LDF	60,744	6,625
48	Malampuzha	V. S. Achuthanandan	CPI(M)	LDF	53,661	Satheesan Pacheni	INC	UDF	48,958	4,703
49	Palghat	K. Sankara Narayanan	INC	UDF	53,831	T. K. Noushad	CPI(M)	LDF	43,026	10,805
50	Chittur	K. Achuthan Chalakalam	INC	UDF	59,512	K. Krishnankutty Ezhuthanikalam	JD(S)	LDF	45,703	13,809
51	Kollengode	K. A. Chandran	INC	UDF	56,927	R. Chinnakuttan	CPI(M)	LDF	49,533	7,394
52	Coyalmannam (SC)	A. K. Balan	CPI(M)	LDF	52,842	C. Prakash	INC	UDF	48,811	4,031
53	Alathur	V. Chenthamarakshan	CPI(M)	LDF	59,485	R. Chellamma Teacher	INC	UDF	46,980	12,505
Thrissur district
54	Chelakara (SC)	K. Radhakrishnan	CPI(M)	LDF	56,451	K. A. Thulasi	INC	UDF	54,976	1,475
55	Wadakkancherry	Adv. V. Balaram	INC	UDF	59,415	M. P. Pauly	KC	LDF	50,384	9,031
56	Kunnamkulam	T. V. Chandramohan	INC	UDF	59,679	Usha Teacher	CPI(M)	LDF	55,383	4,296
57	Cherpu	Adv. K. P. Rajendran	CPI	LDF	51,995	M. K. Kannan	Ind.	UDF	49,752	2,243
58	Trichur	Adv. Therambil Ramakrishnan	INC	UDF	54,424	K. P. Aravindakshan	CPI(M)	LDF	40,718	13,706
59	Ollur	P. P. George	INC	UDF	66,100	C. N. Jayadevan	CPI	LDF	55,402	10,698
60	Kodakara	K. P. Viswanathan	INC	UDF	57,923	Lonappan Nambadan	Ind.	LDF	50,591	7,332
61	Chalakudi	Prof. Savithri Lakshmanan	INC	UDF	51,606	M. A. Paulose	JD(S)	LDF	40,944	10,662
62	Mala	T. U. Radhakrishnan	INC	UDF	57,976	U. S. Sasi	CPI	LDF	45,995	11,981
63	Irinjalakuda	Thomas Unniyadan	KC(M)	UDF	54,242	T. Sasidharan	CPI(M)	LDF	53,836	406
64	Manalur	M. K. Paulson Master	INC	UDF	50,283	N. R. Balan	CPI(M)	LDF	44,041	6,242
65	Guruvayoor	P. K. K. Bhava	IUML	UDF	52,487	P. T. Kunju Muhammad	Ind.	LDF	42,961	9,526
66	Nattika	T. N. Prathapan	INC	UDF	56,517	Krishnan Kaniyamparambil	CPI	LDF	44,770	11,747
67	Kodungallur	Umesh Challiyil	JSS	UDF	59,369	Prof. Meenakshi Thampan	CPI	LDF	47,428	11,941
Ernakulam district
68	Ankamali	P. J. Joy	INC	UDF	68,300	Prof. V. J. Pappu	Ind.	LDF	50,123	18,177
69	Vadakkekara	M. A. Chndrasekharan	INC	UDF	53,959	Adv. P. Rajeev	CPI(M)	LDF	52,039	1,920
70	Parur	Adv. V. D. Satheesan	INC	UDF	48,859	P. Raju	CPI	LDF	41,425	7,434
71	Narakal (SC)	Dr. Ma Kuttappan	INC	UDF	49,557	Mk Purushothaman	CPI(M)	LDF	45,343	4,214
72	Ernakulam	Prof. K. V. Thomas	INC	UDF	51,265	Sebastian Paul	Ind.	LDF	39,421	11,844
73	Mattancherry	V. K. Ebrahim Kunju	IUML	UDF	34,660	Ma Thomas	Ind.	LDF	22,507	12,153
74	Palluruthy	Dominic Presentation	INC	UDF	66,601	Tp Peethambaran Master	NCP	LDF	56,618	9,983
75	Trippunithura	K. Babu	INC	UDF	81,590	K. Chandran Pillai	CPI(M)	LDF	57,294	24,296
76	Alwaye	K. Muhammod Ali	INC	UDF	68,863	Adv. K. K. Sajitha	Ind.	LDF	49,183	19,680
77	Perumbavoor	Saju Paul	CPI(M)	LDF	58,602	P. P. Thankachan	INC	UDF	57,414	1,188
78	Kunnathunad	Musthafa T. H.	INC	UDF	69,220	M. P. Varghese	CPI(M)	LDF	47,463	21,757
79	Piravom	T. M. Jacob	KC(J)	UDF	63,791	Gopi Kottamurikal	CPI(M)	LDF	51,071	12,720
80	Muvattupuzha	Johny Nelloor	KC(J)	UDF	54,031	George Kunnappilly	CPI	LDF	45,138	8,893
81	Kothamangalam	V. J. Poulose	INC	UDF	58,389	Prof. Baby M. Varghese	KC	LDF	45,966	12,423
Idukki district
82	Thodupuzha	P. T. Thomas	INC	UDF	67,428	P. J. Joseph	KC	LDF	61,303	6,125
83	Devicolam (SC)	A. K. Moni	INC	UDF	55,287	K. Balasubrahmanian	CPI(M)	LDF	50,721	4,566
84	Idukki	Roshy Augustine	KC(M)	UDF	47,092	M. S. Joseph	Ind.	LDF	33,373	13,719
85	Udumbanchola	K. K. Jayachandran	CPI(M)	LDF	64,493	Mathew Stephan	Ind.	UDF	55,652	8,841
86	Peermade	Adv. E. M. Augasthy	INC	UDF	48,798	C. A. Kurian	CPI	LDF	45,714	3,084
Kottayam district
87	Kanjirappally	George J. Mathew	INC	UDF	40,486	Adv. Shanavas	CPI(M)	LDF	39,017	1,469
88	Vazhoor	K. Narayanakupup	KC(M)	UDF	43,820	Prof. A. N. Thulasidas	CPI	LDF	37,661	6,159
89	Changanacherry	C. F. Thomas	KC(M)	UDF	53,824	Prof. James Manimala	Ind.	LDF	40,783	13,041
90	Kottayam	Mercy Ravi	INC	UDF	57,795	Vaikom Viswan	CPI(M)	LDF	45,954	11,841
91	Ettumanoor	Thomas Chazhikadan	KC(M)	UDF	59,525	Thambippodippara	CPI(M)	LDF	39,381	20,144
92	Puthuppally	Oommen Chandy	INC	UDF	58,531	Cherian Philip	Ind.	Ind.	45,956	12,575
93	Poonjar	P. C. George Plathottom	KC	LDF	48,499	Adv. T. V. Abraham	KC(M)	UDF	46,605	1,894
94	Palai	K. M. Mani	KC(M)	UDF	52,838	Uzhavoor Vijayan	NCP	LDF	30,537	22,301
95	Kaduthuruthy	Stephen George	KC(M)	UDF	50,055	Adv. Mons Joseph	KC	LDF	45,406	4,649
96	Vaikom (SC)	P. Narayanan	CPI	LDF	54,675	K. V. Padmanabhan	INC	UDF	46,922	7,753
Alappuzha district
97	Aroor	K. R. Gowriamma	JSS	UDF	61,073	K. V. Devadas	CPI(M)	LDF	48,731	12,342
98	Sherthalai	A. K. Antony	INC	UDF	59,661	C. K. Chandrappan	CPI	LDF	52,801	6,860
99	Mararikulam	Dr. Thomas Issac	CPI(M)	LDF	75,476	Adv. P. J. Francis	INC	UDF	67,073	8,403
100	Alleppey	K. C. Venugopal	INC	UDF	52,203	Adv. A. M. Abdulraheem	Ind.	LDF	33,050	19,153
101	Ambalapuzha	D. Sugathan	INC	UDF	53,119	C. K. Sadasivan	CPI(M)	LDF	48,602	4,517
102	Kuttanad	Dr. K. C. Joseph	KC	LDF	44,534	Prof. Oommen Mathew	KC(J)	UDF	34,144	10,390
103	Haripad	T. K. Devakumar	CPI(M)	LDF	59,439	Prof. A. V. Thamarakshan	RSP(B)	UDF	55,252	4,187
104	Kayamkulam	M. M. Hassan	INC	UDF	52,444	G. Sudhakaran	CPI(M)	LDF	50,680	1,764
Pathanamthitta district
105	Thiruvalla	Adv. Mammen Mathai	KC(M)	UDF	42,397	Dr. Varghese George	JD(S)	LDF	32,336	10,061
106	Kallooppara	Joseph M. Puthussery	KC(M)	UDF	42,238	Adv. T. S. John	KC	LDF	31,013	11,225
107	Aranmula	Malethu Saraladevi	INC	UDF	37,025	A. Padmakumar	CPI(M)	LDF	32,900	4,125
Alappuzha district
108	Chengannur	Sobhana George	INC	UDF	41,242	Adv. K. K. Ramachandran Nair	CPI(M)	LDF	39,777	1,465
109	Mavelikara	M. Murali	INC	UDF	56,402	N. V. Pradeepkumar	NCP	LDF	45,419	10,983
Pathanamthitta district
110	Pandalam (SC)	K. K. Shaju	JSS	UDF	55,043	K. L. Bindhu	CPI(M)	LDF	50,881	4,162
111	Ranni	Raju Abraham	CPI(M)	LDF	48,286	Bijili Panaveli	INC	UDF	43,479	4,807
112	Pathanamthitta	K. K. Nair	INC	UDF	43,776	Jerry Easo Oommen	KC	LDF	37,228	6,548
113	Konni	Adv. Adoor Prakash	INC	UDF	54,312	Kadamminitta Ramakrishnan	Ind.	LDF	40,262	14,050
Kollam district
114	Pathanapuram	K. B. Ganesh Kumar	KC(B)	UDF	58,224	Adv. K. Prakash Babu	CPI	LDF	48,293	9,931
115	Punaloor	P. S. Supal	CPI	LDF	57,065	A. Hidur Muhammod	INC	UDF	55,522	1,543
116	Chadayamangalam	Prayar Gopalakrishnan	INC	UDF	49,683	R. Lathadevi	CPI	LDF	47,764	1,919
117	Kottarakara	R. Balakrishna Pillai	KC(B)	UDF	55,691	Adv. V. Raveendran Nair	CPI(M)	LDF	42,723	12,968
118	Neduvathur (SC)	Ezhukone Narayanan	INC	UDF	53,579	Adv. K. Somaprasad	CPI(M)	LDF	48,952	4,627
119	Adoor	Thiruvanchoor Radhakrishnan	INC	UDF	53,034	Pallickal Prasannakumar	Ind.	LDF	37,694	15,340
120	Kunnathur (SC)	Kovoor Kunjumon	RSP	LDF	60,827	Pandalam Sudhakaran	INC	UDF	57,341	3,486
121	Karunagapally	Adv. A. N. Rajan Babu	JSS	UDF	53,206	K. C. Pillai	CPI	LDF	52,367	839
122	Chavara	Shibu Baby John	RSP(B)	UDF	60,689	V. P. Ramakrishna Pillai	RSP	LDF	48,206	12,483
123	Kundara	Kadavoor Sivadasan	INC	UDF	50,875	Mercykutty Amma	CPI(M)	LDF	46,408	4,467
124	Quilon	Babu Divakaran	RSP(B)	UDF	50,780	Prof. Kallada Vjayam	RSP	LDF	38,505	12,275
125	Eravipuram	A. A. Azeez	RSP	LDF	55,638	T. A. Ahamed Kabeer	IUML	UDF	55,617	21
126	Chathanoor	G. Prathapavarma Thampan	INC	UDF	53,304	N. Anirudhan	CPI	LDF	52,757	547
Thiruvananthapuram district
127	Varkala	Varkala Kahar	INC	UDF	45,315	P. K. Gurudasan	CPI(M)	LDF	43,327	1,988
128	Attingal	Vakkom Purushothaman	INC	UDF	51,139	Kadakampally Surendran	CPI(M)	LDF	40,323	10,816
129	Kilimanoor (SC)	N. Rajan	CPI	LDF	52,012	K. Chandrababu	RSP(B)	UDF	48,841	3,171
130	Vamanapuram	Pirappankodeu Murali	CPI(M)	LDF	52,749	Adv. S. Shine	JSS	UDF	51,140	1,609
131	Ariyanad	G. Karthikeyan	INC	UDF	54,489	G. Arjunan	RSP	LDF	42,418	12,071
132	Nedumangad	Mankode Radhakrishnan	CPI	LDF	62,270	Palode Ravi	INC	UDF	62,114	156
133	Kazhakuttam	Adv. M. A. Vahid	Ind.	UDF	49,917	Adv. Bindu Ummar	CPI(M)	LDF	45,624	4,293
134	Trivandrum North	Adv K. Mohankumar	INC	UDF	63,202	M. Vijayakumar	CPI(M)	LDF	56,818	6,384
135	Trivandrum West	M. V. Raghavan	CMP	UDF	48,912	Adv Antony Raju	KC	LDF	40,531	8,381
136	Trivandrum East	B. Vijayakumar	INC	UDF	43,419	Karakulam Krishna Pillai	NCP	LDF	29,351	14,068
137	Nemom	N. Sakthan	INC	UDF	56,648	Venganoor P. Bhaskaran	CPI(M)	LDF	47,291	9,357
138	Kovalam	Dr. A. Neelalohithadasan Nadar	JD(S)	LDF	54,110	Adv. Alphonsa John	INC	UDF	52,065	2,045
139	Neyyattinkara	Thampanoor Ravi	INC	UDF	56,305	Adv. S. B. Rosechandran	JD(S)	LDF	49,830	6,475
140	Parassala	N. Sundaran Nadar	INC	UDF	55,915	R. Selvaraj	CPI(M)	LDF	44,365	11,550
