= 11th Kerala Assembly =

2001–2006 Kerala Assembly term

←	10th	12th	→

Overview
- Legislative body: Kerala Legislative Assembly
- Term: 17 May 2001 – 12 May 2006
- Election: 2001 Kerala Legislative Assembly election
- Government: Third Antony ministry (until 2004); First Oommen ministry (2004 to 2006)
- Opposition: LDF
- Members: 140
- Speaker: Vakkom Purushothaman (until 2004); Therambil Ramakrishnan (2004 to 2006)
- Deputy Speaker: N. Sundaran Nadar
- Leader of the House: A. K. Antony (until 2004); Oommen Chandy (2004 to 2006)
- Leader of the Opposition: V. S. Achuthanandan
- Deputy Leader of the Opposition: Kodiyeri Balakrishnan
- Party control: UDF

The 11th Assembly of Kerala was elected in the 2001 Kerala Legislative Assembly election. The Speaker of the assembly was Vakkom Purushothaman until 2004 after which Therambil Ramakrishnan succeeded him till the end of the term. The Deputy Speaker was N. Sundaran Nadar from the Indian National Congress. The leader of the Assembly was A. K. Antony until 2004 after which Oommen Chandy succeeded him until the end of the term. The leader of opposition was V. S. Achuthanandan and the deputy leader of opposition was Kodiyeri Balakrishnan both of the Communist Party of India (Marxist).

== Members ==
Sl. No:	Constituency	Name	Party
1	Manjeshwar	Cherkalam Abdullah	IUML
2	Kasaragod	C. T. Ahammed Ali	IUML
3	Udma	K. V. Kunhiraman	CPI(M)
4	Hosdrug (SC)	M. Kumaran	CPI
5	Trikkarpur	Satheesh Chandran K. P.	
6	Irikkur	K. C. Joseph	
7	Payyanur	P. K. Sreemathi	
8	Taliparamba	M. V. Govindan	
9	Azhikode	T. K. Balan	
10	Cannanore	K. Sudhakaran	
11	Edakkad	M. V. Jayarajan	
12	Tellicherry	Kodiyeri Balakrishnan	
13	Peringalam	K. P. Mohanan	
14	Kuthuparamba	P. Jayarajan	
15	Peravoor	A. D. Mustaffa	
16	North Wynad (ST)	Radha Raghavan	
17	Badagara	C. K. Nanu	
18	Nadapuram	Binoy Viswam	
19	Meppayur	Mathai Chacko	
20	Quilandy	P. Sankaran	
21	Perambra	T. P. Ramakrishnan	
22	Balusseri	A. C. Shanmukhadas	
23	Koduvally	C. Mammutty	
24	Calicut-I	A. Sujanapal	
25	Calicut-II	T. P. M. Zahir	
26	Beypore	V. K. C. Mammed Koya	
27	Kunnamangalam (SC)	U. C. Raman	
28	Thiruvambady	C. Moinkutty	
29	Kalpetta	K. K. Ramachandran	
30	Sulthan Bathery	N. D. Appachan	
31	Wandoor (SC)	A. P. Anilkumar	
32	Nilambur	Aryadan Muhammed	
33	Manjeri	Ishaque Kurikkal	
34	Malappuram	M. K. Muneer	
35	Kondotty	K. N. A. Kader	
36	Tirurangadi	K. Kutty Ahammed Kutty	
37	Tanur	P. K. Abdu Rabb	
38	Tirur	E. T. Mohammed Basheer	
39	Ponnani	M. P. Gangadharan	
40	Kuttipuram	P. K. Kunhalikutty	
41	Mankada	Manjalamkuzhi Ali	
42	Perinthalmanna	Nalakath Soopy	
43	Thrithala	V. K. Chandran	
44	Pattambi	C. P. Mohammed	
45	Ottapalam	V. C. Kabeer Master	
46	Sreekrishnapuram	Girija Surendran	
47	Mannarkkad	Kalathil Abdulla	
48	Malampuzha	V. S. Achuthanandan	
49	Palghat	K. Sankara Narayanan	
50	Chittur	K. Achuthan Chalakalam	
51	Kollengode	K. A. Chandran	
52	Coyalmannam (SC)	A. K. Balan	
53	Alathur	V. Chenthamarakshan	
54	Chelakkara	K. Radhakrishnan	
55	Wadakkanchery	V. Balram	
56	Kunnamkulam	T. V. Chandramohan	
57	Cherpu	K. P. Rajendran	
58	Trichur	Therambil Ramakrishnan	
59	Ollur	P. P. George	
60	Kodakara	K. P. Viswanathan	
61	Chalakudy	Savithri Lakshmanan	
62	Mala	T. U. Radhakrishnan	
63	Irinjalakuda	Thomas Unniyadan	
64	Manalur	M. K. Paulson Master	
65	Guruvayoor	P. K. K. Bhava	
66	Nattika	T. N. Prathapan	
67	Kodungallur	Umesh Challiyil	
68	Angamaly	P. J. Joy	
69	Vadakkekara	M. A. Chndrasekharan	
70	Parur	V. D. Satheesan	
71	Narakal (SC)	Ma Kuttappan	
72	Ernakulam	K. V. Thomas	
73	Mattancherry	V. K. Ebrahim Kunju	
74	Palluruthy	Dominic Presentation	
75	Trippunithura	K. Babu	
76	Alwaye	K. Muhammod Ali	
77	Perumbavoor	Saju Paul	
78	Kunnathunad	Musthafa T. H.	
79	Piravom	T. M. Jacob	
80	Muvattupuzha	Johny Nelloor	
81	Kothamangalam	V. J. Poulose	
82	Thodupuzha	P. T. Thomas	
83	Devikulam	A. K. Moni	
84	Idukki	Roshy Augustine	
88	Udumbanchola	K. K. Jayachandran	
86	Peerumade	E. M. Augasthy	
87	Kanjirappally	George J. Mathew	
88	Vazhoor	K. Narayanakupup	
89	Changanassery	C. F. Thomas	
90	Kottayam	Mercy Ravi	
91	Ettumanoor	Thomas Chazhikadan	
92	Puthuppally	Oommen Chandy	
93	Poonjar	P. C. George Plathottom	
94	Pala	K. M. Mani	
95	Kaduthuruthy	Stephen George	
96	Vaikom		
97	Aroor	K. R. Gowriamma	
98	Shertalai	A. K. Antony	
99	Mararikulam	Thomas Issac	
100	Alleppey	K. C. Venugopal	
101	Ambalappuzha	D. Sugathan	
102	Kuttanad	K. C. Joseph	
103	Haripad	T. K. Devakumar	
104	Kayamkulam	M. M. Hassan	
105	Thiruvalla	Mammen Mathai	
106	Kallooppara	Joseph M. Puthussery	
107	Aranmula	Malethu Saraladevi	
108	Chengannur	Sobhana George	
109	Mavelikara	M. Murali	
110	Pandalam (SC)	K. K. Shaju	
111	Ranni	Raju Abraham	
112	Pathanamthitta	K. K. Nair	
113	Konni	Adoor Prakash	
114	Pathanapuram	K. B. Ganesh Kumar	
115	Punalur	P. S. Supal	
116	Chadayamangalam	Prayar Gopalakrishnan	
117	Kottarakkara	R. Balakrishna Pillai	
118	Neduvathur (SC)	Ezhukone Narayanan	
119	Adoor	Thiruvanchoor Radhakrishnan	
120	Kunnathur	Kovoor Kunjumon	
121	Karunagappally	A. N. Rajan Babu	
122	Chavara	Shibu Baby John	
123	Kundara	Kadavoor Sivadasan	
124	Quilon	Babu Divakaran	
125	Eravipuram	A. A. Azeez	
126	Chathannoor	G. Prathapavarma Thampan	
127	Varkala	Varkala Kahar	
128	Attingal	Vakkom Purushothaman	
129	Kilimanoor (SC)	N. Rajan	
130	Vamanapuram	Pirappankodeu Murali	
131	Ariyanad	G. Karthikeyan	
132	Nedumangad	Mankode Radhakrishnan	
133	Kazhakuttam	M. A. Vahid	
134	Trivandrum North	K. Mohankumar	
135	Trivandrum West	M. V. Raghavan	
136	Trivandrum East	B. Vijayakumar	
137	Nemom	N. Sakthan	
138	Kovalam	A. Neelalohithadasan Nadar	
139	Neyyattinkara	Thampanoor Ravi	
140	Parassala	N. Sundaran Nadar	
