= 10th Kerala Assembly =

1996–2001 Kerala Assembly term

←	9th	11th	→

Overview
- Legislative body: Kerala Legislative Assembly
- Term: 20 May 1996 – 16 May 2001
- Election: 1996 Kerala Legislative Assembly election
- Government: Third Nayanar ministry
- Opposition: UDF
- Members: 140
- Speaker: M. Vijayakumar
- Deputy Speaker: C. A. Kurian
- Leader of the House: E. K. Nayanar
- Leader of the Opposition: A. K. Antony
- Party control: LDF

The 10th Assembly of Kerala was elected in the 1996 Kerala Legislative Assembly election. The Speaker of the assembly was M. Vijayakumar. The Deputy Speaker was C. A. Kurian from the Communist Party of India. The leader of the Assembly was E. K. Nayanar from the Communist Party of India (Marxist). The leader of opposition was A. K. Antony of the Indian National Congress. The Assembly had 16 sessions with 268 days of sittings. A total of 104 bills were passed during this period.

== Members ==
Sl. No:	Constituency	Name	Party
1	Manjeshwar	Cherkalam Abdullah	
2	Kasaragod	C.T Ahammed Ali	
3	Udma	P. Raghavan	
4	Hosdrug (SC)	M. Narayanan	
5	Trikkarpur	K.P. Satheesh Chandran	
6	Irikkur	K.C. Joseph	
7	Payyanur	Pinarayi Vijayan	
8	Taliparamba	M.V. Govindan	
9	Azhikode	T.K. Balan	
10	Cannanore	K. Sudhakaran	
11	Edakkad	M.V. Jayarajan	
12	Tellicherry	K.P. Mammu	
13	Peringalam	P.R. Kurup	
14	Kuthuparamba	K.K. Shylaja	
15	Peravoor	K.T. Kunnahammed	
16	North Wynad (ST)	Radha Raghavan	
17	Badagara	C.K. Nanu	
18	Nadapuram	Sathyan Mokeri	
19	Meppayur	A. Kanaran	
20	Quilandy	P. Viswan	
21	Perambra	N.K. Radha	
22	Balusseri	A.C. Shanmukhadas	
23	Koduvally	C. Moyinkutty	
24	Calicut-I	M. Dasan	
25	Calicut-II	Elamaram Kareem	
26	Beypore	T.K. Hamza	
27	Kunnamangalam (SC)	C.P. Balan Vaidyar	
28	Thiruvambady	Abdurahiman Haji A.V.	
29	Kalpetta	K.K. Ramachandran	
30	Sulthan Bathery	Varghese Vaidyar	
31	Wandoor (SC)	N. Kannan	
32	Nilambur	Aryadan Muhammad	
33	Manjeri	Ishaque Kurikkal	
34	Malappuram	M.K. Muneer	
35	Kondotty	P.K.K Bava	
36	Tirurangadi	Kutty Ahamed Kutty	
37	Tanur	Abdu Rabb	
38	Tirur	E.T. Mohamed Basheer	
39	Ponnani	Muhammedkutty Paloli	
40	Kuttipuram	P.K. Kunhalikutty	
41	Mankada	K.P. Abdul Majeed	
42	Perinthalmanna	Nalakath Soopy	
43	Thrithala	V.K Chandran	
44	Pattambi	K.E Ismail	
45	Ottapalam	V.C. Kabeer	
46	Sreekrishnapuram	Girija Surendran	
47	Mannarkkad	Jose Baby	
48	Malampuzha	T. Sivadasa Menon	
49	Palghat	T.K. Noushad	
50	Chittur	Achuthan K	
51	Kollengode	K.A. Chandran	
52	Coyalmannam (SC)	M. Narayanan	
53	Alathur	C.K. Rajendran	
54	Chelakkara (SC)	K. Radhakrishnan	
55	Wadakkanchery	V. Balaram	
56	Kunnamkulam	N.R. Balan	
57	Cherpu	K.P. Rajendran	
58	Trichur	Therambil Ramakrishnan	
59	Ollur	C.N. Jayadevan	
60	Kodakara	K.P. Viswanathan	
61	Chalakudy	Savithri Lakshmanan	
62	Mala	V.K. Balan	
63	Irinjalakuda	Lonappan Nambadan	
64	Manalur	Rosamma Chacko	
65	Guruvayoor	P.T. Kunju Muhammed	
66	Nattika	Krishnan Kaniyamparambil	
67	Kodungallur	Meenakshi Thamban	
68	Angamaly	P.J. Joy	
69	Vadakkekara	S. Sarma	
70	Parur	P. Raju	
71	Narakal (SC)	M.A. Kuttappan	
72	Ernakulam	George Eden	
73	Mattancherry	M.A. Thomas	
74	Palluruthy	Dominic Presentation	
75	Trippunithura	K. Babu	
76	Alwaye	K. Mohammedali	
77	Perumbavoor	P.P. Thankachan	
78	Kunnathunad	M.P. Vargheese	
79	Piravom	T.M. Jacob	
80	Muvattupuzha	Johny Nelloor	
81	Kothamangalam	V.J. Poulose	
82	Thodupuzha	P.J. Joseph	
83	Devicolam (SC)	A.K. Moni	
84	Idukki	P.P. Sulaiman Rawther	
88	Udumbanchola	E.M. Augusthy	
86	Peermade	C.A Kurian	
87	Kanjirappally	George J. Mathew	
88	Vazhoor	K. Narayana Kurup	
89	Changanacherry	C.F. Thomas	
90	Kottayam	T.K. Ramakrishnan	
91	Ettumanoor	Thomas Chazhikadan	
92	Puthuppally	Oommen Chandy	
93	Poonjar	P.C. George	
94	Pala	K.M. Mani	
95	Kaduthuruthy	Mons Joseph	
96	Vaikom (SC)	M.K. Kesavan	
97	Aroor	K.R. Gowri Amma	
98	Sherthalai	A.K. Antony	
99	Mararikulam	P.J. Francis	
100	Alleppey	K.C. Venugopal	
101	Ambalappuzha	Suseela Gopalan	
102	Kuttanad	K.C. Joseph	
103	Haripad	A.V. Thamarakshan	
104	Kayamkulam	G. Sudhakaran	
105	Thiruvalla	Mamman Mathai	
106	Kallooppara	T.S. John	
107	Aranmula	Kadammanitta Ramakrishnan	
108	Chengannur	Sobhana George	
109	Mavelikara	M. Murali	
110	Pandalam (SC)	P.K. Kumaran	
111	Ranni	Raju Abraham	
112	Pathanamthitta	K.K. Nair	
113	Konni	Adoor Prakash	
114	Pathanapuram	K. Prakash Babu	
115	Punaloor	P.K. Sreenivasan	
116	Chadayamangalam	R. Latha Devi	
117	Kottarakara	R. Balakrishna Pillai	
118	Neduvathur (SC)	Ezhukone Narayanan	
119	Adoor	Thiruvanchoor Radhakrishnan	
120	Kunnathur (SC)	T. Nanoo	
121	Karunagappally	E. Chandrasekharan Nair	
122	Chavara	Baby John	
123	Kundara	J. Mercykuttiamma	
124	Quilon	Babu Divakaran	
125	Eravipuram	V.P. Ramakrishna Pillai	
126	Chathannoor	P. Raveendran	
127	Varkala	A. Ali Hassan	
128	Attingal	Anathalavattom Anandan	
129	Kilimanoor (SC)	Bhargavi Thankappan	
130	Vamanapuram	Pirappancode Murali	
131	Ariyanad	G. Karthikeyan	
132	Nedumangad	Palode Ravi	
133	Kazhakoottam	K. Surendran	
134	Trivandrum North	M. Vijayakumar	
135	Trivandrum West	Antony Raju	
136	Trivandrum East	B. Vijaya Kumar	
137	Nemom	Venganoor P. Bhaskaran	
138	Kovalam	A. Neelalohithadasan N.	
139	Neyyattinkara	Thampanoor Ravi	
140	Parassala	N. Sundaran Nadar	
