= 9th Kerala Assembly =

1991–1996 Kerala Assembly term

←	8th	10th	→

Overview
- Legislative body: Kerala Legislative Assembly
- Term: 24 June 1991 – 9 May 1996
- Election: 1991 Kerala Legislative Assembly election
- Government: Fourth Karunakaran ministry (1991-1995); Second Antony ministry (1995-1996)
- Opposition: LDF
- Members: 140
- Speaker: P. P. Thankachan (1991-1995); Therambil Ramakrishnan (1995-1996)
- Deputy Speaker: K. Narayana Kurup
- Leader of the House: K. Karunakaran (1991-1995); A. K. Antony (1995-1996)
- Leader of the Opposition: E. K. Nayanar (1991-1992); V. S. Achuthanandan (1992-1996)
- Party control: UDF

The 9th Assembly of Kerala was elected in the 1991 Kerala Legislative Assembly election. The Speaker of the assembly was P. P. Thankachan until 1995 after which Therambil Ramakrishnan succeeded him. The Deputy Speaker was K. Narayana Kurup. The leader of the Assembly was K. Karunakaran from the Indian National Congress until he resigned in March 1995 due to internal party pressure by P. V. Narasimha Rao and Oommen Chandy due to the ISRO espionage case leading to his rival, A. K. Antony succeeding him. The leader of opposition was E. K. Nayanar until he resigned from the post the very next year 1992 when he was chosen as the Kerala state secretary of the CPI(M) and was succeeded by V. S. Achuthanandan of the Communist Party of India (Marxist) for the remainder of the term. The Assembly had 15 sessions with 264 days of sittings. A total of 83 bills were passed during this period.

== Members ==
Sl. No:	Constituency	Name	Party
1	Manjeshwar		
2	Kasaragod		
3	Udma		
4	Hosdrug (SC)		
5	Trikkarpur		
6	Irikkur		
7	Payyanur		
8	Taliparamba		
9	Azhikode		
10	Cannanore		
11	Edakkad		
12	Tellicherry		
13	Peringalam		
14	Kuthuparamba		
15	Peravoor		
16	North Wayanad (ST)		
17	Badagara		
18	Nadapuram		
19	Meppayur		
20	Quilandy		
21	Perambra		
22	Balusseri		
23	Koduvally		
24	Calicut-I		
25	Calicut-II		
26	Beypore		
27	Kunnamangalam (SC)		
28	Thiruvambady		
29	Kalpetta		
30	Sulthan Bathery		
31	Wandoor (SC)		
32	Nilambur		
33	Manjeri		
34	Malappuram		
35	Kondotty		
36	Tirurangadi		
37	Tanur		
38	Tirur		
39	Ponnani		
40	Kuttipuram		
41	Mankada		
42	Perinthalmanna		
43	Thrithala		
44	Pattambi		
45	Ottapalam		
46	Sreekrishnapuram		
47	Mannarkkad		
48	Malampuzha		
49	Palghat		
50	Chittur		
51	Kollengode Shornur		
52	Coyalmannam (SC)		
53	Alathur		
54	Chelakkara		
55	Wadakkanchery		
56	Kunnamkulam		
57	Cherpu		
58	Trichur		
59	Ollur		
60	Kodakara		
61	Chalakudy		
62	Mala		
63	Irinjalakuda		
64	Manalur		
65	Guruvayoor		
66	Nattika		
67	Kodungallur		
68	Angamaly		
69	Vadakkekara		
70	Parur		
71	Narakal (SC)		
72	Ernakulam		
73	Mattancherry		
74	Palluruthy		
75	Trippunithura		
76	Alwaye		
77	Perumbavoor		
78	Kunnathunad		
79	Piravom		
80	Muvattupuzha		
81	Kothamangalam		
82	Thodupuzha		
83	Devikulam		
84	Idukki		
88	Udumbanchola		
86	Peerumade		
87	Kanjirappally		
88	Vazhoor		
89	Changanassery		
90	Kottayam		
91	Ettumanoor		
92	Puthuppally		
93	Poonjar		
94	Pala		
95	Kaduthuruthy		
96	Vaikom		
97	Aroor		
98	Cherthala		
99	Mararikulam		
100	Alappuzha		
101	Ambalappuzha		
102	Kuttanad		
103	Haripad		
104	Kayamkulam		
105	Thiruvalla		
106	Kallooppara		
107	Aranmula		
108	Chengannur		
109	Mavelikara		
110	Pandalam (SC)		
111	Ranni		
112	Pathanamthitta		
113	Konni		
114	Pathanapuram		
115	Punalur		
116	Chadayamangalam		
117	Kottarakkara		
118	Neduvathur (SC)		
119	Adoor		
120	Kunnathur		
121	Karunagappally		
122	Chavara		
123	Kundara		
124	Kollam		
125	Eravipuram		
126	Chathannoor		
127	Varkala		
128	Attingal		
129	Kilimanoor (SC)		
130	Vamanapuram		
131	Ariyanad		
132	Nedumangad		
133	Kazhakoottam		
134	Trivandrum North		
135	Trivandrum West		
136	Trivandrum East		
137	Nemom		
138	Kovalam		
139	Neyyattinkara		
140	Parassala		
