= Cherian Philip =

Indian politician

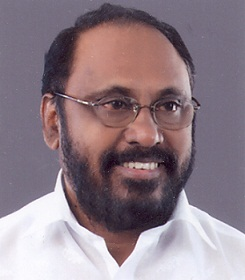

Coordinator, Nava Kerala Action plan and Kerala Tourism development Corporation KTDC Director 2006 to 2009 2016 to 2019 Government of Kerala

Personal details
- Born: Chengannur, State of Travancore–Cochin (present day Alappuzha, Kerala), India
- Party: indian National Congress
- Other political affiliations: Indian National Congress (1969-2001,2021-present) Left Fellow Traveler 2001 to 2021
- Education: Mar Ivanios College, Thiruvananthapuram; University College Thiruvananthapuram; Government Law College, Thiruvananthapuram
- Occupation: Consultant, Kairali TV 2013 2016
- Website: cherianphilip.org

Cherian Philip is an Indian politician and is KPCC political study centre chairman member, KPCC political affairs committee member, and AICC member. He was the Coordinator of Nava Kerala Action Plan, which is an initiative of the Pinarayi Vijayan-led Government of Kerala. He was the Secretary of Kerala Pradesh Congress Committee while A. K. Antony was in presidency. He was a prominent youth and student leader of the Indian National Congress in seventies and eighties. A political historian of Kerala and India, he has authored several books. He worked as a consultant for Kairali TV and People TV (now Kairali News). He was the Chairman of Kerala Tourism Development Corporation (KTDC) and founder president of Kerala Deshiya Vedhi - a social organisation. He returned to Congress(I) on 28 October 2021.

== Early life ==
Cherian Philip was born in Aratupuzha, Chengannur, as the elder son of K. C. Philip, Kadavana sub family of Pakalomattom Ayrookuzhiyil, a prominent Saint Thomas Christian family of Kerala.

He studied at St. Joseph's Higher Secondary School, Thiruvananthapuram, Mar Ivanios College, Thiruvananthapuram, University College Thiruvananthapuram and Government Law College, Thiruvananthapuram.

== Political career ==
Cherian Philip entered politics through Kerala Students Union (KSU) in 1967 as school unit President while Oommen Chandy was its president. He was elected as the Secretary of the Kerala University Union and Senate Member of Kerala University in 1974. He became the General Secretary of KSU in 1975 and its President in 1979–80. From 1980 onwards, he was the Vice President of Kerala Pradesh Youth Congress and from 1982 to 1989, was the General Secretary of Youth Congress. During the period 1984–89, he was the member of Indian Youth Congress National Council. Then became the Secretary of Kerala Pradesh Congress Committee (KPCC). In 1992, he constituted a new social organization named Kerala Desiya Vedhi in his Presidency. Until 2001, he was in the Indian National Congress and later quit Congress. He contested against Oommen Chandy. as a protest against power monopoly in the Congress. His demand was not to give tickets to MLA's completed two terms or 10 years. But the Congress leadership denied it.

In the 1991 Kerala Legislative Assembly election, he contested as Congress candidate but lost to T. K. Ramakrishnan of the Communist Party of India (Marxist) in Kottayam constituency by a mere 2682 votes.

In the 2001 Kerala Legislative Assembly election, he contested as an Independent candidate supported by LDF against Oommen Chandy at Puthuppally constituency.

In the 2006 Kerala Legislative Assembly election, he contested against Joseph M. Puthussery in Kallooppara constituency and in 2011 contested against K. Muraleedharan in Vattiyoorkavu constituency.

He anchored and produced social critical weekly programme Cherian Philip Pratikarikkunnu on Kairali TV for 10 years from 2001 to 2006 and 2011–16 which ran about 500 episodes.

He was the Chairman of Kerala Tourism Development Corporation (KTDC). International Marina (Kochi), Kerala House (Chennai), GV Raja Convention Centre (Kovalam), Beach Camp (Bekal), Golden Peak Resorts (Ponmudi) and 14 Tamarind Hotel during his tenure.

He worked as the consultant for Kairali TV and People TV (now Kairali News). He is the author of seven books: Kaal Noottandu (Political History of Kerala), Swathanthryathinu Shesham (Political History of India), Vidyabhyasa Viplavam (an educational study), Azhimathiyude Kara (a social criticism), Gulfile Keralam (a Lifestyle study), Nethrunira (Life sketches of 200 Kerala politicians), Rashtriya Vijnjanam (political theory), Idanazhikalil (Autobiography).

Cherian Philip received several awards from the Government of Kerala and social organizations for his books and TV programmes. H was editor of Kalashala fortnightly official organ of KSU (1974–80). Was the political correspondent of Veekshanam daily (1976–82). He was the editor of Socialist Youth Monthly, the official organ of Youth Congress from 1980 to 1987 and also the convenor of YuvaPratibha, a cultural organization. He attended World Youth Festivals in Moscow (1984), Korea (1989). He visited more than 30 countries in the world. He returned to Congress(I) on 28 October 2021.
