= B. Ravi Pillai =

Indian billionaire businessman

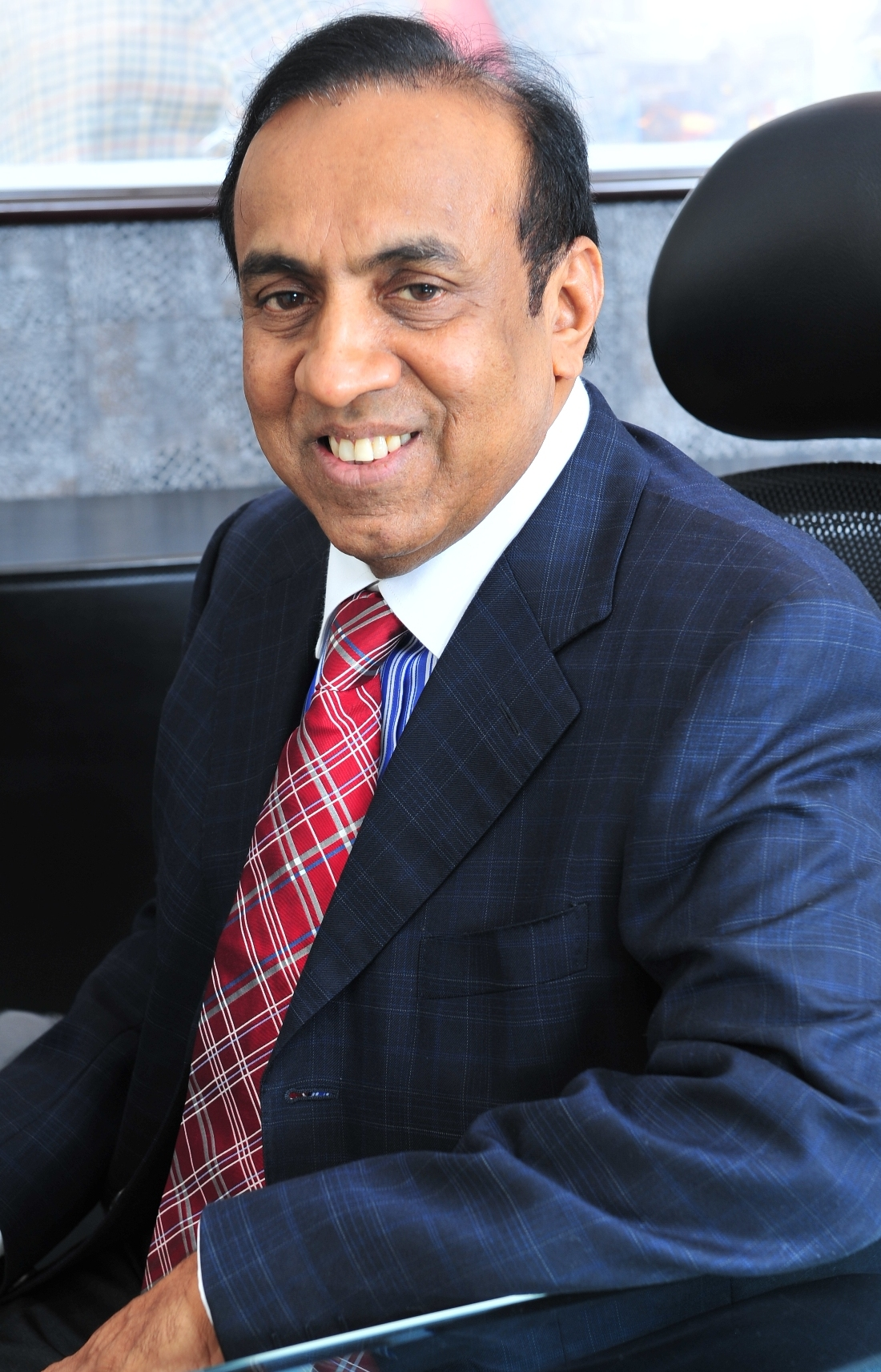
- Born: 2 September 1953 (age 72); Chavara, State of Travancore–Cochin (present-day Kollam, Kerala), India
- Education: University of Cochin
- Occupations: Founder, Chairman, RP Group
- Spouse: Geetha Pillai
- Children: 2
- Relatives: Kollam K. Chandrasekhara Pillai (uncle)

B. Ravi Pillai (born 2 September 1953) is a Dubai-based Indian billionaire businessman. He is the founder and chairman of the RP Group. As of 2026, his net worth is estimated at US$4.2 billion.

== Early life ==
Ravi Pillai was born on 2 September 1953 at Chavara, a coastal town in Kollam, in the state of Kerala in Kadappa Pillai Veettil family.

He comes from a landlord background and once and still a well-established community. However, they lost their influence in the 20th century, after independence and the rise of communist movements. By the time of his father, they were middle class, with only some agricultural land remaining. He rose from a middle-class family to become extremely wealthy with his own hardwork.

He has a degree in Commerce from the University of Cochin.

== Career ==
During his time at university, he launched his first business, a chit fund in Kollam on reportedly borrowed money. Later, he started an engineering contract business and worked for some of the major industrial houses in Kerala such as Fertilisers and Chemicals Travancore Limited, Hindustan Newsprint Limited, and Cochin Refineries. However, a labour strike forced him to close down his business, after which he went to Saudi Arabia in 1978 where he started a small trading business. Two years later, he moved into construction, and established Nasser S. Al Hajri Corporation (NSH) with 150 employees, which has over the years grown to become the flagship company of his business group, RP Group, which is known to employ over 70,000 employees across its businesses. The shopping mall in South Kerala, RP Mall at Kollam city is owned by Pillai.

Pillai has expanded his business to other countries including the United Arab Emirates, Qatar, and Bahrain, and has interests in construction, hospitality, steel, cement, and oil and gas industries. RP Group is known to hold stakes in hotels such as Leela Kovalam, Hotel Raviz, Kollam, and WelcomHotel Raviz Kadavu, Kozhikode in his home state of Kerala. He is involved in health care through Upasana Hospital and Research Centre, a 300-bed multispecialty hospital in Kollam.

== Awards and recognition ==
Pillai received an honorary doctorate from Excelsior College, New York, and was awarded the Pravasi Bharatiya Samman by the Government of India in 2008. In 2010, the Government of India included him in the Republic Day honours list for the civilian honour of Padma Shri.

Arabian Business ranked him as the fourth most powerful Indian in the Middle East in 2015.

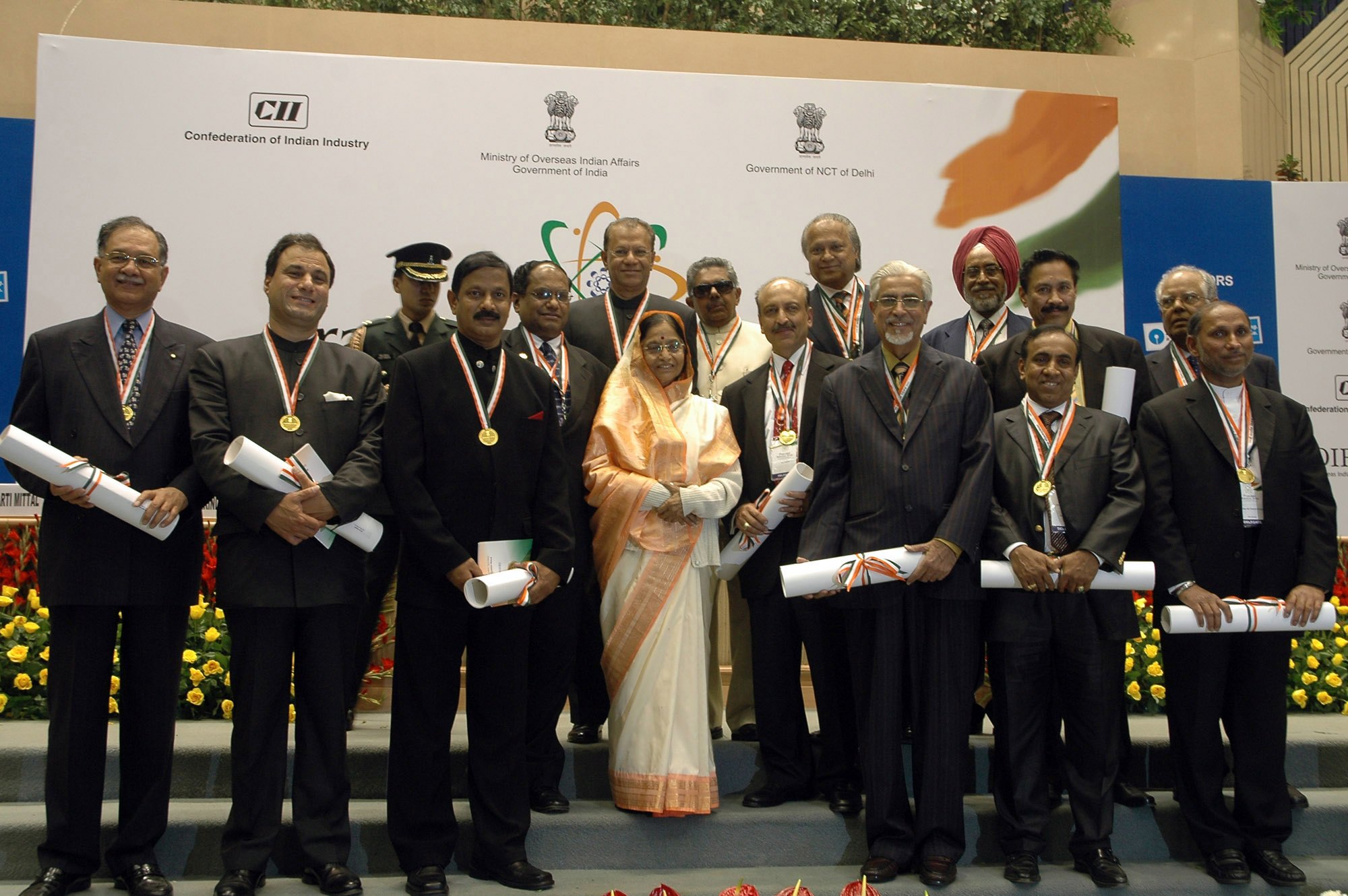
Pillai (2nd from right at front row), other awardees stand with the President of India after receiving Pravasi Bharatiya Samman

== Personal life ==
Ravi Pillai is married to Geetha, and they live in Dubai, United Arab Emirates. They have two children, a son Ganesh Ravi Pillai, and a daughter Arathi Ravi Pillai.

He paid for his daughter Arathi's wedding with Adithya Vishnu at Kollam in November 2015, at a total expense of ₹55 crores ($7.5 million), in accordance with Nair customs and cultural traditions. The wedding was organized by the production designer who worked on the film, Baahubali: The Beginning, and is considered the most expensive wedding in Kerala to date. His son Ganesh Pillai married Anjana Suresh, an engineer, in September 2021.
