= P. J. Francis =

Indian politician and lawyer from Kerala (1937–2025)

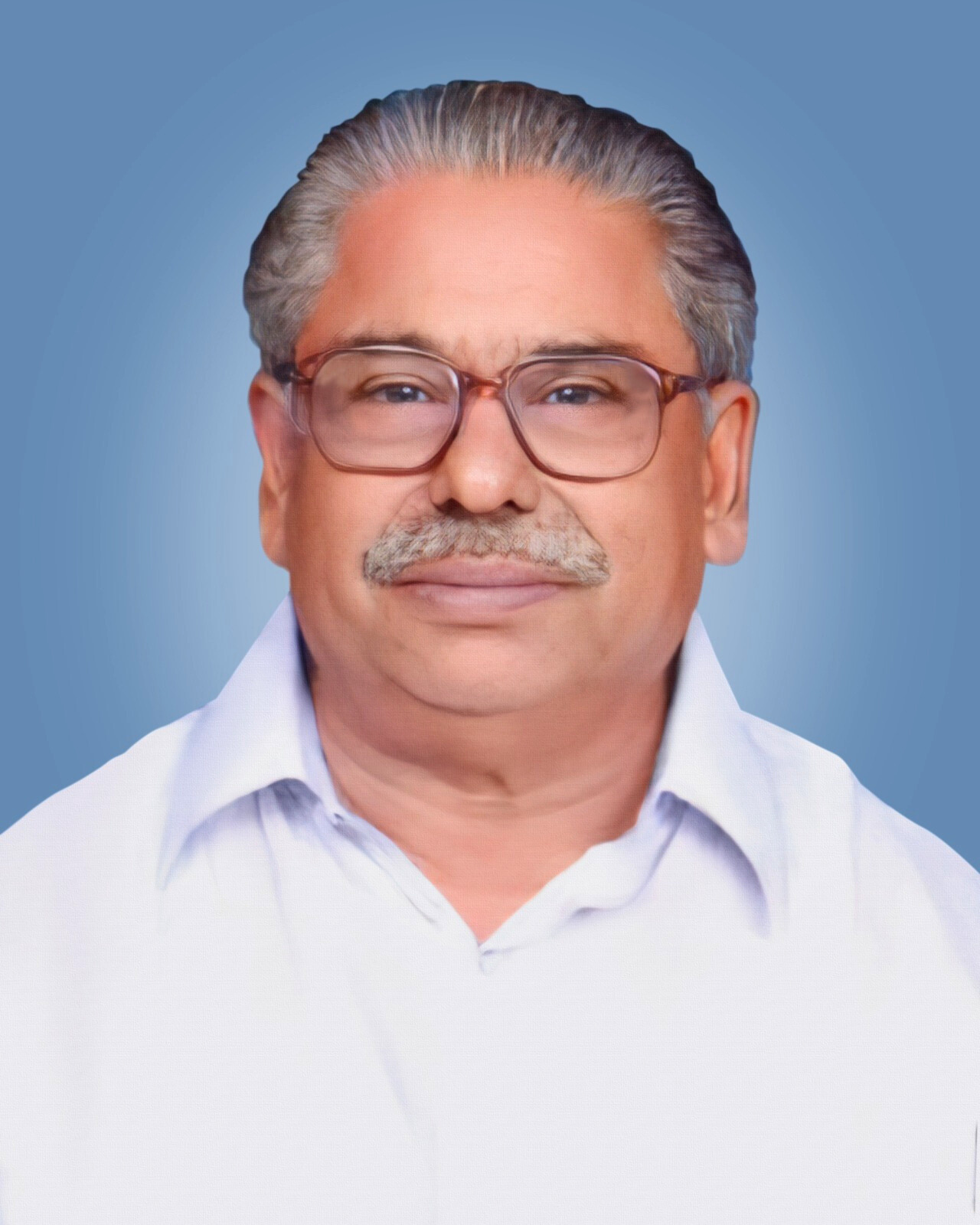
- Advocate P. J. Francis, former Member of the Legislative Assembly (MLA) for Mararikulam

Member of the Kerala Legislative Assembly
- In office 12 May 1996 – 13 May 2001
- Preceded by: V. S. Achuthanandan
- Succeeded by: T. M. Thomas Isaac
- Constituency: Mararikulam

Personal details
- Born: February 19, 1937 Alappuzha, Kerala, India
- Died: June 18, 2025 (aged 88) Kerala, India
- Party: Indian National Congress
- Spouse: Prof. V. P. Mariamma
- Education: Government Law College, Ernakulam
- Occupation: Lawyer, Politician, Author

P. J. Francis (19 February 1937 – 18 June 2025) was an Indian politician, lawyer, and author from Kerala. A member of the Indian National Congress, he represented the Mararikulam constituency in the Kerala Legislative Assembly from 1996 to 2001. He is noted for defeating V. S. Achuthanandan in the 1996 state elections.

== Political career ==
The 1996 election result is cited in political analysis as a significant event in Kerala's electoral history. A 2021 retrospective by The Hindu examined the impact of the election, noting that the victory was a rare instance of a senior leader being unseated in a stronghold, which led to the enduring 'giant-killer' characterization of Francis's political career.

In the 1987 Kerala Legislative Assembly election and 1991 elections, Francis contested the Aroor seat against K. R. Gouri Amma, losing on both occasions.

=== 1996 election ===
In the 1996 Kerala Legislative Assembly election, Francis was the Indian National Congress candidate for the Mararikulam constituency. He contested against V. S. Achuthanandan, a senior leader of the Communist Party of India (Marxist). Francis won the election by a margin of 1,965 votes. The result was reported as a major upset in a constituency considered a Communist stronghold; as a result, Francis was frequently described in the media as a "giant-killer."

== Legal challenges ==
Following the 1996 election, V. S. Achuthanandan challenged the result in the High Court of Kerala, alleging irregularities in the counting process. The petition was initially dismissed in January 1997, but the matter was appealed to the Supreme Court of India. In a 1999 ruling, the Supreme Court remitted the case back to the High Court for a full trial on its merits.

Following the trial, the High Court again dismissed the petition. This final dismissal was upheld by the Supreme Court on 31 January 2001. A three-judge bench comprising Justices S. S. M. Quadri, S. N. Phukan, and Y. K. Sabharwal ruled that the appellant failed to provide sufficient evidence to warrant a re-count, thereby confirming the validity of Francis's election.

The litigation following the 1996 election resulted in multiple rulings by the Supreme Court of India. These cases (3 SCC 737 and 2 SCC 337) are recorded in legal reporters as significant precedents regarding the evidentiary requirements for election petitions and the finality of democratic mandates

== Later life and retirement ==
Francis served as a member of the Legislative Assembly until 2001. In the 2001 Kerala Legislative Assembly election, he contested again from Mararikulam but was defeated by T. M. Thomas Isaac of the Communist Party of India (Marxist). Following this, he retired from active electoral politics and focused on his literary pursuits, authoring historical and linguistic studies regarding the region.

In his later years, he authored works on the history of Alappuzha and the evolution of the Malayalam language. His notable publications include Pathiri Malayalam: Oru Punarvichinthanam (2006), a linguistic study of the dialect used by Christian missionaries in Kerala.

== Published works ==
Francis authored several works in Malayalam, primarily concerning regional history and linguistics:

- Pathiri Malayalam: Oru Punarvichinthanam [Priestly Malayalam: A Rethinking] (in Malayalam). Kottayam: Current Books. 2006.
- Alappuzha Jillayude Charithra Smaranakal [Historical Memoirs of Alappuzha District] (in Malayalam). Kottayam: Current Books. 2007.
- Fr Paul Arackal – Meenpiduthakaarude Udhaapakan (in Malayalam). Alappuzha: Communications & Mass Media, Diocese of Alleppey. 2009.
- Alappuzha: Kizhakkinte Venice [Alappuzha: Venice of the East] (in Malayalam). Kozhikode: Mathrubhumi Books. 2011. ISBN 978-81-8267-797-5.
