= St. Joseph's Higher Secondary School, Thiruvananthapuram =

School in Trivandrum, India

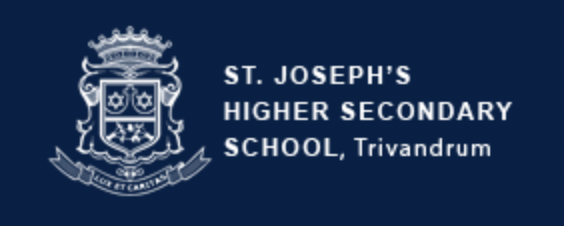

Location
- General Hospital Rd, Palayam; Thiruvananthapuram, Kerala, 695001; India; 8.4997°N 76.9454°E

Information
- Other names: SJHSS, St Joseph's HSS
- Type: Boys' Government
- Motto: "Diligence Brings Excellence"
- Patron saint: Saint Joseph
- Established: April 22, 1857; 169 years ago
- Founder: Carmelite Missionaries
- School code: 43047
- Faculty: 50
- Gender: Boys
- Age: 9 to 18
- Enrollment: 2969
- Campus: 2.8 acres (1.1 ha)
- Houses: 4
- Accreditation: SCERT
- Affiliations: Roman Catholic Archdiocese of Trivandrum, Kerala Higher Secondary Examination Board, Kerala Board of Public Examination
- Website: stjosephshsstvpm.org

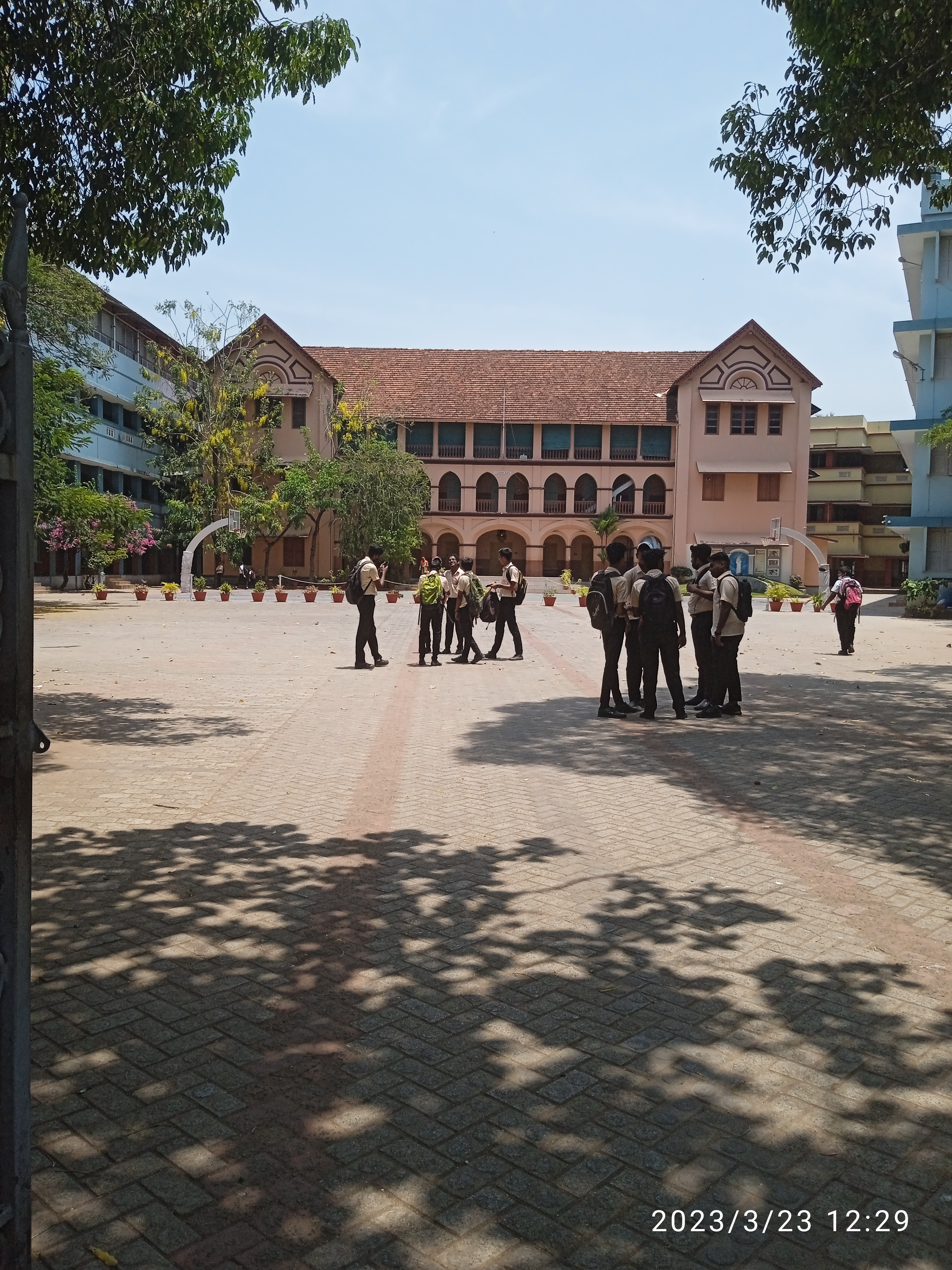

St Joseph's Higher Secondary School (informally St Joseph's or SJHSS) is a government aided boys school in Thiruvananthapuram, Kerala, India, which was established in 1857.

== Notable alumni ==
- Madhu, Veteran Actor in Indian film industry
- Sathyan, film actor and teacher
- Jagannathan, film actor
- Cherian Philip, Indian politician
- Kadakampally Surendran, Indian politician
- K. Muraleedharan, Indian politician
- Sajeev Koshy OAM, Australian dental specialist in public dental service and recipient of Australian Honours
- Rojin Thomas, screenwriter, cinema director
- Jobby Justin, Indian footballer
- K. Jayakumar, former chief secretary of Kerala
- A. V. Anoop, film producer
- Sanju Samson, Indian Cricketer
- Khalej Mohammad AVP, Wealth Management Company, Philadelphia, USA
