= Vaikom Viswan =

Indian politician

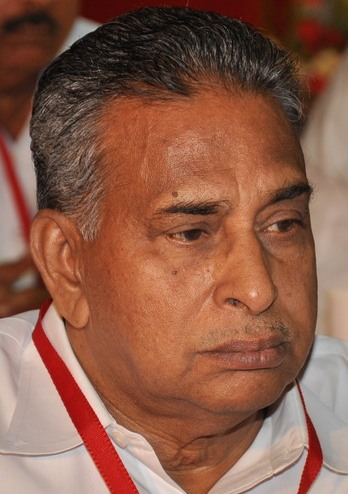
- Born: 28 October 1939 (age 87); Vadayar, Kottayam district, India
- Education: Post Graduate
- Political party: CPI(M)
- Spouse: G Geetha
- Parent(s): Padmanabhan Nair, Karthiyani Amma

Vaikom Viswan is a politician from the State of Kerala in India. He was the Convener of Left Democratic Front (LDF) in Kerala and member of the Central Committee of Communist Party of India (Marxist) (CPIM).

== Early life ==
He was born on 28 October 1939 in Vadayar village, Bhoothapuyam Amsham of Thalayolaparambu Panchayath, Vaikom in Kottayam district, in an ordinary family to Padmanabhan Nair and Karthyayani Amma. He is married to Prof. Geetha and has two children-Nisha and Naveen.

== Political career ==
Vaikom Viswan entered politics as an activist of All India Student Federation (AISF). He has joined the Communist Party of India in 1957. He was President and then Secretary of the Kerala Students' Federation (KSF) and also served as the president of Kerala State Youth Federation (KSYF). He was in the forefront in taking up the famous Naxal Rajan agitation throughout Kerala during the emergency. Vaikom Viswan was subjected to brutal attacks from members of the Community Party of India during the split in 1964. He was also severely beaten by police authorities in many occasions during the early years of his political struggle and student protests. In 1978, he was elected to the State Committee of the Communist Party of India (Marxist). He got elected to the Kerala Legislative Assembly in 1980 from Ettumanoor Constituency in Kottayam District of Kerala State. He held the position of the District Committee Secretary of CPI (M), Kottayam district for about 20 years. In 2005, he was elected to the State Secretariat of CPI (M) in Kerala. In 2009 he was elected to the Central Committee of the CPI (M).

== Positions held ==
- State President & Secretary of KSF.
- Vice President of KSYF.
- MLA Kerala LA in 1980.
- Member of CPI(M) Kerala SC
- Member of CPI(M) Kerala SS
- Member of the CPI(M) CC.
- Convener of LDF
