= Mons Joseph =

Indian politician

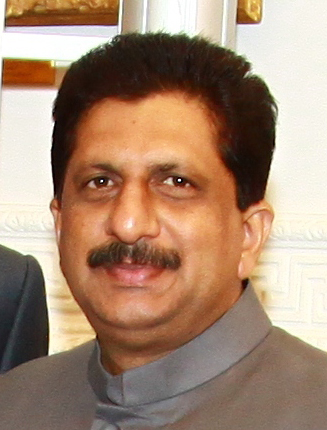

Minister for Water Resources and Housing, Government of Kerala
- Incumbent
- Assumed office 18 May 2026
- Governor: Rajendra Arlekar
- Chief Minister: V. D. Satheesan
- Portfolio(s): See list: Water Resources; Irrigation; Command Area Development Authority (CADA); Ground Water Department; Water Supply & Sanitation; Housing
- Preceded by: Roshy Augustine (Water Resources); K. Rajan (Housing)

Minister for Public Works, Government of Kerala
- In office 18 October 2007 – 16 October 2009
- Preceded by: T. U. Kuruvilla
- Succeeded by: P. J. Joseph
- In office 14 May 1996 – May 2001
- Preceded by: P. M. Mathew
- Succeeded by: Stephen George

Member of the Kerala Legislative Assembly
- Incumbent
- Assumed office 11 May 2006
- Preceded by: Stephen George
- Constituency: Kaduthuruthy

Personal details
- Born: 30 May 1964 (age 62) Kaduthuruthy, Kottayam, Kerala, India
- Party: Kerala Congress
- Spouse: Sonia
- Children: 2
- Parents: O. Joseph; Mariamma Joseph
- Education: Bachelor of Arts; Bachelor of Laws; Master of Arts
- Alma mater: Baselius College, Kottayam; The Kerala Law Academy Law College, Thiruvananthapuram; Annamalai University, Cuddalore
- As of 26 May, 2026 Source: niyamasabha.org

Mons Joseph (born 30 May 1964) is an Indian politician and lawyer. He belongs to Kerala Congress led by P. J. Joseph. He had been the Minister for Public Works from October 2007 till his resignation in October 2009 for his party chairman P. J. Joseph to become the minister. He has been representing the Kaduthuruthy constituency in the Kerala Legislative Assembly since 2006. He is the current cabinet Minister for water resources and housing for the state government of Kerala.

On 19 March 2021, he and his colleague P. J. Joseph resigned from their respective MLA positions fearing disqualification due to issues relating to their newly formed party's symbol allocation. He had previously won the Kerala Legislative Assembly election from Kaduthuruthy constituency in 2021. In the 2026 Kerala Legislative Assembly election, Mons Joseph secured a decisive victory from Kaduthuruthy after which he was sworn in as the Minister for Water Resources and Housing.

== Early life ==
He was born at Kaduthuruthy in a Syro-Malabar family on 30 May 1964. His parents are O. Joseph and Mariamma Joseph. Mons graduated in M.A., LL.B. and served as a social and political worker. He entered politics through K.S.C. while a student. He served as Chairman and General Secretary of K.S.C., Baselius College, Kottayam, President and General Secretary of Students Congress, President, Youth Front (J) State Committee and Kerala Congress Kottayam District Committee. He held position of President of the Post Graduate Students' Association and office bearer of various trade unions and served as a member of the Kerala Youth Welfare Committee, Consumer Protection Committee, and Mahatma Gandhi University senate. He also held many students agitations.

== Personal life ==
Mons is married to Sonia, who works as a high school teacher. The couple have a son and a daughter.
