= Cherpu Assembly constituency =

Former constituency of the Kerala legislative assembly in India

Coordinates: 10.43°N 76.20°E

Cherpu
- Former constituency for the Kerala Legislative Assembly

Constituency details
- Country: India
- Region: South India
- State: Kerala
- District: Thrissur
- Established: 1977
- Abolished: 2008
- Reservation: None

The Cherpu Assembly Constituency of Kerala Legislative Assembly.

== Members of the Legislative Assembly ==
Year	Member	Party
1977	K. P. Prabhakaran	CPI
1980	K. P. Prabhakaran	CPI
1982	K. P. Prabhakaran	CPI
1987	V. V. Raghavan	CPI
1991	V. V. Raghavan	CPI
1996	K. P. Rajendran	CPI
2001	K. P. Rajendran	CPI
2006	V. S. Sunil Kumar	CPI
