= T. P. Peethambaran =

Indian politician

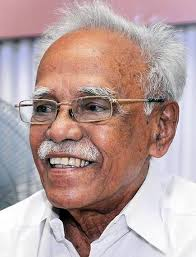

Member of the Kerala Legislative Assembly for Palluruthy
- In office 1980–1991
- Preceded by: Eapen Varghese
- Succeeded by: Dominic Presentation

Personal details
- Born: 19 February 1928 (age 98)
- Party: Nationalist Congress Party
- Other political affiliations: Indian Congress (Socialist) – Sarat Chandra Sinha, Indian Congress (Socialist), Indian National Congress (U)
- Spouse: K. K. Thankamma
- Children: 3 Sons, 1 Daughter
- Parent: T. K. Pappu (father)
- Education: Graduate, B.T
- Profession: Teacher

T. Pappu Peethambaran (born 19 February 1928) is an Indian politician and National Secretary of Nationalist Congress Party. He represented Palluruthy constituency in the Kerala Legislative Assembly from 1980 to 1991. He was President of Nationalist Congress Party Kerala Unit.

== Position Held ==
- Chairman, Library Advisory Committee (1980–82).
- Vice President, Ernakulam District Congress (S) Committee;
- President, Ernakulam District Congress (S) Committee, All India Secondary Teachers Federation;
- General Secretary, K.P.C.C. (S), Nationalist Congress Party, PSTA; Member, Palluruthy Panchayath, All India Education Advisory Board;
- Coluncillor, Corporation of Cochin;
- Started political career through Cochin Rajya Praja Mandal;
- Joined ISP in 1948;
- State executive member of PSP till 1960;
- Joined INC in 1962.
