= K. Somaprasad =

Indian politician

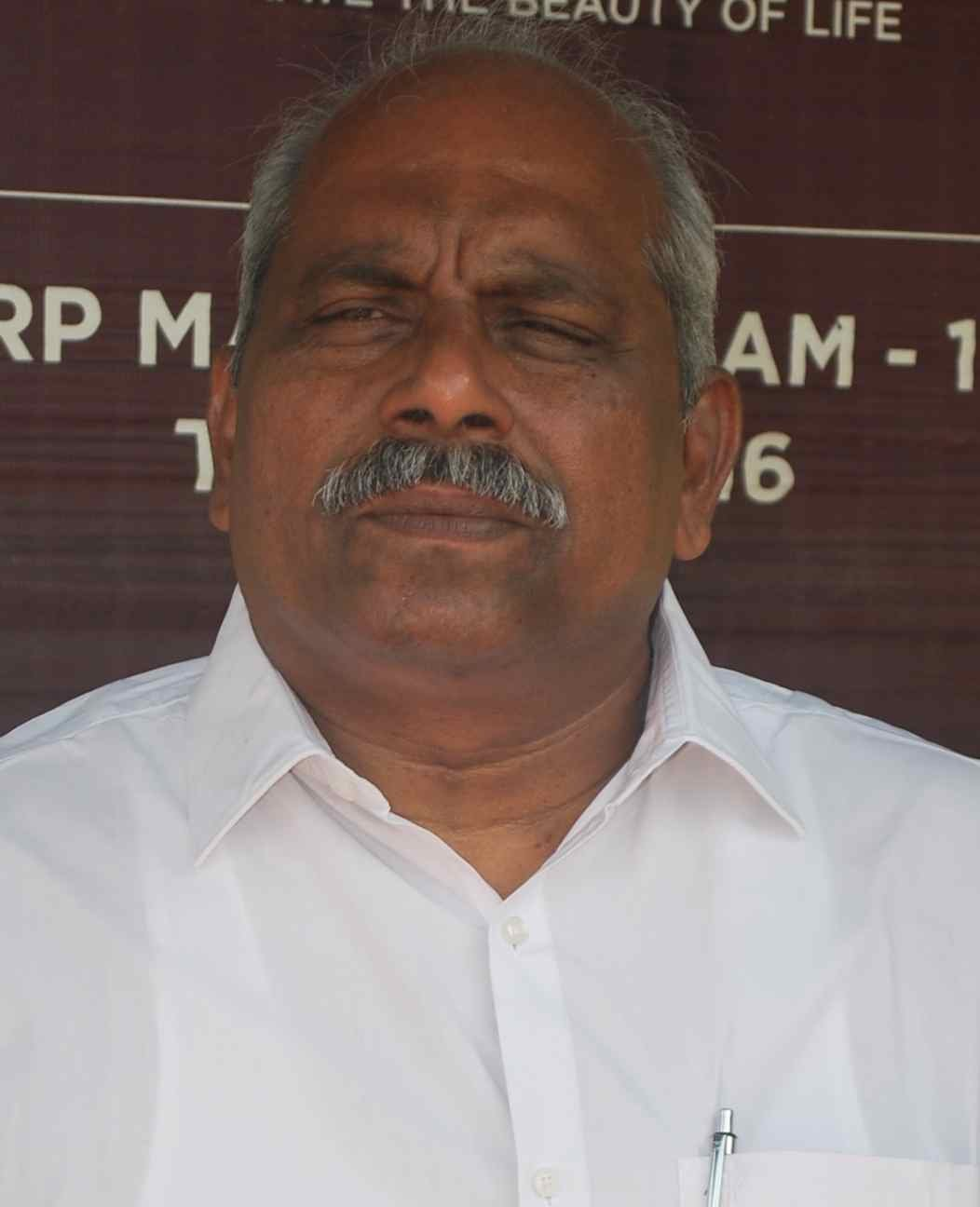

MP of Rajya Sabha for Kerala
- In office 3 April 2016 – 2 April 2022
- Preceded by: K.N. Balagopal, CPI(M)
- Succeeded by: A. A. Rahim
- Constituency: Kerala

Personal details
- Born: Sasthamcotta, Kollam
- Party: Communist Party of India (Marxist)
- Spouse: Sujatha M.R
- Education: D.B. College Sasthamcotta
- Occupation: Politician

Advocate K. Somaprasad was a Rajyasabha member from Kerala. He was the President of Kollam district panchayat and state committee member of CPI(M) unit of Kerala. He was CPI(M) candidate for the Rajya Sabha elections for Kerala state held in March 2016. State Secretary of Pattika jaathi Kshema Samithi ( PKS )

== Rajya Sabha member ==
Parliamentary Committee assignments

- 13 Sept. 2021 onwards: Member Committee on External Affairs
