= K C Pillai (politician) =

Indian communist politician

K Chandrasekhara Pillai
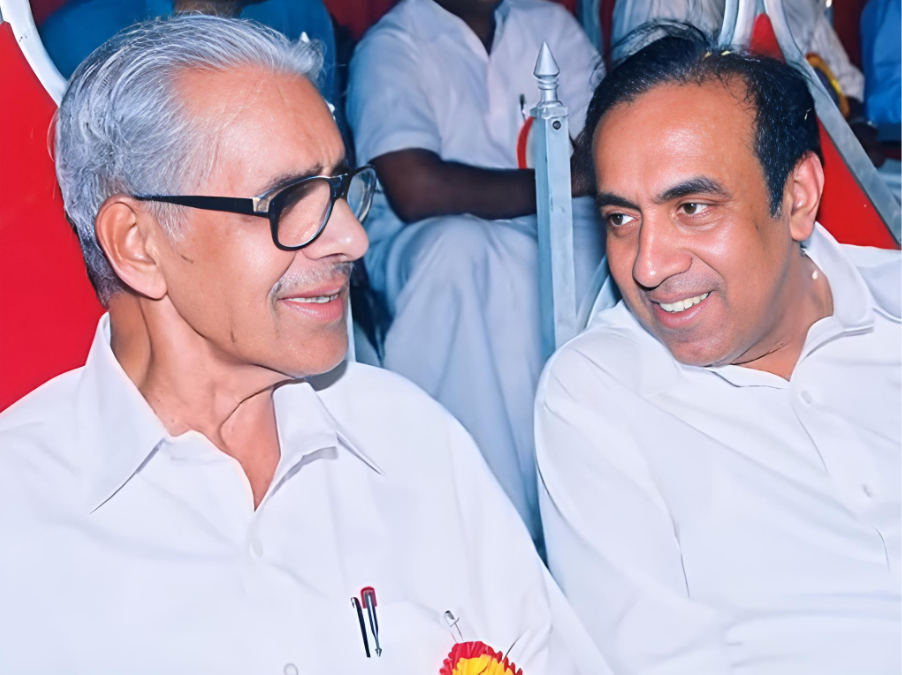
- K.C Pillai (left) with Ravi Pillai (right)
- Born: Kollam, Travancore (present-day Kollam, Kerala)
- Died: 19 December 2011
- Relatives: B. Ravi Pillai

Krishna Chandrasekhara Pillai, also known as K. C. Pillai was a senior member and former Assistant Secretary of the Communist Party of India (CPI) in Kerala.

== Early life ==
K. C. Pillai was born into a Nair family to Thevalakkara Puthensangetham Kaarichal Veettil Krishna Pillai and Padmavathy Amma in Kollam, Kerala. He is the uncle of the prominent businessman B. Ravi Pillai.

K. C. Pillai early education was from Ayyankoikkal Government Upper Primary School and Government High School, Chavara. He ventured into politics at a young age.

Later, he was appointed as the Assistant Secretary of the Communist Party of India (CPI) State, Chairman of the CPI State Control Commission, Secretary of Kollam District, and convener of the LDF Kollam District.

== Death ==
He died on 19 December 2011, due to health issues at Lakeshore Hospital in Ernakulam.
