= Stephen George (politician) =

Indian politician

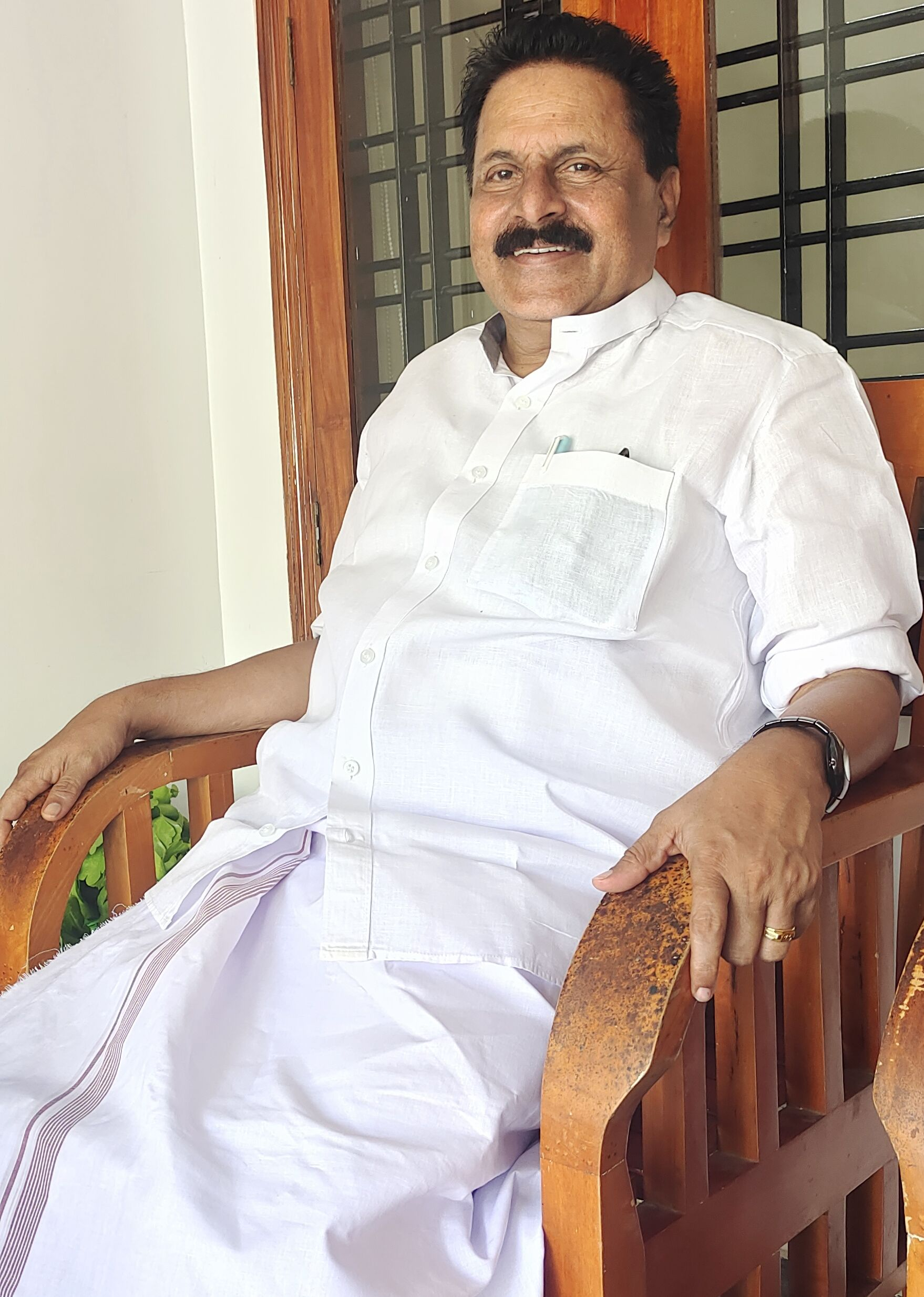

Member, Kerala Legislative Assembly
- In office 2001 - 2006
- Preceded by: Mons Joseph
- Succeeded by: Mons Joseph
- Constituency: Kaduthuruthy

Chairman, Kerala State Minority Development Finance Corporation Ltd (KSMDFC)
- Preceded by: Government of Kerala

Chairman, Knanaya Multi State Co-Operative Credit Society Limited Kottayam
- Preceded by: Director board members

Personal details
- Born: 25 May 1963 (age 63) Kaduthuruthy, Kottayam, Kerala
- Party: Kerala Congress (M)
- Spouse: Jijimol G Stephen
- Children: 3
- Parents: George Cheriyan; Naithy Cheriyan

Stephen George is an Indian politician and a leader of Kerala Congress (Mani), a splinter faction of Kerala Congress. George is a former MLA of the Kerala Legislative Assembly from Kaduthuruthy in the Kottayam district.
