= Vadayar =

- village
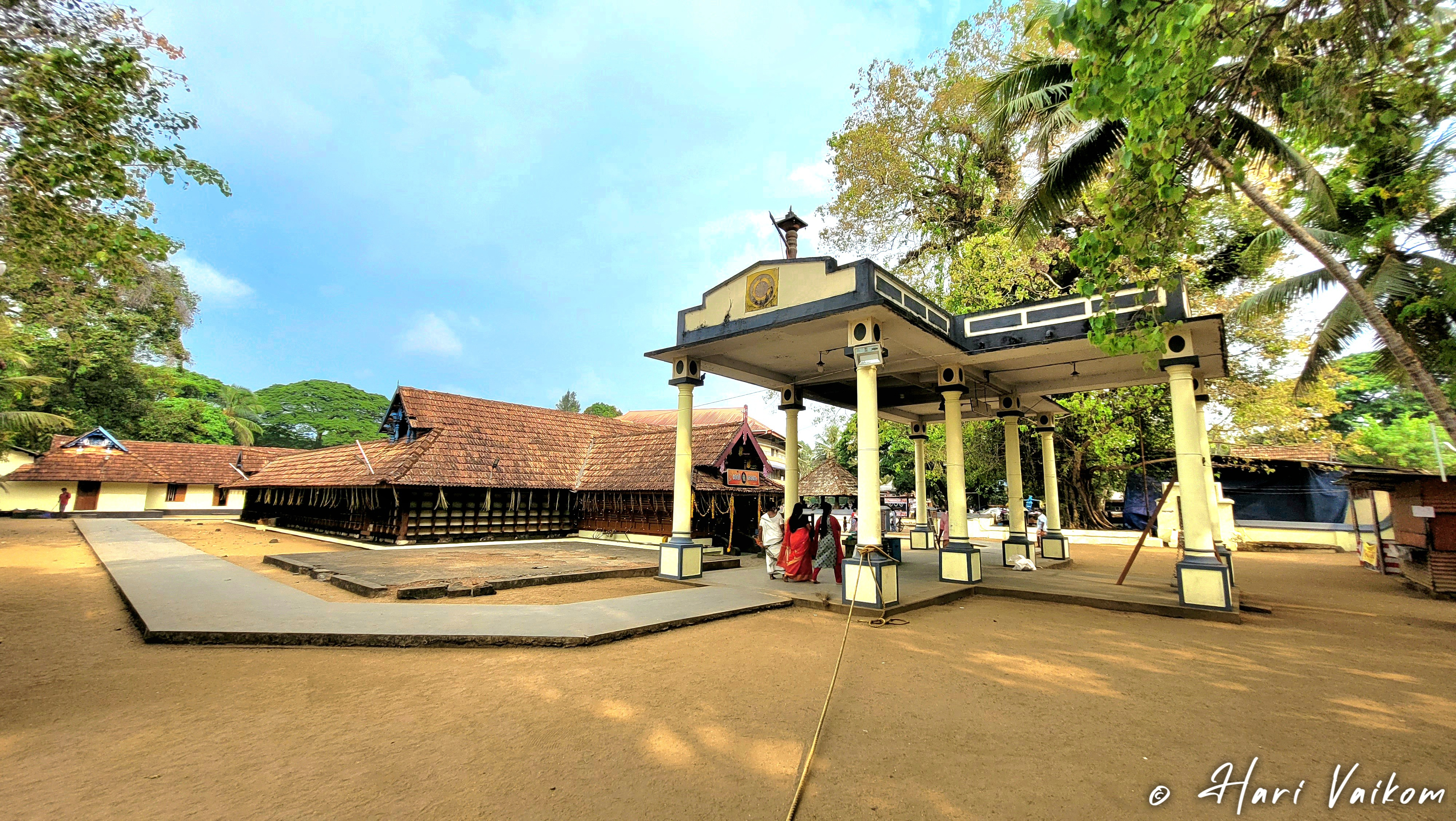

- Location in Kerala, India Vadayar (India)
- Coordinates: 9°46′30″N 76°25′45″E
- Country: India
- State: Kerala
- District: Kottayam

Government
  - Body: Gram panchayat

Population (2011)
  - Total: 22,571

Languages
  - Official: Malayalam, English
- Time zone: UTC+5:30 (IST)
- PIN: 686605
- Telephone code: 04829-
- Vehicle registration: KL-36
- Nearest city: Kottaym, Ernakulam

Vadayar is a village in Kottayam district in the state of Kerala, India. Vadayar Ilamkavu Devi Temple dedicated to Goddess Bhagavathy or Devi in a fierce form is located here, which about 9 km away from Vaikom on the bank of River Vadayar, a distributary of Muvattupuzha river.

Two main festivals are held here. One is the flag hosting festival held in the month of February that lasts for eight days (February). Other is the famous 2 day Elamkavu Attuvela Mahotsavam (water carnival ), observed in Malayalam Meenammonth (March–April) which is a unique festival celebration through the river water.

The Infant Jesus Church Vadayar is one of the oldest religious institution, has a history of 1015 years. Which is situated 8 kilometers from Vaikom. During the Mysorean invasion of Malabar, the Administrative headquarters was shifted from Kodungalloor to Vadayar. A small piece of wood from the remains of the holy cross in which Christ crucified was received from Pope Pius VI is placed on the altar of the Church. Nearest Railway stations are Vaikom Road and Piravom Road.

== Demographics ==
As of 2011 India census, Vadayar had a population of 22571 with 11101 males and 11470 females.
