= C. A. Kurian =

Indian politician (1933–2021)

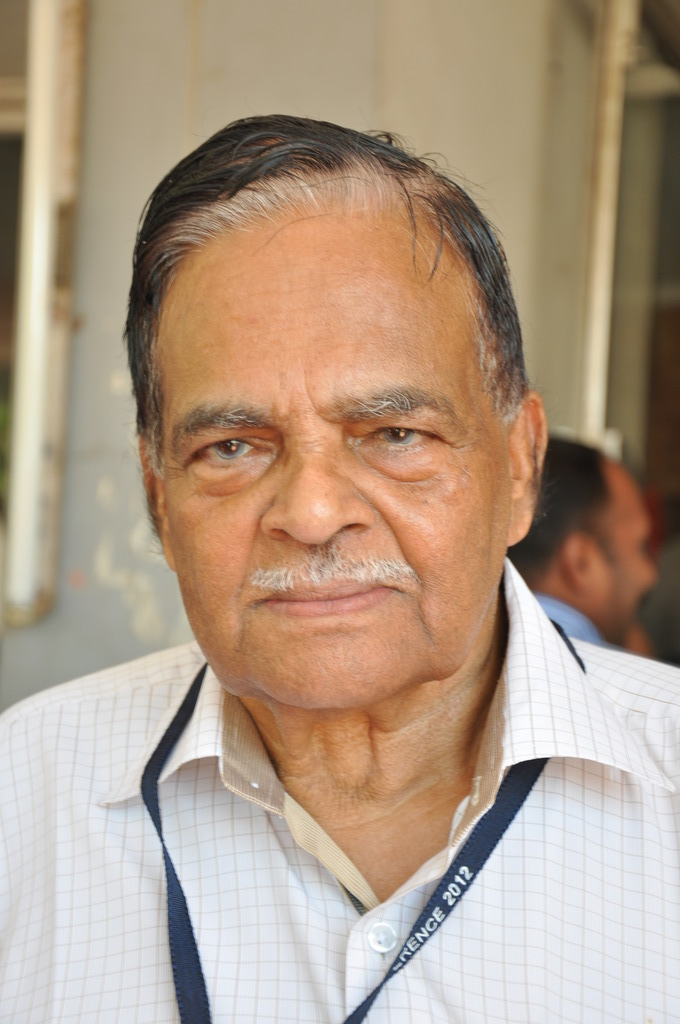

Chembilayil Abraham Kurian (20 January 1933 – 20 March 2021) was an Indian trade union leader, legislator, and leader of the Communist Party of India. He was born to Abraham of the Chembilayil house. He was the Chair of Deputy Speaker in the 10th Kerala Legislative Assembly. He was first elected to the 5th Kerala Legislative Assembly in 1977 from Peermade constituency. He represented the same constituency in the 6th and 10th Kerala Legislative Assembly. He was a bank employee before entering politics in 1960. He was detained for 17 months in Viyur Central Jail from 1965 to 1966 and was also imprisoned for 27 months during different periods of his life.

Kurian died on 20 March 2021 at age 88.

== Political career ==
- CPI State Executive Committee; State Secretary,
- AITUC; General Secretary, All India Plantation Workers Federation;
