= Joseph M. Puthussery =

Indian politician

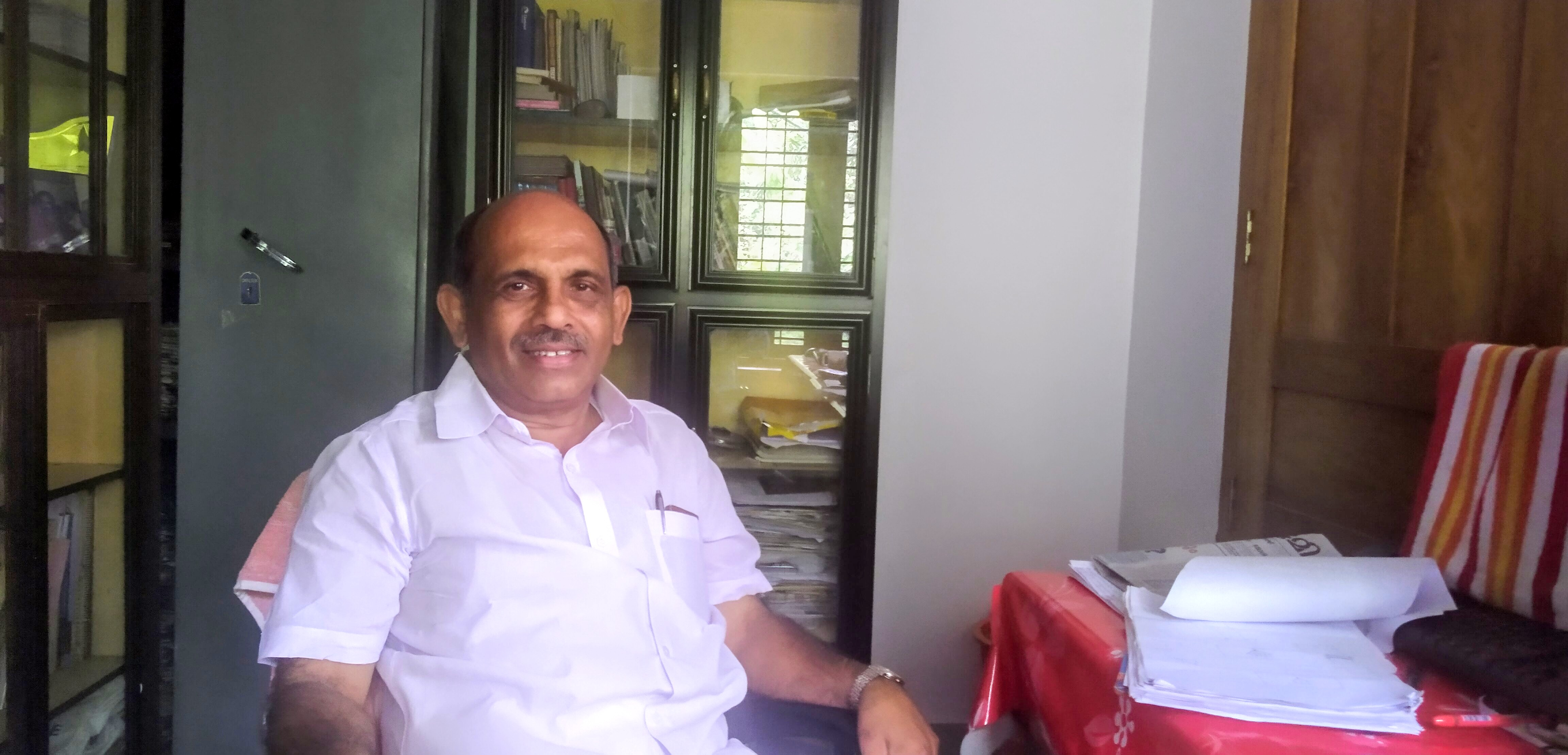

Member of Kerala Legislative Assembly (MLA)
- In office 1991–1996
- Constituency: Kallooppara Constituency
- In office 2001–2011

Personal details
- Born: 28 April 1959 (age 67) Kallooppara, Pathanamthitta district, Kerala
- Party: Kerala Congress
- Spouse: Lylee
- Children: 3

Joseph Mamman Puthussery (born at Kalloppara on 28 April 1959) is an Indian politician. He serves as senior leader of the Kerala Congress.

== Early life ==
Joseph M. Puthussery was born on April 28, 1959, in Kallooppara, Pathanamthitta district of Kerala as the son of Mamman and Mariamma. He entered politics as a student through Kerala Students Congress (K.S.C), the students' wing of Kerala Congress. He served as school unit secretary, vice president, All Kerala Balajana Sakhyam, State General Secretary and President, KSC; General Secretary, Kerala Youth Front and KTUC State Committee. He was a member, KSRTC Director Board, KSEB Consultative Committee, MG University Senate.

== Career ==
Following university, he was on Southern Railway Consultative Committee, District Sports Council, Pathanamthitta, Malankara Orthodox Church Managing Committee, MOC's Colleges Governing Body; Was Office Bearer, Transport Driver's Union; Electricity Board Executive Employees Union, Assistant Engineers Association, Coconut Development Corporation Staff Union.

He serves as General Secretary and Official Spokesman of Kerala Congress (M); Chairman, Mallappally Public Stadium Society. Was Secretary and Chief Whip of Kerala Congress (M) Parliamentary Party; Member, UDF State Co-ordination Committee.

Since 2017 a column entitled 'Veenduvicharam' is being written in a Malayalam Daily.Seven books 'Veenduvicharam', 'Vimarsam', 'Kalam Kannadi Nokkunnu', 'Paksham Janapaksham','Vox Populi', 'Democrisis' and 'Kandum Kettum Nadannum Paranjum...' have been published.

He was the General Secretary of the Kerala Congress (M) and after the death of K. M. Mani, he left the party and joined the Joseph faction of the Kerala Congress in protest against the decision of Jose faction of Kerala Congress (M) to join the Left Democratic Front.

== Electoral politics ==
Puthussery was elected as Member of Kerala Legislative Assembly from the old Kallooppara constituency in 1991, 2001 and 2006, but did not get a seat after the constituency was abolished in 2011. He later contested the 2016 assembly elections from Tiruvalla constituency but lost to Mathew T. Thomas.

During his Tenure as MLA, Puthussery served as a member of the Privileges Committee, Public Undertaking Committee, Official Language Committee, Environment Committee, Rules Committee, Petitions Committee and Committee for the Welfare of Women and Children.

Puthusserry was a participant in the seven Annual General Assembly Sessions of the Inter Parliamentary Assembly on Orthodoxy (IAO) held at Greek Parliament (2013), Russian Parliament (2014), Vienna (2015), Thessaloniki (2016), Italian Parliament (2017) Greek Parliament (2018)and Georgian Parliament(2019). IAO combines the efforts of European countries, with headquarters in the Greek Parliament. During his visit to the 2017 IAO General Assembly, he met with Pope Francis. He also met Prokopios Pavlopoulos, Greek President during the IAO 25th Annual General Assembly.
