= Therambil Ramakrishnan =

Indian politician and lawyer

Adv. Therambil Ramakrishnan
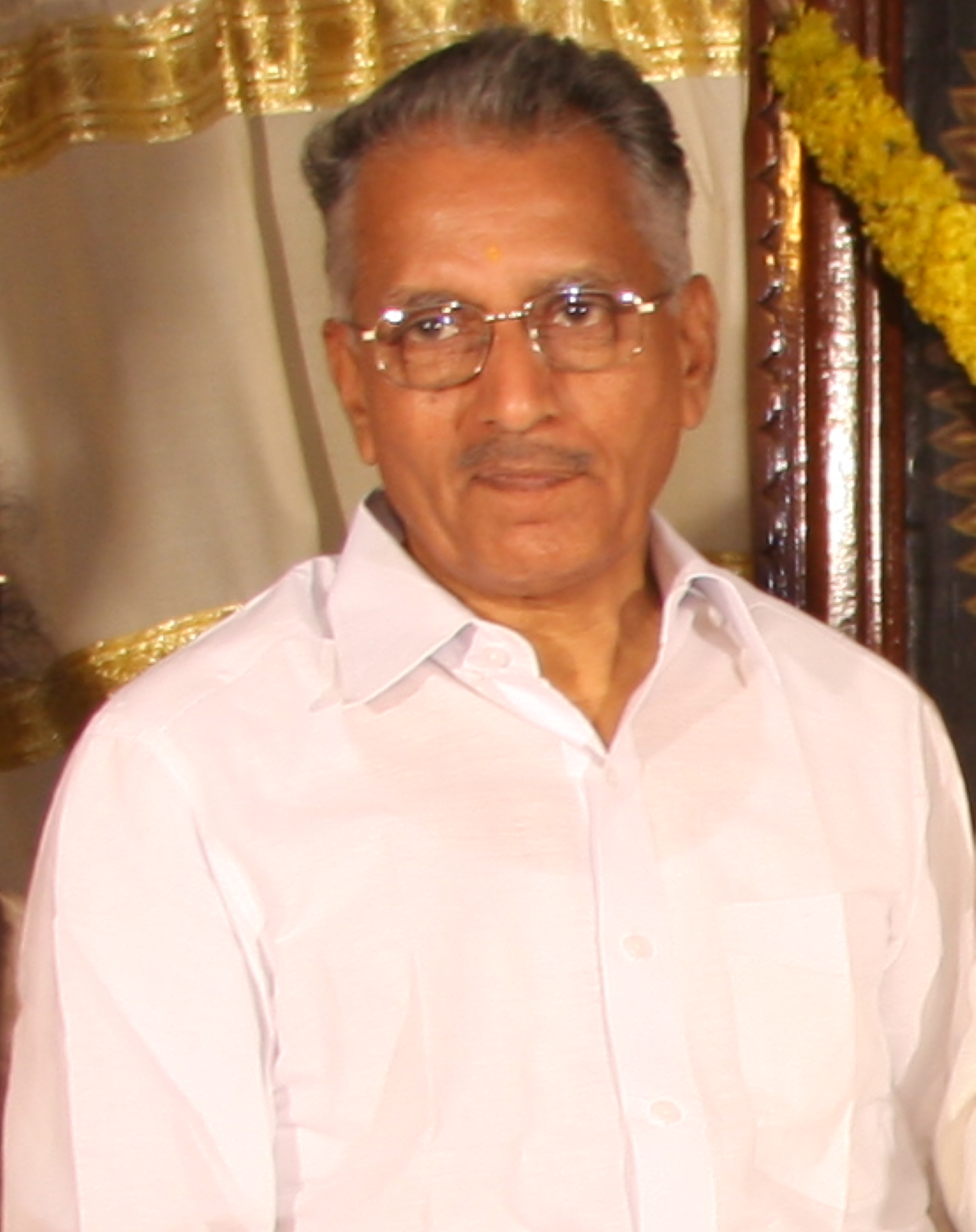

Member of Kerala Legislative Assembly
- In office 1991–2016
- Preceded by: E. K. Menon
- Succeeded by: V. S. Sunil Kumar
- Constituency: Thrissur

Speaker of Kerala Legislative Assembly
- In office 2004–2006
- Governor: R. L. Bhatia
- Preceded by: Vakkom Purushothaman
- Succeeded by: K. Radhakrishnan
- In office 1995–1996
- Governor: B. Rachaiah; P. Shiv Shankar
- Preceded by: P.P. Thankachan
- Succeeded by: M. Vijayakumar

Personal details
- Born: 3 June 1941 (age 85) Kutoor, Thrissur, Kerala
- Party: Indian National Congress; National Democratic Party
- Spouse: Chandramathy Ramakrishnan
- Children: Geetha and Harishankar

Therambil Ramakrishnan is a lawyer and an Indian National Congress politician from Thrissur and a former Member of the Legislative Assembly of Thrissur to Kerala Legislative Assembly in 1982, 1991, 1996, 2001, 2006 and 2011. He was the former Speaker of Kerala Legislative Assembly from 1995–96, 2004–2006. He also serves as a member of KPCC Executive.
