= Kaduthuruthy Assembly constituency =

Constituency of the Legislative Assembly of keralam in India

Kaduthuruthy
- Constituency No. 94 for the State Legislative Assembly
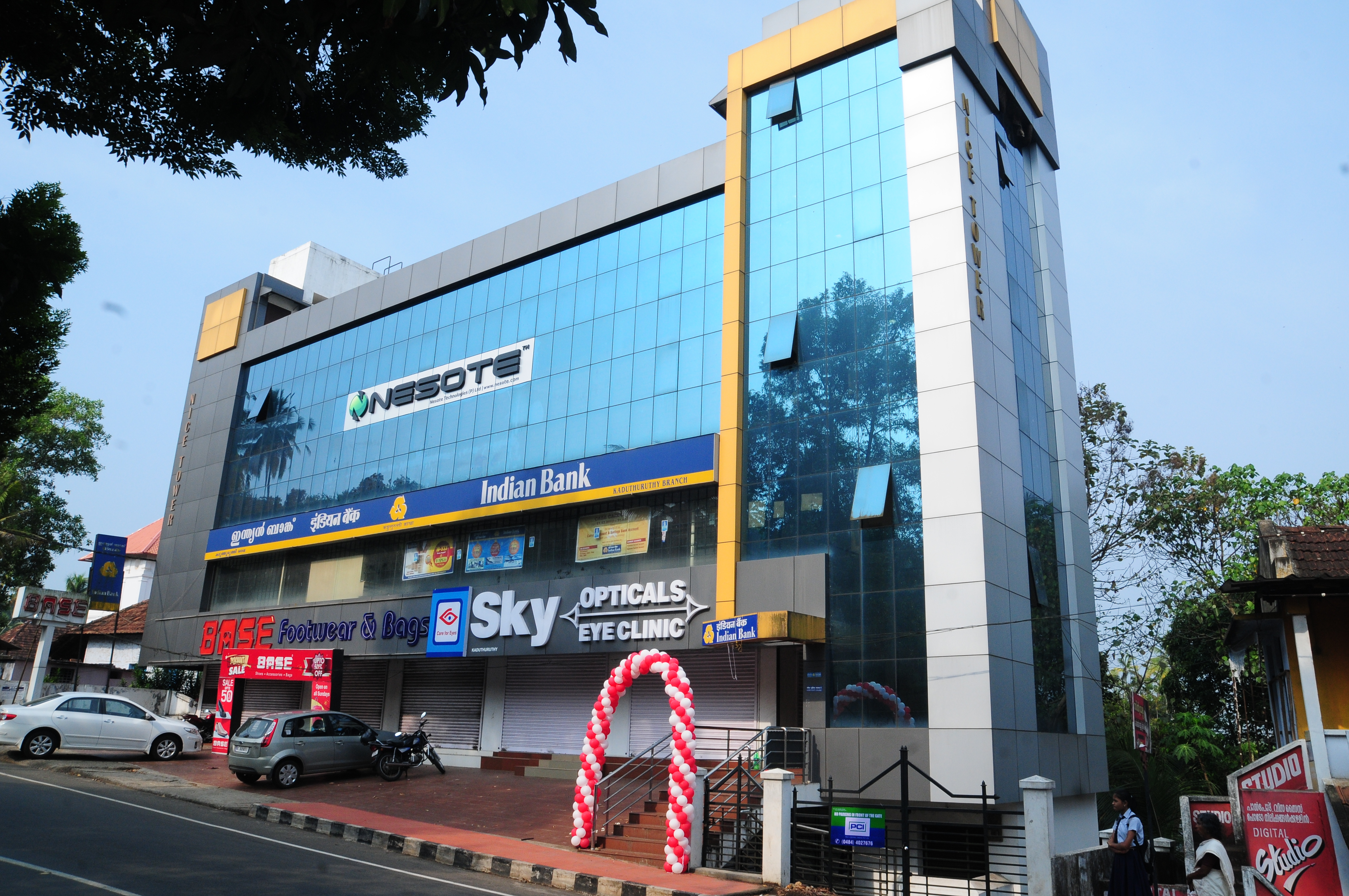
- Kaduthuruthy town

Constituency details
- Country: India
- State: Keralam
- District: Kottayam
- Established: 1957
- Total electors: 2,14,779 (2019)
- Reservation: None

Member of Legislative Assembly
- Incumbent Mons Joseph
- Party: KEC
- Alliance: UDF
- Elected year: 2026

Kaduthuruthy State assembly constituency is one of the 140 state legislative assembly constituencies in Kerala in southern India. It is also one of the seven state legislative assembly constituencies included in Kottayam Lok Sabha constituency.

== Local self-governed segments ==
Kaduthurthy Assembly constituency is composed of the following local self-governed segments:

Sl no.	Name	Status (Grama panchayat/Municipality)	Taluk
1	Kaduthuruthy	Grama panchayat	Vaikom
2	Manjoor	Grama panchayat	Vaikom
3	Mulakulam	Grama panchayat	Vaikom
4	Njeezhoor	Grama panchayat	Vaikom
5	Kadaplamattom	Grama panchayat	Meenachil
6	Kanakkary	Grama panchayat	Meenachil
7	Kidangoor	Grama panchayat	Meenachil
8	Kuravilangad	Grama panchayat	Meenachil
9	Marangattupilly	Grama panchayat	Meenachil
10	Uzhavoor	Grama panchayat	Meenachil
11	Veliyannoor	Grama panchayat	Meenachil

== Members of Legislative Assembly ==
The following list contains all members of Kerala Legislative Assembly who have represented the constituency:

Election	Niyama Sabha	Member	Party	Tenure
1957	1st	M. C. Abraham	Indian National Congress	1957 – 1960
1960	2nd	M.C. Abraham	Indian National Congress	1960 – 1965
1967	3rd	Joseph Chazhikattu	Kerala Congress	1967 – 1970
1970	4th	O. Lukose	Kerala Congress	1970 – 1977
1977	5th	O. Lukose	Kerala Congress	1977 – 1980
1980	6th	O. Lukose	Kerala Congress	1980 – 1982
1982	7th	P. C. Thomas	Independent	1982 – 1987
1987	8th	P. C. Thomas	Independent	1987 – 1991
1991	9th	P. M. Mathew	Kerala Congress	1991 – 1996
1996	10th	Mons Joseph	Kerala Congress	1996 – 2001
2001	11th	Stephen George (politician)	Kerala Congress	2001 – 2006
2006	12th	Mons Joseph	Kerala Congress	2006 – 2011
2011	13th	Mons Joseph	Kerala Congress	2011 – 2016
2016	14th	Mons Joseph	Kerala Congress	2016 - 2021
2021	15th	Mons Joseph	Kerala Congress	2021 - 2026
2026	16th	Mons Joseph	Kerala Congress	2026 - present

== Election results ==
Percentage change (±%) denotes the change in the number of votes from the immediate previous election.

=== 2026 ===
2026 Kerala Legislative Assembly election: Kaduthuruthy
Party	Candidate	Votes	%	±%
KEC	Mons Joseph	70,353	56.39	
KC(M)	Nirmala Jimmy	39,053	31.3	
BDJS	Suresh Ittikkunnel	12,228	9.8	
AAP	Dominic Simon	628	0.5	
NOTA	None of the above	898	0.72	
Margin of victory		31,300		
Turnout		124,752		
KEC hold		Swing		

=== 2021 ===
Kerala Legislative Assembly Election, 2021: Kaduthuruthy
Party	Candidate	Votes	%	±%
KEC	Mons Joseph	59,666	45.4	
KC(M)	Stephen George (politician)	55,410	42.17	
BJP	Lijin Lal	11,670	8.88	
NOTA	None of the above	731	0.56	
Majority		4,256		
Turnout		1,32,444	70.48	
Registered electors		1,87,910		
KEC hold		Swing		

=== 2016 ===
There were 182,749 registered voters in the constituency for the 2016 Kerala Assembly election.

2016 Kerala Legislative Assembly election: Kaduthuruthy
Party	Candidate	Votes	%	±%
KC(M)	Mons Joseph	73,793	58.03	▲1.66
Kerala Congress	Scaria Thomas	31,537	24.80	−
KEC	Stephen Chazhikkadan	17,536	13.79	−
NOTA	None of the above	1,533	1.21	−
BSP	Ginish John M	1,473	1.16	▼0.62
Independent	T. P. Kuttappan Kuruppanthara	968	0.76	−
Independent	Rajeev Kidangoor	332	0.26	−
Margin of victory		42,256	33.23	▲14.34
Turnout		1,27,172	69.59	▼1.57
KC(M) hold		Swing	▲1.66	

=== 2011 ===
There were 171,486 registered voters in the constituency for the 2011 election.

2011 Kerala Legislative Assembly election: Kaduthuruthy
Party	Candidate	Votes	%	±%
KC(M)	Mons Joseph	68,787	56.37	
KC(AMG)	Stephen George	45,730	37.48	
BJP	P. G. Bijukumar	5,340	4.38	
BSP	M. D. Thomas	2,169	1.78	−
Margin of victory		23,057	18.89	
Turnout		1,22,026	71.16	
KC(M) hold		Swing		

=== 2006 ===
There were 131,824 registered voters in the constituency for the 2006 election.

2006 Kerala Legislative Assembly election: Kaduthuruthy
Party	Candidate	Votes	%	±%
KEC	Mons Joseph	44,958	48.32	
KC(M)	Stephen George	42,957	46.17	
BJP	K R Madhu	2, 646	2.84	
Independent	Monson Joseph	1,105	1.18	
BSP	C.M Devasia	927	0.99	−
SWJP	E.V Joseph	439	0.47	
Margin of victory		2,001	2.15	
Turnout		93,032	70.60	
KEC gain from KC(M)		Swing		

=== 2001 ===
There were 131,714 registered voters in the constituency for the 2001 election.

2001 Kerala Legislative Assembly election: Kaduthuruthy
Party	Candidate	Votes	%	±%
KC(M)	Stephen George	50,055	50.14	
KEC	Mons Joseph	45,406	45.48	
BJP	P B Thamby	2,767	2.77	
Independent	M T Shibu	1,138	1.14	
Independent	Stephen	461	0.46	
Margin of victory		4,649	4.66	
Turnout		99,827	75.85	
KC(M) gain from KEC		Swing		

=== 1996 ===
There were 132,503 registered voters in the constituency for the 1996 election.

1996 Kerala Legislative Assembly election: Kaduthuruthy
Party	Candidate	Votes	%	±%
KEC	Mons Joseph	39,131	44.21	
KC(M)	P M Mathew	23,965	27.07	
Independent	P C Thomas	20,950	23.67	
BJP	Neezhoor Devarajan	2,825	1.14	
Independent	U R Harshakumar	455	0.51	
Independent	V Karthikeyan Nair	352	0.40	
Independent	V D John	271	0.31	
Independent	John Poochakkadan	204	0.23	
Independent	Biby Stephen Thekkenattu	144	0.16	
Independent	Joseph Pathrose	84	0.09	
Independent	Charley Joseph	75	0.08	
Independent	Chacko Joseph	58	0.07	
Margin of victory		15,166	17.23	
Turnout		88,514	69.53	
KEC gain from KC(M)		Swing		

== See also ==
- Kaduthuruthy
- Kottayam district
- List of constituencies of the Kerala Legislative Assembly
- 2016 Kerala Legislative Assembly election
