= List of candidates in the 2021 Kerala Legislative Assembly election =

List of candidates in the 2021 Kerala Legislative Assembly election from the three major alliances namely the candidates from the Left Democratic Front (LDF), United Democratic Front (UDF) and National Democratic Alliance (NDA) are listed in the table below.

The performance of candidates from major alliances is available in table format at Performance of candidates from major alliances of the 2021 Kerala Legislative Assembly election.

Many parties, including the CPI-M, the INC and the CPI, did not give seats to most sitting candidates who had already served two terms. A third of selected candidates had prior experience in local bodies. The Indian Union Muslim League fielded a female candidate - Noorbeena Rasheed (Kozhikode South) - for the first time in 25 years. Anannyah Kumari Alex (Vengara) became the first transgender candidate to run for the Kerala Legislative Assembly, but later suspended her campaign after alleged harassment from her party members. The Election Commission turned down the nomination papers of BJP candidates in Thalassery, Guruvayur, and the AIADMK candidate in Devikulam as their nominations were incomplete.

== List of Candidates ==
District	Constituency		LDF		UDF		NDA	
District	#	Name	Party	Candidate	Party	Candidate	Party	Candidate
Kasaragod	1	Manjeshwar	CPM	V. V. Rameshan	IUML	A. K. M. Ashraf	BJP	K. Surendran
Kasaragod	2	Kasaragod	INL	M. A. Latheef	IUML	N. A. Nellikkunnu	BJP	K. Sreekanth
Kasaragod	3	Udma	CPM	C. H. Kunhambu	INC	Periya Balakrishnan	BJP	A. Velayudhan
Kasaragod	4	Kanhangad	CPI	E. Chandrasekharan	INC	P. V. Suresh	BJP	M. Balraj
Kasaragod	5	Thrikaripur	CPM	M. Rajagopal	KEC	M. P. Joseph	BJP	T. V. Shibin
Kannur	6	Payyanur	CPM	T. I. Madusoodhanan	INC	M. Pradeep Kumar	BJP	K. K. Sreedharan
Kannur	7	Kalliasseri	CPM	M. Vijin	INC	Brijesh Kumar	BJP	Arun Kaithapram
Kannur	8	Taliparamba	CPM	M. V. Govindan	INC	V. P. Abdul Rasheed	BJP	A. P. Gangadharan
Kannur	9	Irikkur	KC(M)	Saji Kuttiyanimattom	INC	Sajeev Joseph	BJP	Aniyamma Rajendran
Kannur	10	Azhikode	CPM	K. V. Sumesh	IUML	K. M. Shaji	BJP	K. Ranjith
Kannur	11	Kannur	C(S)	K. Ramachandran	INC	Satheeshan Pacheni	BJP	Archana Vandichal
Kannur	12	Dharmadom	CPM	Pinarayi Vijayan	INC	C. Raghunath	BJP	C. K. Padmanabhan
Kannur	13	Thalassery	CPM	A. N. Shamseer	INC	M. P. Aravindakshan		
Kannur	14	Kuthuparamba	LJD	K. P. Mohanan	IUML	P. K. Abdulla	BJP	C. Sadanandan Master
Kannur	15	Mattanur	CPM	K. K. Shailaja	RSP	Illikkal Agasthy	BJP	Biju Elakkuzhi
Kannur	16	Peravoor	CPM	Sakeer Hussain	INC	Sunny Joseph	BJP	Smitha Jayamohan
Wayanad	17	Mananthavady	CPM	O. R. Kelu	INC	P. K. Jayalakshmi	BJP	Mukundan Palliyara
Wayanad	18	Sulthan Bathery	CPM	M. S. Viswanathan	INC	I. C. Balakrishnan	JRS	C. K. Janu
Wayanad	19	Kalpetta	LJD	M. V. Shreyams Kumar	INC	T. Siddique	BJP	T. M. Subeesh
Kozhikode	20	Vatakara	LJD	Manayath Chandran	RMPI	K. K. Rema	BJP	M. Rajesh Kumar
Kozhikode	21	Kuttiady	CPM	K. P. Kunhammadkutty	IUML	Parakkal Abdulla	BJP	P. P. Murali
Kozhikode	22	Nadapuram	CPI	E. K. Vijayan	INC	K. Praveen Kumar	BJP	M. P. Rajan
Kozhikode	23	Quilandy	CPM	Kanathil Jameela	INC	N. Subramanian	BJP	N. P. Radhakrishnan
Kozhikode	24	Perambra	CPM	T. P. Ramakrishnan	IND	C. H. Ibrahimkutty	BJP	K. V. Sudheer
Kozhikode	25	Balussery	CPM	K. M. Sachin Dev	INC	Dharmajan Bolgatty	BJP	Libin Bhaskar
Kozhikode	26	Elathur	NCP	A. K. Saseendran	IND	Sulfikar Mayoori	BJP	T. P. Jayachandran
Kozhikode	27	Kozhikode North	CPM	Thottathil Raveendran	INC	K. M. Abhijith	BJP	M. T. Ramesh
Kozhikode	28	Kozhikode South	INL	Ahamed Devarkovil	IUML	P. K. Noorbeena Rasheed	BJP	Navya Haridas
Kozhikode	29	Beypore	CPM	P. A. Mohammed Riyas	INC	P. M. Niyas	BJP	K. P. Prakash Babu
Kozhikode	30	Kunnamangalam	IND	P. T. A. Rahim	IND	Dinesh Perumanna	BJP	V. K. Sajeevan
Kozhikode	31	Koduvally	IND	Karat Razak	IUML	M. K. Muneer	BJP	T. Balasoman
Kozhikode	32	Thiruvambady	CPM	Linto Joseph	IUML	C. P. Cheriya Muhammed	BJP	Baby Ambat
Malappuram	33	Kondotty	IND	Sulaiman Haji	IUML	T. V. Ibrahim	BJP	Sheeba Unnikrishnan
Malappuram	34	Eranad	IND	K. T. Abdurahman	IUML	P. K. Basheer	BJP	Dinesh
Malappuram	35	Nilambur	IND	P. V. Anvar	INC	V. V. Prakash	BJP	T. K. Ashok Kumar
Malappuram	36	Wandoor	CPM	P. Midhuna	INC	A. P. Anil Kumar	BJP	P. C. Vijayan
Malappuram	37	Manjeri	CPI	P. Dibona Nassar	IUML	U. A. Latheef	BJP	P. R. Rashmilnath
Malappuram	38	Perinthalmanna	IND	K. P. Musthafa	IUML	Najeeb Kanthapuram	BJP	Suchithra Mattada
Malappuram	39	Mankada	CPM	T. K. Rasheed Ali	IUML	Manjalamkuzhi Ali	BJP	Sajesh Elayil
Malappuram	40	Malappuram	CPM	P. Abdurahman	IUML	P. Ubaidulla	BJP	Sethumadhavan
Malappuram	41	Vengara	CPM	P. Jiji	IUML	P. K. Kunhalikutty	BJP	Preman
Malappuram	42	Vallikunnu	INL	A. P. Abdul Wahab	IUML	P. Abdul Hameed	BJP	Peethambaran Palat
Malappuram	43	Tirurangadi	IND	Niyas Pulikkalakath	IUML	K. P. A. Majeed	BJP	Sathar Haji
Malappuram	44	Tanur	NSC	V. Abdurahman	IUML	P. K. Firos	BJP	Narayanan
Malappuram	45	Tirur	CPM	Gafoor P. Lillis	IUML	Kurukkoli Moideen	BJP	M. Abdul Salam
Malappuram	46	Kottakkal	NCP	N. A. Muhammad Kutty	IUML	K. K. Abid Thangal	BJP	P. P. Ganesan
Malappuram	47	Thavanur	IND	K. T. Jaleel	INC	Firoz Kunnumparambil	BDJS	Ramesh Kottayipuram
Malappuram	48	Ponnani	CPM	P. Nandakumar	INC	A. M. Rohit	BDJS	Subramanian Chungappalli
Palakkad	49	Thrithala	CPM	M. B. Rajesh	INC	V. T. Balram	BJP	Sanku T. Das
Palakkad	50	Pattambi	CPI	Muhammed Muhsin	INC	Riyas Mukkoli	BJP	K. M. Haridas
Palakkad	51	Shornur	CPM	P. Mammikutty	INC	T. H. Feroz Babu	BJP	G. Sandeep Warrier
Palakkad	52	Ottapalam	CPM	K. Premkumar	INC	P. Sarin	BJP	P. Venugopal
Palakkad	53	Kongad	CPM	K. Shanthakumari	IUML	U. C. Raman	BJP	M. Suresh Babu
Palakkad	54	Mannarkkad	CPI	K. P. Suresh Raj	IUML	N. Shamsudheen	ADMK	B. Naseema
Palakkad	55	Malampuzha	CPM	A. Prabhakaran	INC	S. K. Ananthakrishnan	BJP	C. Krishnakumar
Palakkad	56	Palakkad	CPM	C. P. Pramod	INC	Shafi Parambil	BJP	E. Sreedharan
Palakkad	57	Tarur	CPM	P. P. Sumod	INC	K. A. Sheeba	BJP	K. P. Jayaprakash
Palakkad	58	Chittur	JD(S)	K. Krishnankutty	INC	Sumesh Achuthan	BJP	V. Natesan
Palakkad	59	Nenmara	CPM	K. Babu	CMP	C. N. Vijayakrishnan	BDJS	A. N. Anurag
Palakkad	60	Alathur	CPM	K. D. Prasenan	INC	Palayam Pradeep	BJP	Prashanth Sivan
Thrissur	61	Chelakkara	CPM	K. Radhakrishnan	INC	C. C. Sreekumar	BJP	Shajumon Vattekkad
Thrissur	62	Kunnamkulam	CPM	A. C. Moideen	INC	K. Jayasankar	BJP	K. K. Aneeshkumar
Thrissur	63	Guruvayur	CPM	N. K. Akbar	IUML	K. N. A. Khader	DSJP	Dileep Nair*
Thrissur	64	Manalur	CPM	Murali Perunelly	INC	Vijay Hari	BJP	A. N. Radhakrishnan
Thrissur	65	Wadakkanchery	CPM	Xavier Chittilappilly	INC	Anil Akkara	BJP	T. S. Ullas Babu
Thrissur	66	Ollur	CPI	K. Rajan	INC	Jose Valloor	BJP	B. Gopalakrishnan
Thrissur	67	Thrissur	CPI	P. Balachandran	INC	Padmaja Venugopal	BJP	Suresh Gopi
Thrissur	68	Nattika	CPI	C. C. Mukundan	INC	Sunil Lalur	BJP	A. K. Lochanan
Thrissur	69	Kaipamangalam	CPI	E. T. Taison	INC	Sobha Subin	BDJS	C. D. Srilal
Thrissur	70	Irinjalakuda	CPM	R. Bindu	KEC	Thomas Unniyadan	BJP	Jacob Thomas
Thrissur	71	Puthukkad	CPM	K. K. Ramachandran	INC	Sunil Anthikad	BJP	A. Nagesh
Thrissur	72	Chalakudy	KC(M)	Dennis Antony	INC	T. J. Saneesh Joseph	BDJS	Unnikrishnan
Thrissur	73	Kodungallur	CPI	V. R. Sunil Kumar	INC	M. P. Jackson	BJP	Santhosh Chirakulam
Ernakulam	74	Perumbavoor	KC(M)	Babu Joseph	INC	Eldhose Kunnappillyx	BJP	T. P. Sindhu Mol
Ernakulam	75	Angamaly	JD(S)	Jose Thettayil	INC	Roji M. John	BJP	K. V. Sabu
Ernakulam	76	Aluva	CPM	Shelna Nishad	INC	Anwar Sadath	BJP	M. N. Gopi
Ernakulam	77	Kalamassery	CPM	P. Rajeev	IUML	V. E. Gafoor	BDJS	P. S. Jayarajan
Ernakulam	78	Paravur	CPI	M. T. Nixon	INC	V. D. Satheesan	BDJS	A. B. Jayaprakash
Ernakulam	79	Vypin	CPM	K. N. Unnikrishnan	INC	Deepak Joy	BJP	K. S. Shyju
Ernakulam	80	Kochi	CPM	K. J. Maxi	INC	Tony Chammany	BJP	C. G. Rajagopal
Ernakulam	81	Thrippunithura	CPM	M. Swaraj	INC	K. Babu	BJP	K. S. Radhakrishnan
Ernakulam	82	Ernakulam	IND	Shaji George	INC	T. J. Vinod	BJP	Padmaja S. Menon
Ernakulam	83	Thrikkakara	CPM	J. Jacob	INC	P. T. Thomas	BJP	S. Saji
Ernakulam	84	Kunnathunad	CPM	P. V. Sreejin	INC	V. P. Sajeendran	BJP	Renu Suresh
Ernakulam	85	Piravom	KC(M)	Sindhumol Jacob	KC(J)	Anoop Jacob	BJP	M. A. Ashish
Ernakulam	86	Muvattupuzha	CPI	Eldo Abraham	INC	Mathew Kuzhalnadan	BJP	Jiji Joseph
Ernakulam	87	Kothamangalam	CPM	Antony John	KEC	Shibu Thekkumpuram	BDJS	Shine K. Krishnan
Idukki	88	Devikulam	CPM	A. Raja	INC	D. Kumar	ADMK	S. Ganeshan*
Idukki	89	Udumbanchola	CPM	M. M. Mani	INC	E. M. Augusthy	BDJS	Santhosh Madhavan
Idukki	90	Thodupuzha	KC(M)	K. I. Antony	KEC	P. J. Joseph	BJP	P. Shyam Raj
Idukki	91	Idukki	KC(M)	Roshy Augustine	KEC	Francis George	BDJS	Sangeetha Viswanathan
Idukki	92	Peerumade	CPI	Vazhoor Soman	INC	Syriac Thomas	BJP	Srinagari Rajan
Kottayam	93	Pala	KC(M)	Jose K. Mani	IND	Mani C. Kappan	BJP	Prameela Devi
Kottayam	94	Kaduthuruthy	KC(M)	Stephen George	KEC	Monce Joseph	BJP	G. Lijinlal
Kottayam	95	Vaikom	CPI	C. K. Asha	INC	P. R. Sona	BDJS	Ajitha Sabu
Kottayam	96	Ettumanoor	CPM	V. N. Vasavan	KEC	Prince Lukose	BJP	T. N. Harikumar
Kottayam	97	Kottayam	CPM	K. Anilkumar	INC	T. Radhakrishnan	BJP	Minerva Mohan
Kottayam	98	Puthuppally	CPM	Jaick C. Thomas	INC	Oommen Chandy	BJP	N. Hari
Kottayam	99	Changanassery	KC(M)	Job Michael	KEC	V. J. Laly	BJP	G. Raman Nair
Kottayam	100	Kanjirappally	KC(M)	N. Jayaraj	INC	Joseph Vazhackan	BJP	Alphons Kannanthanam
Kottayam	101	Poonjar	KC(M)	Sebastian Kulathunkal	INC	Tomy Kallany	BDJS	M. P. Sen
Alappuzha	102	Aroor	CPM	Daleema Jojo	INC	Shanimol Usman	BDJS	Aniyappan
Alappuzha	103	Cherthala	CPI	P. Prasad	INC	S. Sarath	BDJS	P. S. Jyothis
Alappuzha	104	Alappuzha	CPM	P. P. Chitharanjan	INC	K. S. Manoj	BJP	R. Sandeep Vachaspathi
Alappuzha	105	Ambalappuzha	CPM	H. Salam	INC	M. Liju	BJP	Anoop Antony Joseph
Alappuzha	106	Kuttanad	NCP	Thomas K. Thomas	KEC	Jacob Abraham	BDJS	Thampi Mettuthara
Alappuzha	107	Haripad	CPI	R. Sajilal	INC	Ramesh Chennithala	BJP	K. Soman
Alappuzha	108	Kayamkulam	CPM	U. Prathibha	INC	Aritha Babu	BDJS	Pradeep Lal
Alappuzha	109	Mavelikara	CPM	M. S. Arun Kumar	INC	K. K. Shaju	BJP	Sanju
Alappuzha	110	Chengannur	CPM	Saji Cherian	INC	M. Murali	BJP	M. V. Gopakumar
Pathanamthitta	111	Thiruvalla	JD(S)	Mathew T. Thomas	KEC	Kunju Koshy Paul	BJP	Ashokan Kulanada
Pathanamthitta	112	Ranni	KC(M)	Pramod Narayan	INC	Ringoo Cherian	BDJS	K. Padmakumar
Pathanamthitta	113	Aranmula	CPM	Veena George	INC	K. Sivadasan Nair	BJP	Biju Mathew
Pathanamthitta	114	Konni	CPM	K. U. Jenish Kumar	INC	Robin Peter	BJP	K. Surendran
Pathanamthitta	115	Adoor	CPI	Chittayam Gopakumar	INC	M. G. Kannan	BJP	Pandalam Prathapan
Kollam	116	Karunagapally	CPI	R. Ramachandran	INC	C. R. Mahesh	BJP	Bitty Sudheer
Kollam	117	Chavara	IND	Sujith Vijayan	RSP	Shibu Baby John	BJP	Vivek Gopan
Kollam	118	Kunnathur	IND	Kovoor Kunjumon	RSP	Ullas Kovoor	BJP	Raji Prasad
Kollam	119	Kottarakkara	CPM	K. N. Balagopal	INC	R. Resmi	BJP	Vayakkal Soman
Kollam	120	Pathanapuram	KC(B)	K. B. Ganesh Kumar	INC	Jyothikumar Chamakkala	BJP	Jithin Dev
Kollam	121	Punalur	CPI	P. S. Supal	IUML	Abdurahman Randathani	BJP	Ayoor Murali
Kollam	122	Chadayamangalam	CPI	J. Chinchu Rani	INC	M. M. Naseer	BJP	Vishnu Pattathanam
Kollam	123	Kundara	CPM	J. Mercykutty Amma	INC	P. C. Vishnunath	BDJS	Vanaja Vidyadharan
Kollam	124	Kollam	CPM	Mukesh	INC	Bindhu Krishna	BJP	M. Sunil
Kollam	125	Eravipuram	CPM	M. Noushad	RSP	Babu Divakaran	BDJS	Ranjith Raveendran
Kollam	126	Chathannoor	CPI	G. S. Jayalal	INC	Peethambara Kurup	BJP	B. B. Gopakumar
Thiruvananthapuram	127	Varkala	CPM	V. Joy	INC	B. R. M. Shafeer	BDJS	S. R. M. Aji
Thiruvananthapuram	128	Attingal	CPM	O. S. Ambika	RSP	A. Sreedharan	BJP	P. Sudheer
Thiruvananthapuram	129	Chirayinkeezhu	CPI	V. Sasi	INC	B. S. Anup	BJP	Ashanath
Thiruvananthapuram	130	Nedumangad	CPI	G. R. Anil	INC	P. S. Prasanth	BJP	J. R. Padmakumar
Thiruvananthapuram	131	Vamanapuram	CPM	D. K. Murali	INC	Anad Jayan	BDJS	Thazhava Sahadevan
Thiruvananthapuram	132	Kazhakkoottam	CPM	Kadakampally Surendran	INC	S. S. Lal	BJP	Shobha Surendran
Thiruvananthapuram	133	Vattiyoorkavu	CPM	V. K. Prasanth	INC	Veena S. Nair	BJP	V. V. Rajesh
Thiruvananthapuram	134	Thiruvananthapuram	JKC	Antony Raju	INC	V. S. Sivakumar	BJP	Krishna Kumar
Thiruvananthapuram	135	Nemom	CPM	V. Sivankutty	INC	K. Muraleedharan	BJP	Kummanam Rajasekharan
Thiruvananthapuram	136	Aruvikkara	CPM	G. Stephen	INC	K. S. Sabarinathan	BJP	C. Sivankutty
Thiruvananthapuram	137	Parassala	CPM	C. K. Hareendran	INC	Ansajitha Ressal	BJP	Karamana Jayan
Thiruvananthapuram	138	Kattakkada	CPM	I. B. Sathish	INC	Malayinkeezhu Venugopal	BJP	P. K. Krishnadas
Thiruvananthapuram	139	Kovalam	JD(S)	Neelalohithadasan Nadar	INC	M. Vincent	BJP	V. Chandrasekharan
Thiruvananthapuram	140	Neyyattinkara	CPM	K. Ansalan	INC	R. Selvaraj	BJP	Rajasekharan S. Nair
