= Results of the 2021 Kerala Legislative Assembly election =

The following is the performance of candidates from major alliances of the 2021

Kerala Legislative Assembly election, namely the candidates from the Left Democratic Front (LDF), United Democratic Front (UDF) and National Democratic Alliance (NDA).

Number	Constituency	District	UDF candidate|UDF candidate	Party	Votes	LDF candidate	Party	Votes	NDA candidate	Party	Votes	Winner	Margin	Winning party	Winning Alliance
1	Manjeshwaram	Kasaragod	A. K. M. Ashraf	IUML	65758	V. V. Rameshan	CPI(M)	40639	K. Surendran	BJP	65013	A. K. M. Ashraf	745	IUML	UDF
2	Kasargod	Kasaragod	N. A. Nellikkunnu	IUML	63296	M. A. Latheef	INL	28323	K. Sreekanth	BJP	50395	N. A. Nellikkunnu	12901	IUML	UDF
3	Udma	Kasaragod	Periya Balakrishnan	INC	65342	C. H. Kunhambu	CPI(M)	78664	A. Velayudhan	BJP	20360	C. H. Kunhambu	13322	CPI(M)	LDF
4	Kanhangad	Kasaragod	P. V. Suresh	INC	57476	E. Chandrasekharan	CPI	84615	M. Balraj	BJP	21570	E. Chandrasekharan	27139	CPI	LDF
5	Thrikkaripur	Kasaragod	M. P. Joseph	KC	60014	M. Rajagopal	CPI(M)	86151	T. V. Shibin	BJP	10961	M. Rajagopal	26137	CPI(M)	LDF
6	Payyannur	Kannur	M. Pradeep Kumar	INC	43915	T. I. Madusoodhanan	CPI(M)	93695	K. K. Sreedharan	BJP	11308	T. I. Madusoodhanan	49780	CPI(M)	LDF
7	Kalliasseri	Kannur	Brijesh Kumar	INC	43859	M. Vijin	CPI(M)	88252	Arun Kaithapram	BJP	11365	M. Vijin	44393	CPI(M)	LDF
8	Thaliparamba	Kannur	Abdul Rasheed V. P.	INC	70181	M. V. Govindan	CPI(M)	92870	Gangadharan A. P.	BJP	13058	M. V. Govindan	22689	CPI(M)	LDF
9	Irikkur	Kannur	Sajeev Joseph	INC	76764	Saji Kuttiyanimattom	KC(M)	66754	Aniyamma Rajendran	BJP	7825	Sajeev Joseph	10010	INC	UDF
10	Azhikode	Kannur	K. M. Shaji	IUML	59653	K. V. Sumesh	CPI(M)	65794	K. Ranjith	BJP	15741	K. V. Sumesh	6141	CPI(M)	LDF
11	Kannur	Kannur	Satheeshan Pacheni	INC	58568	Kadannappalli Ramachandran	Con(S)	60313	Archana Vandichal	BJP	11587	Kadannappalli Ramachandran	1745	Con(S)	LDF
12	Dharmadom	Kannur	C. Raghunath	INC	45399	Pinarayi Vijayan	CPI(M)	95522	C. K. Padmanabhan	BJP	14623	Pinarayi Vijayan	50123	CPI(M)	LDF
13	Thalassery	Kannur	M. P. Aravindakshan	INC	45009	A. N. Shamseer	CPI(M)	81810	No Candidate	NA	NA	A. N. Shamseer	36801	CPI(M)	LDF
14	Kuthuparamba	Kannur	Pottankandi Abdulla	IUML	61085	K. P. Mohanan	LJD	70626	C. Sadanandan Master	BJP	21212	K. P. Mohanan	9541	LJD	LDF
15	Mattannur	Kannur	Illikkal Agasthy	RSP	35166	K. K. Shailaja	CPI(M)	96129	Biju Elakkuzhi	BJP	18223	K. K. Shailaja	60963	CPI(M)	LDF
16	Peravoor	Kannur	Sunny Joseph	INC	66706	Sakeer Hussain	CPI(M)	63534	Smitha Jayamohan	BJP	8943	Sunny Joseph	3172	INC	UDF
17	Mananthavady (ST)	Wayanad	P. K. Jayalakshmi	INC	64767	O. R. Kelu	CPI(M)	74085	Mukundan Palliyara	BJP	13373	O. R. Kelu	9282	CPI(M)	LDF
18	Sulthanbathery (ST)	Wayanad	I. C. Balakrishnan	INC	83002	M. S. Viswanathan	CPI(M)	70894	C. K. Janu	JRS	15462	I. C. Balakrishnan	11822	INC	UDF
19	Kalpetta	Wayanad	T. Siddique	INC	71859	M. V. Shreyams Kumar	LJD	66172	T. M. Subeesh	BJP	14358	T. Siddique	5470	INC	UDF
20	Vatakara	Kozhikode	K. K. Rema	RMPI	65093	Manayath Chandran	LJD	57602	M. Rajesh Kumar	BJP	10225	K. K. Rema	7491	RMPI	UDF
21	Kuttiady	Kozhikode	Parakkal Abdulla	IUML	79810	K. P. Kunhahammed Kutty	CPI(M)	80143	P. P. Murali	BJP	9139	K. P. Kunhahammed Kutty	333	CPI(M)	LDF
22	Nadapuram	Kozhikode	K.Praveen Kumar	INC	76902	E. K. Vijayan	CPI	80287	M. P. Rajan	BJP	10290	E. K. Vijayan	3385	CPI	LDF
23	Koyilandy	Kozhikode	N. Subramanian	INC	67156	Kanathil Jameela	CPI(M)	75628	N. P. Radhakrishnan	BJP	17555	Kanathil Jameela	8472	CPI(M)	LDF
24	Perambra	Kozhikode	C. H. Ibrahimkutty	Ind.	63431	T. P. Ramakrishnan	CPI(M)	86023	K. V. Sudheer	BJP	11165	T. P. Ramakrishnan	22592	CPI(M)	LDF
25	Balusseri (SC)	Kozhikode	Dharmajan Bolgatty	INC	71467	K. M. Sachin Dev	CPI(M)	91839	Libin Bhaskar	BJP	16490	K. M. Sachin Dev	20372	CPI(M)	LDF
26	Elathur	Kozhikode	Sulfikar Mayoori	Ind.	45137	A. K. Saseendran	NCP	83639	T. P. Jayachandran	BJP	32010	A. K. Saseendran	38502	NCP	LDF
27	Kozhikode North	Kozhikode	K. M. Abhijith	INC	46196	Thottathil Raveendran	CPI(M)	59124	M. T. Ramesh	BJP	30952	Thottathil Raveendran	12928	CPI(M)	LDF
28	KozhikodebSouth	Kozhikode	P. K. Noorbeena Rasheed	IUML	40098	Ahamed Devarkovil	INL	52557	Navya Haridas	BJP	24873	Ahamed Devarkovil	12459	INL	LDF
29	Beypore	Kozhikode	P. M. Niyas	INC	53418	P. A. Mohammed Riyas	CPI(M)	82165	K. P. Prakash Babu	BJP	26267	P. A. Mohammed Riyas	28747	CPI(M)	LDF
30	Kunnamangalam	Kozhikode	Dinesh Perumanna	Ind.	74862	P. T. A. Rahim	Ind.	85138	V. K. Sajeevan	BJP	27672	P. T. A. Rahim	10276	Ind.	LDF
31	Koduvally	Kozhikode	M. K. Muneer	IUML	72336	Karat Razak	Ind.	65992	T. Balasoman	BJP	9498	M. K. Muneer	6344	IUML	UDF
32	Thiruvambadi	Kozhikode	C. P. Cheriya Muhammed	IUML	63224	Linto Joseph	CPI(M)	67867	Baby Ambat	BJP	7794	Linto Joseph	4643	CPI(M)	LDF
33	Kondotty	Malappuram	T. V. Ibrahim	IUML	80597	Sulaiman Haji	Ind.	62884	Sheeba Unnikrishnan	BJP	10723	T. V. Ibrahim	17713	IUML	UDF
34	Eranad	Malappuram	P. K. Basheer	IUML	78076	K. T. Abdurahman	Ind.	55530	Dinesh	BJP	6683	P. K. Basheer	22546	IUML	UDF
35	Nilambur	Malappuram	V. V. Prakash	INC	78527	P. V. Anvar	Ind.	81227	T. K. Ashok Kumar	BJP	8595	P. V. Anvar	2700	Ind.	LDF
36	Wandoor (SC)	Malappuram	A. P. Anil Kumar	INC	87415	P. Midhuna	CPI(M)	71852	P. C. Vijayan	BJP	7057	A. P. Anil Kumar	15563	INC	UDF
37	Manjeri	Malappuram	U. A. Latheef	IUML	78836	P. Dibona Nassar	CPI	64263	P. R. Rashmilnath	BJP	11350	U. A. Latheef	14573	IUML	UDF
38	Perinthalmanna	Malappuram	Najeeb Kanthapuram	IUML	76530	K. P. Mustafa	Ind.	76492	Suchithra Mattada	BJP	8021	Najeeb Kanthapuram	38	IUML	UDF
39	Mankada	Malappuram	Manjalamkuzhi Ali	IUML	83231	T. K. Rasheed Ali	CPI(M)	76985	Sajesh Elayil	BJP	6641	Manjalamkuzhi Ali	6246	IUML	UDF
40	Malappuram	Malappuram	P. Ubaidulla	IUML	93166	P. Abdurahman	CPI(M)	57958	Sethumadhavan	BJP	5883	P. Ubaidulla	35208	IUML	UDF
41	Vengara	Malappuram	P. K. Kunhalikutty	IUML	70193	P. Jiji	CPI(M)	39671	Preman	BJP	5938	P. K. Kunhalikutty	30522	IUML	UDF
42	Vallikunnu	Malappuram	P. Abdul Hameed	IUML	71823	A. P. Abdul Wahab	INL	57707	Peethambaran Palat	BJP	19853	P. Abdul Hameed	14116	IUML	UDF
43	Tirurangadi	Malappuram	K. P. A. Majeed	IUML	73499	Niyas Pulikkalakath	Ind.	63921	Sathar Haji	BJP	8314	K. P. A. Majeed	9578	IUML	UDF
44	Tanur	Malappuram	P. K. Firos	IUML	69719	V. Abdurahman	NSC	70704	Narayanan	BJP	10590	V. Abdurahman	985	NSC	LDF
45	Tirur	Malappuram	Kurukkoli Moideen	IUML	85314	Ghafoor P. Lillis	CPI(M)	75100	M. Abdul Salam	BJP	9097	Kurukkoli Moideen	7214	IUML	UDF
46	Kottakkal	Malappuram	K. K. Abid Hussain Thangal	IUML	81700	N. A. Muhammad Kutty	NCP	65112	P. P. Ganesan	BJP	10796	K. K. Abid Hussain Thangal	16588	IUML	UDF
47	Thavanur	Malappuram	Firoz Kunnumparambil	INC	67794	K. T. Jaleel	Ind.	70358	Ramesh Kottayipuram	BDJS	9914	K. T. Jaleel	2564	Ind.	LDF
48	Ponnani	Malappuram	A. M. Rohit	INC	57625	P. Nandakumar	CPI(M)	74668	Subrahmanian Chungappalli	BDJS	7419	P. Nandakumar	17043	CPI(M)	LDF
49	Thrithala	Palakkad	V. T. Balram	INC	66798	M. B. Rajesh	CPI(M)	69814	Sanku T. Das	BJP	12851	M. B. Rajesh	3016	CPI(M)	LDF
50	Pattambi	Palakkad	Riyas Mukkoli	INC	57337	Muhammed Muhsin	CPI	75311	K. M. Haridas	BJP	14578	Muhammed Muhsin	17974	CPI	LDF
51	Shornur	Palakkad	T. H. Feroz Babu	INC	37726	P. Mammikutty	CPI(M)	74400	G. Sandeep Warrier	BJP	36973	P. Mammikutty	36674	CPI(M)	LDF
52	Ottappalam	Palakkad	P. Sarin	INC	59707	K. Premkumar	CPI(M)	74859	P. Venugopal	BJP	25056	K. Premkumar	15152	CPI(M)	LDF
53	Kongad (SC)	Palakkad	U. C. Raman	IUML	40662	K. Shanthakumari	CPI(M)	67881	M. Suresh Babu	BJP	27661	K. Shanthakumari	27219	CPI(M)	LDF
54	Mannarkkad	Palakkad	N. Shamsudheen	IUML	71657	K. P. Suresh Raj	CPI	65787	B. Naseema	AIADMK	10376	N. Shamsudheen	5870	IUML	UDF
55	Malampuzha	Palakkad	S. K. Anandakrishnan	INC	35444	A. Prabhakaran	CPI(M)	75934	C. Krishnakumar	BJP	50200	A. Prabhakaran	25734	CPI(M)	LDF
56	Palakkad	Palakkad	Shafi Parambil	INC	54079	C. P. Pramod	CPI(M)	36433	E. Sreedharan	BJP	50220	Shafi Parambil	3859	INC	UDF
57	Tarur (SC)	Palakkad	K. A. Sheeba	INC	43213	P. P. Sumod	CPI(M)	67744	K. P. Jayaprakash	BJP	18465	P. P. Sumod	24531	CPI(M)	LDF
58	Chittur	Palakkad	Sumesh Achuthan	INC	50794	K. Krishnankutty	JD(S)	84672	V. Natesan	BJP	14458	K. Krishnankutty	33878	JD(S)	LDF
59	Nenmara	Palakkad	C. N. Vijayakrishnan	CMP(J)	51441	K. Babu	CPI(M)	80145	A. N. Anurag	BDJS	16666	K. Babu	28074	CPI(M)	LDF
60	Alathur	Palakkad	Palayam Predeep	INC	40535	K. D. Prasenan	CPI(M)	74653	Prashanth Sivan	BJP	18349	K. D. Prasenan	34118	CPI(M)	LDF
61	Chelakkara (SC)	Thrissur	C. C. Sreekumar	INC	44015	K. Radhakrishnan	CPI(M)	83415	Shajumon Vattekkad	BJP	24045	K. Radhakrishnan	39400	CPI(M)	LDF
62	Kunnamkulam	Thrissur	K. Jayasankar	INC	48901	A. C. Moideen	CPI(M)	75532	K. K. Aneeshkumar	BJP	27833	A. C. Moideen	26631	CPI(M)	LDF
63	Guruvayoor	Thrissur	K. N. A. Khader	IUML	58804	N. K. Akbar	CPI(M)	77072	Dileep Nair*	DSJP	6294	N. K. Akbar	18268	CPI(M)	LDF
64	Manalur	Thrissur	Vijay Hari	INC	48461	Murali Perunelly	CPI(M)	78337	A. N. Radhakrishnan	BJP	36566	Murali Perunelly	29876	CPI(M)	LDF
65	Wadakkanchery	Thrissur	Anil Akkara	INC	65858	Xavier Chittilappilly	CPI(M)	81026	T. S. Ullas Babu	BJP	21747	Xavier Chittilappilly	15168	CPI(M)	LDF
66	Ollur	Thrissur	Jose Valloor	INC	55151	K. Rajan	CPI	76657	B. Gopalakrishnan	BJP	22295	K. Rajan	21506	CPI	LDF
67	Thrissur	Thrissur	Padmaja Venugopal	INC	43317	P. Balachandran	CPI	44263	Suresh Gopi	BJP	40457	P. Balachandran	946	CPI	LDF
68	Nattika (SC)	Thrissur	Sunil Lalur	INC	44499	C. C. Mukundan	CPI	72930	A. K. Lochanan	BJP	33716	C. C. Mukundan	28431	CPI	LDF
69	Kaipamangalam	Thrissur	Sobha Subin	INC	50463	E. T. Taison	CPI	73161	C. D. Srilal	BDJS	9066	E. T. Taison	22698	CPI	LDF
70	Irinjalakuda	Thrissur	Thomas Unniyadan	KC	56544	R. Bindu	CPI(M)	62493	Jacob Thomas	BJP	34329	R. Bindu	5949	CPI(M)	LDF
71	Puthukkad	Thrissur	Sunil Anthikad	INC	46012	K. K. Ramachandran	CPI(M)	73365	A. Nagesh	BJP	34893	K. K. Ramachandran	27353	CPI(M)	LDF
72	Chalakudy	Thrissur	T. J. Saneesh Kumar Joseph	INC	61888	Dennis Antony	KC(M)	60831	Unnikrishnan	BDJS	17301	T. J. Saneesh Kumar Joseph	1057	INC	UDF
73	Kodungallur	Thrissur	M. P. Jackson	INC	47564	V. R. Sunil Kumar	CPI	71457	Santhosh Chirakulam	BJP	28204	V. R. Sunil Kumar	23893	CPI	LDF
74	Perumbavoor	Ernakulam	Eldhose Kunnappilly	INC	53484	Babu Joseph	KC(M)	50585	T. P. Sindhu Mol	BJP	15135	Eldhose Kunnappilly	2899	INC	UDF
75	Angamaly	Ernakulam	Roji M. John	INC	71562	Jose Thettayil	JD(S)	55633	K. V. Sabu	BJP	8677	Roji M. John	15929	INC	UDF
76	Aluva	Ernakulam	Anwar Sadath	INC	73703	Shelna Nishad	CPI(M)	54817	M. N. Gopi	BJP	15893	Anwar Sadath	18886	INC	UDF
77	Kalamassery	Ernakulam	V. E. Gafoor	IUML	61805	P. Rajeev	CPI(M)	77141	P. S. Jayarajan	BDJS	11179	P. Rajeev	15336	CPI(M)	LDF
78	Paravur	Ernakulam	V. D. Satheesan	INC	82264	M. T. Nixon	CPI	60963	A. B. Jayaprakash	BDJS	12964	V. D. Satheesan	21301	INC	UDF
79	Vypin	Ernakulam	Deepak Joy	INC	45657	K. N. Unnikrishnan	CPI(M)	53858	K. S. Shyju	BJP	13540	K. N. Unnikrishnan	8201	CPI(M)	LDF
80	Kochi	Ernakulam	Tony Chammany	INC	40553	K. J. Maxi	CPI(M)	54632	C.G. Rajagopal	BJP	10991	K. J. Maxi	14079	CPI(M)	LDF
81	Thripunithura	Ernakulam	K. Babu	INC	65875	M. Swaraj	CPI(M)	64883	K. S. Radhakrishnan	BJP	23756	K. Babu	992	INC	UDF
82	Ernakulam	Ernakulam	T. J. Vinod	INC	45390	Shaji George	Ind.	34960	Padmaja S. Menon	BJP	16043	T. J. Vinod	10970	INC	UDF
83	Thrikkakara	Ernakulam	P. T. Thomas	INC	59839	J. Jacob	CPI(M)	45510	S. Saji	BJP	15483	P. T. Thomas	14329	INC	UDF
84	Kunnathunad (SC)	Ernakulam	V. P. Sajeendran	INC	49636	P. V. Sreejin	CPI(M)	52351	Renu Suresh	BJP	7218	P. V. Sreejin	2715	CPI(M)	LDF
85	Piravom	Ernakulam	Anoop Jacob	KC(J)	85056	Sindhumol Jacob	KC(M)	59692	M. A. Ashish	BJP	11021	Anoop Jacob	25364	KC(J)	UDF
86	Muvattupuzha	Ernakulam	Mathew Kuzhalnadan	INC	64425	Eldo Abraham	CPI	58264	Jiji Joseph	BJP	7527	Mathew Kuzhalnadan	6161	INC	UDF
87	Kothamangalam	Ernakulam	Shibu Thekkumpuram	KC	57629	Antony John	CPI(M)	64234	Shine K. Krishnan	BDJS	4638	Antony John	6605	CPI(M)	LDF
88	Devikulam (SC)	Idukki	D. Kumar	INC	51201	A. Raja	CPI(M)	59049	S. Ganeshan*	AIADMK	4717	A. Raja	7848	CPI(M)	LDF
89	Udumbanchola	Idukki	E. M. Augusthy	INC	39076	M. M. Mani	CPI(M)	77381	Santhosh Madhavan	BDJS	7208	M. M. Mani	38305	CPI(M)	LDF
90	Thodupuzha	Idukki	P. J. Joseph	KC	67495	K. I. Antony	KC(M)	47236	Shyam Raj P.	BJP	21263	P. J. Joseph	20259	KC	UDF
91	Idukki	Idukki	Francis George	KC	56795	Roshy Augustine	KC(M)	62368	Sangeetha Viswanathan	BDJS	9286	Roshy Augustine	5573	KC(M)	LDF
92	Peerumede	Idukki	Syriac Thomas	INC	58306	Vazhoor Soman	CPI	60141	Srinagari Rajan	BJP	7126	Vazhoor Soman	1835	CPI	LDF
93	Pala	Kottayam	Mani C. Kappan	Ind.	69804	Jose K. Mani	KC(M)	54418	Prameela Devi	BJP	10869	Mani C. Kappan	15386	Ind.	UDF
94	Kaduthuruthy	Kottayam	Monce Joseph	KC	59666	Stephen George	KC(M)	55410	Lijinlal G.	BJP	11670	Monce Joseph	4256	KC	UDF
95	Vaikom (SC)	Kottayam	P. R. Sona	INC	42266	C. K. Asha	CPI	71388	Ajitha Sabu	BDJS	11953	C. K. Asha	29122	CPI	LDF
96	Ettumanoor	Kottayam	Pr INCe Lukose	KC	43986	V. N. Vasavan	CPI(M)	58289	T. N. Harikumar	BJP	13746	V. N. Vasavan	14303	CPI(M)	LDF
97	Kottayam	Kottayam	Thiruvanchoor Radhakrishnan	INC	65401	K. Anilkumar	CPI(M)	46658	Minerva Mohan	BJP	8611	Thiruvanchoor Radhakrishnan	18743	INC	UDF
98	Puthuppally	Kottayam	Oommen Chandy	INC	63372	Jaick C. Thomas	CPI(M)	54328	N. Hari	BJP	11694	Oommen Chandy	9044	INC	UDF
99	Changanassery	Kottayam	V. J. Laly	KC	49366	Job Michael	KC(M)	55425	G. Raman Nair	BJP	14491	Job Michael	6059	KC(M)	LDF
100	Kanjirappally	Kottayam	Joseph Vazhackan	INC	46596	N. Jayaraj	KC(M)	60299	Alphons Kannanthanam	BJP	29157	N. Jayaraj	13703	KC(M)	LDF
101	Poonjar	Kottayam	Tomy Kallany	INC	34633	Sebastian Kulathunkal	KC(M)	58668	M. P. Sen	BDJS	2965	Sebastian Kulathunkal	16817	KC(M)	LDF
102	Aroor	Alappuzha	Shanimol Usman	INC	66804	Daleema Jojo	CPI(M)	73626	Aniyappan	BDJS	17215	Daleema Jojo	6802	CPI(M)	LDF
103	Cherthala	Alappuzha	S. Sarath	INC	77554	P. Prasad	CPI	83702	P. S. Jyothis	BDJS	14254	P. Prasad	6148	CPI	LDF
104	Alappuzha	Alappuzha	K. S. Manoj	INC	61768	P. P. Chitharanjan	CPI(M)	73412	R. Sandeep Vachaspathi	BJP	21650	P. P. Chitharanjan	11644	CPI(M)	LDF
105	Ambalappuzha	Alappuzha	M. Liju	INC	50240	H. Salam	CPI(M)	61365	Anoop Antony Joseph	BJP	22389	H. Salam	11125	CPI(M)	LDF
106	Kuttanad	Alappuzha	Jacob Abraham	KC	51863	Thomas K. Thomas	NCP	57379	Thampi Mettuthara	BDJS	14946	Thomas K. Thomas	5516	NCP	LDF
107	Haripad	Alappuzha	Ramesh Chennithala	INC	72768	R. Sajilal	CPI	59102	K. Soman	BJP	17890	Ramesh Chennithala	13666	INC	UDF
108	Kayamkulam	Alappuzha	Aritha Babu	INC	71050	U. Prathibha	CPI(M)	77348	Pradeep Lal	BDJS	11413	U. Prathibha	6298	CPI(M)	LDF
109	Mavelikkara (SC)	Alappuzha	K. K. Shaju	INC	47026	M. S. Arun Kumar	CPI(M)	71743	Sanju	BJP	30955	M. S. Arun Kumar	24717	CPI(M)	LDF
110	Chengannur	Alappuzha	M. Murali	INC	39309	Saji Cheriyan	CPI(M)	71293	M. V. Gopakumar	BJP	34493	Saji Cheriyan	31984	CPI(M)	LDF
111	Thiruvalla	Pathanamthitta	Kunju Koshy Paul	KC	50757	Mathew T. Thomas	JD(S)	62178	Ashokan Kulanada	BJP	22674	Mathew T. Thomas	11421	JD(S)	LDF
112	Ranni	Pathanamthitta	Ringoo Cherian	INC	43060	Pramod Narayan	KC(M)	44774	Padmakumar K.	BDJS	16089	Pramod Narayan	1123	KC(M)	LDF
113	Aranmula	Pathanamthitta	K. Sivadasan Nair	INC	55947	Veena George	CPI(M)	74950	Biju Mathew	BJP	29099	Veena George	19003	CPI(M)	LDF
114	Konni	Pathanamthitta	Robin Peter	INC	53810	K. U. Jenish Kumar	CPI(M)	62318	K. Surendran	BJP	32811	K. U. Jenish Kumar	8508	CPI(M)	LDF
115	Adoor (SC)	Pathanamthitta	M. G. Kannan	INC	51064	Chittayam Gopakumar	CPI	54026	Pandalam Prathapan	BJP	20105	Chittayam Gopakumar	2962	CPI	LDF
116	Karunagapally	Kollam	C. R. Mahesh	INC	93932	R. Ramachandran	CPI	64836	Bitty Sudheer	BJP	12031	C. R. Mahesh	29096	INC	UDF
117	Chavara	Kollam	Shibu Baby John	RSP	62186	Sujith Vijayanpillai	Ind.	63282	Vivek Gopan	BJP	14211	Sujith Vijayan	1096	Ind.	LDF
118	Kunnathur (SC)	Kollam	Ullas Kovoor	RSP	66646	Kovoor Kunjumon	Ind.[10]	69436	Raji Prasad	BJP	21760	Kovoor Kunjumon	2790	Ind.[10]	LDF
119	Kottarakkara	Kollam	Resmi R.	INC	57956	K. N. Balagopal	CPI(M)	68770	Vayakkal Soman	BJP	21223	K. N. Balagopal	10814	CPI(M)	LDF
120	Pathanapuram	Kollam	Jyothikumar Chamakkala	INC	52776	K. B. Ganesh Kumar	KC(B)	67078	Jithin Dev	BJP	12364	K. B. Ganesh Kumar	14302	KC(B)	LDF
121	Punalur	Kollam	Abdul Rahman Randathani	IUML	43421	P. S. Supal	CPI	80428	Ayoor Murali	BJP	20069	P. S. Supal	37007	CPI	LDF
122	Chadayamangalam	Kollam	M. M. Naseer	INC	53574	J. Chinchu Rani	CPI	67252	Vishnu Pattathanam	BJP	22238	J. Ch INChu Rani	13678	CPI	LDF
123	Kundara	Kollam	P. C. Vishnunath	INC	76341	J. Mercykutty Amma	CPI(M)	71887	Vanaja Vidyadharan	BDJS	6097	P. C. Vishnunath	4454	INC	UDF
124	Kollam	Kollam	Bindhu Krishna	INC	56452	Mukesh	CPI(M)	58524	M. Sunil	BJP	14252	Mukesh	2072	CPI(M)	LDF
125	Eravipuram	Kollam	Babu Divakaran	RSP	43452	M. Noushad	CPI(M)	71573	Ranjith Raveendran	BDJS	8468	M. Noushad	28121	CPI(M)	LDF
126	Chathannoor	Kollam	Peethambara Kurup	INC	34280	G. S. Jayalal	CPI	59296	B. B. Gopakumar	BJP	42090	G. S. Jayalal	17206	CPI	LDF
127	Varkala	Thiruvananthapuram	B. R. M. Shafeer	INC	50995	V. Joy	CPI(M)	68816	Aji S. R. M.	BDJS	11214	V. Joy	17821	CPI(M)	LDF
128	Attingal (SC)	Thiruvananthapuram	A. Sreedharan	RSP	36938	O. S. Ambika	CPI(M)	69898	P. Sudheer	BJP	38262	O. S. Ambika	31636	CPI(M)	LDF
129	Chirayinkeezhu (SC)	Thiruvananthapuram	Anup B.S.	INC	48617	V. Sasi	CPI	62634	Ashanath	BJP	30986	V. Sasi	14017	CPI	LDF
130	Nedumangad	Thiruvananthapuram	P. S. Prasanth	INC	49433	G. R. Anil	CPI	72742	J. R. Padmakumar	BJP	26861	G. R. Anil	23309	CPI	LDF
131	Vamanapuram	Thiruvananthapuram	Anad Jayan	INC	62895	D. K. Murali	CPI(M)	73137	Thazhava Sahadevan	BDJS	5603	D. K. Murali	10242	CPI(M)	LDF
132	Kazhakoottam	Thiruvananthapuram	S. S. Lal	INC	32995	Kadakampally Surendran	CPI(M)	63690	Shobha Surendran	BJP	40193	Kadakampally Surendran	23497	CPI(M)	LDF
133	Vattiyoorkavu	Thiruvananthapuram	Veena S. Nair	INC	35455	V. K. Prasanth	CPI(M)	61111	V. V. Rajesh	BJP	39596	V. K. Prasanth	21515	CPI(M)	LDF
134	Thiruvananthapuram	Thiruvananthapuram	V. S. Sivakumar	INC	41659	Antony Raju	JKC	48748	Krishna Kumar	BJP	34996	Antony Raju	7089	JKC	LDF
135	Nemom	Thiruvananthapuram	K. Muraleedharan	INC	36524	V. Sivankutty	CPI(M)	55837	Kummanam Rajasekharan	BJP	51888	V. Sivankutty	3949	CPI(M)	LDF
136	Aruvikkara	Thiruvananthapuram	K. S. Sabarinathan	INC	61730	G. Stephen	CPI(M)	66776	C. Sivankutty	BJP	15379	G. Stephen	5046	CPI(M)	LDF
137	Parassala	Thiruvananthapuram	Ansajitha Ressal	INC	52720	C. K. Hareendran	CPI(M)	78548	Karamana Jayan	BJP	29850	C. K. Hareendran	25828	CPI(M)	LDF
138	Kattakada	Thiruvananthapuram	Malayainkeezhu Venugopal	INC	43062	I. B. Sathish	CPI(M)	66293	P. K. Krishnadas	BJP	34642	I. B. Sathish	23231	CPI(M)	LDF
139	Kovalam	Thiruvananthapuram	M. Vinent	INC	74868	Neelalohithadasan Nadar	JD(S)	63306	Vishnupuram Chandrasekharan	KKC	18664	M. Vincent	11562	INC	UDF
140	Neyyattinkara	Thiruvananthapuram	R. Selvaraj	INC	51235	K. Ansalan	CPI(M)	65497	Rajasekharan S Nair	BJP	21009	K. Ansalan	14262	CPI(M)	LDF
