= Kinassery =

Kinassery may refer to:

- Kinassery, Kozhikode
- Kinassery, Palakkad
- Kinassery, Thrissur
