= K. Praveen Kumar =

Indian politician

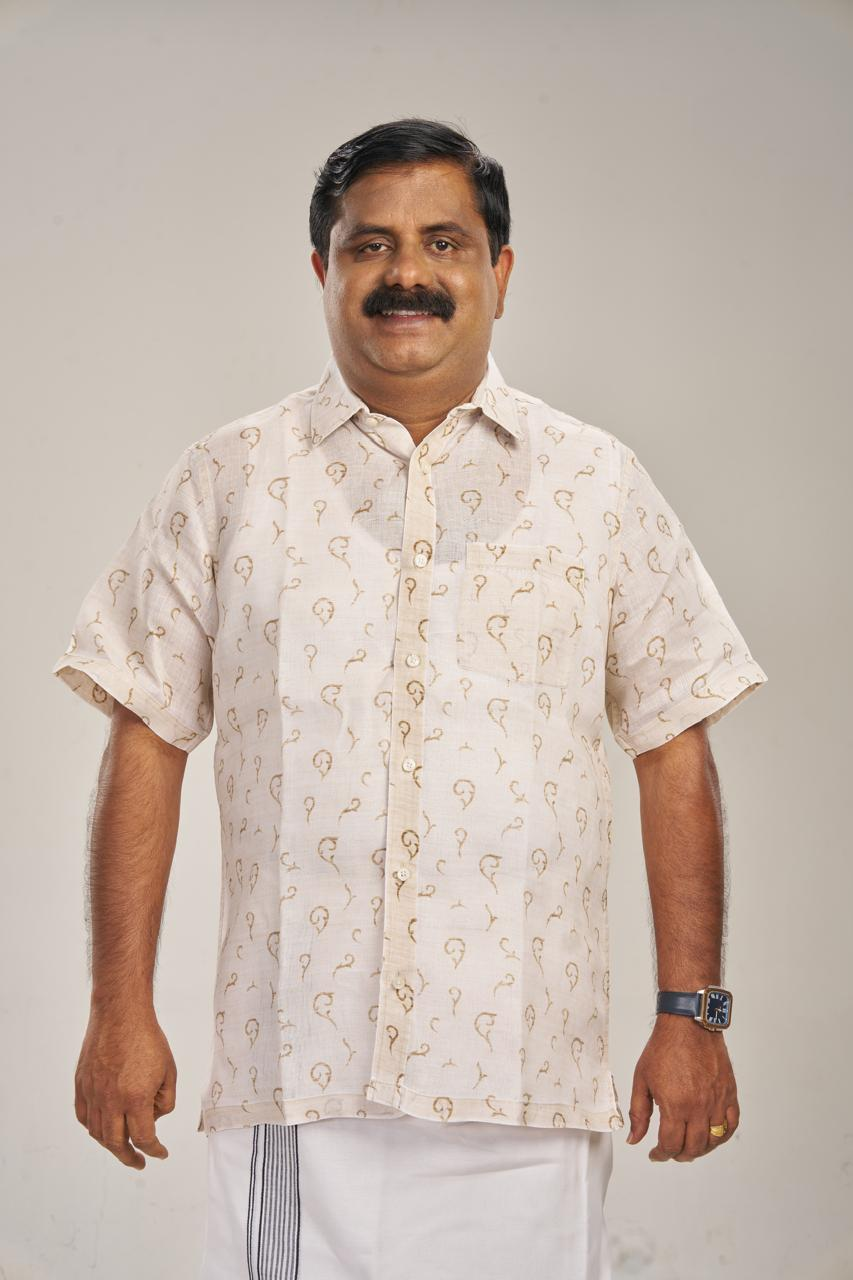

Member of the Kerala Legislative Assembly
- Incumbent
- Assumed office 2026
- Preceded by: Kanathil Jameela
- Constituency: Quilandy

Personal details
- Born: 1970 (age 55–56)
- Party: Indian National Congress
- Spouse: Bijila K. Praveen
- Children: 1
- Parent(s): Keshavan Nair, Shantha Kumari
- Profession: Politician

Kesavan Nair Praveen Kumar is an Indian politician from Kerala. He is a member of the Kerala Legislative Assembly from Quilandy representing the Indian National Congress.

== Early life and education ==
Praveen Kumar was born in Naduvathur, Keezhariyur, to Kesavan Nair and Shantha Kumari. He is an advocate and social worker. Praveen completed his higher education at Vidyavardhaka Law College in Tumkur, Karnataka, where he earned his Bachelor of Arts (BA) and Bachelor of Laws (LLB) degrees from Bangalore University.

== Political career ==
Praveen began his political journey during his student days under the mentorship of the late P. Sankaran, a veteran Congress leader and former Health Minister of Kerala. He rose through the ranks of the party to hold significant leadership roles, most notably serving as the President of the Kozhikode District Congress Committee (DCC). Prior to this, he had also served as a General Secretary of the Kerala Pradesh Congress Committee (KPCC).

In the 2026 Kerala Legislative Assembly election, Praveen contested from the Quilandy seat as the United Democratic Front (Kerala) candidate. He received 79,913 votes and won the election by a margin of 12,070 votes, succeeding the incumbent.

== Personal life ==
Praveen is married to Bijila K, a high school teacher at Thiruvangoor Higher Secondary School in Kozhikode. The couple has a son.
