= Fyzal Babu =

Indian politician

Member of the Kerala Legislative Assembly
- Incumbent
- Assumed office 2026
- Preceded by: Ahamed Devarkovil
- Constituency: Kozhikode South

Personal details
- Born: 1979 (age 46–47)
- Party: Indian Union Muslim League
- Profession: Politician

Fyzal Babu is an Indian politician from Kerala. He is a member of the Kerala Legislative Assembly from Kozhikode South representing the Indian Union Muslim League.

== Early life and education ==
Fyzal Babu is the son of Yahu. He is an advocate by profession. He completed a Master of Arts degree in Sociology from the University of Calicut in 2018 and obtained a Bachelor of Laws degree from Kannur University in 2017.

== Political career ==
Fyzal Babu won the Kozhikode South seat in the 2026 Kerala Legislative Assembly election as a candidate of the Indian Union Muslim League supported by the United Democratic Front. He received 52,680 votes and defeated Ahamed Devarkovil of the Nationalist Congress Party by a margin of 10,795 votes.
