= P. T. A. Rahim =

Indian politician

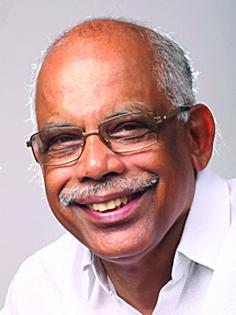

Pro-term Speaker of Kerala Legislative Assembly
- In office 20 May 2021 – 25 May 2021

Member of the Kerala Legislative Assembly
- In office 13 May 2011 – 23 May 2026
- Preceded by: U. C. Raman
- Succeeded by: M. A. Razak Master
- Constituency: Kunnamanglam
- In office 11 May 2006 – 13 May 2011
- Preceded by: C. Mammutty
- Succeeded by: V. M. Ummer
- Constituency: Koduvally

Personal details
- Born: 8 March 1949 (age 77) Koduvally, Madras State, India (present day Koduvally, Kozhikode, Kerala)
- Party: National Secular Conference
- Spouse: Smt. Subaida
- Children: Muhammed Ismail Shabeer, Fathima Shabna & Aysha Shabja
- Website: http://ptarahim.com/

P. T. A. Rahim is an Indian politician from Kerala. He is from the Indian National League. He represented the Kunnamangalam constituency in Kozhikode district and served as Pro-tem Speaker in the Kerala Legislative Assembly in 2021.

== Career ==
Born at Koduvally in Kozhikode district on 8 March 1949, Rahim started his political career through MSF during his college days. He completed a B.Com. degree at Farook College and LLB at Government Law College, Kozhikode. He was secretary of the Indian Union Muslim League Kozhikode District Committee and he was also President of Koduvally Grama Panchayath (1988–1993, 1998–2006). He left the Muslim League in early 2000s and formed Muslim League(R) with his followers. He made a successful movement in the Panachayat election held in 2005 with the support of Left Front in Koduvally.

He became a noted politician when he defeated K. Muraleedharan, the UDF candidate in Koduvally constituency in 2006 elections. In early 2011 with the support of LDF, under the leadership of P. T. A. Rahim a new party, National Secular Conference (NSC) was formed, which aimed to protect the rights of Dalits, religious minorities and other backward sections of people. The party was later merged with Indian National League.

=== Assembly Election Victories ===
Year	Constituency	Won Against	Majority
2021	Kunnamangalam	Dinesh Perumanna	10,276
2016	Kunnamangalam	T. Siddique	11,205
2011	Kunnamangalam	U. C. Raman	3,269
2006	Koduvally	K. Muraleedharan	7,506
