= Dalit League =

Indian Union Dalit League
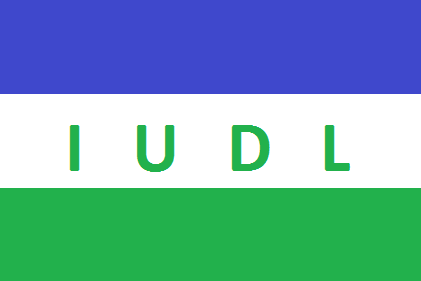
- Leader: U. C. Raman, A. P. Unnikrishnan
- Founder: U. C. Raman
- Headquarters: Kozhikkode, Kerala, India
- Alliance: Indian Union Muslim League; UDF

Dalit League is also known as Indian Union Dalit League (IUDL) Indian Political Party and Caste wing of the Indian Union Muslim League in Kerala, India. It was founded by IUML and A. P. Unnikrishnan, U. C. Raman, As of 2012, the IUDL Kerala State President of U.C. Raman, its state secretary M.P. Gopi and state treasurer Balan.

The Dalit League is active in five districts of the Malabar region. The number of Dalit League representatives in local self-governing bodies of Kerala stands at around 250.

== Leadership ==
=== Kerala ===
Current office bearers
Name	Designation	District
E.P Babu	President	Kozhikkode
Sashidharan Manalaya	General Secretary	Malappuram
S. Kumaran	Treasure	Palakkad
Soman Pothath	Vice President	Kottayam
V.M Suresh Babu	Vice President	Kozhikkode
P. Balan	Vice President	Wayanad
Prakashan Moochikkal	Vice President	Malappuram
Prakashan Paramban	Vice President	Kannur
Sree Devi Prakunnu	Vice President	Malappuram
Afshila	Secretary	Kozhikkode
R. Chandran	Secretary	Wayanad
Kalabhavan Raju	Secretary	Kasargod
K.A Sashi	Secretary	Eranakulam
Velayudhan Manjeri	Secretary	Malappuram
Sajid Vinod	Secretary	Palakkad
Pole M Petor	Secretary	Pathanamthitta

Current office bearers of Women's wing
Name	Designation	District
Jayanthi Rajan	President	Wayanad

== See also ==
- List of political parties in India
