= M. K. Muneer =

Indian politician

Dr. M. K. Muneer
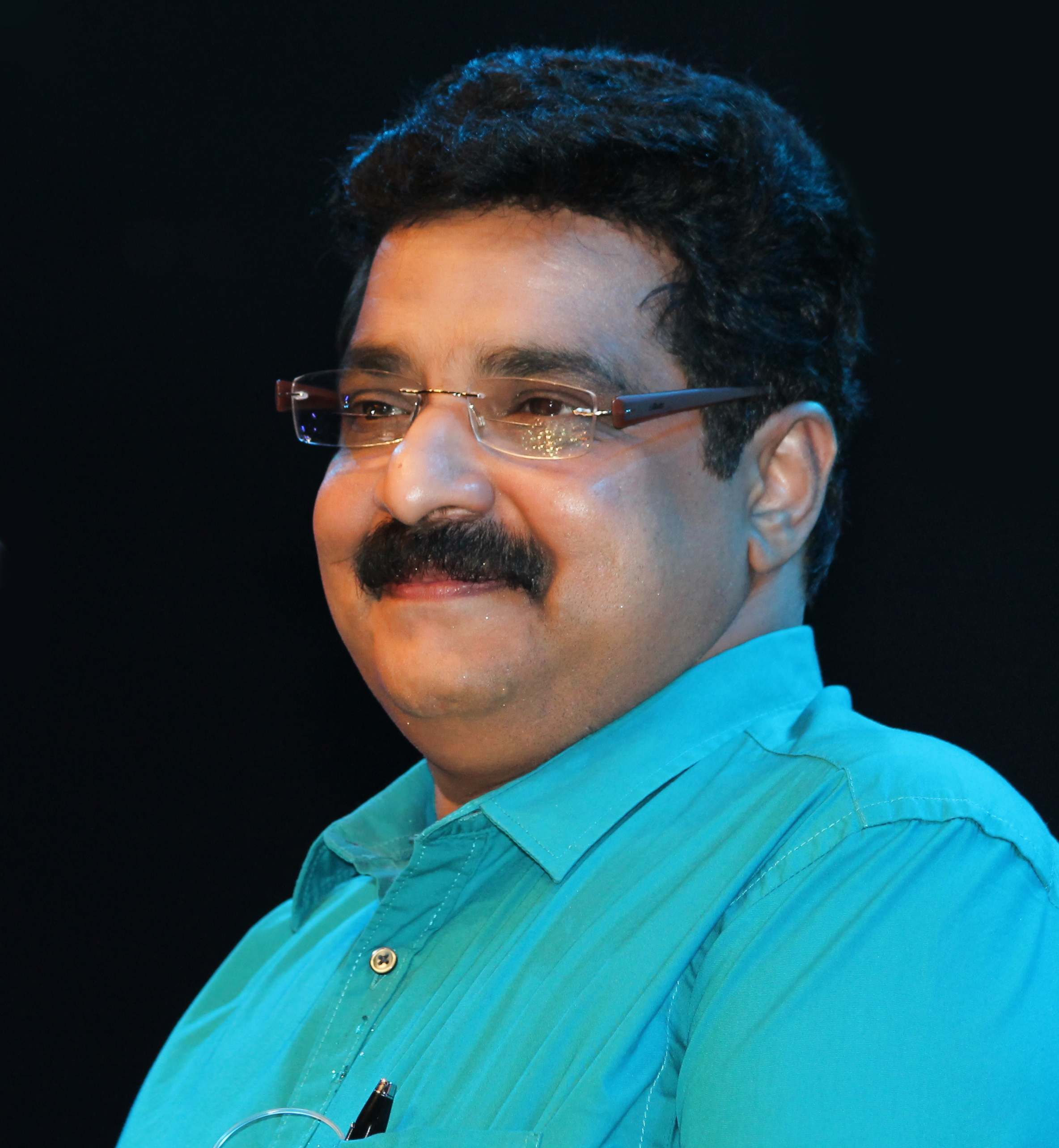

Minister for Social Welfare and Panchayath Affairs, Government of Kerala
- In office 23 May 2011 – 20 May 2016
- Preceded by: Paloli Mohammed Kutty
- Succeeded by: K. T. Jaleel

Deputy Leader of Opposition in Kerala Legislative Assembly
- In office 22 April 2017 – 7 May 2021
- Leader: Ramesh Chennithala
- Preceded by: P. K. Kunhalikutty
- Succeeded by: P. K. Kunhalikutty

Member of Kerala Legislative Assembly
- In office 24 May 2021 – 23 May 2026
- Preceded by: Karat Razak
- Succeeded by: P. K. Firos
- Constituency: Koduvally
- In office 1 June 2011 – 3 May 2021
- Preceded by: constituency created
- Succeeded by: Ahamed Devarkovil
- Constituency: Kozhikode South
- In office 1996–2006
- Preceded by: Younus Kunhu
- Succeeded by: M. Ummer
- Constituency: Malappuram

Minister For Public Works Department, Government of Kerala
- In office 26 May 2001 – 12 May 2006
- Preceded by: P. J. Joseph
- Succeeded by: P. J. Joseph

Personal details
- Born: 26 August 1962 (age 64) Kozhikode, Kerala, India
- Party: Indian Union Muslim League
- Spouse: Nafeesa Vineetha
- Children: Two sons and one daughter
- Education: Government Medical College, Kozhikode

Mohammed Koya Muneer is an Indian politician, physician, social worker, singer, poet currently Administrative Reforms Commission (ARC) Chairman and author from Keralam. He was the Minister for Social Welfare and Panchayat in the last (May 2011 – May 2016) UDF Ministry, headed by Oommen Chandy and represented the Kozhikode South constituency in the legislative assembly. He was also the Minister for Public Works in A K Antony Ministry 3. Muneer is a State secretary of the Indian Union Muslim League and was the Chairman of the Malayalam TV channel Indiavision. He has written ghazals and books including Fascism and the Sangh Parivar. He is a qualified medical doctor and patron of MCC-THAS-Haemophilia Society.

Muneer is the only son amongst the three children of C. H. Mohammed Koya, veteran Muslim League politician and former Chief Minister of Kerala and Amina. In March 2017 he was elected as deputy opposition leader in Kerala Legislative Assembly. He did his MBBS in a private medical college in Karnataka. With a special order by the Government of Kerala post his father's death, he was allowed a transfer to Government Medical College, Kozhikode and eventually completed his course from there. This became a controversy after he questioned the state aid given to a leader from Nationalist Congress Party.

== Minister in different ministries ==
No.	Head of the Ministry	Period	Portfolio
1	A. K. Antony	2001-04	public work dept
2	Oommen Chandy	2004-06	public work dept
3	Oommen Chandy	2011-16	panchyath, social welfare

== Kerala Legislative Assembly election, 2021 ==
In the 2021 Kerala Legislative Assembly election, he contested from Koduvally. He defeated Karat Razack by a margin of 6344 votes.

2016 Kerala Legislative Assembly election: Kozhikode South
Party	Candidate	Votes	%	±%
IUML	M. K. Muneer	49,863	43.13%	
INL	A. P. Abdul Vahab	43,536	37.66%	
BDJS	Satheesh Kuttiyil	19,146	16.56%	
NOTA	None of the above	788	0.68%	
SDPI	U. K. Deysi Balasubrahmanyan	593	0.51%	
BSP	Kamala Pavithran	480	0.42%	
Independent	A. P. Abdul Vahab	287	0.25%	
Independent	A. K. Sajan	227	0.20%	
Independent	Abdul Sathar	211	0.18%	
Independent	Muneer Davari	190	0.16%	
Independent	Premanand T.	166	0.14%	
Independent	Abdul Muneer	130	0.11%	
Margin of victory		6,327	5.47%	
Turnout		1,15,617	77.57%	
IUML hold		Swing		

== Controversies ==
Muneer put a pro-LGBTQ post in Facebook during the pride month in 2021, only to be withdrawn later following severe criticism from party members. Once popular as the progressive face of IUML, Muneer later became a staunch supporter of patriarchal and conservative form of Islam. His strange argument that gender neutrality will make POCSO Act redundant stirred up a massive political controversy. More recently, he is known for delivering negative speeches against the LGBT+ community including a controversial article published in Suprabhatam daily where he accused homosexuals of being violent and demanding rights for child sex abuse. Despite being a former Minister who implemented transgender policy in Kerala; for the first time in an Indian state, Muneer stirred controversy by questioning the gender of the first trans man in India who gave birth to a baby.

He also described the 7 October attacks by Hamas as "resistance" at an IUML rally after Shashi Tharoor called it "terrorist act".
