= P. M. Kunhiraman Nambiar =

Indian politician

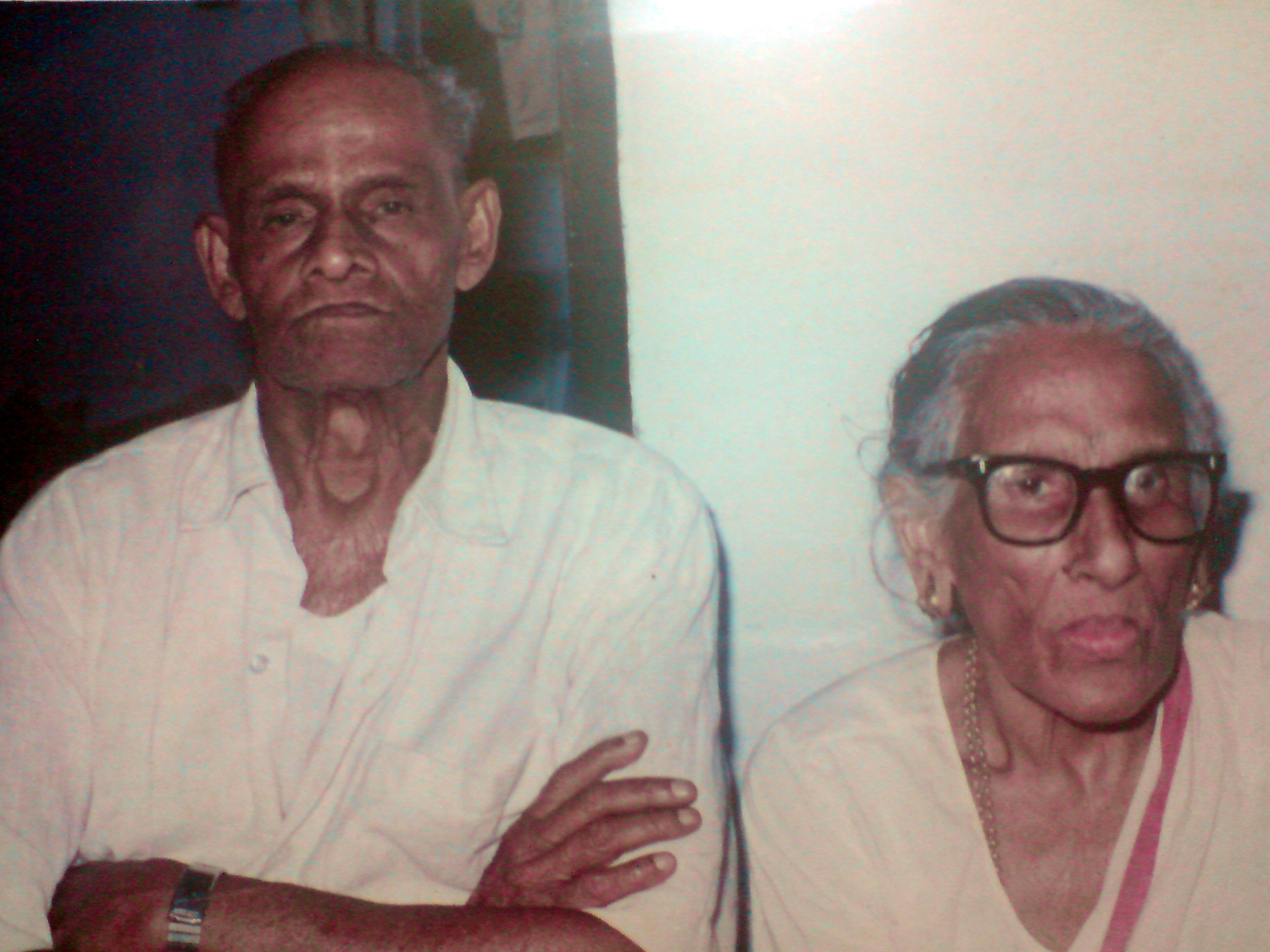
- P. M. Kunhiraman with his wife

Member of the Kerala Legislative Assembly
- Incumbent
- Assumed office 1957
- Constituency: Koilandi

Personal details
- Born: 30 July 1905
- Died: 25 November 1998 (aged 93)

P. M. Kunhiraman Nambiar (30 July 1905 – 25 November 1998) was an Indian politician and freedom fighter. He represented Koilandi in the first and second Kerala Legislative Assembly. He was among the prominent leaders who reorganized the Congress Socialist Party, which went to disarray after a faction of the Congress Socialist Party in Kerala evolved into the Communist Party in 1939.

== Early life and education ==
Nambiar did his education from Azhikode South Elementary School. After passing the 5th standard, he continued his studies in a Sanskrit school called Kacheripara. After two years of Sanskrit studies, he then continued his studies at Rajas High School under the management of King Chirakal. Nambiar became a student at Kannur Municipal High School after completing his 8th standard.

He started showing interest in politics during his college time. In the nationwide agitation against the Simon Commission, Kunjiraman organized several college students to boycott the Simon Commission which led to his suspension from college. After the suspension was lifted, he continued his education. During his second year at college, he suffered a severe injury during gymnastics practice that ended his college education.

== Political career ==
After his college education came to an end, Nambiar started actively participating in Congress activities. He protested against the practices like untouchability. He participated in events like pantibhojan, marching Harijans along public roads, demonstrations, public meetings etc. During that time he suffered a deep injury to the chest by a tamalika to him after he attended the wedding of an Ezhavan.

On 20 December 1924, during a huge Harijan meeting held near Pashiangadi, a foot procession of Harijans from Azhik under the leadership of Nambiar ignored the strong opposition of the conservatives and crossed the Valapatnam River for about ten minutes and reached the meeting place. For Khadi promotion, with the cooperation of his colleagues, he set up charka classes and actively conducted the programs of spinning, weaving, and house-to-house sale of cotton cloth.
