= Kunnamangalam Assembly constituency =

Constituency of the Kerala legislative assembly in India

Kunnamangalam
- Constituency No. 30 for the Kerala Legislative Assembly
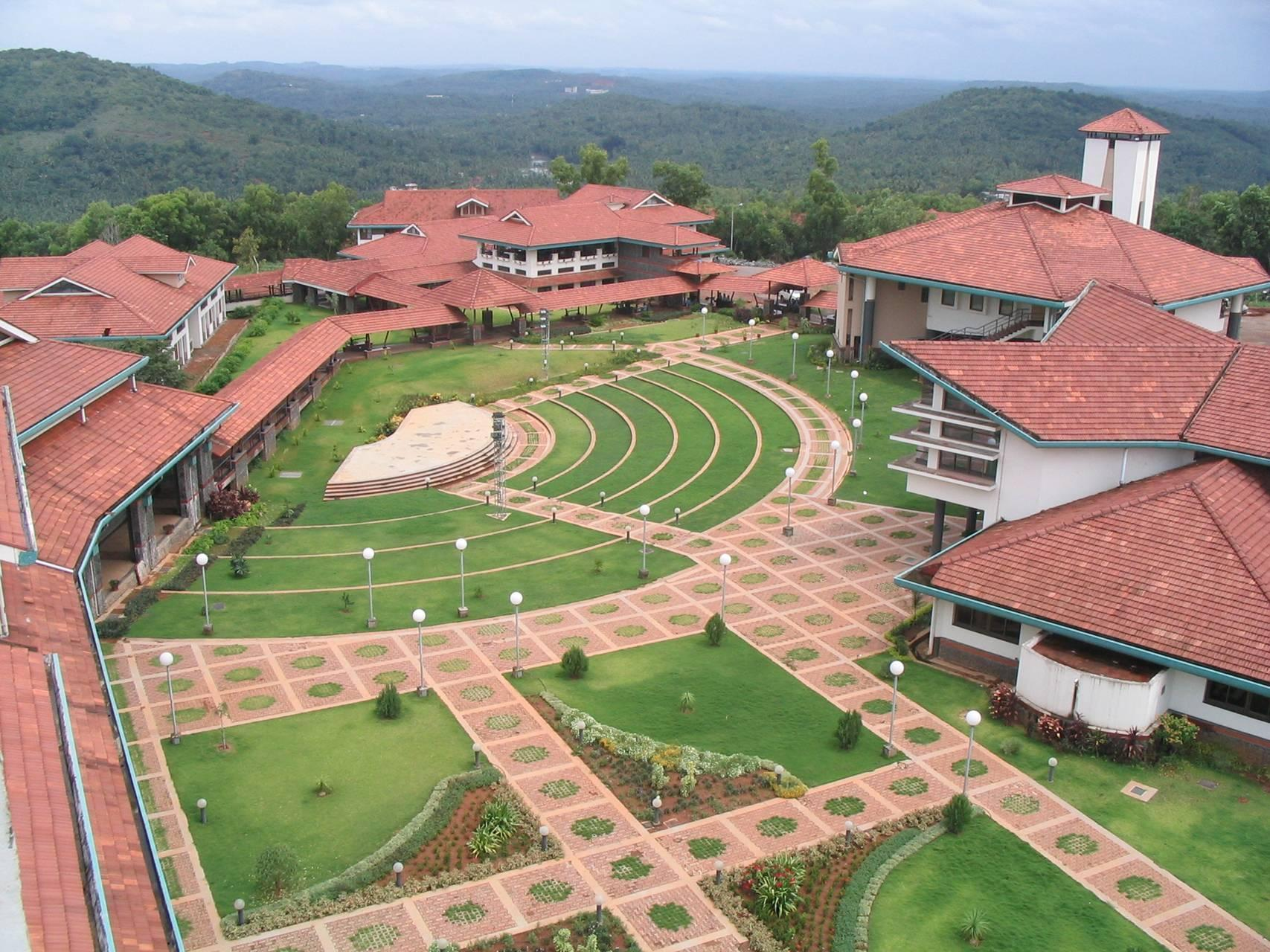
- Indian Institute of Management, Kozhikode (IIMK) located in Kunnamangalam Assembly constituency

Constituency details
- Country: India
- Region: South India
- State: Kerala
- District: Kozhikode
- Established: 1957
- Total electors: 2,31,284 (2021)
- Reservation: None

Member of Legislative Assembly
- 16th Kerala Legislative Assembly
- Incumbent M. A. Razak Master
- Party: IUML
- Alliance: UDF
- Elected year: 2026

Kunnamangalam State assembly constituency is one of the 140 state legislative assembly constituencies in Kerala in southern India. It is also one of the seven state legislative assembly constituencies included in Kozhikode Lok Sabha constituency. As of the 2026 Assembly elections, the current MLA is M. A. Razak Master of IUML.

== Local self-governed segments ==
Kunnamangalam Assembly constituency is composed of the following local self-governed segments:

Sl no.	Name	Status (Grama panchayat/Municipality)	Taluk
1	Chathamangalam	Grama panchayat	Kozhikode
2	Kunnamangalam	Grama panchayat	Kozhikode
3	Mavoor	Grama panchayat	Kozhikode
4	Olavanna	Grama panchayat	Kozhikode
5	Perumanna	Grama panchayat	Kozhikode
6	Peruvayal	Grama panchayat	Kozhikode

== Members of Legislative Assembly ==
The following list contains all members of Kerala Legislative Assembly who have represented the constituency:

Election	Niyama Sabha	Name	Party	Tenure
1957	1st	Leela Damodaran Menon	Indian National Congress	1957 – 1960
1960	2nd	Leela Damodaran Menon	Indian National Congress	1960 – 1965
1967	3rd	V. Kuttikrishnan Nair	Samyukta Socialist Party	1967 – 1970
1970	4th	P. V. S. M. Pookoya Thangal	Indian Union Muslim League	1970 – 1977
1977	5th	K. P. Raman	Muslim League	1977 – 1980
1980	6th	K. P. Raman	Muslim League	1980 – 1982
1982	7th	K. P. Raman	Muslim League	1982 – 1987
1987	8th	C. P. Balan Vaidyar	Communist Party of India	1987 – 1991
1991	9th	C. P. Balan Vaidyar	Communist Party of India	1991 – 1996
1996	10th	C. P. Balan Vaidyar	Communist Party of India	1996 – 2001
2001	11th	U. C. Raman	Indian Union Muslim League	2001 – 2006
2006	12th	U. C. Raman	Indian Union Muslim League	2006 – 2011
2011	13th	P. T. A. Rahim	National Secular Conference	2011 – 2016
2016	14th	P. T. A. Rahim	National Secular Conference	2016 – 2021
2021	15th	P. T. A. Rahim	National Secular Conference	2021-2026
2026	16th	M. A. Razak Master	Indian Union Muslim League	2026-

== Election results ==
Percentage change (±%) denotes the change in the number of votes from the immediate previous election.

=== 2026 ===
2026 Kerala Legislative Assembly election: Kunnamangalam
Party	Candidate	Votes	%	±%
IUML	M. A. Razak Master	91,598		
NSC	P. T. A. Rahim	78,285		
BJP	V. K. Sajeevan	34,435		
Independent	Rahim	2,110		
NOTA	None of the above	1,044		
Independent	Abdu Rasak S/o Muhammed	567		
All India Hindustan Congress Party	Santhosh P. T.	276		
Independent	Abdul Razak S/o Koyakkutty	227		
Independent	Mavoor Muhammed Ali	205		
Independent	Raheem P.	202		
Margin of victory		13,313		
Turnout		2,08,949		
IUML gain from NSC		Swing		

=== 2021 ===
There were 2,31,284 registered voters in the constituency for the 2021 election.

2021 Kerala Legislative Assembly election: Kunnamangalam
Party	Candidate	Votes	%	±%
LDF	P. T. A Rahim	85,138	43.93	▲1.01%
INC	Dinesh Perumanna	74,862	38.62	▲1.91%
BJP	V. K. Sajeevan	27,672	14.28	▼3.85%
SDPI	Abdul Vahid	1,299	0.67	▼0.02
WPOI	E.P Anwar Sadath	1,057	1.56%	
Independent	Dineshan Pakkath	1,021	0.53	−
NOTA	None of the above	864	0.45	▼0.19%
Independent	Abdul Raheem	738	0.38	−
Independent	Babu K.G	724	0.37	−
Independent	Dineshan Mundakkal	225	0.12	−
Independent	Abdul Raheem	222	0.11	−
Margin of victory		10,276	5.30%	▼0.91%
Turnout		1,93,822	83.80	▼2.05%
LDF hold		Swing	▲1.01%	

=== 2016 ===
There were 2,10,071 registered voters in the constituency for the 2016 election.

2016 Kerala Legislative Assembly election: Kunnamangalam
Party	Candidate	Votes	%	±%
LDF	P. T. A. Rahim	77,410	42.92	▼1.16
INC	T. Siddique	66,205	36.71	−
BJP	C. K. Padmanabhan	32,702	18.13	▲6.73
SDPI	Latheef Anora	1,252	0.69	▼0.09
NOTA	None of the above	1,148	0.64	−
Independent	K. P. Raheem Melechettukuzhiyil	726	0.40	−
BSP	P. P. Rajan	304	0.17	▲0.01
Independent	P. Sidheeq Panniyookkil	212	0.12	−
Independent	T. P. Sidheeque Thalappoyil	206	0.11	−
Independent	Aboobacker Sidhique	176	0.10	−
Margin of victory		11,205	6.21	▲4.03
Turnout		1,80,341	85.85	▲1.52
LDF hold		Swing	▼1.16	

=== 2011 ===
There were 1,78,089 registered voters in the constituency for the 2011 election.

2011 Kerala Legislative Assembly election: Kunnamangalam
Party	Candidate	Votes	%	±%
LDF	P. T. A. Rahim	66,169	44.06	
IUML	U. C. Raman	62,900	41.88	
BJP	C. K . Padmanabhan	17,123	11.40	
SDPI	C. Muhammed	1,178	0.78	
Independent	Raman C. K.	701	0.47	−
Independent	K .K. Kunhiraman	427	0.28	−
Independent	E. P. Abdul Raheem	421	0.28	
Independent	Raman P. C.	404	0.27	−
Independent	Abdul Raheem M. T.	325	0.22	−
SS	M. P. Baburaj	303	0.20	−
BSP	O. P. Sundaran	236	0.16	−
Margin of victory		3,269	2.18	
Turnout		1,50,187	84.33	
LDF hold		Swing		

== See also ==
- Kunnamangalam
- Kozhikode district
- List of constituencies of the Kerala Legislative Assembly
- 2016 Kerala Legislative Assembly election
