= M. A. Razak Master =

Indian politician (born 1958)

M. A. Razak

Member of the Kerala Legislative Assembly
- Incumbent
- Assumed office 2026
- Preceded by: P. T. A. Rahim
- Constituency: Kunnamangalam

Personal details
- Born: 1958 (age 67–68)
- Party: Indian Union Muslim League
- Profession: Politician

M. A. Razak (born 1958) is an Indian politician from Kerala. He is a member of the Kerala Legislative Assembly from Kunnamangalam representing the Indian Union Muslim League.

== Early life and education ==
Razak Master is the son of Beeran Kutty Haji. He is a pensioner by profession. He completed his 10th standard in 1974.

== Political career ==
Razak Master won the Kunnamangalam seat in the 2026 Kerala Legislative Assembly election as a candidate of the Indian Union Muslim League supported by the United Democratic Front. He received 91,598 votes and defeated P. T. A. Rahim, an independent candidate supported by the Left Democratic Front, by a margin of 13,313 votes.
