= P. Sankaran =

Indian lawyer and politician (1947–2020)

Member of Parliament, Lok Sabha
- In office 1998–1999
- Preceded by: M. P. Veerendra Kumar
- Succeeded by: K. Muraleedharan
- Constituency: Kozhikode

Member of Legislative Assembly, Kerala
- In office 2001–2006
- Preceded by: P. Vishwan
- Succeeded by: P. Vishwan
- Constituency: Koyilandy

Personal details
- Born: 2 December 1947 Kozhikode, Madras Presidency (present day Kerala, India)
- Died: 25 February 2020 (aged 72)
- Party: Indian National Congress
- Spouse: V. Sudha
- Children: Three
- Education: MA, LL.B

P. Sankaran (2 December 1947 – 25 February 2020) was an Indian lawyer, politician and senior Indian National Congress leader. He was the son of Kelu Nair, a freedom fighter, and Makkam Amma. He died on 25 February 2020.

== Early life ==
He entered politics in his early teens, having actively participated in student agitations since 1959. He was the Vice-Chairman of Calicut University Union during 1973–74 and was the first Student Syndicate Member of Calicut University during 1975–76. He had actively participated in NCC, Scouts, Bharat Sevak Samaj and Seva Dal. He was arrested and jailed during 1977–78 while protesting the arrest of Indira Gandhi.

== Career ==
Sankaran was elected to the 11th Kerala Legislative Assembly from Koyilandy constituency as an Indian National Congress candidate. From 26 May 2001 to 29 August 2004 he handled the Health portfolio in the Kerala State ministry headed by A. K. Antony and Tourism from 11 February 2004 till 31 August 2004, when Antony resigned. In 1998, Sankaran was elected to 12th Lok Sabha. Sankaran served, at different times, as the President of various trade unions. He was President, Kozhikode District Youth Congress Committee (1978), General Secretary (1980–91), DCC, Kozhikode and President DCC (I), Kozhikode.

He was Director and Board Member of Public Undertakings such as Central Manufacturing Technology Institute, Bangalore, Command Area Development Authority (CADA), Thrissur, Oushadhi (Trichur) and Plantation Corporation of Kerala Limited, Kottayam. He worked as General Secretary of Kerala Pradesh Congress Committee (KPCC). Later he worked as Kozhikode district UDF convener.

Lok Sabha
Preceded by M. P. Veerendra Kumar	Member of Parliament for Kozhikode; 1998 – 1999	Succeeded by K. Muraleedharan
