= Kinassery, Palakkad =

Kinassery South-West India
- village
- Location in Kerala, India Kinassery (India)
- Coordinates: 10°43′30″N 76°40′0″E
- Country: India
- State: Kerala
- District: Palakkad

Government
  - Body: Kannadi Panchayat

Languages
  - Official: Malayalam, English
- Time zone: UTC+5:30 (IST)
- PIN: 678701
- Vehicle registration: KL-09
- Nearest city: Palakkad
- Lok Sabha constituency: Ottapalam
- Civic agency: Kannadi Panchayat

Kinassery is a village in Palakkad district of Kerala state, India. It is close by the village of Koduvayur.
