= P. K. Firos =

Indian politician

- Member of Kerala Legislative Assembly
- Assumed office May 2026
- Preceding: M. K. Muneer
- Constituency: Koduvally

State General Secretary of the Muslim Youth League
- Incumbent
- Assumed office 2016

Personal details
- Born: Palulla Kandiyil Firos; 1980 (age 45–46) Kunnamangalam, Kozhikode, Kerala, India
- Party: Indian Union Muslim League
- Education: Government Law College, Kozhikode (LL.B), MG University (LL.M.)
- Occupation: Politician, Legal Consultant

Palulla Kandiyil Firos (born 1980) is an Indian politician from Kerala and a member of the Indian Union Muslim League (IUML). He represents the Koduvally constituency in the Kerala Legislative Assembly. He also serves as the State General Secretary of the Muslim Youth League (MYL), the youth wing of the IUML.

== Political career ==
He started the political life from the ranks of the Muslim Students Federation (India) (MSF) before becoming a prominent leader in the Muslim Youth League. He is known for raising several allegations of nepotism and administrative irregularities against the Left Democratic Front (LDF) government during his tenure as a youth leader.

In the 2021 Kerala Legislative Assembly election, he contested from the Tanur constituency but was defeated by V. Abdurahiman by a narrow margin of 985 votes. In the 2026 assembly elections, he contested from Koduvally and was elected with a significant margin.

== Election results ==
=== 2026 ===
2026 Kerala Legislative Assembly election: Koduvally
Party	Candidate	Votes	%	±%
IUML	P. K. Firos	95,164	57.33	
Left Democratic Front	Saleem Madavoor	58,482	35.20	
BDJS	Giri Pambanal	9,832	5.92	
		Swing		
