= Kozhikode South Assembly constituency =

Constituency of the Kerala legislative assembly in India

Kozhikode South
- Constituency No. 28 for the Kerala Legislative Assembly
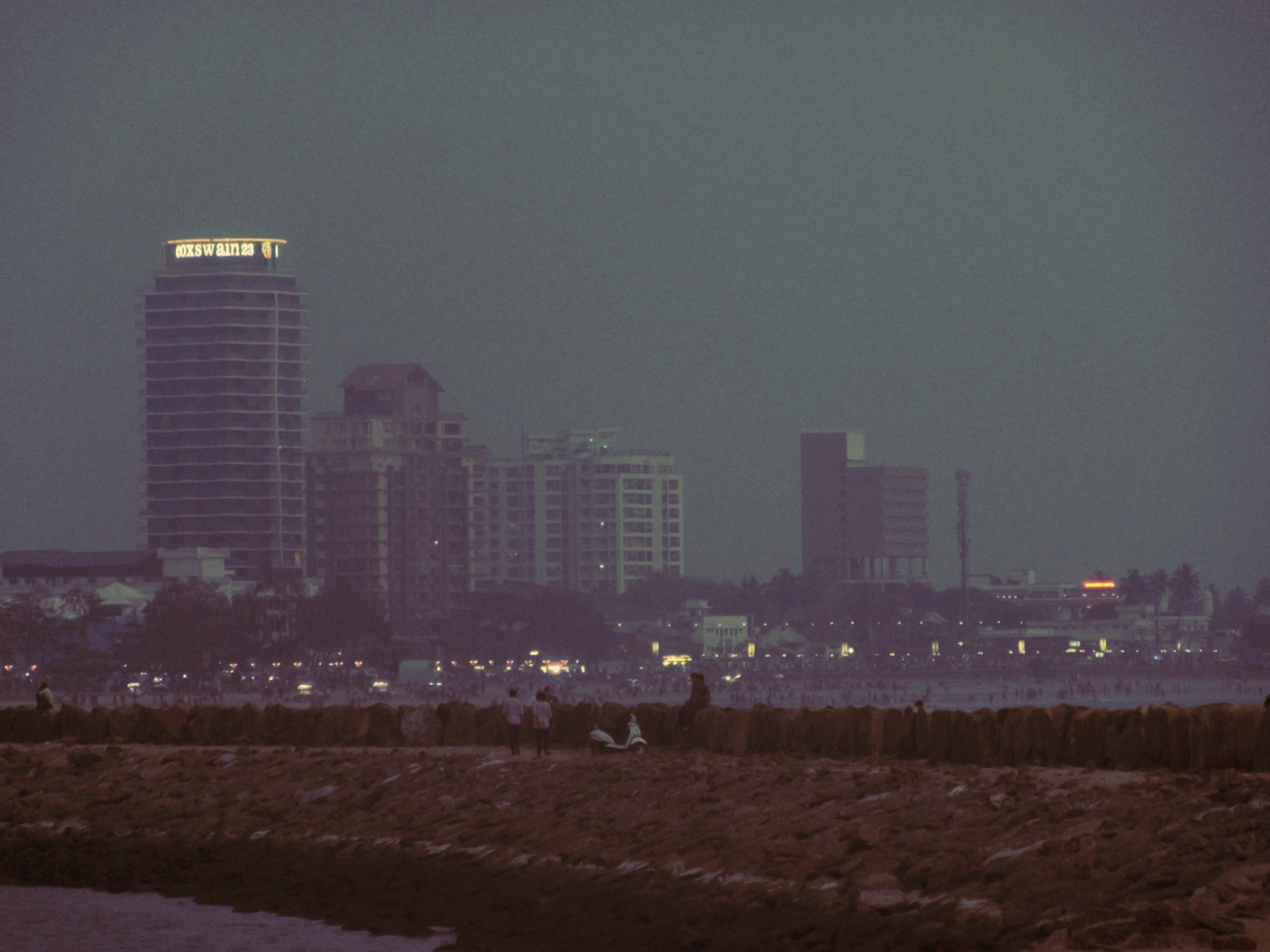
- Kozhikode Beach

Constituency details
- Country: India
- Region: South India
- State: Kerala
- District: Kozhikode
- Established: 2008
- Total electors: 1,55,281 (2026)
- Reservation: None

Member of Legislative Assembly
- 16th Kerala Legislative Assembly
- Incumbent Fyzal Babu
- Party: IUML
- Alliance: UDF
- Elected year: 2026

Kozhikode South State assembly constituency is one of the 140 state legislative assembly constituencies in Kerala in southern India. It is also one of the seven state legislative assembly constituencies included in Kozhikode Lok Sabha constituency. As of the 2026 Assembly elections, the current MLA is Faisal Babu of IUML.

Kozhikode South constituency was established by the 2008 delimitation. Before, it was known as Calicut-II from 1957 to 2008.

== Local self-governed segments ==
Kozhikode South Assembly constituency is composed of the following wards of the Kozhikode Municipal Corporation:

Ward no.	Name	Ward no.	Name
22	Kovoor	23	Nellikode
27	Puthiyara	28	Kuthiravattom
29	Pottammal	30	Kommery
31	Kuttiyilthazham	32	Pokkunnu
33	Kinassery	34	Mankavu
35	Azhchavattom	36	Kallayi
37	Panniyankara	38	Meenchanda
39	Thiruvannur	54	Kappakkal
55	Payyanakkal	56	Chakkumkadavu
57	Mukhador	58	Kuttichira
59	Chalappuram	60	Palayam
61	Valiyangadi	-	-

== Members of the Legislative Assembly ==
=== Calicut-II ===
Election	Niyama Sabha	Member	Party	Tenure
1957	1st	P. Kumaran	Indian National Congress	1957 – 1960
1960	2nd	P. Kumaran	Indian National Congress	1960 – 1965
1967	3rd	P. M. Aboobacker	Indian Union Muslim League	1967 – 1970
1970	4th	Kalpally Madhava Menon	Indian National Congress	1970 – 1977
1977	5th	P. M. Aboobacker	Muslim League	1977 – 1980
1980	6th	P. M. Aboobacker	Muslim League	1980 – 1982
1982	7th	P. M. Aboobacker	Muslim League	1982 – 1987
1987	8th	C. P. Kunhu	Communist Party of India	1987 – 1991
1991	9th	M. K. Muneer	Indian Union Muslim League	1991 – 1996
1996	10th	Elamaram Kareem	Communist Party of India	1996 – 2001
2001	11th	T. P. M. Zahir	Indian Union Muslim League	2001 – 2006
2006	12th	P. M. A. Salam	Indian National League	2006 – 2011

=== Kozhikode South ===
Election	Niyama Sabha	Member	Party	Tenure
2011	13th	M. K. Muneer	Indian Union Muslim League	2011 – 2016
2016	14th	M. K. Muneer	Indian Union Muslim League	2016-2021
2021	15th	Ahamed Devarkovil	Indian National League	2021-2026
2026	16th	Faisal Babu	Indian Union Muslim League	2026-2031

== Election results ==
Percentage change (±) denotes the change in the number of votes from the immediate previous election.

=== 2026 ===
2026 Kerala Legislative Assembly election: Kozhikode South
Party	Candidate	Votes	%	±%
IUML	Fyzal Babu	52,680	41.20	▲7.52
INL	Ahamed Devarkovil	41,885	32.76	▼11.99
BJP	T. Raneesh	32,465	25.79	▲4.90
NOTA	None of the above	838	0.66	▲0.15
Margin of victory		10,795	8.44	▼2.02
Turnout		1,27,866	81.92	▲6.23
IUML gain from INL		Swing	-	

=== 2021 ===
There were 1,57,275 registered voters in the constituency for the 2021 election.

2021 Kerala Legislative Assembly election: Kozhikode South
Party	Candidate	Votes	%	±%
INL	Ahamed Devarkovil	52,557	44.15	▲6.49
IUML	Noorbeena Rasheed	40,098	33.68	▼9.45
BJP	Navya Haridas	24,873	20.89	▲4.33
NOTA	None of the above	603	0.51	▼0.17
Independent	Mubeena	513	0.43	
Independent	P Hareendranath	410	0.34	−
Margin of victory		12,459	10.46	
Turnout		1,19,054	75.69	
INL gain from IUML		Swing		

=== 2016 ===
There were 1,49,054 registered voters in Kozhikode South Assembly constituency for the 2016 Kerala Assembly election.

2016 Kerala Legislative Assembly election: Kozhikode South
Party	Candidate	Votes	%	±%
IUML	M. K. Muneer	49,863	43.13	▼2.95
INL	A. P. Abdul Vahab	43,536	37.66	▼7.09
BDJS	Satheesh Kuttiyil	19,146	16.56	▲9.31
NOTA	None of the above	788	0.68	−
SDPI	U. K. Deysi Balasubrahmanyan	593	0.51	▼0.21
BSP	Kamala Pavithran	480	0.42	▲0.11
Independent	A. P. Abdul Vahab	287	0.25	−
Independent	A. K. Sajan	227	0.20	−
Independent	Abdul Sathar	211	0.18	−
Independent	Muneer Davari	190	0.16	−
Independent	Premanand T.	166	0.14	−
Independent	Abdul Muneer	130	0.11	−
Margin of victory		6,327	5.47	▲3.44
Turnout		1,15,617	77.57	▲0.51
IUML hold		Swing	▼2.95	

=== 2011 ===
There were 1,32,780 registered voters in the constituency for the 2011 election.

2011 Kerala Legislative Assembly election: Kozhikode South
Party	Candidate	Votes	%	±%
IUML	M. K. Muneer	47,771	46.08	−
CPI(M)	C. P. Musaffer Ahammed	46,395	44.75	−
BJP	Jaya Sadanandan	7,512	7.25	−
SDPI	Faiz Mohammed	749	0.72	
Independent	T. T. Muneer	488	0.47	−
Independent	Mussafar Ahammed	433	0.42	
BSP	Muhammed Asharaf	323	0.31	
Margin of victory		1,376	2.03	
Turnout		1,03,671	78.08	
IUML win (new seat)				

== See also ==
- Kozhikode South
- Kozhikode district
- List of constituencies of the Kerala Legislative Assembly
- 2016 Kerala Legislative Assembly election
