= Kinassery, Kozhikode =

Kinassery Nacheripadam
- Suburb
- Location in Kerala, India
- Coordinates: 11°14′0″N 75°49′0″E
- Country: India
- State: Kerala
- District: Kozhikode

Languages
  - Official: Malayalam, English
- Time zone: UTC+5:30 (IST)
- Telephone code: 0495233
- Vehicle registration: KL-
- Nearest city: Kozhikode (5 km)
- Lok Sabha constituency: Kozhikode
- Climate: Tropical Wet (Köppen)

Kinassery is a suburb of Kozhikode city in the state of Kerala, India. It is located on the eastern side of the city and forms Ward 33 of the Kozhikode Municipal Corporation.

== Transportation ==
Kinassery is connected to Kozhikode city by road. Bus services to Kulangara Peedika, Perumanna, Pokkunnu and Pantheeramkavu pass through Kinassery. The nearest railway station is Kozhikode railway station, about 5 km away.
