= Quilandy Assembly constituency =

Constituency of the Kerala legislative assembly in India

Quilandy
- Constituency No. 23 for the Kerala Legislative Assembly
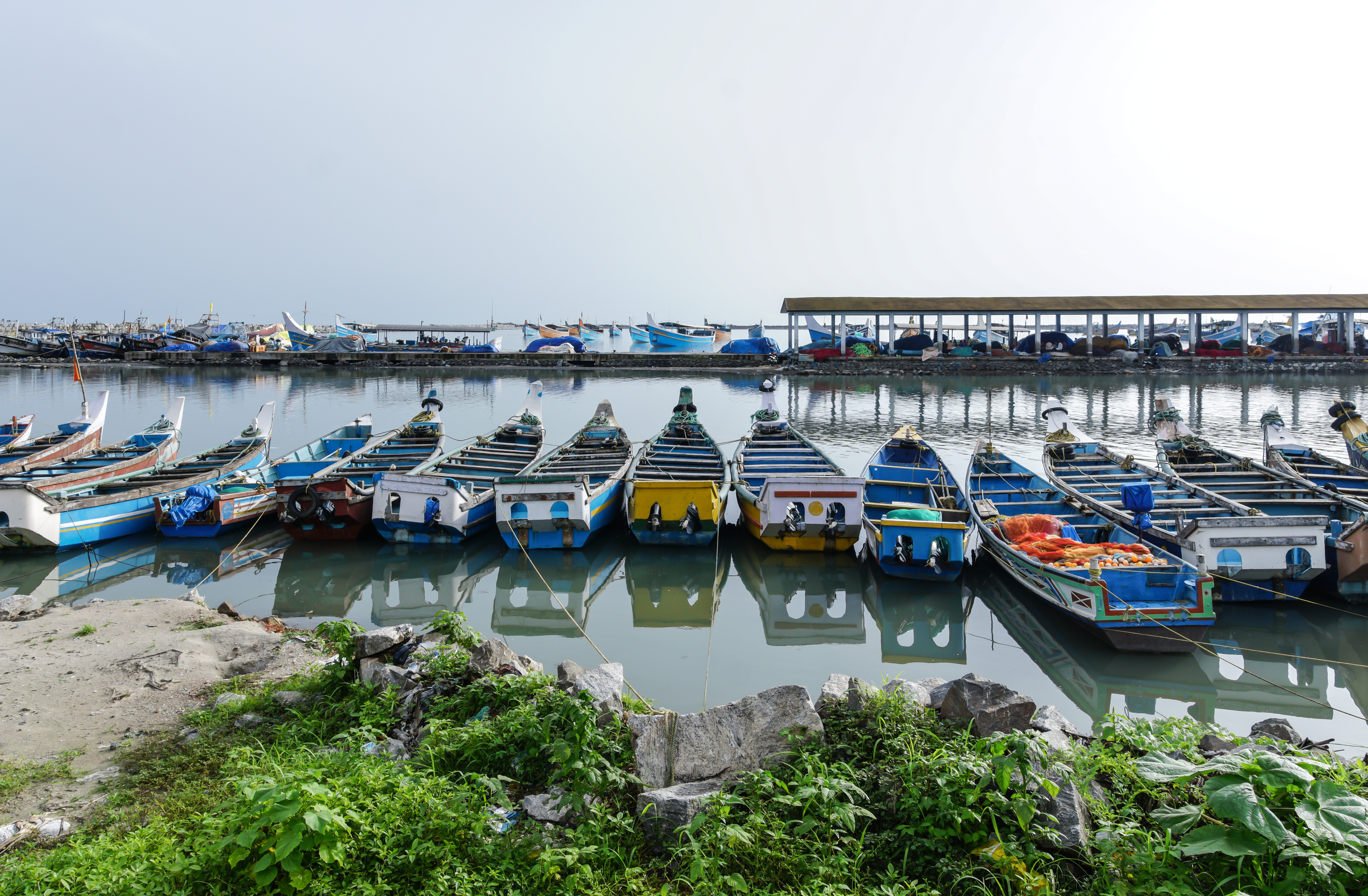
- Koyilandy Fishing Harbour

Constituency details
- Country: India
- Region: South India
- State: Kerala
- District: Kozhikode
- Established: 1951
- Total electors: 2,05,993 (2021)
- Reservation: None

Member of Legislative Assembly
- 16th Kerala Legislative Assembly
- Incumbent K. Praveen Kumar
- Party: Indian National Congress
- Elected year: 2026

Quilandy State Assembly constituency is one of the 140 state legislative assembly constituencies in the southern Indian state of Kerala. It is also one of the seven state legislative assembly constituencies included in Vatakara Lok Sabha constituency. As of the 2026 Assembly elections, the current MLA is K. Praveen Kumar of Indian National Congress.

== Local self-governed segments ==
Quilandy Assembly constituency is composed of the following local self-governed segments:

Sl no.	Name	Status (Grama panchayat/Municipality)	Taluk
1	Koyilandy	Municipality	Koyilandy
2	Payyoli	Municipality	Koyilandy
3	Chemancheri	Grama panchayat	Koyilandy
4	Chengottukavu	Grama Panchayat	Koyilandy
5	Moodadi	Grama panchayat	Koyilandy
6	Thikkodi	Grama panchayat	Koyilandy

== Members of the Legislative Assembly ==
The following list contains all members of Kerala Legislative Assembly who have represented the constituency:

Election	Niyama Sabha	Name	Party	Tenure
1957	1st	Kunhiraman Nambiar	Praja Socialist Party	1957 – 1960
1960	2nd	Kunhiraman Nambiar	Praja Socialist Party	1960 – 1965
1967	3rd	P. K. Kidave	Samyukta Socialist Party	1967 – 1970
1970	4th	E. Narayanan Nambiar	Indian National Congress	1970 – 1977
1977	5th	E. Narayanan Nambiar	Indian National Congress	1977 – 1980
1980	6th	Manimangalath Kuttialy	Indian National Congress	1980 – 1982
1982	7th	Manimangalath Kuttialy	Indian National Congress	1982 – 1987
1987	8th	M. T. Padma	Indian National Congress	1987 – 1991
1991	9th	M. T. Padma	Indian National Congress	1991 – 1996
1996	10th	P. Vishwan	Communist Party of India	1996 – 2001
2001	11th	P. Sankaran	Indian National Congress	2001 – 2006
2006	12th	P. Vishwan	Communist Party of India	2006 – 2011
2011	13th	K. Dasan	Communist Party of India	2011 – 2016
2016	14th	K. Dasan	Communist Party of India	2016-2021
2021	15th	Kanathil Jameela	Communist Party of India	2021-2025
2026	16th	K. Praveen Kumar	Indian National Congress	2026-

== Election results ==
=== 2025 ===
	LDF	NDA	UDF	SDPI	AAP	IND	WPI		LEADING ALLIANCE
QUILANDY	20134	7449	20283	187	0	57	102	48212	UDF
PAYYOLI	14199	4156	15271	31	139	43	0	33839	UDF
CHEMANCHERY	9891	3287	11589	0	0	0	0	24767	UDF
CHENGOTTUKAVU	6279	5054	7856	26	0	99	0	19314	UDF
MOODADI	10006	1021	10650	27	0	60	0	21764	UDF
THIKKODI	6417	1456	9313	0	0	36	196	17418	UDF
TOTAL	66926	22423	74962	271	139	295	298	165314	
%	40.48416952	13.56388449	45.34522182	0.1639304596	0.08408241286	0.1784482863	0.1802630146		

=== 2026 ===
2026 Kerala Legislative Assembly election: Quilandy
Party	Candidate	Votes	%	±%
INC	K. Praveen Kumar	79,917	46.35	▲4.92
CPI(M)	K. Dasan	67,843	39.35	▼7.31
BJP	C. R. Praphul Krishnan	23,543	13.66	▲2.83
NOTA	None of the above	442	0.26	▼0.04
Margin of victory		12,070	7.00	
Turnout		1,72,427		
INC gain from CPI(M)		Swing		

=== 2021 ===
There were 2,05,993 registered voters in the constituency for the 2021 election.

2021 Kerala Legislative Assembly election: Quilandy
Party	Candidate	Votes	%	±%
CPI(M)	Kanathil Jameela	75,628	46.66	▲0.72
INC	N. Subramanian	67,156	41.43	▲4.19
BJP	N. P. Radhakrishnan	17,555	10.83	▼3.54
SUCI(C)	Praveen Cheruvath	221	0.14	−
Independent	Jameela. P.P.	651	0.40	−
Independent	Subrahmanyan Kanaran	381	0.24	−
NOTA	None of the above	492	0.30	−
Margin of victory		8472	5.23	▼3.47
Turnout		1,62,084	78.68	▼2.85
CPI(M) hold		Swing	▲0.72	

=== 2016 ===
There were 1,88,490 registered voters in the constituency for the 2016 election.

2016 Kerala Legislative Assembly election: Quilandy
Party	Candidate	Votes	%	±%
CPI(M)	K. Dasan	70,593	45.94	▼1.26
INC	N. Subramanian	57,224	37.24	▼6.92
BJP	K. Rajinesh Babu	22,087	14.37	▲8.44
SDPI	Ismayil Kammana	798	0.52	−
PDP	Rasal M. K.	703	0.46	−
BSP	Parappil Balakrishnan	678	0.44	▲0.10
NOTA	None of the above	653	0.42	−
Independent	M. N. Subramanian Kakkudumbil Meethal	489	0.32	−
Independent	P. K. Dasan Pazhunthum Koottathil	167	0.11	−
SUCI(C)	P. M. Sreekumar	149	0.10	−
CPI(M)	P. M. Kunhiraman	126	0.08	−
Margin of victory		13,369	8.70	▲5.66
Turnout		1,53,667	81.53	▼0.32
CPI(M) hold		Swing	▼1.26	

=== 2011 ===
There were 1,66,632 registered voters in the constituency for the 2011 election.

2011 Kerala Legislative Assembly election: Quilandy
Party	Candidate	Votes	%	±%
CPI(M)	K. Dasan	64,374	47.20	
INC	K.P. Anil Kumar	60,235	44.16	
BJP	T. P. Jayachandran	8,086	5.93	
Independent	C. Muneer	985	0.72	
SDPI	Rashid P. T.	985	0.72	
Independent	K. P. Anil Kumar	520	0.38	
BSP	K. V. Krishnan Koduvayal	466	0.34	
Independent	Dasan M. K.	418	0.31	
Independent	Dasan V. K.	325	0.24	
Margin of victory		4,139	3.04	
Turnout		1,36,394	81.85	
CPI(M) hold		Swing		

=== 1952 ===
1952 Madras Legislative Assembly election: Quilandy
Party	Candidate	Votes	%	±%
KMPP	Kunhriramakurup Chemmaratha	22,699	46.64%	
INC	Vasudevan Nair, Anantapuram Patinhare Madam	15,107	31.04%	31.04%
Independent	Padamanabhan Poozhikunath	10,863	22.32%	
Margin of victory		7,592	15.60%	
Turnout		48,669	70.44%	
Registered electors		69,088		
KMPP win (new seat)				

== See also ==
- Koyilandy
- Kozhikode district
- List of constituencies of the Kerala Legislative Assembly
- 2016 Kerala Legislative Assembly election
