= National Secular Conference =

National Secular Conference (NSC) നാഷണൽ സെക്യുലർ കോൺഫറൻസ്
- Abbreviation: NSC
- Leader: P. T. A. Rahim
- Founder: P. T. A. Rahim
- Founded: 2011
- Headquarters: MISFA, Koduvally (P.O.), Kozhikode DT., Kerala
- Student wing: Secular Students Union
- Youth wing: Secular Youth Conference
- Ideology: Scheduled Castes interests Secularism
- National affiliation: LDF (external support)
- Kerala Legislative Assembly: 0 / 140

Election symbol
- Glass Tumbler

Party flag
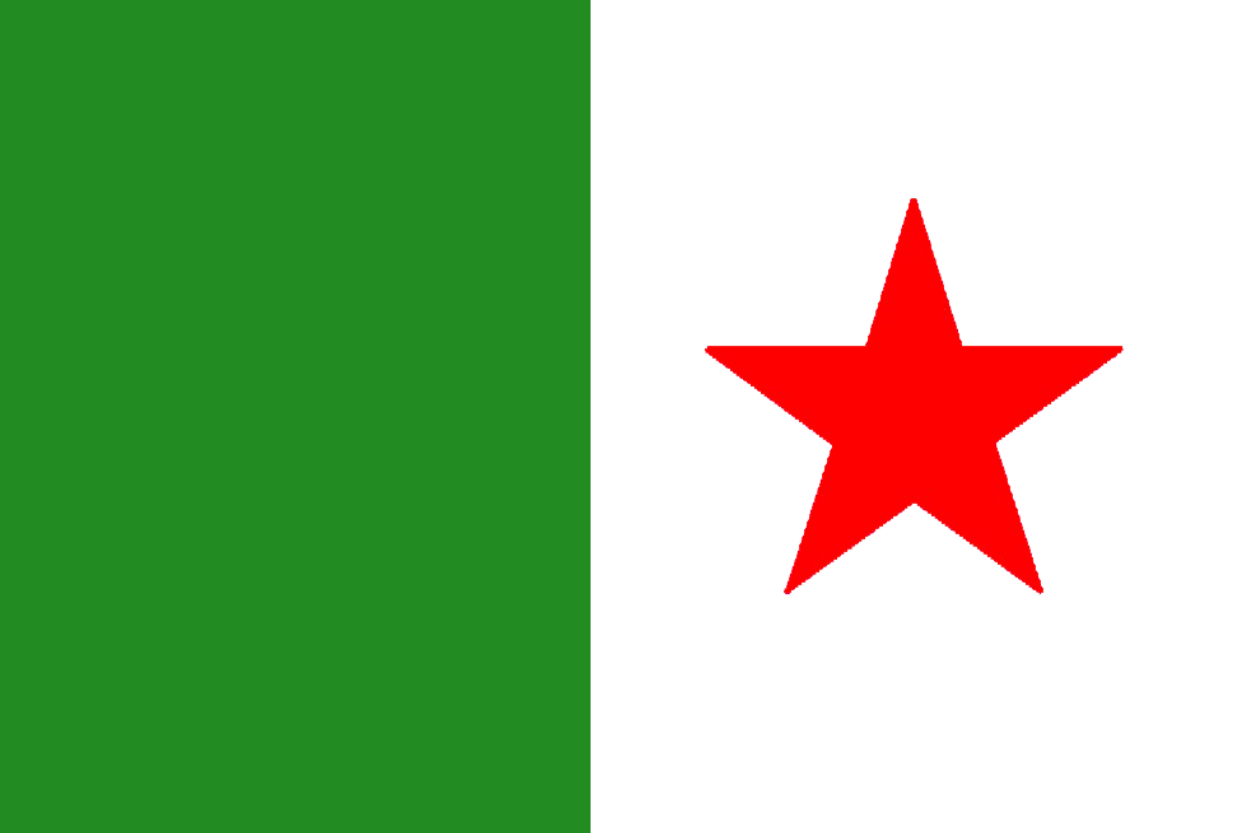

National Secular Conference (NSC) is an Indian political party from Kerala. P. T. A. Rahim is the state president of National Secular Conference (NSC). In early 2011 with the support of LDF, under the leadership of P. T. A. Rahim a new party, National Secular Conference (NSC) was formed to protect the rights of Dalits, religious minorities and other backward sections of people. Without long historical background, NSC flourished in different parts of Kerala by utilising its secular mottos. Jaleel Punalur is the state organising secretary of NSC. The party have roots in southern region of the state, with many members in Alappuzha, Kollam, and Trivandrum districts.

== Electoral performance ==
Kerala Legislative Assembly election results
Election Year	Alliance	Seats contested	Seats won	Total Votes	Percentage of votes	+/- Vote
2021	LDF	1	1 / 140	70,704	0.34%	▼0.31%
2016	LDF	2	1 / 140	130,843	0.65%	▲0.27%
2011	LDF	1	1 / 140	66,169	0.38%	New
