= Koduvally Assembly constituency =

Constituency of the Kerala legislative assembly in India

Koduvally
- Constituency No. 31 for the Kerala Legislative Assembly
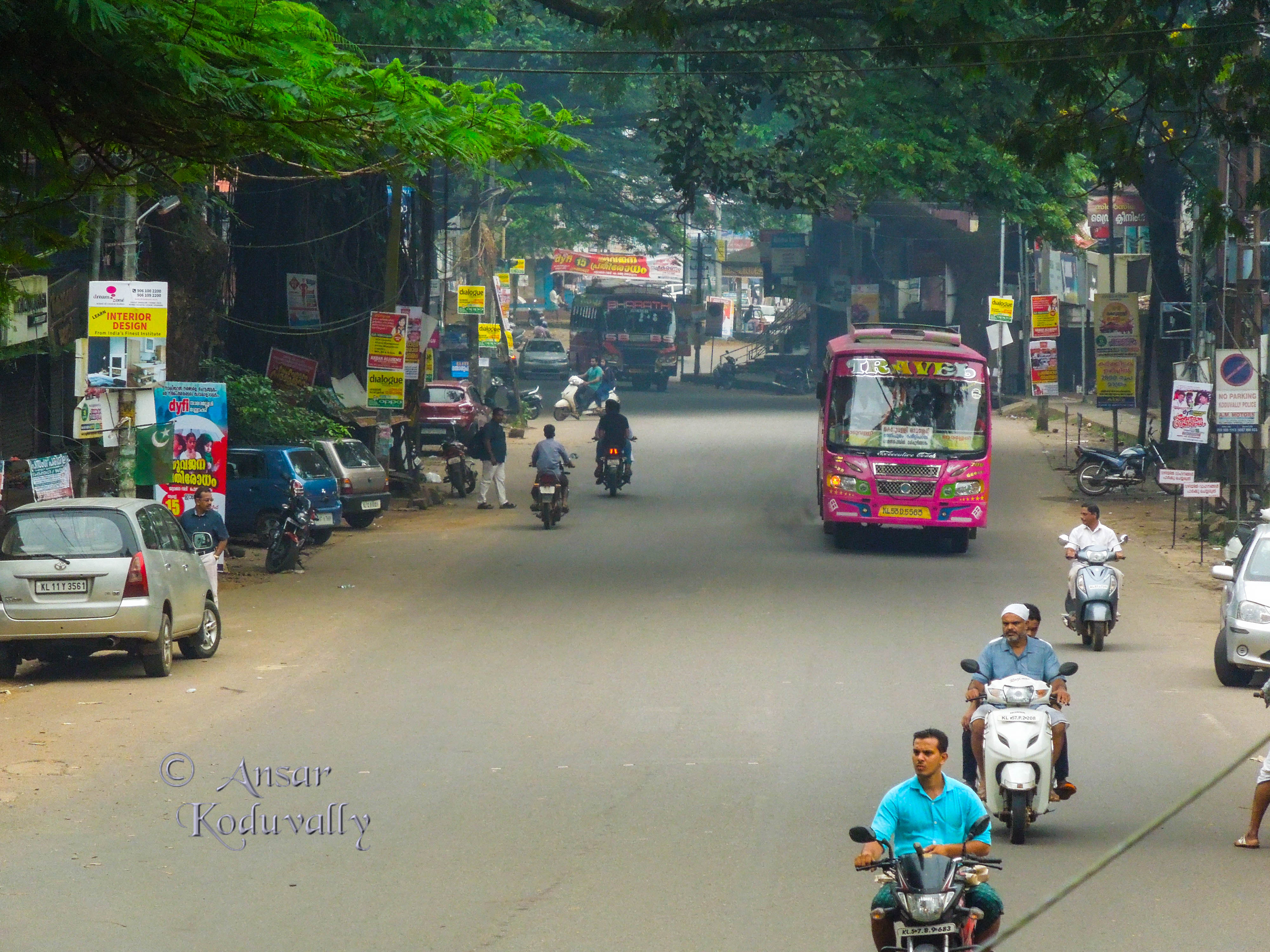
- Koduvally Main Road in Koduvally Assembly constituency

Constituency details
- Country: India
- Region: South India
- State: Kerala
- District: Kozhikode
- Established: 1957 (first establishment); 1977 (second establishment)
- Total electors: 1,83,387 (2021)
- Reservation: None

Member of Legislative Assembly
- 16th Kerala Legislative Assembly
- Incumbent P. K. Firos
- Party: IUML
- Alliance: UDF
- Elected year: 2026

Koduvally State assembly constituency is one of the 140 state legislative assembly constituencies in Kerala in southern India. It is also one of the seven state legislative assembly constituencies included in Kozhikode Lok Sabha constituency. As of the 2026 assembly elections, the current MLA is P. K. Firos Of IUML.

== Local self-governed segments ==
Koduvally Assembly constituency is composed of the following local self-governed segments:

Sl no.	Name	Status (Grama panchayat/Municipality)	Taluk
1	Koduvally	Municipality	Thamarassery
2	Kattippara	Grama panchayat	Thamarassery
3	Kizhakkoth	Grama panchayat	Thamarassery
4	Narikkuni	Grama panchayat	Thamarassery
5	Omassery	Grama panchayat	Thamarassery
6	Thamarassery	Grama panchayat	Thamarassery
7	Madavoor	Grama panchayat	Kozhikode

== Members of Legislative Assembly ==
The following list contains all members of Kerala Legislative Assembly who have represented Koduvally Assembly constituency during the period of various assemblies:

Election	Niyama Sabha	Name	Party	Tenure
1957	1st	M. Gopalankutty Nair	Indian National Congress	1957 – 1960
1960	2nd	M. Gopalankutty Nair	Indian National Congress	1960 – 1964
1977	5th	E. Ahamed	Indian Union Muslim League	1977 – 1980
1980	6th	P. V. Mohammed	Indian Union Muslim League	1980 – 1982
1982	7th	P. V. Mohammed	Indian Union Muslim League	1982 – 1987
1987	8th	P. M. Aboobacker	Indian Union Muslim League	1987 – 1991
1991	9th	P. V. Mohammed	Indian Union Muslim League	1991 – 1996
1996	10th	C. Moyinkutty	Indian Union Muslim League	1996 – 2001
2001	11th	C. Mammutty	Indian Union Muslim League	2001 – 2006
2006	12th	P. T. A. Rahim	Left Democratic Front	2006 – 2011
2011	13th	V. M. Ummer Master	Indian Union Muslim League	2011 – 2016
2016	14th	Karat Razak	Left Democratic Front	2016-2021
2021	15th	M. K. Muneer	Indian Union Muslim League	2021-2026
2026	16th	P. K. Firos	Indian Union Muslim League	2026-

== Election results ==
Percentage change (±%) denotes the change in the number of votes from the immediate previous election.

=== 2026 ===
2026 Kerala Legislative Assembly election: Koduvally
Party	Candidate	Votes	%	±%
IUML	P. K. Firos	95,164	57.33	▲9.47
LDF	Saleem Madavoor	58,482	35.20	▼8.46
BDJS	Giri Pambanal	9,832	5.92	▼0.35
NOTA	None of the above	490		
RPI(A)	Sunil Mannath	397		
Independent	Firose K. C.	298		
AAP	Bavan Kutty K. M.	286		
Independent	Abdul Shukkoor	212		
Independent	Firose	185		
Independent	Lakshmanan K. P. Thamarassery	184		
Independent	Saleem Muttanchery	142		
Independent	Saleem C. K.	121		
Independent	Sajir K.	107		
Independent	Shaheeda C. P.	88		
Margin of victory		36,682		
Turnout		1,65,988		
IUML hold		Swing		

=== 2021 ===
There were 1,83,388 registered voters in the constituency for the 2021 election.

2021 Kerala Legislative Assembly election: Koduvally
Party	Candidate	Votes	%	±%
IUML	M. K. Muneer	72,336	47.86	▲3.85
Independent	Karat Razak	65,992	43.66	▼0.76
BJP	T Balasoman	9,498	6.27	▼2.12
SDPI	Musthafa Kommeri	1,769	1.17	▲0.1
NOTA	None of the above	269	0.18	▼0.24
Independent	Abdul Razak K. T.	381	0.25	
Independent	Abdul Razack	325	0.22	−
Independent	Muneer M.K	228	0.15	−
Margin of victory		6,344	4.19	
Turnout		1,51,154	82.42	▲0.54
IUML gain from Independent		Swing		

=== 2016 ===
There were 1,67,786 registered voters in the constituency for the 2016 election.

2016 Kerala Legislative Assembly election: Koduvally
Party	Candidate	Votes	%	±%
Independent	Karat Razak	61,033	44.42	−
IUML	M. A. Razak	60,460	44.01	▼9.02
BJP	Ali Akbar	11,537	8.40	▲2.67
WPOI	P. K. Zakariya	1,566	1.14	
SDPI	E. Nazar	1,466	1.07	▼0.41
NOTA	None of the above	582	0.42	−
Independent	Abdul Razak K. T.	352	0.26	
Independent	Sayyid Hussain Jiffri Thangal	281	0.20	−
Independent	K. P .Aboobacker	112	0.08	−
Margin of victory		573	0.41	
Turnout		1,37,389	81.88	▲2.34
Independent gain from IUML		Swing		

=== 2011 ===
There were 1,42,384 registered voters in the constituency for the 2011 election.

2011 Kerala Legislative Assembly election: Koduvally
Party	Candidate	Votes	%	±%
IUML	V. M. Ummer	60,365	53.03	
CPI(M)	M. Mehaboob	43,813	38.49	▼1.16
BJP	Gireesh Thevally	6,519	5.73	
SDPI	M. T. Abdul Haji	1,688	1.48	
BSP	Aboobacker	496	0.44	
Independent	Mehaboob Kanichadikkuzhi Valeparammel	324	0.28	−
Independent	Ummer	313	0.27	▲0.01
Independent	Mehaboob Illikkathodi	306	0.27	−
Margin of victory		16,552	14.54	
Turnout		1,13,824	79.94	▲1.52
IUML gain from Independent		Swing		

== See also ==
- Koduvally
- Kozhikode district
- List of constituencies of the Kerala Legislative Assembly
- 2016 Kerala Legislative Assembly election
