= Satheeshan Pacheni =

Indian politician (1968–2022)

- Born: 5 January 1968; Pacheni, Taliparamba, Kerala, India
- Died: 27 October 2022 (aged 54); Kannur, Kerala, India
- Known for: Politician
- Political party: Indian National Congress

Satheeshan Pacheni (5 January 1968 – 27 October 2022) was an Indian politician from Kerala, and a leader of Indian National Congress. He started his political career with KSU and went on to become its general secretary and State president. He contested Kerala assembly elections in 1996 from Taliparamba, 2001 and 2006 from Malampuzha against V.S. Achuthanandan and in 2016 and 2021 from Kannur, but lost in all of them. He has also contested the Lok Sabha elections in 2009 from Palakkad constituency but lost by a small margin. He has also been the general secretary of KPCC. He suffered cerebral hemorrhage on 19 October and died at a private hospital in Kannur on 27 October 2022, at the age of 54.
