= Ahamed Devarkovil =

Indian politician

- അഹമ്മദ് ദേവർകോവിൽ

Member of the Kerala Legislative Assembly
- In office 20 May 2021 – 23 May 2026
- Preceded by: M. K. Muneer
- Succeeded by: Fyzal Babu
- Constituency: Kozhikode South

Minister for Ports, Museum, Archeology & Archives Government of Kerala
- In office 20 May 2021 – 24 December 2023
- Chief minister: Pinarayi Vijayan
- Preceded by: Kadannappalli Ramachandran
- Succeeded by: Kadannappalli Ramachandran
- Constituency: Kozhikode South

Personal details
- Born: May 20, 1959 (age 67) Kozhikode, India
- Party: Indian National League
- Other political affiliations: Left Democratic Front
- Children: 3

Ahamed Devarkovil is an Indian politician from Indian National League. He was in office as Minister of Ports, Museums, Archaeology and Archives for the first two and half years of the Second Pinarayi Vijayan ministry.

== Life ==
In 1977, he completed his tenth standard at Kuttyadi High School. He was the school leader as well. He was arrested for writing an essay in a school magazine against the internal emergency. It was only in 1980, he could finish his tenth standard education, but from Govt. High School, Kalliyadu.

== Political career ==
Ahammad Devarkovil started his political life in the Muslim Students Federation during his school days. He was once the district secretary of MSF in Kozhikode district. He was active in Indian Union Muslim League as well. Later, he joined Indian National League.

In 2021 Kerala Assembly Election, Ahammad Devarkovil defeated IUML's Adv. Noorbeena Rasheed by a margin of 12,459 votes at Kozhikode South assembly constituency.

Constituency: Kozhikode South
| O.S.N. | Candidate | Party | Total votes | % of votes |
|---|---|---|---|---|
| 1 | Ahammad Devarkovil | Indian National League | 52,557 | 44.15 |
| 2 | Adv. Noorbeena Rasheed | Indian Union Muslim League | 40,098 | 33.68 |
| 3 | Navya Haridas | Bharatiya Janata Party | 24,873 | 20.89 |
| 4 | P. Hareendranath | Democratic Social Justice Party | 410 | 0.34 |
| 5 | Adv. Mubeena | Independent | 513 | 0.43 |
| 6 | NOTA | | 603 | 0.51 |
| | Total | | 1,19,054 | |
