= Kanathil Jameela =

Indian politician (1966–2025)

MLA Kanathil Jameela
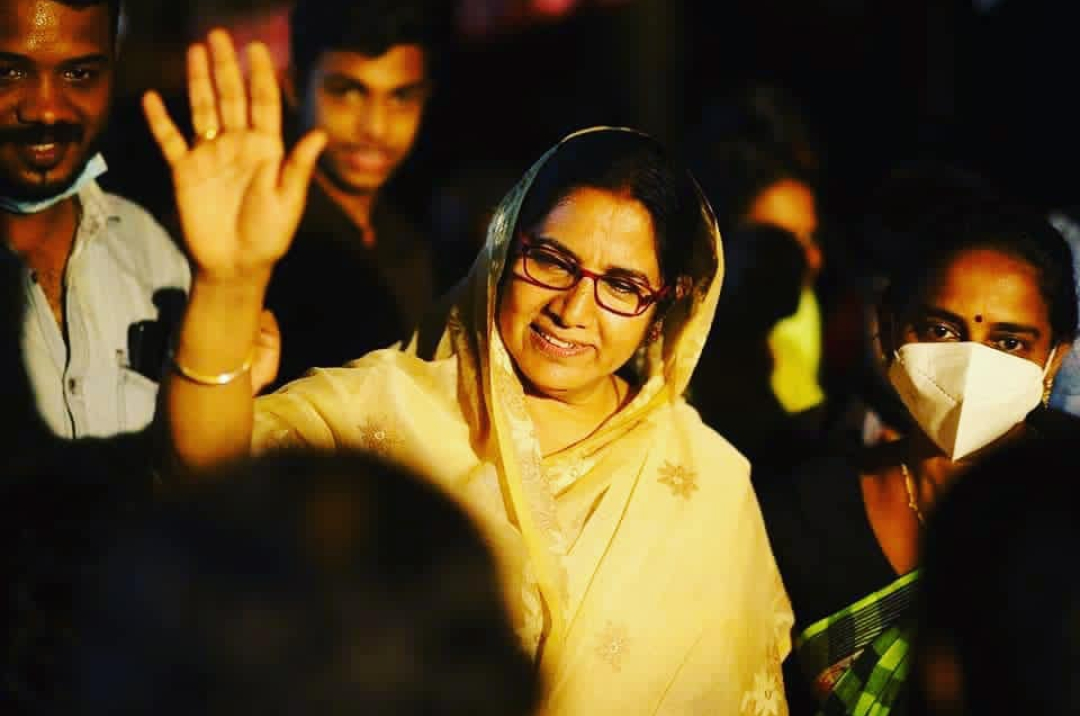
- Kanathil Jameela MLA at a Public Meeting

Member of the Kerala Legislative Assembly for Koyilandi
- In office May 2021 – 29 November 2025
- Preceded by: K. Dasan

Personal details
- Born: 5 May 1966 Kuttiyadi, Kozhikode district, Kerala, India
- Died: 29 November 2025 (aged 59) Kozhikode, Kerala, India
- Party: Communist Party of India (Marxist)
- Spouse: Abdurahiman Kanathil
- Children: Ayreej, Anooja
- Parent(s): T. K. Ali, T. K. Mariyam
- Occupation: Social worker, Politician, Philanthropist

Kanathil Jameela (5 May 1966 – 29 November 2025) was an Indian politician and the elected member of Kerala Legislative Assembly representing Koyilandi Constituency as the member of Communist Party of India (Marxist) from May 2021 until her death in November 2025. Jameela was also the President of District Panchayath Kozhikode.

== Background ==
Kanathil Jameela was born on 5 May 1966 in the village of Kuttiady, Kozhikode district, Kerala, to T. K. Ali and T. K. Mariam. She grew up in a socially active family and was introduced early to community life and public service. During her education in Kerala, she deepened this early interest in social work and local issues affecting women and children, and later became active in literacy and community development initiatives before entering politics.

Jameela was married to Abdul Rahman. They had two children: a son, Ayreej, and a daughter, Anooja. Kanathil Jameela died on 29 November 2025, while undergoing treatment at Meitra Hospital in Kozhikode. She was 59, and had been battling cancer for six months.

== Political career ==
Kanathil Jameela’s first political experience came as a student when she contested, unsuccessfully, a school representative post against a Kerala Students Union (KSU) candidate while in the ninth standard at Government High School, Kuttiady.

She began her public service career as a literacy mission worker in 1992.

In 1995, she entered local body politics by contesting from her ward in the Thalakkulathur Grama Panchayat and was elected its president despite having no prior political experience.

From 2000 to 2005, she chaired the Welfare Standing Committee of the panchayat.

Jameela was elected president of the Chelannur Block Panchayat in 2005 and served until 2010.

She became president of the Kozhikode District Panchayat from 2010 to 2015 and introduced several women friendly programs, including measures to promote financial self reliance for women from economically weaker families and the creation of rest rooms and better infrastructure for girls in schools.

She returned to lead the Kozhikode District Panchayat again from 2019 to 2021.

Within the Communist Party of India (Marxist) she served as a district committee member from 2017 onwards.

In the 2021 Kerala Legislative Assembly election, Jameela contested as the Left Democratic Front (LDF) candidate from the Koyilandy (Quilandy) constituency and won with a majority of 8,472 votes, securing 75,628 votes against 67,156 polled by her United Democratic Front (UDF) rival N. Subrahmanian, while the National Democratic Alliance (NDA) candidate N. P. Radhakrishnan received 17,555 votes.
