= Karat Razak =

Indian politician

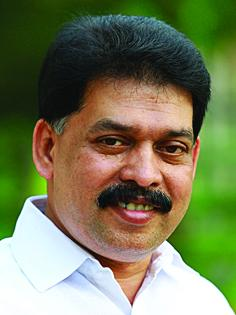

Personal details
- Party: Independent
- Other political affiliations: UDF

Karat Razack is an Indian politician and former MLA of the Kerala legislative assembly. His native place is Koduvally (കൊടുവള്ളി) in Kozhikode district of Kerala. He was a prominent leader of Indian Union Muslim League IUML but contested the 2016 assembly election from Koduvally constituency as an independent supported by the LDF and got elected.

After he was denied a seat by IUML both in 2011 and 2016, he contested as a dissident. LDF announced support and Razak won by 573 votes.

On 25 October 2018, a case was filed by a member of the Koduvally Muslim Students Federation against Razak for allegedly assaulting students inside a college in Koduvally.

In January 2019 the Kerala High Court disqualified Razak as MLA for screening a defamatory video against his election opponent M. A. Razak. On appeal, a division bench stayed the order, with the condition that Karat Razak can participate in Assembly proceedings, but cannot vote or partake in any benefits. 22 of march 2026 he back to Indian Union Muslim League.
