= U. C. Raman =

Indian politician

U. C. Raman (born 31 May 1965) is an Indian politician from Kerala. As of 2011 he was the state president of the Indian Union Dalit League, the Scheduled Caste wing of the Indian Union Muslim League.

Raman was fielded as an independent candidate by the Muslim League for the Kunnamangalam Niyama Sabha constituency in the 2001 Kerala assembly election. At the time Raman served as vice president of the Kunnamangalam Gram Panchayat. In the 2001 election Kunnamangalam had been designated as reserved for a member of a Scheduled Caste, preventing the Muslim League from fielding a Muslim candidate there. The election was hotly contested, and in particular the Bharatiya Janata Party invested a lot in its campaign there (bringing L.K. Advani to campaign for the BJP candidate). In the end U.C. Raman won the seat with a margin of 3,711 votes, defeating the CPI(M) candidate P. Kunhan.

U.C. Raman again won the Kunnamangalam seat in the 2006 election. Raman was the sole United Democratic Front candidate to be elected from Kozhikode district.

In August 2009, Raman was injured in a car accident and hospitalized.

Ahead of the 2011 election Kunnamangalam was converted into a general seat. The Muslim League decided to field U.C. Raman for a third time, breaking with the tradition to field Scheduled Caste leaders only in reserved seats. This was the first time the party fielded a Scheduled Caste candidate in a general seat. He was, however, defeated by the Left Democratic Front-supported independent candidate P.T.A. Rahim by a margin of 3,158 votes. U.C. Raman challenged the poll result, claiming that Rahim had held an office of profit at the time of the nomination. The Kerala High Court upheld the election of Rahim.

U.C. Raman was appointed chairman of the Kerala State Handloom Development Corporation (Hanveev) in December 2011. In February 2012 Raman was selected for the annual Dr. K.R. Narayanan National Foundation award, in honour of his contributions to the Scheduled Caste community.
