= Indian National League =

Indian political party formed in 1994

- President: Mohammad Soleiman
- General Secretary: Ahamed Devarkovil; Mozammil Hussain
- Founder: Ebrahim Sulaiman Sait
- Founded: 23 April 1994 (32 years ago)
- Split from: Indian Union Muslim League
- Student wing: National Students' League
- Youth wing: National Youth League
- Ideology: Secularism; Social justice
- Regional affiliation: Left Democratic Front (LDF) (Kerala)
- Kerala Legislative Assembly: 0 / 140

Party flag
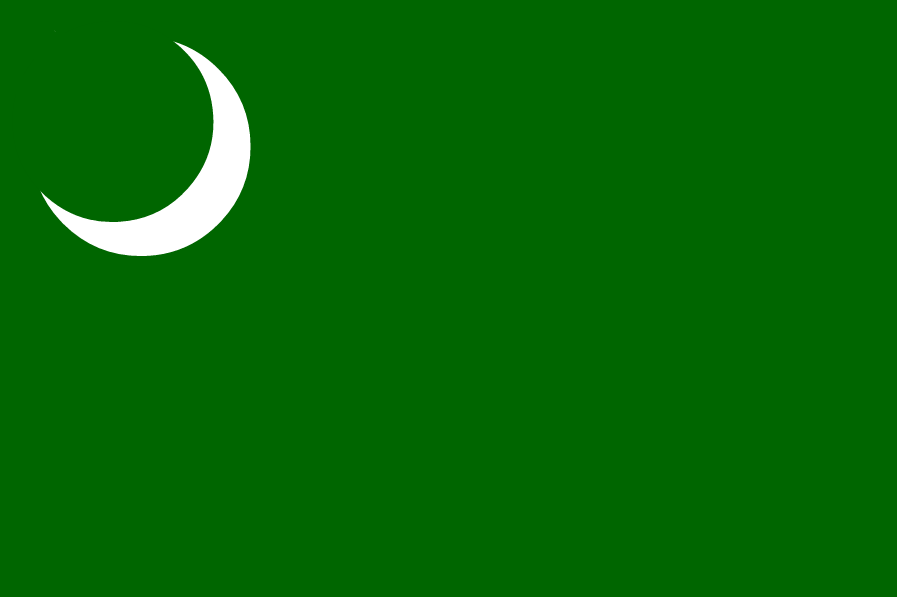

Indian National League (INL) is an Indian political party formed in 1994 under the leadership of the then IUML leader Ebrahim Sulaiman Sait. The party is currently a member of the CPI(M)-led LDF in Kerala. INL leader Ahamed Devarkovil, former MLA from Kozhikode South Constituency, served as a minister in the Second Pinarayi Vijayan ministry.

PMA Salam was the first INL candidate to get elected to the Kerala Assembly (2006). INL was formally inducted into the LDF in the late 2010s.

== History ==
- Indian National League was formed as a reaction to the continued alliance of IUML with INC post Babri Masjid Demolition.
- Opposition raised by several CPIM leaders, who saw the National League as a communal party, ensured that the National League had to stay outside the LDF for over two decades (1994 - 2018).
- The Indian National League mostly allied with the CPIM unofficially in certain seats in the various Kerala Assembly elections between 1994 and 2018.
- Indian National League was associated with the Indian National Congress-led UDF briefly in 2010-11.
- A group led by Abdul Wahab left INL and formed his own party National League.

== Electoral performance ==
Kerala Legislative Assembly election results
Election Year	Alliance	Seats contested	Seats won	Total Votes	Percentage of votes	± Vote
2026	LDF	1	0 / 140	41,885	0.19%	▼0.47%
2021	LDF	3	1 / 140	138,587	0.67%	▲0.12%
2016	LDF	3	0 / 140	112,261	0.55%	▲0.31%
2011	LDF	2	0 / 140	41,368	0.24%	▼0.66%
2006	LDF	3	1 / 140	140,194	0.90%	▲0.61%
2001	LDF	1	0 / 140	45,511	0.29%	▼0.16%
1996	Steady	15	0 / 140	63,975	0.45%	New

== Controversies ==
- It was alleged that INL had 'sold' the post of the member of KPSC for Rs 40 lakh.
