= 15th Kerala Assembly =

2021–2026 Kerala Assembly term

←	14th	16th	→

Overview
- Legislative body: Kerala Legislative Assembly
- Term: 24 May 2021 – 23 May 2026
- Election: 2021 Kerala Legislative Assembly election
- Government: Second Vijayan ministry
- Opposition: UDF
- Members: 140
- Speaker: A. N. Shamseer
- Deputy Speaker: Chittayam Gopakumar
- Leader of the House: Pinarayi Vijayan
- Leader of the Opposition: V. D. Satheesan
- Deputy Leader of the Opposition: P. K. Kunhalikutty
- Chief Whip: N. Jayaraj
- Party control: LDF

The 15th Assembly of Kerala was elected in the 2021 Kerala Legislative Assembly election. The Speaker was A. N. Shamseer of CPI(M). The Deputy Speaker was Chittayam Gopakumar of CPI. The leader of the Assembly was Pinarayi Vijayan from CPI(M). The leader of opposition was V. D. Satheesan of Indian National Congress. The Government Chief Whip was N. Jayaraj of the KEC(M).

== Composition ==
Alliance	Political party	No. of MLAs	Leader of the party
Government; LDF; Seats: 95	Communist Party of India (Marxist)	61	Pinarayi Vijayan (Chief Minister)
Government; LDF; Seats: 95	Communist Party of India	16	Binoy Viswam
Government; LDF; Seats: 95	Kerala Congress (Mani)	5	Jose K. Mani
Government; LDF; Seats: 95	Indian Socialist Janata Dal	2	Mathew T. Thomas
Government; LDF; Seats: 95	Nationalist Congress Party – Sharadchandra Pawar	2	Thomas K. Thomas
Government; LDF; Seats: 95	Congress (Secular)	1	Kadannappalli Ramachandran
Government; LDF; Seats: 95	Indian National League	1	Ahamed Devarkovil
Government; LDF; Seats: 95	Kerala Congress (Balakrishna)	1	K. B. Ganesh Kumar
Government; LDF; Seats: 95	National Secular Conference	1	P. T. A. Rahim
Government; LDF; Seats: 95	Rashtriya Janata Dal	1	K. P. Mohanan
Government; LDF; Seats: 95	Revolutionary Socialist Party (Leninist)	1	Kovoor Kunjumon
Government; LDF; Seats: 95	Independent	3	—N/a
Opposition; UDF; Seats: 41	Indian National Congress	21	V. D. Satheesan (Leader of the Opposition)
Opposition; UDF; Seats: 41	Indian Union Muslim League	15	P. K. Kunhalikutty
Opposition; UDF; Seats: 41	Kerala Congress	2	P. J. Joseph
Opposition; UDF; Seats: 41	Kerala Congress (Jacob)	1	Anoop Jacob
Opposition; UDF; Seats: 41	Kerala Democratic Party	1	Mani C. Kappan
Opposition; UDF; Seats: 41	Revolutionary Marxist Party of India	1	Mangat Ram Pasla
Others; Seats: 1	Independent	1	Rahul Mamkootathil
Vacant; Seats: 3	Koyilandy; Peerumade; Thiruvananthapuram	3	—N/a
Total		140	

== Members of Legislative Assembly ==
District	No.	Constituency	Name	Party	Alliance	Remarks
Kasaragod	1	Manjeshwaram	A. K. M. Ashraf	IUML	UDF	
Kasaragod	2	Kasaragod	N. A. Nellikkunnu	IUML	UDF	
Kasaragod	3	Udma	C. H. Kunhambu	CPI(M)	LDF	
Kasaragod	4	Kanhangad	E. Chandrasekharan	CPI	LDF	
Kasaragod	5	Thrikaripur	M. Rajagopal	CPI(M)	LDF	
Kannur	6	Payyanur	T. I. Madusoodhanan	CPI(M)	LDF	
Kannur	7	Kalliasseri	M. Vijin	CPI(M)	LDF	
Kannur	8	Taliparamba	M. V. Govindan	CPI(M)	LDF	
Kannur	9	Irikkur	Sajeev Joseph	INC	UDF	
Kannur	10	Azhikode	K. V. Sumesh	CPI(M)	LDF	
Kannur	11	Kannur	Kadannappalli Ramachandran	Cong(S)	LDF	
Kannur	12	Dharmadam	Pinarayi Vijayan	CPI(M)	LDF	Chief Minister of Kerala
Kannur	13	Thalassery	A. N. Shamseer	CPI(M)	LDF	
Kannur	14	Mattanur	K. K. Shailaja	CPI(M)	LDF	
Kannur	15	Kuthuparamba	K. P. Mohanan	RJD	LDF	
Kannur	16	Peravoor	Sunny Joseph	INC	UDF	
Wayanad	17	Mananthavady (ST)	O. R. Kelu	CPI(M)	LDF	
Wayanad	18	Sulthan Bathery (ST)	I. C. Balakrishnan	INC	UDF	
Wayanad	19	Kalpetta	T Siddique	INC	UDF	
Kozhikode	20	Vadakara	K. K. Rema	RMPI	UDF	
Kozhikode	21	Kuttiady	K P Kunhammadkutty Master	CPI(M)	LDF	
Kozhikode	22	Nadapuram	E. K. Vijayan	CPI	LDF	
Kozhikode	23	Quilandy	Kanathil Jameela	CPI(M)	LDF	
Kozhikode	23	Quilandy	Vacant			Died on 29 November 2025
Kozhikode	24	Perambra	T. P. Ramakrishnan	CPI(M)	LDF	
Kozhikode	25	Balussery (SC)	K. M. Sachin Dev	CPI(M)	LDF	
Kozhikode	26	Elathur	A. K. Saseendran	NCP-SP	LDF	
Kozhikode	27	Kozhikode North	Thottathil Ravindran	CPI(M)	LDF	
Kozhikode	28	Kozhikode South	Ahamed Devarkovil	INL	LDF	
Kozhikode	29	Beypore	P. A. Mohammed Riyas	CPI(M)	LDF	
Kozhikode	30	Kunnamangalam	P. T. A. Rahim	IND	LDF	
Kozhikode	31	Koduvally	M. K. Muneer	IUML	UDF	
Kozhikode	32	Thiruvambady	Linto Joseph	CPI(M)	LDF	
Malappuram	33	Kondotty	T. V. Ibrahim	IUML	UDF	
Malappuram	34	Eranad	P. K. Basheer	IUML	UDF	
Malappuram	35	Nilambur	Aryadan Shoukath	INC	UDF	
Malappuram	36	Wandoor (SC)	A. P. Anil Kumar	INC	UDF	
Malappuram	37	Manjeri	U. A. Latheef	IUML	UDF	
Malappuram	38	Perinthalmanna	Najeeb Kanthapuram	IUML	UDF	
Malappuram	39	Mankada	Manjalamkuzhi Ali	IUML	UDF	
Malappuram	40	Malappuram	P. Ubaidulla	IUML	UDF	
Malappuram	41	Vengara	P. K. Kunhalikutty	IUML	UDF	Deputy Leader of the Opposition
Malappuram	42	Vallikunnu	P. Abdul Hameed	IUML	UDF	
Malappuram	43	Tirurangadi	K. P. A. Majeed	IUML	UDF	
Malappuram	44	Tanur	V. Abdurahiman	NSC	LDF	
Malappuram	45	Tirur	Kurukkoli Moideen	IUML	UDF	
Malappuram	46	Kottakkal	K. K. Abid Hussain Thangal	IUML	UDF	
Malappuram	47	Thavanur	K.T. Jaleel	IND	LDF	
Malappuram	48	Ponnani	P. Nandakumar	CPI(M)	LDF	
Palakkad	49	Thrithala	M. B. Rajesh	CPI(M)	LDF	
Palakkad	50	Pattambi	Muhammed Muhsin	CPI	LDF	
Palakkad	51	Shornur	P. Mammikutty	CPI(M)	LDF	
Palakkad	52	Ottapalam	K. Premkumar	CPI(M)	LDF	
Palakkad	53	Kongad (SC)	K. Shanthakumari	CPI(M)	LDF	
Palakkad	54	Mannarkkad	N. Samsudheen	IUML	UDF	
Palakkad	55	Malampuzha	A. Prabhakaran	CPI(M)	LDF	
Palakkad	56	Palakkad	Rahul Mamkootathil	IND	UDF	Won in 2024 bypoll
Palakkad	57	Tarur (SC)	P. P. Sumod	CPI(M)	LDF	
Palakkad	58	Chittur	K. Krishnankutty	ISJD	LDF	
Palakkad	59	Nenmara	K. Babu	CPI(M)	LDF	
Palakkad	60	Alathur	K. D. Prasenan	CPI(M)	LDF	
Thrissur	61	Chelakkara (SC)	U. R. Pradeep	CPI(M)	LDF	Won in 2024 bypoll
Thrissur	62	Kunnamkulam	A. C. Moideen	CPI(M)	LDF	
Thrissur	63	Guruvayur	N. K. Akbar	CPI(M)	LDF	
Thrissur	64	Manalur	Murali Perunelli	CPI(M)	LDF	
Thrissur	65	Wadakkanchery	Xavier Chittilappilly	CPI(M)	LDF	
Thrissur	66	Ollur	K. Rajan	CPI	LDF	
Thrissur	67	Thrissur	P. Balachandran	CPI	LDF	
Thrissur	68	Nattika (SC)	C. C. Mukundan	CPI	LDF	
Thrissur	69	Kaipamangalam	E. T. Tyson	CPI	LDF	
Thrissur	70	Irinjalakuda	R. Bindu	CPI(M)	LDF	
Thrissur	71	Puthukkad	K. K. Ramachandran	CPI(M)	LDF	
Thrissur	72	Chalakudy	T. J. Saneesh Kumar Joseph	INC	UDF	
Thrissur	73	Kodungallur	V. R. Sunil Kumar	CPI	LDF	
Ernakulam	74	Perumbavoor	Eldhose Kunnappilly	INC	UDF	
Ernakulam	75	Angamaly	Roji M. John	INC	UDF	
Ernakulam	76	Aluva	Anwar Sadath	INC	UDF	
Ernakulam	77	Kalamassery	P. Rajeeve	CPI(M)	LDF	
Ernakulam	78	Paravur	V. D. Satheesan	INC	UDF	Leader of the Opposition
Ernakulam	79	Vypen	K. N. Unnikrishnan	CPI(M)	LDF	
Ernakulam	80	Kochi	K. J. Maxi	CPI(M)	LDF	
Ernakulam	81	Thrippunithura	K. Babu	INC	UDF	
Ernakulam	82	Ernakulam	T. J. Vinod	INC	UDF	
Ernakulam	83	Thrikkakara	P. T. Thomas	INC	UDF	
Ernakulam	83	Thrikkakara	Uma Thomas	INC	UDF	Won in 2022 bypoll necessitated after the death of P. T. Thomas
Ernakulam	84	Kunnathunad (SC)	P. V. Srinijin	CPI(M)	LDF	
Ernakulam	85	Piravom	Anoop Jacob	KC(J)	UDF	
Ernakulam	86	Muvattupuzha	Mathew Kuzhalnadan	INC	UDF	
Ernakulam	87	Kothamangalam	Antony John	CPI(M)	LDF	
Idukki	88	Devikulam	A. Raja	CPI(M)	LDF	
Idukki	89	Udumbanchola	M. M. Mani	CPI(M)	LDF	
Idukki	90	Thodupuzha	P. J. Joseph	KEC	UDF	
Idukki	91	Idukki	Roshy Augustine	KC(M)	LDF	
Idukki	92	Peerumade	Vazhoor Soman	CPI	LDF	
Idukki	92	Peerumade	Vacant			Died on 21 August 2025
Kottayam	93	Pala	Mani C. Kappan	DCK	UDF	
Kottayam	94	Kaduthuruthy	Monce Joseph	KEC	UDF	
Kottayam	95	Vaikom (SC)	C. K. Asha	CPI	LDF	
Kottayam	96	Ettumanoor	V. N. Vasavan	CPI(M)	LDF	
Kottayam	97	Kottayam	Thiruvanchoor Radhakrishnan	INC	UDF	
Kottayam	98	Puthuppally	Oommen Chandy	INC	UDF	
Kottayam	98	Puthuppally	Chandy Oommen	INC	UDF	Won in 2023 bypoll necessitated after the death of Oommen Chandy
Kottayam	99	Changanassery	Job Maichil	KC(M)	LDF	
Kottayam	100	Kanjirappally	N. Jayaraj	KC(M)	LDF	
Kottayam	101	Poonjar	Sebastian Kulathunkal	KC(M)	LDF	
Alappuzha	102	Aroor	Daleema	CPI(M)	LDF	
Alappuzha	103	Cherthala	P. Prasad	CPI	LDF	
Alappuzha	104	Alappuzha	P. P. Chitharanjan	CPI(M)	LDF	
Alappuzha	105	Ambalappuzha	H. Salam	CPI(M)	LDF	
Alappuzha	106	Kuttanad	Thomas K. Thomas	NCP-SP	LDF	
Alappuzha	107	Haripad	Ramesh Chennithala	INC	UDF	
Alappuzha	108	Kayamkulam	U. Prathibha	CPI(M)	LDF	
Alappuzha	109	Mavelikara	M. S. Arun Kumar	CPI(M)	LDF	
Alappuzha	110	Chengannur	Saji Cherian	CPI(M)	LDF	
Pathanamthitta	111	Thiruvalla	Mathew T. Thomas	ISJD	LDF	
Pathanamthitta	112	Ranni	Pramod Narayan	KC(M)	LDF	
Pathanamthitta	113	Aranmula	Veena George	CPI(M)	LDF	
Pathanamthitta	114	Konni	K. U. Jenish Kumar	CPI(M)	LDF	
Pathanamthitta	115	Adoor	Chittayam Gopakumar	CPI	LDF	
Kollam	116	Karunagapally	C. R. Mahesh	INC	UDF	
Kollam	117	Chavara	Sujith Vijayan	IND	LDF	
Kollam	118	Kunnathur	Kovoor Kunjumon	IND	LDF	
Kollam	119	Kottarakkara	K. N. Balagopal	CPI(M)	LDF	
Kollam	120	Pathanapuram	K. B. Ganesh Kumar	KC(B)	LDF	
Kollam	121	Punalur	P. S. Supal	CPI	LDF	
Kollam	122	Chadayamangalam	J. Chinchu Rani	CPI	LDF	
Kollam	123	Kundara	P. C. Vishnunath	INC	UDF	
Kollam	124	Kollam	M. Mukesh	CPI(M)	LDF	
Kollam	125	Eravipuram	M. Noushad	CPI(M)	LDF	
Kollam	126	Chathannoor	G.S. Jayalal	CPI	LDF	
Thiruvananthapuram	127	Varkala	V. Joy	CPI(M)	LDF	
Thiruvananthapuram	128	Attingal	O. S. Ambika	CPI(M)	LDF	
Thiruvananthapuram	129	Chirayinkeezhu	V. Sasi	CPI	LDF	
Thiruvananthapuram	130	Nedumangad	G. R. Anil	CPI	LDF	
Thiruvananthapuram	131	Vamanapuram	D. K. Murali	CPI(M)	LDF	
Thiruvananthapuram	132	Kazhakootam	Kadakampally Surendran	CPI(M)	LDF	
Thiruvananthapuram	133	Vattiyoorkavu	V. K. Prasanth	CPI(M)	LDF	
Thiruvananthapuram	134	Thiruvananthapuram	Antony Raju	JKC	LDF	
Thiruvananthapuram	134	Thiruvananthapuram	Vacant		LDF	Disqualified due to conviction and jail sentence in underwear theft and evidence tampering case.
Thiruvananthapuram	135	Nemom	V. Sivankutty	CPI(M)	LDF	
Thiruvananthapuram	136	Aruvikkara	G. Steephen	CPI(M)	LDF	
Thiruvananthapuram	137	Parassala	C. K. Hareendran	CPI(M)	LDF	
Thiruvananthapuram	138	Kattakada	I. B. Sathish	CPI(M)	LDF	
Thiruvananthapuram	139	Kovalam	M. Vincent	INC	UDF	
Thiruvananthapuram	140	Neyyattinkara	K. A. Ansalan	CPI(M)	LDF	
