= 16th Kerala Assembly =

2026–2031 Kerala Assembly term

←	15th	17th	→

Overview
- Legislative body: Kerala Legislative Assembly
- Term: 21 May 2026 –
- Election: 2026 Kerala Legislative Assembly election
- Government: Satheesan ministry
- Opposition: LDF
- Members: 140
- Speaker: Thiruvanchoor Radhakrishnan
- Deputy Speaker: Shanimol Osman
- Leader of the House: V. D. Satheesan
- Leader of the Opposition: Pinarayi Vijayan
- Deputy Leader of the Opposition: TBA
- Chief Whip: Apu John Joseph
- Party control: UDF

The 16th Assembly of Kerala is elected in the 2026 Kerala Legislative Assembly election. The Speaker is Thiruvanchoor Radhakrishnan of INC. The Deputy Speaker is Shanimol Osman of INC. The Leader of the Assembly is V. D. Satheesan from INC. The Leader of Opposition is Pinarayi Vijayan of CPI(M). The Government Chief Whip is Apu John Joseph of Kerala Congress.

== Composition ==
Alliance	Political party	No. of MLAs	Leader
Government; UDF; Seats: 102	Indian National Congress	63	V. D. Satheesan
Government; UDF; Seats: 102	Indian Union Muslim League	22	P. K. Kunhalikutty
Government; UDF; Seats: 102	Kerala Congress	7	Mons Joseph
Government; UDF; Seats: 102	Revolutionary Socialist Party	3	Shibu Baby John
Government; UDF; Seats: 102	Kerala Congress (Jacob)	1	Anoop Jacob
Government; UDF; Seats: 102	Revolutionary Marxist Party of India	1	K. K. Rema
Government; UDF; Seats: 102	Communist Marxist Party	1	C. P. John
Government; UDF; Seats: 102	Kerala Democratic Party	1	Mani C. Kappan
Government; UDF; Seats: 102	Independent	3	
Opposition; LDF; Seats: 35	Communist Party of India (Marxist)	26	Pinarayi Vijayan
Opposition; LDF; Seats: 35	Communist Party of India	8	K. Rajan
Opposition; LDF; Seats: 35	Rashtriya Janata Dal	1	P. K. Praveen
Other Opposition; NDA; Seats: 3	Bharatiya Janata Party	3	B. B. Gopakumar

== Members of Legislative Assembly ==
District	No.	Constituency	Name	Party	Alliance	Remarks
Kasaragod	1	Manjeshwaram	A. K. M. Ashraf	IUML	UDF	
Kasaragod	2	Kasaragod	Kallatra Mahin	IUML	UDF	
Kasaragod	3	Udma	K. Neelakandan	INC	UDF	
Kasaragod	4	Kanhangad	Govindan Pallikappil	CPI	LDF	
Kasaragod	5	Thrikaripur	Sandeep Varier	INC	UDF	
Kannur	6	Payyanur	V. Kunhikrishnan	IND	UDF	
Kannur	7	Kalliasseri	M. Vijin	CPI(M)	LDF	
Kannur	8	Taliparamba	T K Govindan Master	IND	UDF	
Kannur	9	Irikkur	Sajeev Joseph	INC	UDF	
Kannur	10	Azhikode	K. V. Sumesh	CPI(M)	LDF	
Kannur	11	Kannur	T.O Mohanan	INC	UDF	
Kannur	12	Dharmadom	Pinarayi Vijayan	CPI(M)	LDF	Leader of the Opposition
Kannur	13	Thalassery	Karayi Rajan	CPI(M)	LDF	
Kannur	14	Kuthuparamba	P. K. Praveen	RJD	LDF	
Kannur	15	Mattanur	V. K. Sanoj	CPI(M)	LDF	
Kannur	16	Peravoor	Adv Sunny Joseph	INC	UDF	Minister for Electricity, Environment & Parliamentary Affairs
Wayanad	17	Mananthavady (ST)	Usha Vijayan	INC	UDF	
Wayanad	18	Sulthan Bathery (ST)	I. C. Balakrishnan	INC	UDF	
Wayanad	19	Kalpetta	T. Siddique	INC	UDF	Minister for Agriculture
Kozhikode	20	Vatakara	K. K. Rema	RMPI	UDF	
Kozhikode	21	Kuttiady	Parakkal Abdulla	IUML	UDF	
Kozhikode	22	Nadapuram	K. M. Abhijith	INC	UDF	
Kozhikode	23	Koyilandy	K. Praveen Kumar	INC	UDF	
Kozhikode	24	Perambra	Fathima Thahiliya	IUML	UDF	
Kozhikode	25	Balussery (SC)	V. T. Sooraj	INC	UDF	
Kozhikode	26	Elathur	Vidya Balakrishnan	INC	UDF	
Kozhikode	27	Kozhikode North	K.Jayanth	INC	UDF	
Kozhikode	28	Kozhikode South	Fyzal Babu	IUML	UDF	
Kozhikode	29	Beypore	P. A. Mohammed Riyas	CPI(M)	LDF	
Kozhikode	30	Kunnamangalam	M. A. Razak Master	IUML	UDF	
Kozhikode	31	Koduvally	P. K. Firos	IUML	UDF	
Kozhikode	32	Thiruvambady	C. K. Kasim	IUML	UDF	
Malappuram	33	Kondotty	T. P Ashrafali	IUML	UDF	
Malappuram	34	Eranad	P. K. Basheer	IUML	UDF	Minister for Public Works Department
Malappuram	35	Nilambur	Aryadan Shoukath	INC	UDF	
Malappuram	36	Wandoor (SC)	A. P. Anil Kumar	INC	UDF	Minister for Revenue
Malappuram	37	Manjeri	M. Rahmathulla	IUML	UDF	
Malappuram	38	Perinthalmanna	Najeeb Kanthapuram	IUML	UDF	
Malappuram	39	Mankada	Manjalamkuzhi Ali	IUML	UDF	
Malappuram	40	Malappuram	P. K. Kunhalikutty	IUML	UDF	Minister for Industries, and Information Technology
Malappuram	41	Vengara	K. M. Shaji	IUML	UDF	Minister for Local Self Governments
Malappuram	42	Vallikkunnu	T. V. Ibrahim	IUML	UDF	
Malappuram	43	Tirurangadi	P. M. A. Sameer	IUML	UDF	
Malappuram	44	Tanur	P. K. Navas	IUML	UDF	
Malappuram	45	Tirur	Kurukkoli Moideen	IUML	UDF	
Malappuram	46	Kottakkal	K. K. Abid Hussain Thangal	IUML	UDF	
Malappuram	47	Thavanur	V. S Joy	INC	UDF	
Malappuram	48	Ponnani	K. P Noushad Ali	INC	UDF	
Palakkad	49	Thrithala	V. T. Balram	INC	UDF	
Palakkad	50	Pattambi	Muhammed Muhsin	CPI	LDF	
Palakkad	51	Shornur	P. Mammikutty	CPI(M)	LDF	
Palakkad	52	Ottapalam	K. Premkumar	CPI(M)	LDF	
Palakkad	53	Kongad (SC)	K. A. Thulasi	INC	UDF	Minister of Scheduled Castes, Scheduled Tribes and Backward Classes Welfare
Palakkad	54	Mannarkkad	N. Samsudheen	IUML	UDF	Minister for General Education, and Minority Affairs
Palakkad	55	Malampuzha	A. Prabhakaran	CPI(M)	LDF	
Palakkad	56	Palakkad	Ramesh Pisharody	INC	UDF	
Palakkad	57	Tarur (SC)	Sumod	CPI(M)	LDF	
Palakkad	58	Chittur	Sumesh Achuthan	INC	UDF	
Palakkad	59	Nenmara	K. Preman	CPI(M)	LDF	
Palakkad	60	Alathur	T. M. Sasi	CPI(M)	LDF	
Thrissur	61	Chelakkara (SC)	U. R. Pradeep	CPI(M)	LDF	
Thrissur	62	Kunnamkulam	A. C. Moideen	CPI(M)	LDF	
Thrissur	63	Guruvayur	N. K. Akbar	CPI(M)	LDF	
Thrissur	64	Manalur	C. Raveendranath	CPI(M)	LDF	
Thrissur	65	Wadakkanchery	Xavier Chittilappilly	CPI(M)	LDF	
Thrissur	66	Ollur	K. Rajan	CPI	LDF	
Thrissur	67	Thrissur	Rajan Pallan	INC	UDF	
Thrissur	68	Nattika (SC)	Geetha Gopi	CPI	LDF	
Thrissur	69	Kaipamangalam	K. K. Valsaraj	CPI	LDF	
Thrissur	70	Irinjalakuda	Thomas Unniyadan	KC	UDF	
Thrissur	71	Puthukkad	K. K. Ramachandran	CPI(M)	LDF	
Thrissur	72	Chalakudy	T. J. Saneesh Kumar Joseph	INC	UDF	
Thrissur	73	Kodungallur	O. J. Janeesh	INC	UDF	Minister of Youth Affairs, Sports, Registration & Museum
Ernakulam	74	Perumbavoor	Manoj Moothedan	INC	UDF	
Ernakulam	75	Angamaly	Roji M. John	INC	UDF	Minister for Higher Education
Ernakulam	76	Aluva	Anwar Sadath	INC	UDF	
Ernakulam	77	Kalamassery	V. E. Abdul Gafoor	IUML	UDF	Minister for Fisheries, Social Justice & Harbour Engineering
Ernakulam	78	Paravur	V. D. Satheesan	INC	UDF	Chief Minister of Kerala
Ernakulam	79	Vypin	Tony Chammany	INC	UDF	
Ernakulam	80	Kochi	Mohammad Shiyas	INC	UDF	
Ernakulam	81	Thrippunithura	Deepak Joy	INC	UDF	
Ernakulam	82	Ernakulam	T. J. Vinod	INC	UDF	
Ernakulam	83	Thrikkakara	Uma Thomas	INC	UDF	
Ernakulam	84	Kunnathunad (SC)	V. P. Sajeendran	INC	UDF	
Ernakulam	85	Piravom	Anoop Jacob	KC(J)	UDF	Minister of Food, Civil Supplies & Consumer Affairs
Ernakulam	86	Muvattupuzha	Mathew Kuzhalnadan	INC	UDF	
Ernakulam	87	Kothamangalam	Shibu Thekkumpuram	KEC	UDF	
Idukki	88	Devikulam (SC)	F Raja	INC	UDF	
Idukki	89	Udumbanchola	Senapathy Venu	INC	UDF	
Idukki	90	Thodupuzha	Apu John Joseph	KC	UDF	Government Chief Whip
Idukki	91	Idukki	Roy K Paulose	INC	UDF	
Idukki	92	Peerumade	Cyriac Thomas	INC	UDF	
Kottayam	93	Pala	Mani C. Kappan	DCK	UDF	
Kottayam	94	Kaduthuruthy	Mons Joseph	KEC	UDF	Minister of Irrigation & Housing
Kottayam	95	Vaikom (SC)	K. Binimon	INC	UDF	
Kottayam	96	Ettumanoor	Nattakom Suresh	INC	UDF	
Kottayam	97	Kottayam	Thiruvanchoor Radhakrishnan	INC	UDF	Speaker
Kottayam	98	Puthuppally	Chandy Oommen	INC	UDF	
Kottayam	99	Changanassery	Vinu Job Kuzhimannil	KEC	UDF	
Kottayam	100	Kanjirappally	Rony K Baby	INC	UDF	
Kottayam	101	Poonjar	Sebastian M. J.	INC	UDF	
Alappuzha	102	Aroor	Shanimol Osman	INC	UDF	Deputy Speaker
Alappuzha	103	Cherthala	P. Prasad	CPI	LDF	
Alappuzha	104	Alappuzha	A.D.Thomas	INC	UDF	
Alappuzha	105	Ambalappuzha	G. Sudhakaran	IND	UDF	
Alappuzha	106	Kuttanad	Reji Cheriyan	KC	UDF	
Alappuzha	107	Haripad	Ramesh Chennithala	INC	UDF	Minister for Home, Vigilance, and Coir
Alappuzha	108	Kayamkulam	M. Liju	INC	UDF	Minister of Excise & Cooperation
Alappuzha	109	Mavelikara (SC)	M. S. Arun Kumar	CPI(M)	LDF	
Alappuzha	110	Chengannur	Saji Cherian	CPI(M)	LDF	
Pathanamthitta	111	Thiruvalla	Varghese Mammen	KC	UDF	
Pathanamthitta	112	Ranni	Pazhakulam Madhu	INC	UDF	
Pathanamthitta	113	Aranmula	Abin Varkey	INC	UDF	
Pathanamthitta	114	Konni	K. U. Jenish Kumar	CPI(M)	LDF	
Pathanamthitta	115	Adoor (SC)	Adv. C. V. Santhakumar	INC	UDF	
Kollam	116	Karunagapally	C. R. Mahesh	INC	UDF	
Kollam	117	Chavara	Shibu Baby John	RSP	UDF	Minister of Forests & Widlife Protection
Kollam	118	Kunnathur (SC)	Ullas Kovoor	RSP	UDF	
Kollam	119	Kottarakkara	K. N. Balagopal	CPI(M)	LDF	
Kollam	120	Pathanapuram	Jyothi Kumar Chamakkala	INC	UDF	
Kollam	121	Punalur	C. Ajayaprasad	CPI	LDF	
Kollam	122	Chadayamangalam	M. M. Naseer	INC	UDF	
Kollam	123	Kundara	P. C. Vishnunadh	INC	UDF	Minister of Tourism, Culture & Cinema
Kollam	124	Kollam	Bindu Krishna	INC	UDF	Minister of Labour, Dairy Development, Women & Child Development & Animal Husbandry
Kollam	125	Eravipuram	Vishnu Mohan	RSP	UDF	
Kollam	126	Chathannoor	B. B. Gopakumar	BJP	NDA	BJP parliamentary party leader of Kerala.
Thiruvananthapuram	127	Varkala	V. Joy	CPI(M)	LDF	
Thiruvananthapuram	128	Attingal	O. S. Ambika	CPI(M)	LDF	
Thiruvananthapuram	129	Chirayinkeezhu (SC)	Ramya Haridas	INC	UDF	
Thiruvananthapuram	130	Nedumangad	G. R. Anil	CPI	LDF	
Thiruvananthapuram	131	Vamanapuram	Sudheersha Palode	INC	UDF	
Thiruvananthapuram	132	Kazhakkoottam	V. Muraleedharan	BJP	NDA	
Thiruvananthapuram	133	Vattiyoorkavu	K. Muraleedharan	INC	UDF	Minister of Health & Devaswoms
Thiruvananthapuram	134	Thiruvananthapuram	C. P. John	CMP	UDF	Minister of Transport
Thiruvananthapuram	135	Nemom	Rajeev Chandrasekhar	BJP	NDA	
Thiruvananthapuram	136	Aruvikkara	G. Steephen	CPI(M)	LDF	
Thiruvananthapuram	137	Parassala	C. K. Hareendran	CPI(M)	LDF	
Thiruvananthapuram	138	Kattakkada	M. R. Baiju	INC	UDF	
Thiruvananthapuram	139	Kovalam	M. Vincent	INC	UDF	
Thiruvananthapuram	140	Neyyattinkara	N. Sakthan	INC	UDF	
