= P. Ramalingom =

Indian politician

Member of the Kerala Legislative Assembly
- In office 1967–1970
- Preceded by: Constituency established
- Succeeded by: Thengamam Balakrishnan
- Constituency: Adoor

Personal details
- Born: February 1916
- Died: 27 July 2006 (aged 90)

P. Ramalingom (February 1916 – 27 July 2006) was an Indian politician and leader of Communist Party of India (CPI). He represented Adoor constituency in 3rd Kerala Legislative Assembly elected in the 1967 Kerala Legislative Assembly election.

== Political career ==
Ramalingam joined the Travancore State Congress in 1939 and joined the Communist Party of India in 1941. Member of AITUC the State Council. He has also served as a State Council Member of CPI, Plantation Corporation Board Member, Kencos Chairman, Ezhamkulam Grama Panchayat President, Kunnathoor Plantation Workers Union Founding President and Central Wage Board for Rubber Industry member.

He died on 27 July 2006.
