= Chittayam Gopakumar =

Indian politician

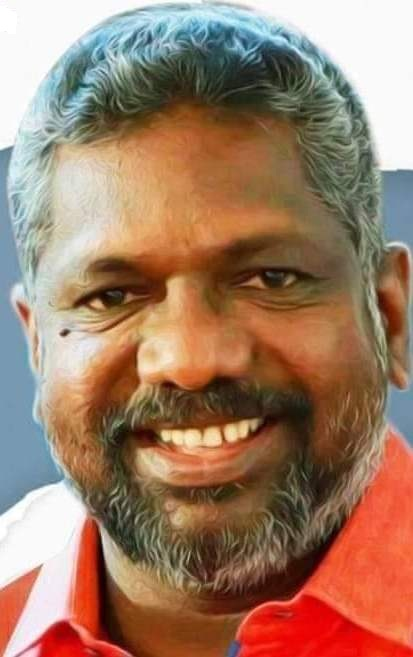

Deputy Speaker, Kerala Legislative Assembly
- In office 1 June 2021 – 4 May 2026
- Speaker: A. N. Shamseer
- Preceded by: V. Sasi
- Succeeded by: Shanimol Osman

Member of the Kerala Legislative Assembly
- In office 1 June 2011 – 04 May 2026
- Chief Minister: Pinarayi Vijayan
- Preceded by: Thiruvanchoor Radhakrishnan
- Succeeded by: C. V. Santhakumar
- Constituency: Adoor

Personal details
- Born: 30 May 1965 (age 61) Kottarakkara, Kollam, Kerala, India
- Party: Communist Party of India
- Spouse: C. Sherlley Bai
- Children: 2

Chittayam Gopakumar (born 30 May 1965) is an Indian politician who belongs to the Communist Party of India. He served as a member in Kerala Legislative Assembly representing Adoor from 2011 to 2026. He was the Deputy Speaker during the 15th Kerala Assembly.

He contested in the 2019 Indian general election in Kerala as a candidate from Mavelikara but lost to Kodikunnil Suresh from the Indian National Congress.

== Personal life ==
He was born on 30 May 1965, as son of T. Gopalakrishnan and T. K. Devayani, at Chittayam in Kollam District. He completed Pre-degree from St. Gregorios College, Kottarakkara but was not able to study further due to poor financial situation of his family. He is married to C. Sherlley Bai. They have two daughters, Anooja and Amrita.

== Political career ==
Chittayam Gopakumar entered politics through All India Students Federation (AISF), during his school days. He became the state committee member of AISF. He later joined All India Trade Union Congress (AITUC) and started organising trade union movements. He became AITUC state working committee member. He was the state secretary of Kerala Kashuvandi Thozhilali Kendra Council (Kerala Cashew Workers central union), State President of Asha Workers Union and Kollam district president of Kerala State Karshaka Thozhilali Federation (BKMU). At 18 years age, he joined Communist Party of India (CPI) as a branch committee member. He is now the state council member of CPI.

In 2011, CPI put him as a candidate from Adoor constituency, for the Kerala Legislative assembly election. He won the seat with a margin of 607 votes, by defeating the Congress candidate Pandalam Sudhakaran.

During that period, he became the Chairman of the committee on Welfare of Backward class communities.

In 2016, he was again re-elected from the same constituency with a bigger margin of 25,460 votes, defeating Congress candidate K.K. Shaju.

In the 2019 Parliament election, he lost to Congress candidate and sitting MP Kodikkunnil Suresh from Mavelikara Loksabha constituency with a bigger margin of 61,138 votes.[7] In the 2021 Kerala legislative assembly elections he was re-elected again from the Adoor constituency by defeating the congress candidate M G Kannan with a margin of 2919 votes.
