= Pattiam Gopalan =

Indian politician (1936–1978)

Pattiam Gopalan (6 October 1936 – 27 September 1978) was an Indian politician, belonging to the Communist Party of India (Marxist). He was a member of the Kerala State Committee of the party.

== Life and career ==
Pattiam Gopalan was born on 6 October 1936 in Pattiam, Kannur. Pattiam Gopalan joined the Communist Party of India in 1957. He obtained a Post Graduate degree. He was an alumnus of Government Brennen College, Thalassery, where he did his MA in history.

An intellectual politician, Gopalan sided with CPI(M) in the party split, was held in detention for 16 months during 1964-1965. While he was in jail, he won the 1965 election to the state assembly from Thalassery constituency. But that year the state assembly was not convened and for the next two years Kerala remained under President's rule. He was later elected to the Lok Sabha from the Thalassery constituency in the 1967 Indian general election.

Gopalan was elected to the Kerala Legislative Assembly in the 1977 election, representing the Tellicherry constituency.

Gopalan died on 27 September 1978, at the age of 41. His younger brother Pattiam Rajan was a Member of the Rajya Sabha (1975-1981). Gopalan was married to Professor NK Mridula with whom he had three children. Journalist and author Ullekh NP is his oldest son.

The Pattiam Gopalan Memorial Club presents a Pattiam Gopalan Memorial Award annually.
