= Malloossery =

- town
- Location in Kerala, India Malloossery (India)
- Coordinates: 9°36′0″N 76°31′0″E
- Country: India
- State: Kerala
- District: Kottayam

Languages
  - Official: Malayalam, English
- Time zone: UTC+5:30 (IST)
- Vehicle registration: KL-

Malloossery is a small village in Kottayam district of Kerala state, south India. It is close to Kottayam. Private buses that travel to this small village from Kottayam city. It is mainly an agriculture based village, but the new generation is leaving this field and looking for professional jobs. Christians, Hindus and Muslims live together here . St. Thomas Catholic Church, St. Sebastian's Catholic Church, St. George Knanaya Jacobite Chappel, Thidamboor Temple, Malloorkulangara Mahadeva Temple and Malloossery Juma Masjid are the main worship centres. The Feast of St. Mary at St. Thomas Catholic Church is very famous here.

== Administration ==
Malloossery is a part of Kumaranalloor Grama Panchayat(Now this panchayat merged to Kottayam Municipality in 2011, Perumbaikkad Village, Kottayam Thaluk. It is part of Kottayam Legislative Assembly and Kottayam Parliament Seat. Thiruvanchoor Radhakrishnan is the Member of the legislative assembly and Jose K Mani is the Member of parliament.

== Geography ==
The Meenachil river flows near Malloossery. This area is predominantly of Hindu population. Famous Siva temple Thidamboor Mahadeva temple and Malloorkulangara Siva Temple situate in this village. St. Thomas L.P School serve the basic educational needs of this village. CMS College High School and CMS College are quite close to Malloossery. MG University Campus also situated here mainly School of Social Science and Applied Science (Pullarikunnu). Chungom junction and Varissery junction of Kottayam-Kudayampadi route are part of this village.
