= Thennala Balakrishna Pillai =

Indian politician (1930–2025)

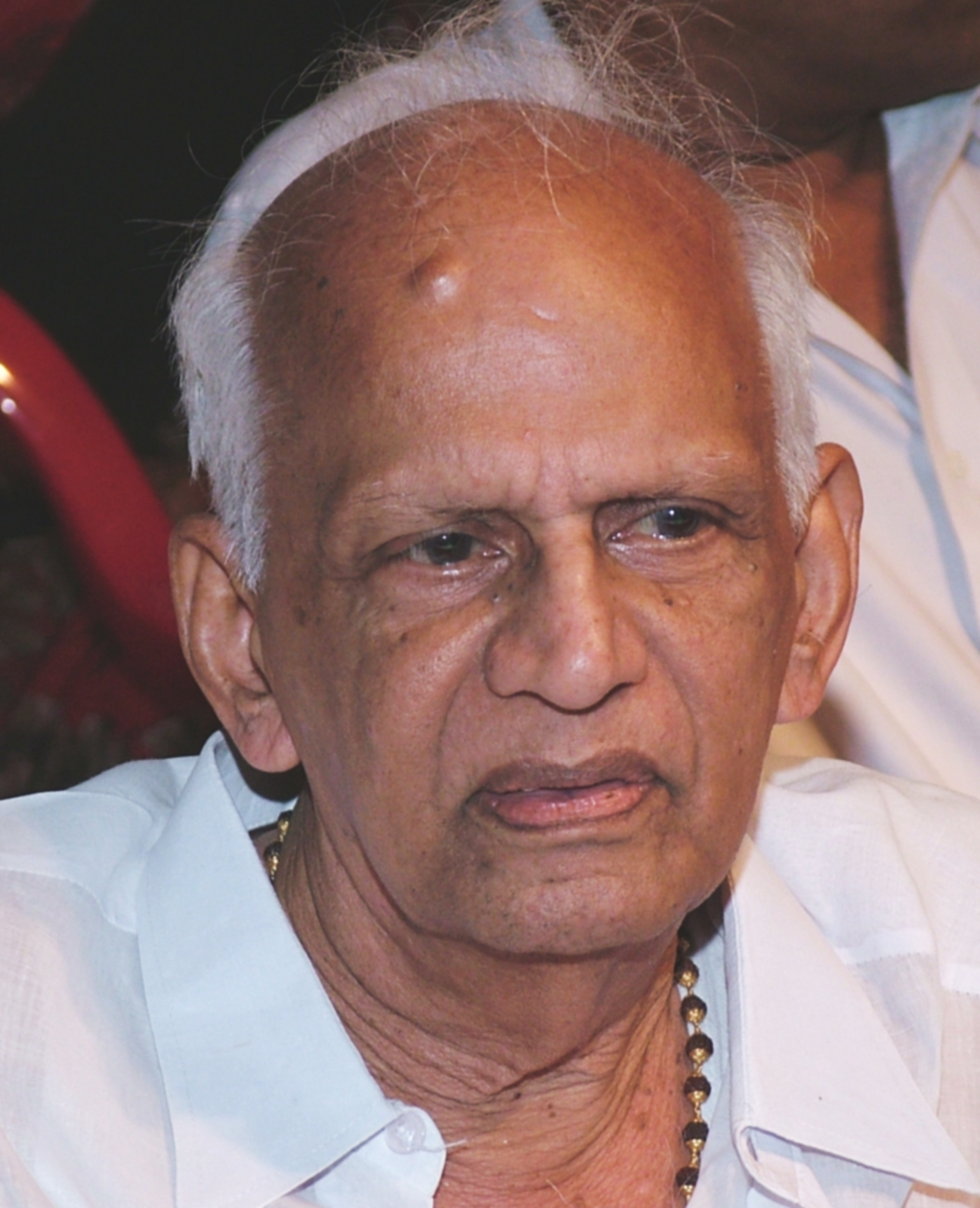

Member of Parliament, Rajya Sabha
- In office 22 April 2003 – 21 April 2009
- Constituency: Kerala
- In office 30 July 1991 – 2 April 1998
- Constituency: Kerala

Member of the Kerala Legislative Assembly
- In office 1982 – 1987
- Preceded by: C. P. Karunakaran Pillai
- Succeeded by: R. Unnikrishnan Pillai
- Constituency: Adoor
- In office 1977 – 1980
- Preceded by: Thengamam Balakrishnan
- Succeeded by: C. P. Karunakaran Pillai
- Constituency: Adoor

President, Kerala Pradesh Congress Committee
- In office 2004 – 2005
- Preceded by: P. P. Thankachan
- Succeeded by: Ramesh Chennithala
- In office 1998 – 2001
- Preceded by: Vayalar Ravi
- Succeeded by: K. Muraleedharan

Personal details
- Born: 11 March 1930 Quilon, Kingdom of Travancore, India (present-day Sooranad, Kollam, Kerala, India)
- Died: 6 June 2025 (aged 95) Thiruvananthapuram, Kerala, India
- Spouse: Sathi Devi (m. 1963)
- Children: 1
- Parents: N. Gopala Pillai; N. Eswari Amma
- Education: Mahatma Gandhi College, Thiruvananthapuram

Thennala Balakrishna Pillai (11 March 1930 – 6 June 2025) was an Indian politician from Kollam representing the Indian National Congress who was a Member of the Parliament, representing Kerala in the Rajya Sabha, the upper house of the Indian Parliament. He was the president of Kerala Pradesh Congress Committee. (KPCC) 1998–2001 and 2004–2005.

Pillai died at Thiruvananthapuram on 6 June 2025, at the age of 95.

== Early life ==
He was born at Sooranad, Kollam, Kingdom of Travancore in a Nair family on 11 March 1930, as the son of N. Gopala Pillai and N. Eswari Amma and brought up there. He got married on 3 July 1963 to Sathi Devi and they had one daughter. He held a B.Sc. degree from Mahatma Gandhi College, Thiruvananthapuram.

== Political career ==
Pillai started his political life from very young age. He was elected as:

- President of Sooranadu, Pulikulam ward Congress committee. President of Mandalam Congress committee of Sooranadu North in Kollam district.
- President of Kunnathur Block Congress Committee.
- President Anayadi Corporative service Bank, Sooranadu North
- President Engineering Technicians Co-operative society
- President District Co-operative Bank, Pathanamthitta
- Vice President District Co-operative Bank, Kollam
- Chairman Disciplinary Action Committee constituted by KPCC to recommend action against those who worked against those who contested and worked against the official candidates in the local bodies elections held in the year 1989 and again in 1996.
- Chairman Committee constituted by KPCC to scrutinise the membership of the party in its organisational election.
- Chairman Committee constituted by KPCC to go into allegations against Ministers for their interference in organisational election.
- Chairman Committee constituted by KPCC to enquire into the reasons for the failure of CWC Member Shri. K. Karunakaran in Thrissur Parliament Elections
- Chairman State Campaign Committee Chairman in 1996 Elections
- Convener Congress MPs from Kerala
- KPCC Member since 1962
- Treasurer District Congress Committee, Kollam
- President of the Kollam DCC for 5.5 years
- General Secretary, Kerala Pradesh Congress (I) Committee (K.P.C.C.) (1981–92)
- Chairman Scrutiny Committee of KPCC for the organisational election (1990–1992)
- Chairman, Disciplinary Action Committee of the KPCC (1998–2001)
- President KPCC (1998–2001)
- Member of the Kerala Legislative Assembly from Adoor Constituency (1977–80 and 1982–87)
- July 1991 Elected to the Rajya Sabha
- Member, Rubber Board
- April 1992 Re-elected to Rajya Sabha
- April 2003 Re-elected to Rajya Sabha
- Member, Sree Chitra Tirunal Institute for Medical Sciences and Technology, Thiruvananthapuram
- Member Committee on Urban and Rural Development (April 1993 – April 1998)
- Consultative Committee for the Ministry of Urban and Rural Development
- Member, Joint Committee of the Houses of Parliament committee on salaries and allowance of the members of parliament (1992–1998)
- Member, National River Conservation Authority
- Member, Petition Committee of Rajya Sabha
- Member Managing Committee State Co-operative Union Kerala
- Member, Committee on Commerce
- Member, Consultative Committee for the Ministry of Agriculture and Ministry of Consumer Affairs
- Member, National Shipping Board
- Member, Philatelic Advisory Committee
- Member, Sub Committee for Special Economic Zones.
- President Akhila Kerala Ayyyappa Seva Sangham
