= K. O. Aysha Bai =

Indian politician

1st Deputy Speaker of Kerala Legislative Assembly
- In office 6 May 1957 – 31 July 1959
- Chief Minister: E. M. S. Namboodiripad
- Preceded by: Office Established
- Succeeded by: A. Nafeesath Beevi
- Constituency: Kayamkulam

Personal details
- Born: 25 October 1926
- Died: 28 October 2005
- Party: Communist Party of India
- Spouse: K. Abdul Razzak
- Education: Women's College and University College, Trivandrum; Law College, Ernakulam

K. O. Aysha Bai (25 October 1926 – 28 October 2005), also spelled Ayesha Bai, was a Communist politician from south India. She rose to popularity because of her confidence and public speaking prowess. She was the first Deputy Speaker of the Kerala Legislative Assembly (6 May 1957 – 31 July 1959). Aysha Bai was the first Muslim woman to rise to public fame in modern Kerala. She was an aggressive advocate for the progress of Mappila women. She was also a pioneer organizer of Women's Societies (Mahila Samajams). She inspired countless people to be public speakers and helped the lives of other people while doing so.

== Life ==
Bai had her education at Women's College and University College, Trivandrum and Law College, Ernakulam (B. A. and B. L.). She participated in the Students Congress in 1947.

Bai joined the Communist Party of India (CPI) in 1953 and was elected as representative from Kayamkulam Constituency to the Kerala Legislative Assembly (KLA) in 1957, serving two terms (in first and second KLAs). She served as Deputy Speaker of the Assembly from May 1957 until July 1959. She served as chairperson of the Committee on Government Assurances from 1961 to 1963. She was State Vice President, Kerala Mahila Sangham – Communist Party of India, Member, Central and State Social Welfare Boards and State Watchdog Committee on Prisons.

Bai was born to K. Usman Sahib and Fathima Beevi. She was married to K. Abdul Razzak and they have two daughters and two sons. The house she lived in as a child still exists in Kerala.
