= List of speakers of the Kerala Legislative Assembly =

Speaker of the Kerala Legislative Assembly
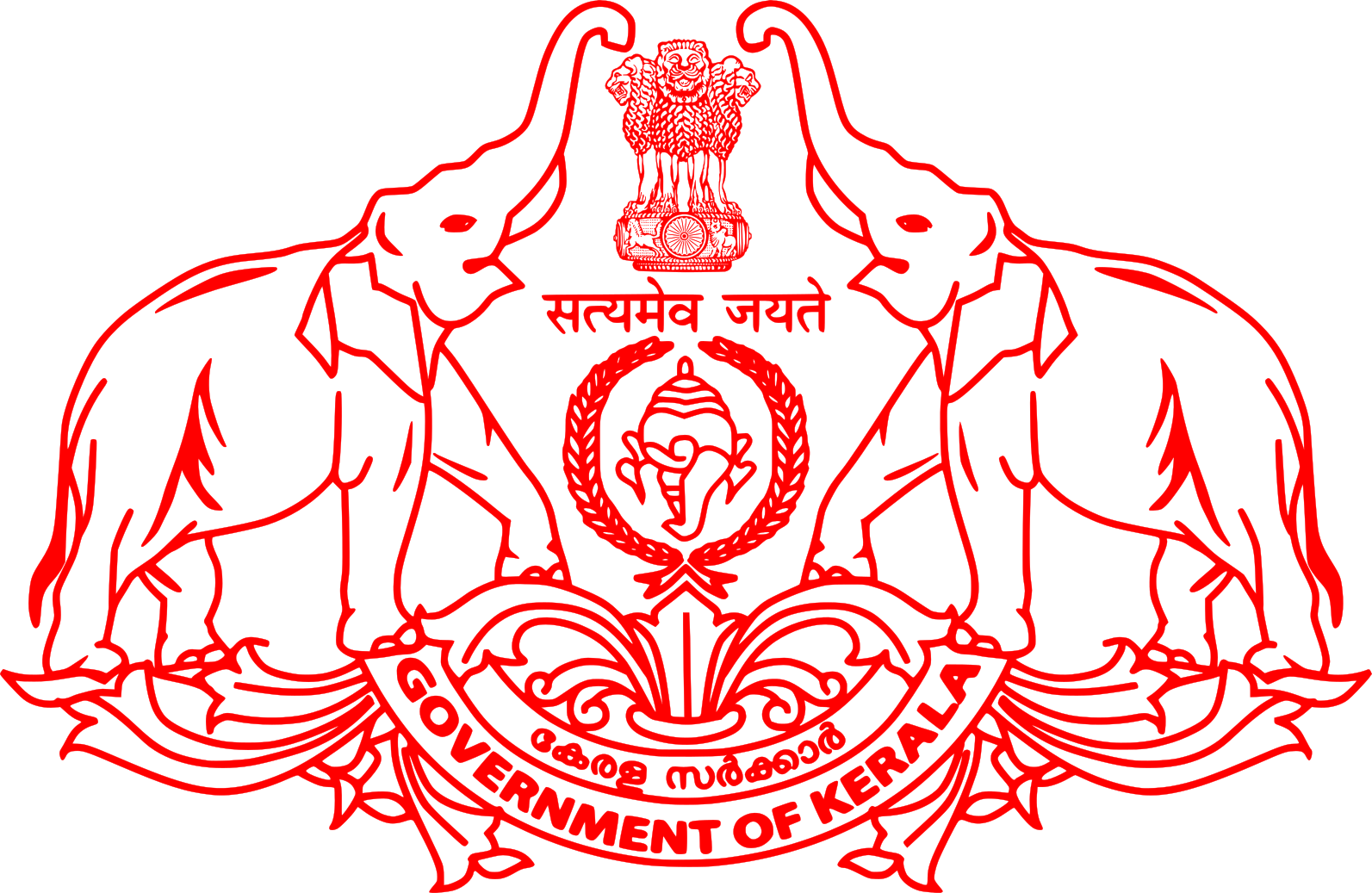

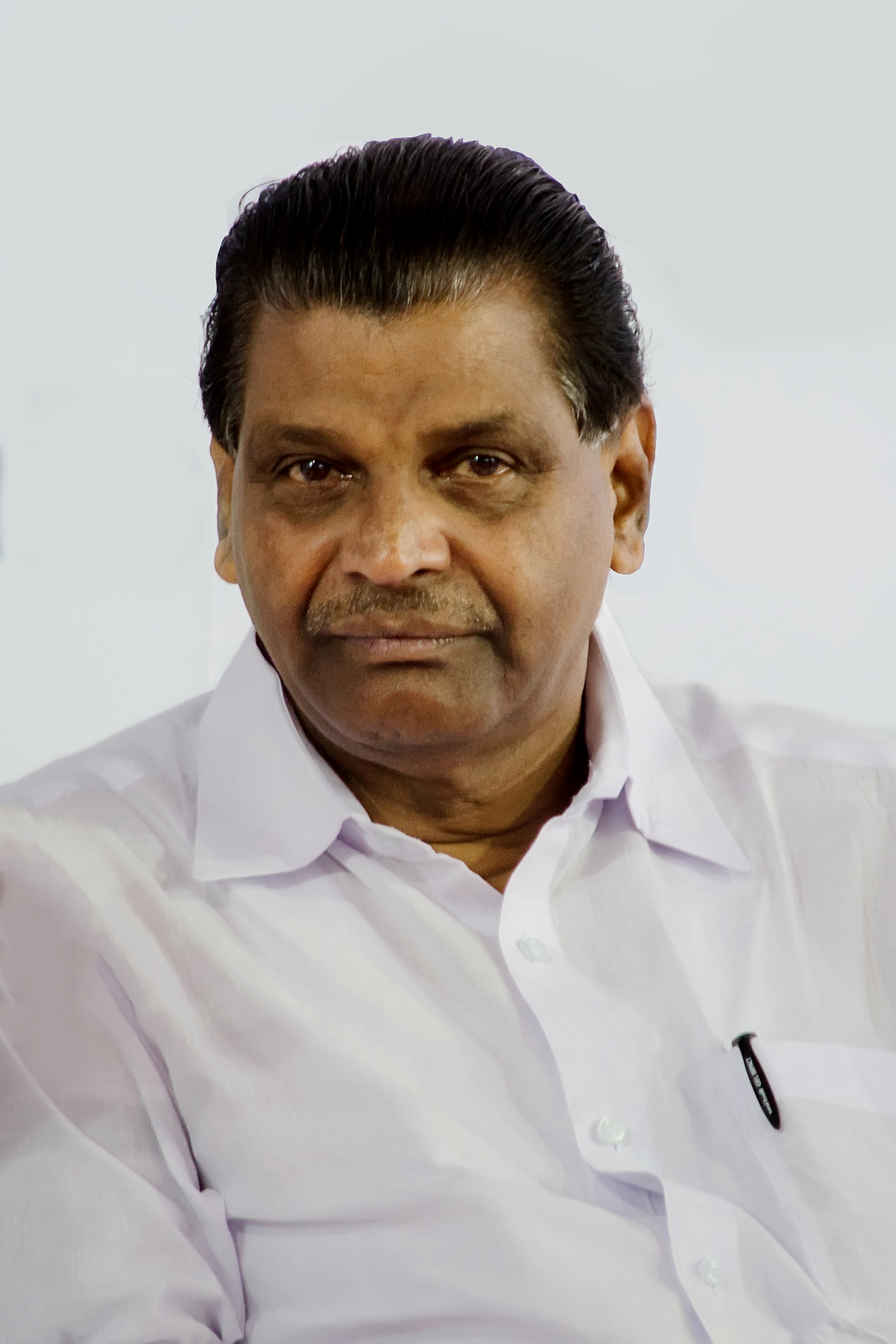
- Incumbent; Thiruvanchoor Radhakrishnan since 22 May 2026
- Kerala Legislative Assembly; Council of Ministers
- Style: Honourable; His/Her Excellency
- Type: Speaker
- Status: Presiding officer of the Legislative Assembly; Cabinet Rank position
- Member of: Kerala Legislative Assembly
- Residence: Neethi House, Thiruvananthapuram
- Seat: Kerala Niyamasabha, Thiruvananthapuram
- Appointer: Members of the Kerala Legislative Assembly
- Term length: During the life of the Kerala Legislative Assembly (five years maximum)
- Inaugural holder: R. Sankara Narayanan Thampi
- Deputy: Shanimol Osman

Speaker of the Kerala Legislative Assembly is the presiding officer of the Legislative Assembly of the state of Kerala, the main law-making body for the Kerala. The speaker is elected by the members of the Kerala Legislative Assembly. The speaker is always a member of the Legislative Assembly.

== Eligibility ==
The Speaker of the Assembly:

- Must be a citizen of India;
- Must not be less than 25 years of age; and
- Should not hold any office of profit under the Government of Kerala.

== Powers and Functions of the Speaker ==
The speaker of the legislative assembly conducts the business in house, and decides whether a bill is a money bill or not. They maintain discipline and decorum in the house and can punish a member for their unruly behaviour by suspending them. They also permit the moving of various kinds of motions and resolutions such as a motion of no confidence, motion of adjournment, motion of censure and calling attention notice as per the rules. The speaker decides on the agenda to be taken up for Further, all comments and speeches made by members of the House are addressed to the speaker. The speaker is answerable to the house. Both the speaker and deputy speaker may be removed by a resolution passed by the majority of the members.

== List of Speakers ==
Assembly	Name	Constituency	From	To	Party
1st (1957 election)	R. Sankara Narayanan Thampi	Chengannur	27 April 1957	31 July 1959	Communist Party of India
2nd (1960 election)	K. M. Seethi Sahib	Kuttippuram	22 February 1960	17 April 1961	Indian Union Muslim League
2nd (1960 election)	CH Mohammed Koya	Tanur	9 June 1961	10 November 1961	Independent
2nd (1960 election)	Alexander Parambithara	Palluruthy	13 December 1961	10 September 1964	Indian National Congress
3rd (1967 election)	D. Damodaran Potti	Chadayamangalam	15 March 1967	21 October 1970	Samayukta Socialist Party
4th (1970 election)	K. Moideenkutty Haji	Tirur	22 October 1970	8 May 1975	Indian Union Muslim League
4th (1970 election)	S. John	Kallooppara	17 February 1976	25 March 1977	Kerala Congress
5th (1977 election)	C A Kutty	Kuttippuram	28 March 1977	14 February 1980	Indian Union Muslim League
6th (1980 election)	A. P. Kurian	Angamali	15 February 1980	20 October 1981	Communist Party of India (Marxist)
6th (1980 election)	A. C. Jose	Parur	3 February 1982	23 June 1982	Indian National Congress
7th (1982 election)	Vakkom Purushothaman	Attingal	24 June 1982	28 December 1984	Indian National Congress
7th (1982 election)	V. M. Sudheeran	Manalur	8 March 1985	27 March 1987	Indian National Congress
8th (1987 election)	Varkala Radhakrishnan	Varkala	30 March 1987	28 June 1991	Communist Party of India (Marxist)
9th (1991 election)	P.P. Thankachan	Perumbavoor	1 July 1991	3 May 1995	Indian National Congress
9th (1991 election)	Therambil Ramakrishnan	Thrissur	27 June 1995	28 May 1996	Indian National Congress
10th (1996 election)	M. Vijayakumar	Trivandrum North	30 May 1996	4 June 2001	Communist Party of India (Marxist)
11th (2001 election)	Shri Vakkom B. Purushothaman	Attingal	17 May 2001	4 September 2004	Indian National Congress
11th (2001 election)	Therambil Ramakrishnan	Thrissur	16 September 2004	24 May 2006	Indian National Congress
12th (2006 election)	K. Radhakrishnan	Chelakkara	6 June 2006	18 May 2011	Communist Party of India (Marxist)
13th (2011 election)	G. Karthikeyan	Aruvikkara	2 June 2011	7 March 2015	Indian National Congress
13th (2011 election)	N. Sakthan	Kattakada	12 March 2015	1 June 2016	Indian National Congress
14th (2016 election	P. Sreeramakrishnan	Ponnani	3 June 2016	23 May 2021	Communist Party of India (Marxist)
15th (2021 election)	M B Rajesh	Thrithala	25 May 2021	2 September 2022	Communist Party of India (Marxist)
15th (2021 election)	A. N. Shamseer	Thalassery	12 September 2022	18 May 2026	Communist Party of India (Marxist)
16th (2026 election)	Thiruvanchoor Radhakrishnan	Kottayam	23 May 2026	Incumbent	Indian National Congress

== Deputy Speaker ==
Deputy Speaker of the Kerala Legislative Assembly of Kerala Legislative Assembly
- Incumbent; Shanimol Osman since 18 May 2026
- Formation: 1957
- Website: niyamasabha.nic.in

== List of Deputy Speakers ==
The following is a chronological list of official Deputy Speakers of the Kerala Legislative Assembly since 1957.

No.	Name	Term of Office		Party
1	K. O. Aysha Bai Kayamkulam	13 May 1957	31 July 1959	Communist Party of India
2	A. Nafeesath Beevi	2 March 1960	10 September 1964	Indian National Congress
3	M. P. Mohammed Jaffar Khan	20 March 1967	26 June 1970	Muslim League
4	R. S. Unni	30 October 1970	22 March 1977	Revolutionary Socialist Party
5	P. K. Gopalakrishnan	6 July 1977	30 November 1979	Communist Party of India
6	M. J. Zakharia Sait	15 February 1980	1 February 1982	All India Muslim League
7	A. C. Jose	3 February 1982	23 June 1982	INC (A)
8	K. M. Hamza Kunju	30 June 1982	25 March 1987	Muslim League
9	Bhargavi Thankappan	2 April 1987	5 April 1991	Communist Party of India
10	K. Narayana Kurup	1 July 1991	14 May 1996	Kerala Congress (M)
11	C. A. Kurian	17 July 1996	16 May 2001	Communist Party of India
12	N. Sundaran Nadar	4 July 2001	12 May 2006	Indian National Congress
13	Jose Baby	20 June 2006	14 May 2011	Communist Party of India
14	N. Sakthan	28 June 2011	10 February 2015	Indian National Congress
15	Palode Ravi	2 December 2015	20 May 2016	Indian National Congress
16	V. Sasi	29 June 2016	3 May 2021	Communist Party of India
17	Chittayam Gopakumar	1 June 2021	04 May 2026	Communist Party of India
18	Shanimol Osman	22 May 2026	Incumbent	Indian National Congress

=== Notes ===
- K. O. Aysha Bai was the first woman to hold the post of Deputy Speaker in the Kerala Legislative Assembly.
- In January 2026, an all-woman panel of chairpersons was constituted to preside over the House in the absence of the Speaker and Deputy Speaker.

== Pro tem Speaker ==
=== List of Pro tem Speakers ===
- S. Sharma 2016
- P. T. A. Rahim 2021
- G. Sudhakaran 2026
