= A. N. Shamseer =

Indian politician (born 1977)

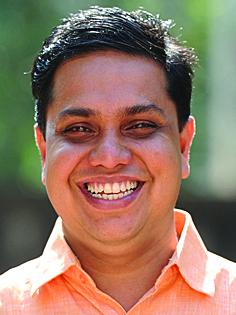
- An Indian politician. He was the 24th Speaker of the 15th Kerala Legislative Assembly.

Speaker of the Kerala Legislative Assembly
- In office 12 September 2022 – 22 May 2026
- Leader of the House: Pinarayi Vijayan
- Deputy Speaker: Chittayam Gopakumar
- Preceded by: M. B. Rajesh
- Succeeded by: G. Sudhakaran (Pro-tem Speaker); Thiruvanchoor Radhakrishnan (Speaker)

Member of the Kerala Legislative Assembly
- In office 2 June 2016 – 21 May 2026
- Preceded by: Kodiyeri Balakrishnan
- Succeeded by: Karayi Rajan
- Constituency: Thalassery

Personal details
- Born: 24 May 1977 (age 49) Thalassery, Kerala, India
- Party: Communist Party of India (Marxist)
- Spouse: Dr. P. M. Sahala
- Children: Izaan Shamseer

A. N. Shamseer (born 24 May 1977) is an Indian politician who served as the 24th Speaker of the Kerala Legislative Assembly from 2022 to 2026. He represented Thalassery State Assembly Constituency from 2016 to 2026. He was the CPI(M) nominee for Lok Sabha in the Vadakara Lok Sabha constituency in the 2014 Indian general election and is Kerala State Committee member of the Communist Party of India (Marxist) (CPI(M)). He was the former President of Kerala lobby of the Democratic Youth Federation of India (DYFI).

== Speaker of Kerala Legislative Assembly ==
He was elected as the 24th Speaker of Kerala Legislative Assembly on 12 September 2022 after defeating Anwar Sadath on a margin of 96-40.

== Early life and education ==
A. N. Shamseer was born to Usman and Smt. A. N. Sareena in Kodiyeri, Thalassery, Kannur.

Shamseer did his schooling at the Basel Evangelical Mission Parsi High School, Thalassery, and subsequently completed his pre-degree from Government Brennen College, Thalassery. He then graduated in Law (BA; LL.B) from the School of Legal Studies, Department of Law, Kannur University. He also holds master's degrees in Law (LL.M) and Anthropology from Kannur University Campus.

== Political career ==
A. N. Shamseer entered into politics as a Students' Federation of India (SFI) activist during his school days. He was part of the leadership of SFI right from school to the all India level. He was elected as College Union General Secretary, Govt. Brennen College, Thalassery in 1995.

Shamseer was the first chairman of the Kannur University Union in 1998. He was the president, S.F.I. Kannur District Committee in 2003. He was elected as the state secretary of SFI in 2008 and All India Joint Secretary of S.F.I. Later he moved onto DYFI and became Kannur District President in 2012. Shamseer contested General Election to Loksabha in April 2014 as the CPI(M) candidate from Vatakara (Lok Sabha constituency) in Kerala but lost with a margin of 3306 votes. He was the president of the DYFI Kerala state committee between 2016 and 2018.

Kerala Legislative Assembly Election
Year	Constituency	Closest Rival	Majority (Votes)	Won/Lost
2016	Thalassery	A P Abdullakutty (INC)	34117	Won
2021	Thalassery	M. P. Aravindakshan (INC)	36801	Won

Parliament Election
Year	Constituency	Closest Rival	Majority (Votes)	Won/ Lost
2014	Vadakara	Mullappally Ramachandran (INC)	3306	Lost

== Controversies ==
- In April 2021, with the election code of conduct in place, there is a quick move to appoint his wife in violation of the rules. The complaint is that there is a move to appoint the MLA’s wife in Kannur University in violation of the rules. The interview is for the permanent post of Assistant Director at UGC HRD Centre.
- In January 2021, a complaint has been raised against Dr PM Shahala, wife of AN Shamseer MLA, regarding an illegal attempt to appoint her in Calicut University. The Save University campaign has complained to the governor about this. According to the complaint, Dr P Kelu, who was Shahala's research guide, has been appointed to the interview board to interview her.
- In August 2019, the Police investigation team probing the case of attempted murder of former CPM leader COT Nazeer, took a car used by MLA A N Shamseer into custody, following charges that it was in the Innova car the accused hatched the conspiracy to attack Nazeer.
- In July 2018, the Kannur University has used caste rotation as an excuse to appoint A. N. Shamseer MLA's wife Sahala Shamseer, as assistant professor on contract basis in the department of pedagogical sciences as assistant professor.
- In July 2017, A N Shamseer's photo being imprinted on calendars distributed in government schools in Thalassery, his constituency. The calendars also bear the caption "Nammude kunjungal thottadutha pothuvidhyalathilekku" (our kids to the near by public schools). The calendars were distributed as part of an educational project "Ellarum Schoolinu Oppam" led by the MLA in his constituency.
- In 2012, Shamseer issued threats against the police in a speech while he was DYFI's Kannur district president. He was tried in 2016, and sentenced to three months in prison and a ₹2000 fine for criminal intimidation.
- On 21 July 2023, A.N. Shamseer stated at a public function that the Indian federal government's education policy was trying to teach mythology to children instead of achievements in science and technology. He further said that lies were being told that infertility treatment, aircraft and plastic surgery all existed in the ancient Vedic period. "If one were to ask a question as to who invented the aircraft, my answer would be the Wright brothers which we learnt in school," he said. Shamseer said that efforts were being made to establish that the first aircraft was a pushpaka vimana. "The science is not ganapati and pushpaka vimana. Those are myths. The superstitions of the Hindutva era will push back progressive ideals." A controversy erupted following this when a leader of the Hindutva organization Yuva Morcha threatened to chop off Shamseer's hand. P. Jayarajan, a leader of Shamsheer's party the CPI(M), responded that if Yuva Morcha raised its hand against Shamsheer, its place would be in a mortuary. Other Hindutva organizations like the RSS, VHP, Hindu Aikyavedi and BJP claimed that Shamseer had insulted Hinduism by suggesting that Ganapati was a myth.
