= Thengamam Balakrishnan =

Indian politician and journalist

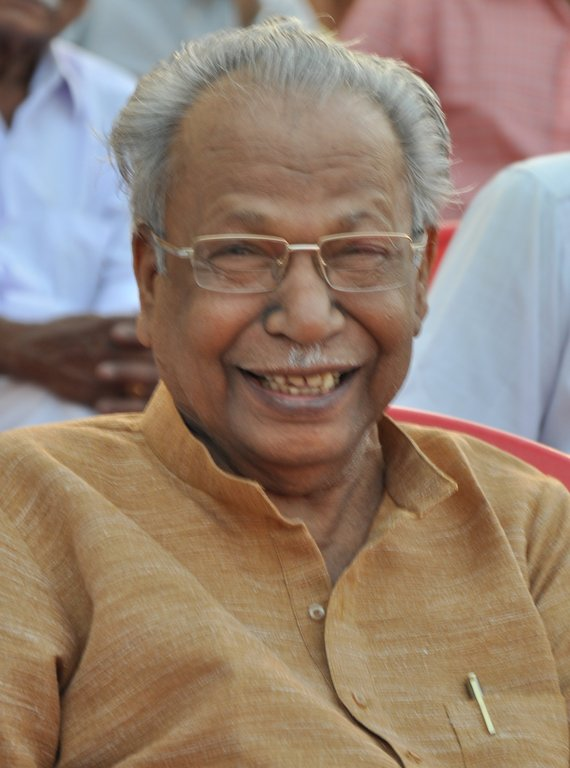

Member of the Kerala Legislative Assembly for Adoor
- In office 1970–1977
- Preceded by: Ramalingom
- Succeeded by: Thennala Balakrishna Pillai

Personal details
- Born: 1 April 1927 (age 99) Kollam, Kingdom of Travancore
- Died: 3 July 2013 (aged 86)
- Party: Communist Party of India
- Spouse: Nirmala
- Children: 1 Son, 2 Daughters
- Parents: Madhavan (father); Naniamma (mother)
- Profession: Journalist

Thengamam Balakrishnan (April 1, 1927 – July 3, 2013) was an Indian politician, journalist, and leader of Communist Party of India. He was former Chief editor of Janayugom. He represented Adoor constituency in the Kerala Legislative Assembly from 1970 to 1977.

== Biography ==
He was born as the eldest son of Madhavan and Naniamma of Thengamam on April 1, 1927. Influenced by the freedom movement and national leaders, Thengamam began his public life through All India Students Federation. Even during the student life, he was arrested and suffered police brutality for his public activism.

He had served as member of Kerala Public Service Commission, vice-president of Kerala Grandhasala Sangam and editor of Grandalokam.

Thengamam was married to Nirmala, they have two daughters and one son.

He died on July 3, 2013, at the age of 86.
