= Karayi Rajan =

Indian politician (born 1958)

Member of the Kerala Legislative Assembly
- Incumbent
- Assumed office May 2026
- Preceded by: A. N. Shamseer
- Constituency: Thalassery

Personal details
- Born: Karayi Rajan; 1958 (age 67–68) Kadirur, Kannur district, Kerala, India
- Party: Communist Party of India (Marxist)
- Occupation: Politician

Karayi Rajan (born 1958) is an Indian politician serving as the member of the legislative assembly (MLA) for the Thalassery constituency in the Kerala Legislative Assembly. A leader of the Communist Party of India (Marxist) (CPI(M)), he was elected in the 2026 Kerala Legislative Assembly election, succeeding A. N. Shamseer.

== Early life ==
Karayi Rajan was born in Kadirur, near Thalassery, in the Kannur district of Kerala.He has been involved in political activities in the Kannur region since his youth.

== Political career ==
Karayi Rajan is a leader of the CPI(M) in Kannur and has previously served as president of the Kannur District Panchayat. He served as Chairman of RUBCO, President of Kadirur Service Cooperative Bank, and Chairman of the Circle Sahakarana Union.also served as member of state cooperative union managing committee, member of housing board, senate member kannur university .chairman IV das media award committee, chairman VVK literature award committee, chairman ENarayanan memorial sahakarana award committee.

In the 2026 Kerala Assembly elections, he was nominated by the CPI(M) to contest from the Thalassery seat. He polled 69,743 votes and defeated his nearest rival, Saju K. P. of the Indian National Congress, by a margin of 20,523 votes.

== Election results ==
=== 2026 Kerala Legislative Assembly election ===
Party	Candidate	Votes	%	±%	
	CPI(M)	Karayi Rajan	69,743	48.01	-15.82
	INC	Saju K. P.	49,220	33.88	+7.91
	BJP	O. Nidheesh	22,754	15.66	+7.74
	SDPI	A. C. Jalaluddheen	1,444	0.99	-
Margin of victory		20,523	14.13		
Total valid votes		1,45,264			
CPI(M) hold		Swing	-11.87		
