= A. Nafeesath Beevi =

Indian politician

Deputy Speaker at Kerala Legislative Assembly
- In office 15 March 1960 – 10 September 1964
- Constituency: Alappuzha State Assembly constituency

Personal details
- Born: 22 March 1924
- Died: 11 May 2015 (aged 91)
- Party: Indian National Congress

Abdul Karim Nafeesath Beevi (1924-2015) was the Deputy Speaker of Kerala Legislative Assembly from 15 March 1960 to 10 September 1964.

She was born on 22 March 1924 to Abdul Karim and Hawa Umma. She did her education from Pope Pius XI High School at Bharanikkavu, Women's College, Thiruvananthapuram and SD College, Alappuzha. She secured her law degree from Law College, Ernakulam and enrolled as an advocate in 1953.

She married Abdulla Kutty and had one son and three daughters. At the age of 91, she left the world on 11 May 2015. She rests at Palayam Jumma Masjid, Trivandrum.

== Political life ==
The political life of A. Nafeesath Beevi can be traced from 1954 through Indian National Congress. She was quite active during the ‘Vimochana Samaram’ (liberation struggle) and was even imprisoned for being a part of the agitations. By being active in the organisational work of the Congress party, she rose to prominence in both Kerala Pradesh Congress Committee and All India Congress Committee. She was an advocate by profession and has dedicated around six decades for full time congress politics. She was actively involved in organizing various cooperative societies and women's associations.

In the Second Kerala Legislative Assembly, which began on February 22, 1960, Kerala made history by electing K.M.Seethi Sahib of IUML as the speaker and A. Nafeesath Beevi of Indian National Congress as the deputy speaker of the house. For the first time, two Muslims from two different parties came to control the house. Nafeesath Beevi got elected to the assembly from Alappuzha State Assembly constituency in 1960. She had also served as a Member of the Kerala State Women's Commission. She had failed attempts to enter Lok Sabha from Kerala.
