= Adoor Assembly constituency =

Constituency of the Kerala legislative assembly in India

Coordinates: 9.16°N 76.73°E

Adoor
- Constituency No. 115 for the Kerala Legislative Assembly
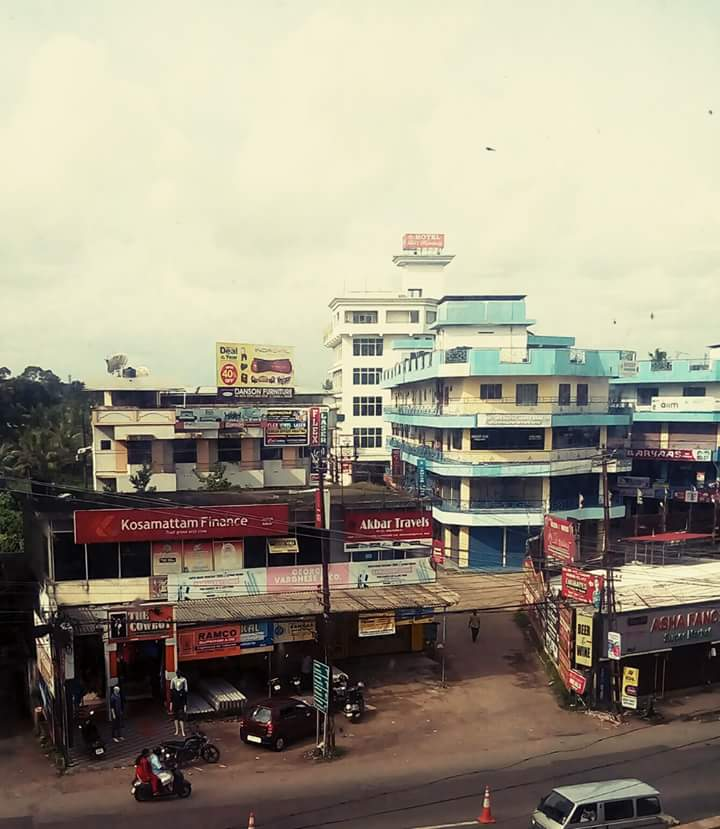
- Adoor Central Junction

Constituency details
- Country: India
- Region: South India
- State: Kerala
- District: Pathanamthitta
- Established: 1965
- Total electors: 208,099 (2021)
- Reservation: SC

Member of Legislative Assembly
- 16th Kerala Legislative Assembly
- Incumbent C. V. Santhakumar
- Party: Indian National Congress
- Elected year: 2026

Adoor State assembly constituency is one of the 140 state legislative assembly constituencies representing Adoor in Pathanamthitta district of Kerala in India. It is also one of the seven state legislative assembly constituencies included in Pathanamthitta Lok Sabha constituency. The current MLA is C. V. Santhakumar of INC.

== Local self-governed segments ==
Adoor Assembly constituency is composed of the following local self-governed segments:

| Name | Status (Grama panchayat/Municipality) | Taluk |
|---|---|---|
| Adoor | Municipality | Adoor |
| Pandalam | Municipality | Adoor |
| Pandalam Thekkekara | Grama panchayat | Adoor |
| Kodumon | Grama panchayat | Adoor |
| Ezhamkulam | Grama panchayat | Adoor |
| Erathu | Grama panchayat | Adoor |
| Pallickal | Grama panchayat | Adoor |
| Kadampanad | Grama panchayat | Adoor |
| Thumpamon | Grama panchayat | Adoor |

== Members of the Legislative Assembly ==
The following list contains all members of the Kerala Legislative Assembly who have represented the constituency:

Key

CPI INC CPI(M)

| Election | Niyama Sabha | Member | Party | Tenure |
|---|---|---|---|---|
| 1967 | 3rd | P. Ramalingom | Communist Party of India | 1967 – 1970 |
| 1970 | 4th | Thengamam Balakrishnan | Communist Party of India | 1970 – 1977 |
| 1977 | 5th | Thennala Balakrishna Pillai | Indian National Congress | 1977 – 1980 |
| 1980 | 6th | C. P. Karunakaran Pillai | Communist Party of India | 1980 – 1982 |
| 1982 | 7th | Thennala Balakrishna Pillai | Indian National Congress | 1982 – 1987 |
| 1987 | 8th | R. Unnikrishnan Pillai | Communist Party of India | 1987 – 1991 |
| 1991 | 9th | Thiruvanchoor Radhakrishnan | Indian National Congress | 1991 – 1996 |
| 1996 | 10th | Thiruvanchoor Radhakrishnan | Indian National Congress | 1996 – 2001 |
| 2001 | 11th | Thiruvanchoor Radhakrishnan | Indian National Congress | 2001 – 2006 |
| 2006 | 12th | Thiruvanchoor Radhakrishnan | Indian National Congress | 2006 – 2011 |
| 2011 | 13th | Chittayam Gopakumar | Communist Party of India | 2011 – 2016 |
| 2016 | 14th | Chittayam Gopakumar | Communist Party of India | 2016 - 2021 |
| 2021 | 15th | Chittayam Gopakumar | Communist Party of India | 2021-2026 |
| 2026 | 16th | C. V. Santhakumar | Indian National Congress | Incumbent |

== Election results ==
Percentage change (±%) denotes the change in the number of votes from the immediate previous election.

=== 2026 ===
2026 Kerala Legislative Assembly election: Adoor
| Party | Candidate | Votes | % | ±% |
|---|---|---|---|---|
| INC | C. V. Santhakumar | 66,153 | 44.2 | |
| CPI | Priji Kannan | 55,821 | 37.3 | |
| BJP | Adv. Pandalam Prathapan | 26,337 | 17.6 | |
| NOTA | None of the above | 783 | 0.52 | |
| Margin of victory | | 10,332 | | |
| Turnout | | 1,49,670 | | |
| INC gain from CPI | | Swing | Gain | |

=== 2021 ===
There were 2,08,099 registered voters in the constituency for the 2021 Kerala Niyamasabha Election.

2021 Kerala Legislative Assembly election: Adoor
| Party | Candidate | Votes | % | ±% |
|---|---|---|---|---|
| CPI | Chittayam Gopakumar | 66,569 | 42.83% | ▼6.22 |
| INC | M. G. Kannan | 63,650 | 40.96% | ▲8.34 |
| BJP | Adv. Pandalam Prathapan | 23,980 | 15.43% | ▼1.30 |
| NOTA | None of the above | 594 | 0.38% | ▼0.05 |
| Independent | R. Kannan S/o Rajan | 218 | 0.14% | N/A |
| BSP | Vipin Kanikonathu | 178 | 0.11% | ▼0.15 |
| SUCI(C) | Saranya Raj | 127 | 0.08% | N/A |
| Anna DHRM | Rajan Kulakkada | 95 | 0.06% | N/A |
| Margin of victory | | 2,919 | 1.87% | ▼14.56 |
| Turnout | | 1,55,411 | 74.68% | ▲0.31 |
| CPI hold | | Swing | ▼6.22 | |

=== 2016 ===
There were 2,08,432 registered voters in the constituency for the 2016 Kerala Niyamasabha Election.

2016 Kerala Legislative Assembly election: Adoor
| Party | Candidate | Votes | % | ±% |
|---|---|---|---|---|
| CPI | Chittayam Gopakumar | 76,034 | 49.05 | ▲2.03 |
| INC | K. K. Shaju | 50,574 | 32.62 | ▼13.95 |
| BJP | P. Sudheer | 25,940 | 16.73 | ▲12.13 |
| SDPI | Jyothish Perumpulickal | 673 | 0.43 | |
| NOTA | None of the above | 672 | 0.43 | − |
| BSP | Plavinal Santhosh | 410 | 0.26 | ▼0.12 |
| Independent | Ajitha P. | 408 | 0.26 | |
| PDP | Vishnu Raj T. | 307 | 0.20 | |
| Margin of victory | | 25,460 | 16.43 | ▲15.98 |
| Turnout | | 1,55,018 | 74.37 | ▲4.76 |
| CPI hold | | Swing | ▲2.03 | |

=== 2011 ===
There were 1,94,014 registered voters in the constituency for the 2011 election.

2011 Kerala Legislative Assembly election: Adoor
| Party | Candidate | Votes | % | ±% |
|---|---|---|---|---|
| CPI | Chittayam Gopakumar | 63,501 | 47.02 | ▲9.88 |
| INC | Pandalam Sudhakaran | 62,894 | 46.57 | ▼10.19 |
| BJP | K. K. Sasi | 6,210 | 4.60 | ▲0.41 |
| Independent | Olikkulangara Surendran | 994 | 0.74 | |
| BSP | Kodumon Ramachandran | 519 | 0.38 | ▼0.29 |
| Independent | Piravanthoor Sreedharan | 462 | 0.34 | |
| Independent | Remanan | 315 | 0.23 | |
| Independent | Anil K. | 162 | 0.12 | |
| Margin of victory | | 607 | 0.45 | ▼19.17 |
| Turnout | | 1,35,057 | 69.61 | ▼3.64 |
| CPI gain from INC | | Swing | ▲9.88 | |

=== 2006 ===
There were 1,28,472 registered voters in the constituency for the 2006 election.

2006 Kerala Legislative Assembly election: Adoor
| Party | Candidate | Votes | % | ±% |
|---|---|---|---|---|
| INC | Thiruvanchoor Radhakrishnan | 53,416 | 56.76 | ▲1.98 |
| KEC | Prof. D. K. John | 34,952 | 37.14 | ▼1.80 |
| BJP | T. R. Ajith Kumar | 3,943 | 4.19 | ▼0.62 |
| Independent | Meenathepura Radhakrishnan | 898 | 0.95 | − |
| BSP | M. S. Babu | 632 | 0.67 | − |
| Independent | S. V. John | 262 | 0.28 | − |
| Rejected | Rejected & Missing Votes | 4 | | |
| Margin of victory | | 18,464 | 19.62 | ▲3.78 |
| Turnout | | 94,107 | 73.25 | ▼3.81 |
| INC hold | | Swing | ▲1.98 | |

=== 2001 ===
There were 1,25,660 registered voters in the constituency for the 2001 election.

2001 Kerala Legislative Assembly election: Adoor
| Party | Candidate | Votes | % | ±% |
|---|---|---|---|---|
| INC | Thiruvanchoor Radhakrishnan | 53,034 | 54.78 | |
| CPI(M) | Pallickal Prasannakumar | 37,694 | 38.94 | |
| BJP | Dr. Kulangara G. Ramachandran Nair | 4,655 | 4.81 | |
| Independent | Prasannakumar | 855 | 0.88 | |
| Independent | Radhakrishnan | 571 | 0.59 | |
| Rejected | Rejected & Missing Votes | 22 | | |
| Margin of victory | | 15,340 | 15.84 | |
| Turnout | | 96,831 | 77.06 | |
| INC hold | | Swing | | |
