= Thalassery Assembly constituency =

Constituency of the Kerala legislative assembly in India

Coordinates: 11°45′55.28″N 75°27′32.84″E

Thalassery
- Constituency No. 13 for the Kerala Legislative Assembly
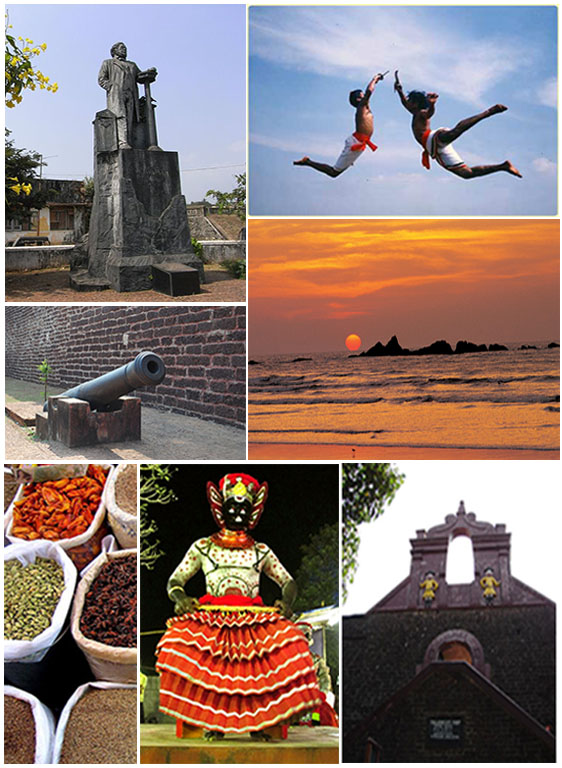
- Clockwise from top: Hermann Gundert Statue, Kalaripayattu Training, Muzhappilangad Beach, Thalassery fort, Theyyam, Spice Market, Cannons near Pier

Constituency details
- Country: India
- Region: South India
- State: Kerala
- District: Kannur
- Established: 1951
- Total electors: 185,841 (2026)
- Reservation: None

Member of Legislative Assembly
- 16th Kerala Legislative Assembly
- Incumbent Karayi Rajan
- Party: CPI(M)
- Alliance: LDF
- Elected year: 2026

Thalassery State assembly constituency is one of the 140 state legislative assembly constituencies in Kerala. It is also one of the seven state legislative assembly constituencies included in Vatakara Lok Sabha constituency. As of the 2026 Assembly elections, the MLA is Karayi Rajan of CPI(M).

== Local self-governed segments ==
Thalassery Assembly constituency is composed of the following local self-governed segments:

Sl no.	Name	Status (Grama panchayat/Municipality)	Taluk
1	Thalassery	Municipality	Thalassery
2	Chokli	Grama panchayat	Thalassery
3	Eranholi	Grama panchayat	Thalassery
4	Kadirur	Grama panchayat	Thalassery
5	New Mahe	Grama panchayat	Thalassery
6	Panniyannur	Grama panchayat	Thalassery

== Members of Legislative Assembly ==
The following list contains all members of Kerala Legislative Assembly who have represented Thalassery Assembly constituency during the period of various assemblies:

Key

CPI CPI(M)

Election	Niyama Sabha	Member	Party	Tenure
1957	1st	V. R. Krishna Iyer	CPI	1957 – 1960
1960	2nd	V. R. Krishna Iyer	CPI	1960 – 1965
1967	3rd	K. P. R. Gopalan	CPI(M)	1967 – 1970
1970	4th	N. E. Balaram	CPI	1970 – 1977
1977	5th	Pattiam Gopalan	CPI(M)	1977 – 1980
1979*	5th	M. V. Rajagopalan	CPI(M)	1979 – 1980
1980	6th	M. V. Rajagopalan	CPI(M)	1980 – 1982
1982	7th	Kodiyeri Balakrishnan	CPI(M)	1982 – 1987
1987	8th	Kodiyeri Balakrishnan	CPI(M)	1987 – 1991
1991	9th	K. P. Mammoo Master	CPI(M)	1991 – 1996
1996	10th	E. K. Nayanar	CPI(M)	1996 – 2001
2001	11th	Kodiyeri Balakrishnan	CPI(M)	2001 – 2006
2006	12th	Kodiyeri Balakrishnan	CPI(M)	2006 – 2011
2011	13th	Kodiyeri Balakrishnan	CPI(M)	2011 – 2016
2016	14th	A. N. Shamseer	CPI(M)	2016 - 2021
2021	15th	A. N. Shamseer	CPI(M)	2021-2026
2026	14th	Karayi Rajan	CPI(M)	2026-

*by-election

== Election results ==
=== 2026 ===
There were 185,841 registered voters in the Thalassery Assembly constituency for the 2026 Kerala Assembly elections.

2026 Kerala Legislative Assembly election: Thalassery
Party	Candidate	Votes	%	±%
CPI(M)	Karayi Rajan	69,743	48.34	▼13.18
INC	K. P. Saju	49,220	34.11	▲0.27
BJP	O. Nidheesh	22,754	15.77	
SDPI	A. C. Jalaluddheen	1,444	1.00	
NOTA	None of the above	728	0.50	▼1.23
Independent	Saju V. P.	240	0.17	
Independent	Rajan O. P.	89	0.06	
Independent	Rajan V. P.	69	0.05	
Margin of victory		20,523	14.23	▼13.45
Turnout		1,44,287		
CPI(M) hold		Swing	▼13.18	

Local Body	Booths	UDF Votes	LDF Votes	NDA/BJP Votes	Leader	Lead
Eranholi	25	4935	10004	3455	LDF	5069
Kadirur	32	7550	13548	3506	LDF	5998
Thalassery Municipality	72	17939	21931	10767	LDF	3992
Panniyannur	19	5360	8497	1636	LDF	3137
New Mahe	15	4699	4506	1133	UDF	193
Chokli	26	7980	9915	1951	LDF	1935
TOTAL	189	48463	68401	22448	LDF	19938

=== 2021 ===
There were 1,75,143 registered voters in the constituency for the 2021 election.

2021 Kerala Legislative Assembly election: Thalassery
Party	Candidate	Votes	%	±%
CPI(M)	A. N. Shamseer	81,810	61.52	▲8.20
INC	M. P. Aravindakshan	45,009	33.84	▲6.23
NOTA	None of the above	2,313	1.73	−
WPOI	Shamseer Ibrahim	1,963	1.48	▲0.47
Independent	C. O. T. Naseer	1,163	0.87	−
Independent	Aravindakshan	533	0.40	−
Independent	Haridasan	198	0.15	−
Margin of victory		36,801	27.68	▲1.97
Turnout		1,32,989	75.93	▼3.5
CPI(M) hold		Swing	▲8.20	

=== 2016 ===
There were 1,67,024 registered voters in the constituency for the 2016 election.

2016 Kerala Legislative Assembly election: Thalassery
Party	Candidate	Votes	%	±%
CPI(M)	A. N. Shamseer	70,741	53.32	▼3.46
INC	A. P. Abdullakutty	36,624	27.61	▼6.66
BJP	V. K. Sajeevan	22,125	16.68	▲10.76
WPOI	Jabeena Irshad	1,337	1.01	−
SDPI	A. C. Jalaludeen	959	0.72	▼1.04
NOTA	None of the above	514	0.39	−
Independent	Balakrishnan Kodiyeri	129	0.10	−
Independent	Thayyil Vattakkandi Sajeeevan V. K	125	0.09	−
Independent	Danish Mahal A. P. Abdullakutty	112	0.08	−
Margin of victory		34,117	25.71	▲3.20
Turnout		1,32,666	79.43	▲0.76
CPI(M) hold		Swing	▼3.46	

=== 2011 ===
There were 1,49,689 registered voters in the constituency for the 2011 election.

2011 Kerala Legislative Assembly election: Thalassery
Party	Candidate	Votes	%	±%
CPI(M)	Kodiyeri Balakrishnan	66,870	56.78	
INC	Rijil Makkutty	40,361	34.27	
BJP	V. Ratnakaran	6,973	5.92	
SDPI	A. C. Jalaluddin	2,068	1.76	
BSP	K. Raghunath	674	0.57	
Independent	Rijil Muliyil	539	0.46	
Independent	Balakrishnan	278	0.24	
Margin of victory		26,509	22.51	
Turnout		1,17,763	78.67	
CPI(M) hold		Swing		

=== 1952 ===
1952 Madras Legislative Assembly election: Thalassery
Party	Candidate	Votes	%	±%
CPI	C. H. Kanaran	20,836	46.11%	
INC	Raghavan Nair. K. P	10,135	22.43%	22.43%
Independent	Koyamu Khan Saheb Ollyatg Vazhayil	8,965	19.84%	
Socialist	Amina Hashim	5,254	11.63%	
Margin of victory		10,701	23.68%	
Turnout		45,190	71.04%	
Registered electors		63,608		
CPI win (new seat)				

== See also ==
- Thalassery
- Kannur district
- List of constituencies of the Kerala Legislative Assembly
- 2016 Kerala Legislative Assembly election
