= V. K. Sanoj =

Indian politician

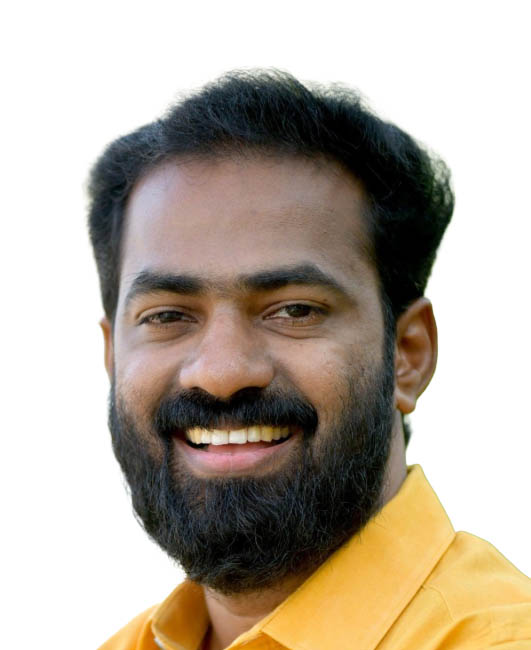

Member of the Kerala Legislative Assembly
- Incumbent
- Assumed office May 2026
- Preceded by: K. K. Shailaja
- Constituency: Mattannur

Personal details
- Born: V. K. Sanoj; 1983 (age 42–43) Kuthuparamba, Kannur district, Kerala, India
- Party: Communist Party of India (Marxist)
- Spouse(s): Jasna Jayaraj (Senior Sub Editor, Deshabhimani)
- Parent: Padmanabhan M. (father)
- Education: Graduate
- Occupation: Politician, Social Worker

V. K. Sanoj (born 1983) is an Indian politician serving as the member of the legislative assembly (MLA) for the Mattannur constituency. A leader of the Communist Party of India (Marxist), he was the former state secretary of the Democratic Youth Federation of India (DYFI) Kerala State Committee.

== Personal life ==
V. K. Sanoj was born to Padmanabhan M. and is a resident of Kuthuparamba in Kannur district. He is married; his spouse works as a Senior Sub Editor at Deshabhimani in Kannur.

== Political career ==
Sanoj rose through the ranks of the Student Federation of India (SFI) and later became a prominent leader of the DYFI. In the 2026 Kerala Legislative Assembly election, he was selected by the CPI(M) to contest from the Mattannur seat, a major party stronghold previously represented by former health minister K. K. Shailaja.

== Election results ==
2026 Kerala Legislative Assembly election: Mattannur
Party	Candidate	Votes	%	±%
CPI(M)	V. K. Sanoj	81,456	52.61	-18.36
INC	Chandran Thillankeri	67,288	43.46	+19.38
BJP	Biju Elakkuzhi	17,815	11.51	+4.10
Margin of victory		14,168	9.15	
Total valid votes		1,54,821		
