= T. J. Saneesh Kumar Joseph =

Indian politician

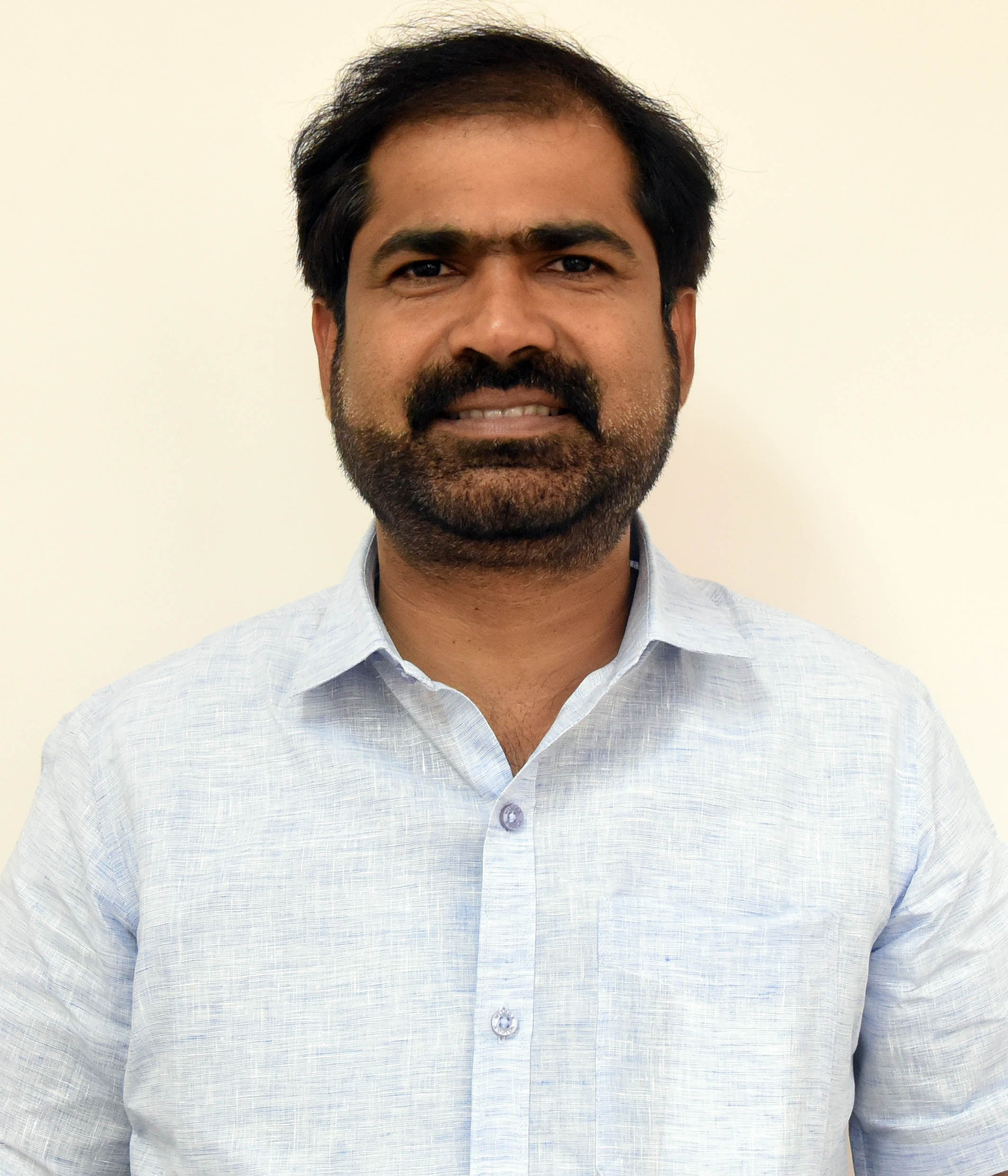

Previous Member of Kerala Legislative Assembly
- Incumbent
- Assumed office 2021
- Preceded by: B. D. Devassy
- Constituency: Chalakudy

Personal details
- Born: India
- Party: Indian National Congress

T. J. Saneesh Kumar Joseph is an Indian politician from Kerala. He is a two time member of the Kerala Legislative Assembly elected from Chalakudy Assembly constituency representing the Indian National Congress.

== Early life and education ==
Joseph is from Puthukkad, Thrissur district, Kerala. He is the son of Joseph. He completed his B.Sc in Mathematics at St. Thomas College, Thrissur in 1998. He is a farmer and his wife is a nurse. He declared assets worth Rs.2 crore in his affidavit to the Election Commission of India.

== Career ==
Joseph won the Chalakudy Assembly constituency representing the Indian National Congress in the 2026 Kerala Legislative Assembly election. He polled 71,202 votes and defeated his nearest rival, Biju S Chirayath of the Kerala Congress (M), by a margin of 23,156 votes.
