= Kerala Democratic Party =

- Abbreviation: KDP
- President: K. J. Josemon
- Founder: Mani C. Kappan
- Founded: 22 February 2021; 5 years ago
- Split from: NCP
- Ideology: Liberalism
- Political position: Centre
- Colours: Pacific Blue
- Alliance: UDF (Kerala)
- Seats in Kerala Legislative Assembly: 1 / 140
- Number of states and union territories in government: 1 / 31

Party flag
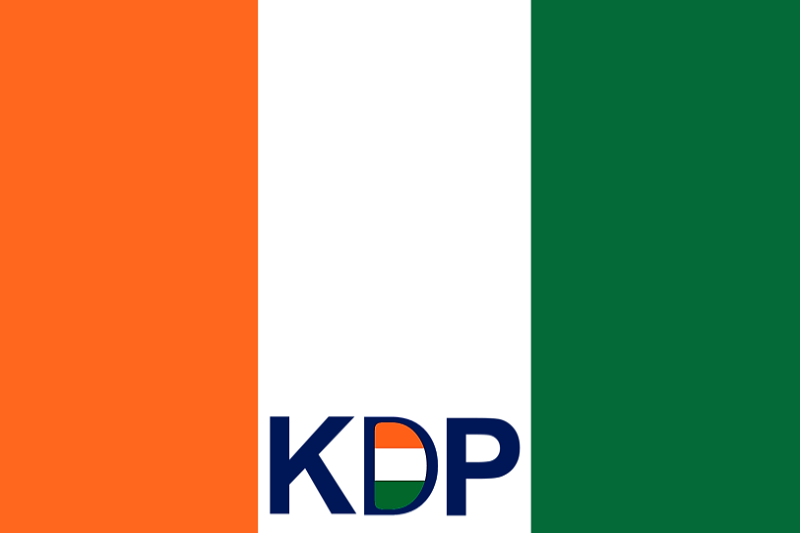

Kerala Democratic Party formerly called Nationalist Congress Kerala or Democratic Congress Kerala, is a political party in Kerala, India, formed after the split in Nationalist Congress Party in Kerala. The party is led by Mani C. Kappan.

== Formation ==
Mani C. Kappan and his Nationalist Congress Party were part of the ruling Left Democratic Front alliance in Kerala. After rumours that the LDF was planning to give Kappan's sitting seat to Kerala Congress (M), Kappan decided to leave the alliance. He initially claimed that he had the support of the party leadership and the party was planning to leave LDF and join the United Democratic Front. However, the party's state and national leadership decided to continue with the LDF and hence Kappan decided to float a new party in 2021 February.

== Electoral Victory ==
Mani C. Kappan, the Nationalist Congress Kerala (now called Kerala Democratic Party) candidate in the Pala constituency won against Jose K Mani, of the Kerala Congress (M) with a margin of 2,990 votes in 2026 Legislative Assembly Elections.

== Electoral performance ==
Kerala Legislative Assembly election results
Election Year	Alliance	Seats contested	Seats won	Total Votes	Percentage of votes	+/- Vote
2021	UDF	2	1 / 140	69,804	0.33%	New
2026	UDF	1	1 / 140			
