= C. V. Santhakumar =

Indian politician (born 1980)

Member of the Kerala Legislative Assembly
- Incumbent
- Assumed office 2026
- Preceded by: Mathew T. Thomas
- Constituency: Adoor Assembly constituency

Personal details
- Born: 1980 (age 45–46) Konni, Pathanamthitta district, Kerala, India
- Party: Indian National Congress
- Parent: Vasu (father)
- Education: Government Law College, Thrissur
- Occupation: Politician; Advocate

C. Vasu Santhakumar (born 1980) is an Indian politician from Kerala. He is a member of the Kerala Legislative Assembly from the Adoor Assembly constituency in Pathanamthitta district representing the Indian National Congress.

== Early life ==
Santhakumar is from Konni, Pathanamthitta district, Kerala. He is the son of Vasu. He completed BA at a college affiliated with University of Calicut In 2015, and five year BA (Law) and an LL.B Degree at Government Law College, Thrissur. He is an advocate and his wife is an Overseer, Grade III LSGD, Government of Keralam. He declared assets worth Rs.72 lakhs in his affidavit with the Election Commission of India.

== Career ==
Santhakumar won the Adoor Assembly constituency representing the Indian National Congress in the 2026 Kerala Legislative Assembly election. He polled 66,153 votes and defeated his nearest rival, Priji Kannan of the Communist Party of India, by a margin of 10,332 votes.
