= Thiruvanchoor Radhakrishnan =

Indian politician (born 1949)

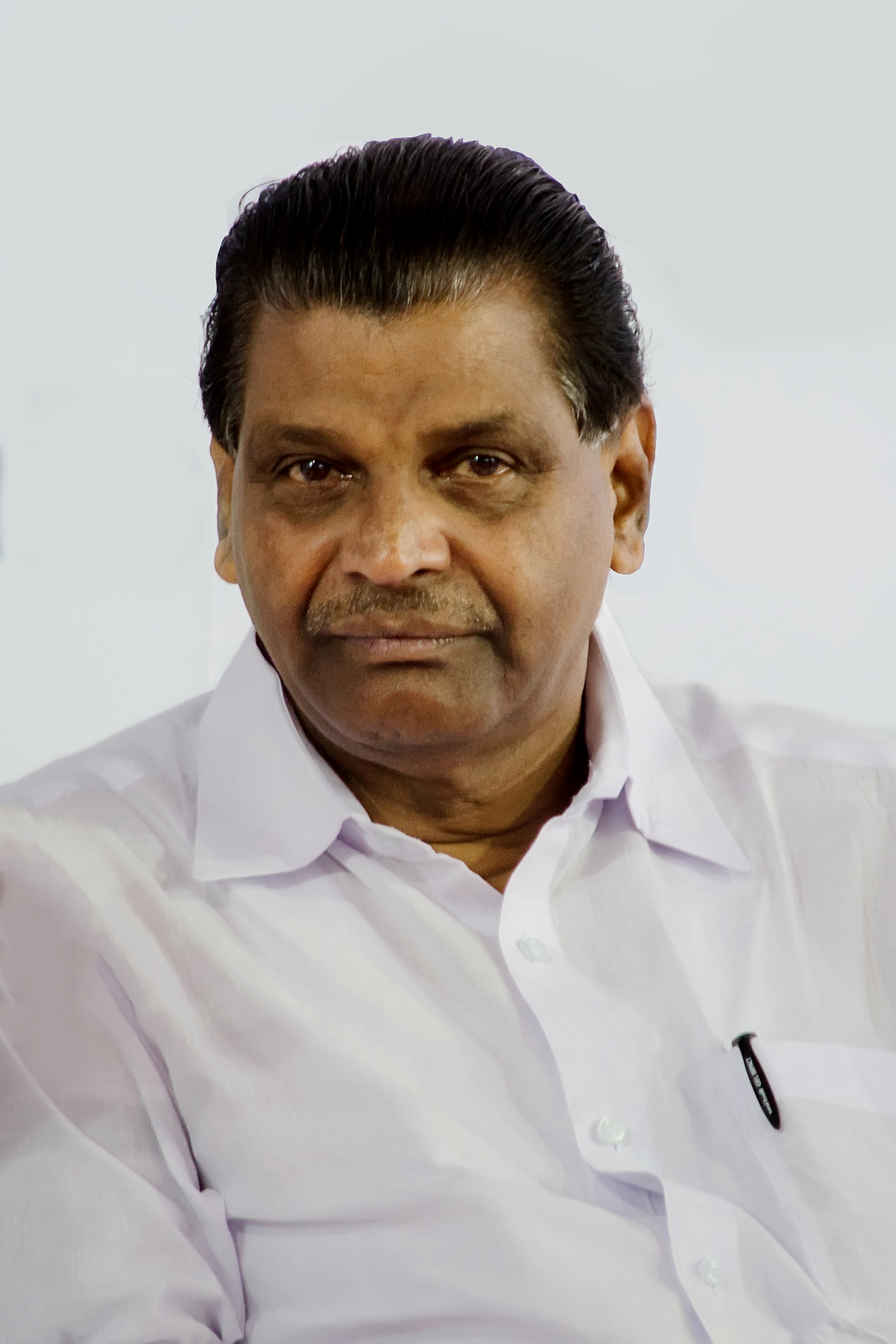

Speaker of the Kerala Legislative Assembly
- Incumbent
- Assumed office 22 May 2026
- Deputy speaker: Shanimol Osman
- Preceded by: A. N. Shamseer

Minister for Forests, Environment, Transport, Sports and Cinema, Government of Kerala
- In office 1 January 2014 – 20 May 2016
- Chief minister: Oommen Chandy
- Preceded by: Aryadan Muhammed (Transport)
- Succeeded by: K. Raju (Forest); A. K. Saseendran (Transport); A. K. Balan (Cinema)

Minister for Home and Vigilance Government of Kerala
- In office 12 April 2012 – 31 December 2013
- Chief minister: Oommen Chandy
- Preceded by: Oommen Chandy
- Succeeded by: Ramesh Chennithala

Minister for Revenue, Government of Kerala
- In office 23 May 2011 – 11 April 2012
- Preceded by: K. P. Rajendran
- Succeeded by: Adoor Prakash

Member of Kerala Legislative Assembly
- In office 1991 – 2011
- Preceded by: R. Unnikrishna Pillai
- Succeeded by: Chittayam Gopakumar
- Constituency: Adoor

Member of Kerala Legislative Assembly
- Incumbent
- Assumed office 1 June 2011
- Preceded by: V. N. Vasavan
- Constituency: Kottayam

Personal details
- Born: 26 December 1949 (age 76) Thiruvanchoor, Kottayam, Kerala, India
- Party: Indian National Congress
- Spouse: Lalithambika Radhakrishnan
- Children: 3
- Parents: K. P. Parameswaran Pillai; M. G. Gourikutty Amma
- Education: Government Law College, Thiruvananthapuram

Thiruvanchoor Radhakrishnan (born 26 December 1949) is an Indian politician and lawyer from the state of Kerala who is currently the Speaker of the Kerala Legislative Assembly. From 13 April 2012 to 1 January 2014, he was the Home Minister in Oommen Chandy Ministry, Government of Kerala. He simultaneously held the Vigilance portfolio for the same time period and subsequently took over Forest, Transport, Sports, Cinema & Environment portfolios for the remaining duration of the ministry.

== Personal life ==
Thiruvanchoor Radhakrishnan was born to K. P. Parameswaran Pillai and M. G. Gourikutty Amma on 26 December 1949 at Thiruvanchoor in the erstwhile United State of Travancore and Cochin. He completed a Bachelor of Law (LL.B) degree from Government Law College, Thiruvananthapuram and worked as an advocate in Kottayam bar.

He married Lalithambika. They have two sons, Dr. Anupam Radhakrishnan and Arjun Radhakrishnan; and a daughter, Athira Radhakrishnan.

== Political life ==
Thiruvanchoor entered public service as a student activist, through Balajanasakhyam, KSU and Youth Congress, rising to become the leader of various youth organizations. He held many important positions within KSU, Youth Congress and KPCC, including:

- President, All Kerala Balajanasakhyam (1965)
- Chairman, Baselias College Union and General Secretary (1967)
- KSU State General secretary (1967)
- KSU State President (1967)
- Youth Congress State President (1978)
- KPCC General Secretary (1984-2001)
- Opposition Chief Whip (12th Kerala Assembly)

He contested the 1987 Kerala Legislative Assembly election from Kottayam assembly, and he lost to T.K Ramakrishnan of CPI(M).

He was elected to Kerala Legislative Assembly in 1991, 1996, 2001 and 2006 from Adoor and currently represents Kottayam constituency. He also served as the General Secretary of the Kerala Pradesh Congress Committee (I).

Major election victories
Year	Constituency	Closest rival	Majority (votes)
1991	Adoor	R. Unnikrishna Pillai (CPI(M))	5,767
1996	Adoor	K. N. Balagopal (CPI(M))	9,201
2001	Adoor	Kadamminitta Ramakrishnan (LDF-IND)	14,050
2006	Adoor	D. K. John (Kerala Congress)	18,464
2011	Kottayam	V. N. Vasavan (CPI(M))	711
2016	Kottayam	Reji Sakharia (CPI(M))	33,632
2021	Kottayam	K. Anilkumar (CPI(M))	18,743
2026	Kottayam	K. Anilkumar (CPI(M))	35,986

== Administrative roles ==
UDF Government 2004–2006:

- Minister of Irrigation & Water Resources (2004–2006)
- Minister of Parliamentary Affairs (2004–2006)
- Minister of Forest-Wildlife Protection (March 2005 to January 2006)
- Minister of Health (January to June 2006 )

UDF Government 2011–2016:

- Minister of Revenue (18 May 2011 – 13 April 2012)
- Minister of Home, Vigilance, Fire and rescue (13 April 2012 – 31 December 2013)
- Minister for Forests, Sports, Cinema, Road Transport, Environment (1 January 2014 – 12 May 2016)
