= Anwar Sadath =

Indian politician (born 1975)

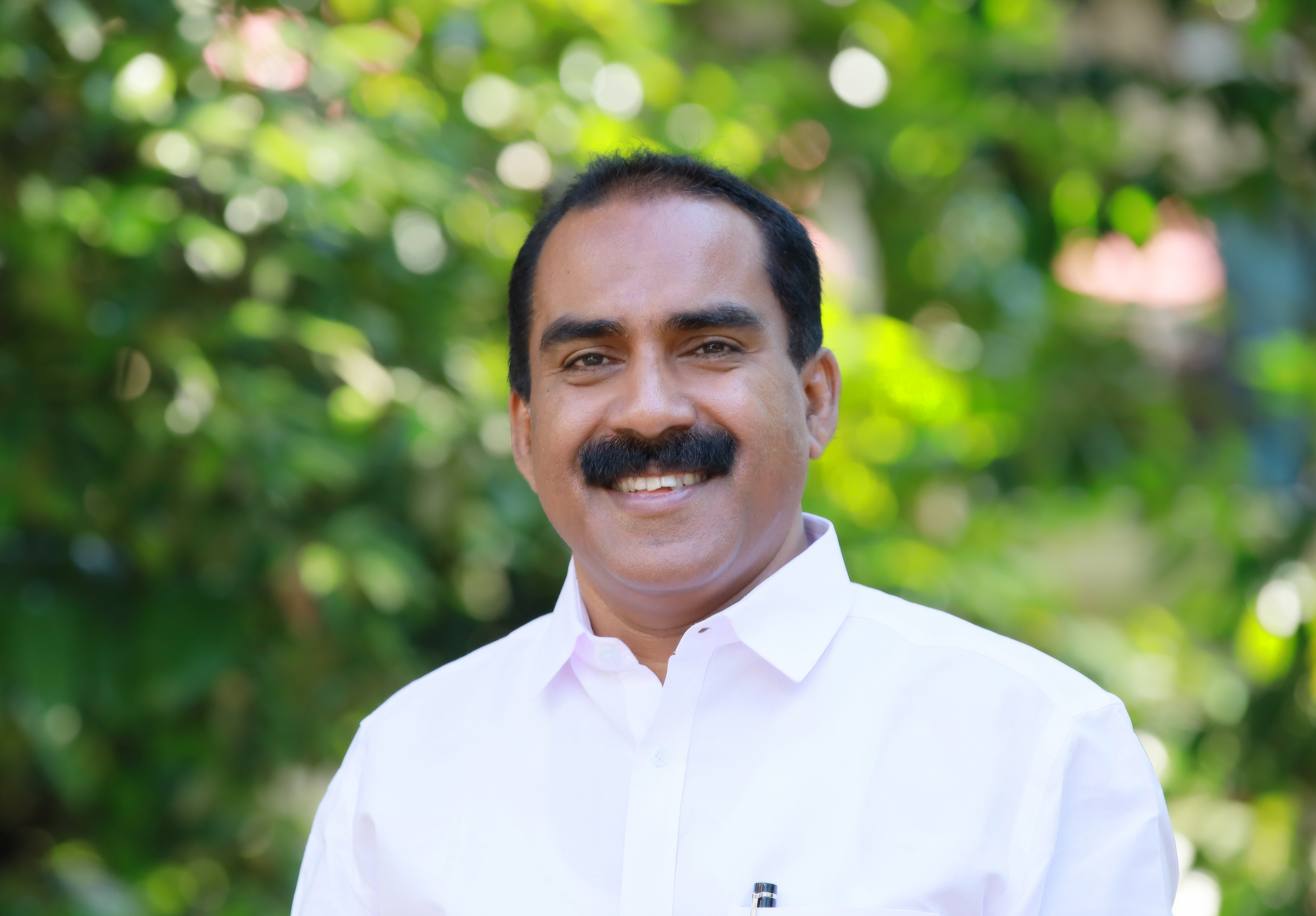
- Sadath in January 2021

Member of the Kerala Legislative Assembly

Chief Whip UDF
- In office 2011–present
- Preceded by: A. M. Yousaf
- Constituency: Aluva

Personal details
- Born: 18 February 1975 (age 51) Aluva, Kerala
- Party: Indian National Congress
- Spouse: Sabeena Sadath
- Children: 2
- Parents: Abdhul Sattar (father); Ayesha Beevi (mother)
- Occupation: Politician
- Website: Anwar Sadath

Anwar Sadath (born 18 February 1975) is an Indian politician and a member of the 15th Kerala Legislative Assembly. He is affiliated with the Indian National Congress and represents Aluva Constituency.

== Early life ==
Anwar Sadath was born on 18 February 1975 as the son of Shri. Abdul Sathar and Smt. Aisha Beevi. He was School Unit President, Kerala Student Union (KSU) and School Leader. He progressed to become the District Level; Taluk Secretary and District Executive Committee Member of KSU and later on he became the Block Secretary, District Secretary and State Secretary of Youth Congress. He also became a Member of the Chengamanad Grama Panchayat and Zilla Panchayat, Nedumbassery Division.

== Political career ==
In the 2011 assembly election, he defeated AM Yusuf of the CPI (M). In the 2016 Kerala Assembly election he defeated Advocate V. Salim by 18835 votes and was re-elected as an MLA. In 2021, Anwar Sadath has won from Aluva, defeating Ar Shelna Nishad, and is the Chief Whip of UDF (opposition party) 15th Kerala Legislative Assembly.
