= Kerala Legislative Assembly =

Unicameral state legislature of Kerala, India

- 16th Kerala Assembly

Type
- Type: Unicameral
- Term limits: 5 years

History
- Founded: 27 April 1957 (69 years ago)

Leadership
- Speaker: Thiruvanchoor Radhakrishnan, INC since 22 May 2026
- Deputy Speaker: Shanimol Osman, INC since 02 June 2026
- Leader of the House (Chief Minister): V. D. Satheesan, INC since 18 May 2026
- Leader of the Opposition: Pinarayi Vijayan, CPI(M) since 18 May 2026
- Legislature Secretary: Shaji C Baby

Structure
- Seats: 140
- Political groups: Government (102) UDF (102): INC (63); IUML (22); KEC (7); RSP (3); KC(J) (1); CMP (1); RMPI (1); KDP (1); IND (4); Opposition (38) LDF (35): CPI(M) (26); CPI (8); RJD (1); NDA (3): BJP (3)

Elections
- Voting system: First past the post
- Last election: 9 April 2026
- Next election: 2031

Meeting place
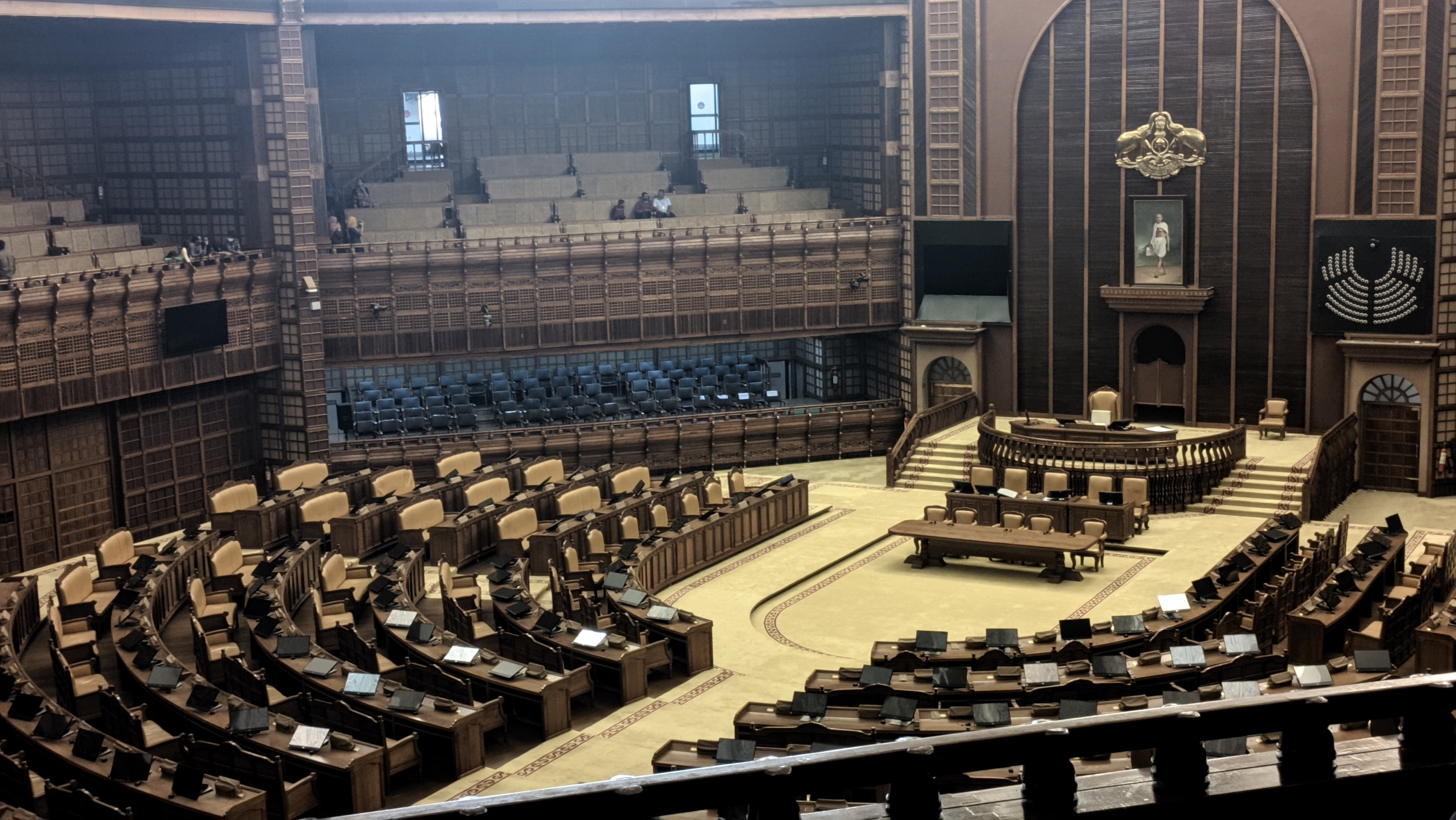
- Niyamasabha Mandiram, Thiruvananthapuram, Kerala

Website
- www.niyamasabha.org

The Kerala Legislative Assembly, or Kerala Niyamasabha, is the State Assembly of Kerala, one of the 28 states in India. Following the 2026 Kerala Legislative Assembly election, the Assembly is formed by 140 elected representatives, one from each of the 140 constituencies within the borders of Kerala, referred to as Member of the Legislative Assembly (MLA).

== History ==
In 1956, the State of Kerala was formed on linguistic basis, merging Travancore, Cochin and Malabar regions, and the Kasaragod region of South Canara. The first assembly election in Kerala state was held in February–March 1957. The first Kerala Legislative Assembly was formed on 5 April 1957. The Assembly had 127 members including a nominated member.

The current delimitation committee of 2010 reaffirmed the total number of seats at 140.

== Legislature ==
The legislature consists of the governor and the Keralam Legislative Assembly, which is the highest political organ in the state. The governor has the power to summon the assembly or to close the same. All members of the legislative assembly are directly elected, normally once in every five years by the eligible voters who are above 18 years of age. The current assembly consists of 140 elected members. The elected members select one of its own members as its chairperson who is called the speaker of the assembly. The speaker is assisted by the deputy speaker who is also elected by the members. The conduct of a meeting in the house is the responsibility of the speaker.

The main function of the assembly is to pass laws and rules. Every bill passed by the house has to be finally approved by the governor before it becomes law.

The normal term of the legislative assembly is five years from the date appointed for its first meeting.

== Niyamasabha Complex ==
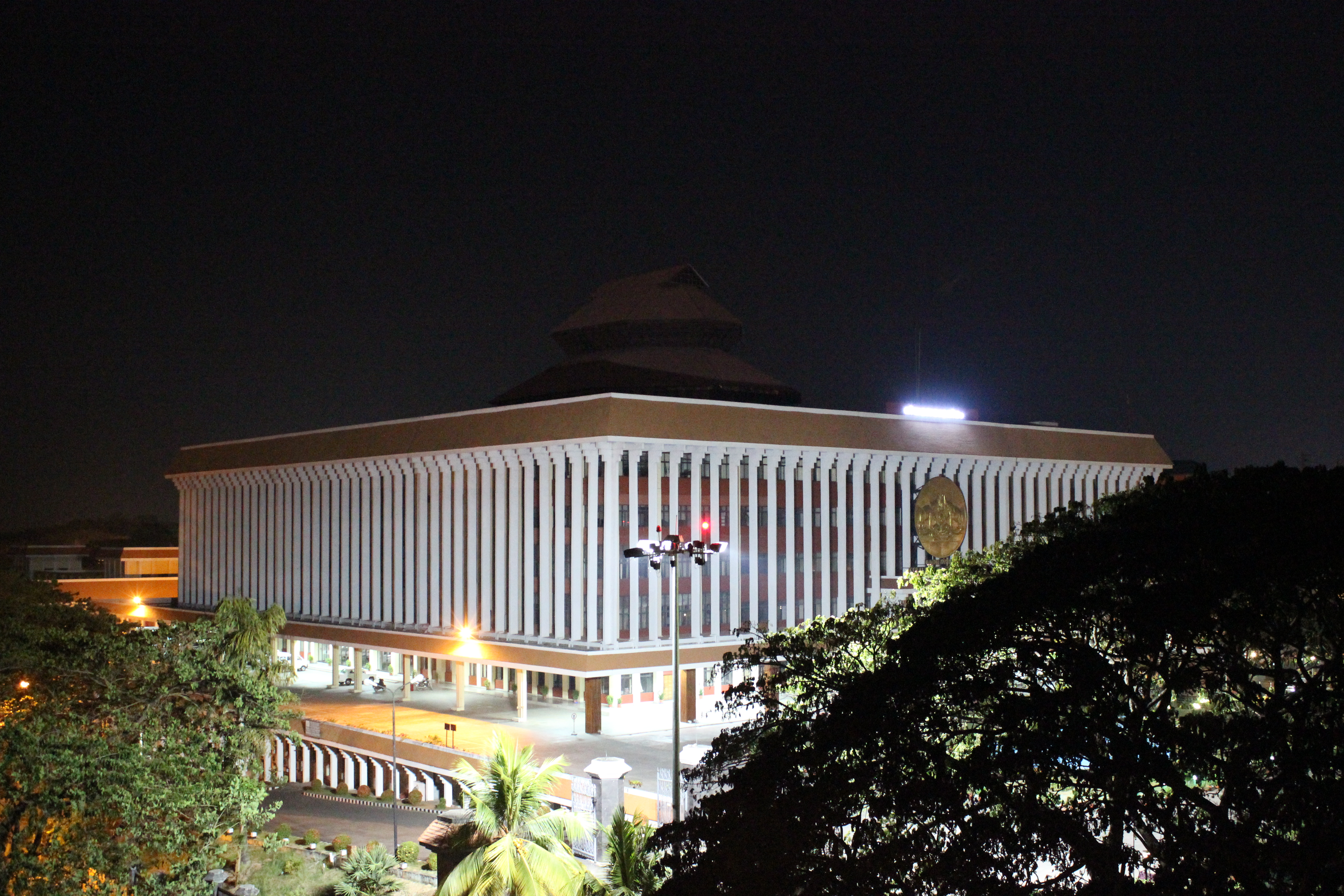
Kerala State Legislative Assembly or the Niyamasabha at night

The State Assembly is known as Niyamasabha and is housed in New Legislature Complex. This 5 storied complex is one of the largest complexes in India. The Central Hall is described as elegant and majestic, with ornamental Teakwood-Rosewood panelling. The older Assembly was located within the State Secretariat complex which was converted into the Legislature Museum, after the commissioning of the new complex on 22 May 1998 (K. R. Narayanan).

== Speakers of the Kerala Legislative Assembly ==
The Speaker of the Keralam Legislative Assembly is the presiding officer of the Legislative Assembly of the state of Kerala, the main law-making body for Kerala. He is elected by the members of the Kerala Legislative Assembly. The speaker is always a member of the Legislative Assembly. The current speaker of the Kerala Legislative Assembly is Thiruvanchoor Radhakrishnan.

== Composition ==
=== Reservation ===
Reservation	Number of members
Unreserved	124
Scheduled Castes	14
Scheduled Tribes	2
Total	140

=== Current seats by alliance ===
Alliance	Political party	No. of MLAs	Leader
Government; UDF; Seats: 102	Indian National Congress	63	V. D. Satheesan
Government; UDF; Seats: 102	Indian Union Muslim League	22	P. K. Kunhalikutty
Government; UDF; Seats: 102	Kerala Congress	7	Mons Joseph
Government; UDF; Seats: 102	Revolutionary Socialist Party	3	Shibu Baby John
Government; UDF; Seats: 102	Kerala Congress (Jacob)	1	Anoop Jacob
Government; UDF; Seats: 102	Revolutionary Marxist Party of India	1	K. K. Rema
Government; UDF; Seats: 102	Communist Marxist Party	1	C. P. John
Government; UDF; Seats: 102	Kerala Democratic Party	1	Mani C. Kappan
Government; UDF; Seats: 102	Independent	3	
Opposition; LDF; Seats: 35	Communist Party of India (Marxist)	26	Pinarayi Vijayan
Opposition; LDF; Seats: 35	Communist Party of India	8	K. Rajan
Opposition; LDF; Seats: 35	Rashtriya Janata Dal	1	P. K. Praveen
Other Opposition; NDA; Seats: 3	Bharatiya Janata Party	3	B. B. Gopakumar

== List of assemblies ==
Assembly (Election)	Ruling party	Chief Minister	Speaker	Leader of the Opposition	Opposition party
1st (1957 Election)	Communist Party of India	E. M. S. Namboodiripad	R. Sankara Narayanan Thampi	P. T. Chacko	Indian National Congress
2nd (1960 Election)	Praja Socialist Party	Pattom A. Thanu Pillai	K. M. Seethi Sahib C. H. Mohammed Koya Alexander Pattambithara	E. M. S. Namboodiripad	Communist Party of India
2nd (1960 Election)	Indian National Congress	R. Sankar	K. M. Seethi Sahib C. H. Mohammed Koya Alexander Pattambithara	E. M. S. Namboodiripad	Communist Party of India
3rd (1967 Election)	Communist Party of India (Marxist)	E. M. S. Namboodiripad	D. Damodaran Potti	K. Karunakaran	Indian National Congress
3rd (1967 Election)	Communist Party of India	C. Achutha Menon	D. Damodaran Potti	E. M. S. Namboodiripad	Communist Party of India (Marxist)
4th (1970 Election)	Communist Party of India	C. Achutha Menon	K. Moideenkutty Haji S. John	E. M. S. Namboodiripad	Communist Party of India (Marxist)
5th (1977 Election)	Indian National Congress	K. Karunakaran	Chakkeeri Ahamed Kutty	E. M. S. Namboodiripad	Communist Party of India (Marxist)
5th (1977 Election)	Indian National Congress	A. K. Antony	Chakkeeri Ahamed Kutty	E. M. S. Namboodiripad	Communist Party of India (Marxist)
5th (1977 Election)	Communist Party of India	P. K. Vasudevan Nair	Chakkeeri Ahamed Kutty	E. M. S. Namboodiripad	Communist Party of India (Marxist)
5th (1977 Election)	Indian Union Muslim League	C. H. Mohammed Koya	Chakkeeri Ahamed Kutty	E. M. S. Namboodiripad	Communist Party of India (Marxist)
6th (1980 Election)	Communist Party of India (Marxist)	E. K. Nayanar	A. P. Kurian	K. Karunakaran	Indian National Congress (I)
6th (1980 Election)	Indian National Congress	K. Karunakaran	A. C. Jose	E. K. Nayanar	Communist Party of India (Marxist)
7th (1982 Election)	Indian National Congress	K. Karunakaran	Vakkom Purushothaman V. M. Sudheeran	E. K. Nayanar	Communist Party of India (Marxist)
8th (1987 Election)	Communist Party of India (Marxist)	E. K. Nayanar	Varkala Radhakrishnan	K. Karunakaran	Indian National Congress
9th (1991 Election)	Indian National Congress	K. Karunakaran	P. P. Thankachan	E. K. Nayanar V. S. Achuthanandan	Communist Party of India (Marxist)
9th (1991 Election)	Indian National Congress	A. K. Antony	Therambil Ramakrishnan	E. K. Nayanar V. S. Achuthanandan	Communist Party of India (Marxist)
10th (1996 Election)	Communist Party of India (Marxist)	E. K. Nayanar	M. Vijayakumar	A. K. Antony	Indian National Congress
11th (2001 Election)	Indian National Congress	A. K. Antony	Vakkom Purushothaman	V. S. Achuthanandan	Communist Party of India (Marxist)
11th (2001 Election)	Indian National Congress	Oommen Chandy	Therambil Ramakrishnan	V. S. Achuthanandan	Communist Party of India (Marxist)
12th (2006 Election)	Communist Party of India (Marxist)	V. S. Achuthanandan	K. Radhakrishnan	Oommen Chandy	Indian National Congress
13th (2011 Election)	Indian National Congress	Oommen Chandy	G. Karthikeyan N. Sakthan	V. S. Achuthanandan	Communist Party of India (Marxist)
14th (2016 Election)	Communist Party of India (Marxist)	Pinarayi Vijayan	P. Sreeramakrishnan	Ramesh Chennithala	Indian National Congress
15th (2021 Election)	Communist Party of India (Marxist)	Pinarayi Vijayan	M. B. Rajesh A. N. Shamseer	V. D. Satheesan	Indian National Congress
16th (2026 Election)	Indian National Congress	V. D. Satheesan	Thiruvanchoor Radhakrishnan	Pinarayi Vijayan	Communist Party of India (Marxist)

== Members of Legislative Assembly ==
District	No.	Constituency	Name	Party	Alliance	Remarks
Kasaragod	1	Manjeshwaram	A. K. M. Ashraf	IUML	UDF	
Kasaragod	2	Kasaragod	Kallatra Mahin	IUML	UDF	
Kasaragod	3	Udma	K. Neelakandan	INC	UDF	
Kasaragod	4	Kanhangad	Govindan Pallikappil	CPI	LDF	
Kasaragod	5	Thrikaripur	Sandeep Varier	INC	UDF	
Kannur	6	Payyanur	V. Kunhikrishnan	IND	UDF	
Kannur	7	Kalliasseri	M. Vijin	CPI(M)	LDF	
Kannur	8	Taliparamba	T K Govindan Master	IND	UDF	
Kannur	9	Irikkur	Sajeev Joseph	INC	UDF	
Kannur	10	Azhikode	K. V. Sumesh	CPI(M)	LDF	
Kannur	11	Kannur	T.O Mohanan	INC	UDF	
Kannur	12	Dharmadom	Pinarayi Vijayan	CPI(M)	LDF	Leader of the Opposition
Kannur	13	Thalassery	Karayi Rajan	CPI(M)	LDF	
Kannur	14	Kuthuparamba	P. K. Praveen	RJD	LDF	
Kannur	15	Mattanur	V. K. Sanoj	CPI(M)	LDF	
Kannur	16	Peravoor	Adv Sunny Joseph	INC	UDF	Minister for Electricity, Environment & Parliamentary Affairs
Wayanad	17	Mananthavady (ST)	Usha Vijayan	INC	UDF	
Wayanad	18	Sulthan Bathery (ST)	I. C. Balakrishnan	INC	UDF	
Wayanad	19	Kalpetta	T. Siddique	INC	UDF	Minister for Agriculture
Kozhikode	20	Vatakara	K. K. Rema	RMPI	UDF	
Kozhikode	21	Kuttiady	Parakkal Abdulla	IUML	UDF	
Kozhikode	22	Nadapuram	K. M. Abhijith	INC	UDF	
Kozhikode	23	Koyilandy	K. Praveen Kumar	INC	UDF	
Kozhikode	24	Perambra	Fathima Thahiliya	IUML	UDF	
Kozhikode	25	Balussery (SC)	V. T. Sooraj	INC	UDF	
Kozhikode	26	Elathur	Vidya Balakrishnan	INC	UDF	
Kozhikode	27	Kozhikode North	K.Jayanth	INC	UDF	
Kozhikode	28	Kozhikode South	Fyzal Babu	IUML	UDF	
Kozhikode	29	Beypore	P. A. Mohammed Riyas	CPI(M)	LDF	
Kozhikode	30	Kunnamangalam	M. A. Razak Master	IUML	UDF	
Kozhikode	31	Koduvally	P. K. Firos	IUML	UDF	
Kozhikode	32	Thiruvambady	C. K. Kasim	IUML	UDF	
Malappuram	33	Kondotty	T. P Ashrafali	IUML	UDF	
Malappuram	34	Eranad	P. K. Basheer	IUML	UDF	Minister for Public Works Department
Malappuram	35	Nilambur	Aryadan Shoukath	INC	UDF	
Malappuram	36	Wandoor (SC)	A. P. Anil Kumar	INC	UDF	Minister for Revenue
Malappuram	37	Manjeri	M. Rahmathulla	IUML	UDF	
Malappuram	38	Perinthalmanna	Najeeb Kanthapuram	IUML	UDF	
Malappuram	39	Mankada	Manjalamkuzhi Ali	IUML	UDF	
Malappuram	40	Malappuram	P. K. Kunhalikutty	IUML	UDF	Minister for Industries, and Information Technology
Malappuram	41	Vengara	K. M. Shaji	IUML	UDF	Minister for Local Self Governments
Malappuram	42	Vallikkunnu	T. V. Ibrahim	IUML	UDF	
Malappuram	43	Tirurangadi	P. M. A. Sameer	IUML	UDF	
Malappuram	44	Tanur	P. K. Navas	IUML	UDF	
Malappuram	45	Tirur	Kurukkoli Moideen	IUML	UDF	
Malappuram	46	Kottakkal	K. K. Abid Hussain Thangal	IUML	UDF	
Malappuram	47	Thavanur	V. S Joy	INC	UDF	
Malappuram	48	Ponnani	K. P Noushad Ali	INC	UDF	
Palakkad	49	Thrithala	V. T. Balram	INC	UDF	
Palakkad	50	Pattambi	Muhammed Muhsin	CPI	LDF	
Palakkad	51	Shornur	P. Mammikutty	CPI(M)	LDF	
Palakkad	52	Ottapalam	K. Premkumar	CPI(M)	LDF	
Palakkad	53	Kongad (SC)	K. A. Thulasi	INC	UDF	Minister of Scheduled Castes, Scheduled Tribes and Backward Classes Welfare
Palakkad	54	Mannarkkad	N. Samsudheen	IUML	UDF	Minister for General Education, and Minority Affairs
Palakkad	55	Malampuzha	A. Prabhakaran	CPI(M)	LDF	
Palakkad	56	Palakkad	Ramesh Pisharody	INC	UDF	
Palakkad	57	Tarur (SC)	Sumod	CPI(M)	LDF	
Palakkad	58	Chittur	Sumesh Achuthan	INC	UDF	
Palakkad	59	Nenmara	K. Preman	CPI(M)	LDF	
Palakkad	60	Alathur	T. M. Sasi	CPI(M)	LDF	
Thrissur	61	Chelakkara (SC)	U. R. Pradeep	CPI(M)	LDF	
Thrissur	62	Kunnamkulam	A. C. Moideen	CPI(M)	LDF	
Thrissur	63	Guruvayur	N. K. Akbar	CPI(M)	LDF	
Thrissur	64	Manalur	C. Raveendranath	CPI(M)	LDF	
Thrissur	65	Wadakkanchery	Xavier Chittilappilly	CPI(M)	LDF	
Thrissur	66	Ollur	K. Rajan	CPI	LDF	
Thrissur	67	Thrissur	Rajan Pallan	INC	UDF	
Thrissur	68	Nattika (SC)	Geetha Gopi	CPI	LDF	
Thrissur	69	Kaipamangalam	K. K. Valsaraj	CPI	LDF	
Thrissur	70	Irinjalakuda	Thomas Unniyadan	KC	UDF	
Thrissur	71	Puthukkad	K. K. Ramachandran	CPI(M)	LDF	
Thrissur	72	Chalakudy	T. J. Saneesh Kumar Joseph	INC	UDF	
Thrissur	73	Kodungallur	O. J. Janeesh	INC	UDF	Minister of Youth Affairs, Sports, Registration & Museum
Ernakulam	74	Perumbavoor	Manoj Moothedan	INC	UDF	
Ernakulam	75	Angamaly	Roji M. John	INC	UDF	Minister for Higher Education
Ernakulam	76	Aluva	Anwar Sadath	INC	UDF	
Ernakulam	77	Kalamassery	V. E. Abdul Gafoor	IUML	UDF	Minister for Fisheries, Social Justice & Harbour Engineering
Ernakulam	78	Paravur	V. D. Satheesan	INC	UDF	Chief Minister of Kerala
Ernakulam	79	Vypin	Tony Chammany	INC	UDF	
Ernakulam	80	Kochi	Mohammad Shiyas	INC	UDF	
Ernakulam	81	Thrippunithura	Deepak Joy	INC	UDF	
Ernakulam	82	Ernakulam	T. J. Vinod	INC	UDF	
Ernakulam	83	Thrikkakara	Uma Thomas	INC	UDF	
Ernakulam	84	Kunnathunad (SC)	V. P. Sajeendran	INC	UDF	
Ernakulam	85	Piravom	Anoop Jacob	KC(J)	UDF	Minister of Food, Civil Supplies & Consumer Affairs
Ernakulam	86	Muvattupuzha	Mathew Kuzhalnadan	INC	UDF	
Ernakulam	87	Kothamangalam	Shibu Thekkumpuram	KEC	UDF	
Idukki	88	Devikulam (SC)	F Raja	INC	UDF	
Idukki	89	Udumbanchola	Senapathy Venu	INC	UDF	
Idukki	90	Thodupuzha	Apu John Joseph	KC	UDF	Government Chief Whip
Idukki	91	Idukki	Roy K Paulose	INC	UDF	
Idukki	92	Peerumade	Cyriac Thomas	INC	UDF	
Kottayam	93	Pala	Mani C. Kappan	DCK	UDF	
Kottayam	94	Kaduthuruthy	Mons Joseph	KEC	UDF	Minister of Irrigation & Housing
Kottayam	95	Vaikom (SC)	K. Binimon	INC	UDF	
Kottayam	96	Ettumanoor	Nattakom Suresh	INC	UDF	
Kottayam	97	Kottayam	Thiruvanchoor Radhakrishnan	INC	UDF	Speaker
Kottayam	98	Puthuppally	Chandy Oommen	INC	UDF	
Kottayam	99	Changanassery	Vinu Job Kuzhimannil	KEC	UDF	
Kottayam	100	Kanjirappally	Rony K Baby	INC	UDF	
Kottayam	101	Poonjar	Sebastian M. J.	INC	UDF	
Alappuzha	102	Aroor	Shanimol Osman	INC	UDF	Deputy Speaker
Alappuzha	103	Cherthala	P. Prasad	CPI	LDF	
Alappuzha	104	Alappuzha	A.D.Thomas	INC	UDF	
Alappuzha	105	Ambalappuzha	G. Sudhakaran	IND	UDF	
Alappuzha	106	Kuttanad	Reji Cheriyan	KC	UDF	
Alappuzha	107	Haripad	Ramesh Chennithala	INC	UDF	Minister for Home, Vigilance, and Coir
Alappuzha	108	Kayamkulam	M. Liju	INC	UDF	Minister of Excise & Cooperation
Alappuzha	109	Mavelikara (SC)	M. S. Arun Kumar	CPI(M)	LDF	
Alappuzha	110	Chengannur	Saji Cherian	CPI(M)	LDF	
Pathanamthitta	111	Thiruvalla	Varghese Mammen	KC	UDF	
Pathanamthitta	112	Ranni	Pazhakulam Madhu	INC	UDF	
Pathanamthitta	113	Aranmula	Abin Varkey	INC	UDF	
Pathanamthitta	114	Konni	K. U. Jenish Kumar	CPI(M)	LDF	
Pathanamthitta	115	Adoor (SC)	Adv. C. V. Santhakumar	INC	UDF	
Kollam	116	Karunagapally	C. R. Mahesh	INC	UDF	
Kollam	117	Chavara	Shibu Baby John	RSP	UDF	Minister of Forests & Widlife Protection
Kollam	118	Kunnathur (SC)	Ullas Kovoor	RSP	UDF	
Kollam	119	Kottarakkara	K. N. Balagopal	CPI(M)	LDF	
Kollam	120	Pathanapuram	Jyothi Kumar Chamakkala	INC	UDF	
Kollam	121	Punalur	C. Ajayaprasad	CPI	LDF	
Kollam	122	Chadayamangalam	M. M. Naseer	INC	UDF	
Kollam	123	Kundara	P. C. Vishnunadh	INC	UDF	Minister of Tourism, Culture & Cinema
Kollam	124	Kollam	Bindu Krishna	INC	UDF	Minister of Labour, Dairy Development, Women & Child Development & Animal Husbandry
Kollam	125	Eravipuram	Vishnu Mohan	RSP	UDF	
Kollam	126	Chathannoor	B. B. Gopakumar	BJP	NDA	BJP parliamentary party leader of Kerala.
Thiruvananthapuram	127	Varkala	V. Joy	CPI(M)	LDF	
Thiruvananthapuram	128	Attingal	O. S. Ambika	CPI(M)	LDF	
Thiruvananthapuram	129	Chirayinkeezhu (SC)	Ramya Haridas	INC	UDF	
Thiruvananthapuram	130	Nedumangad	G. R. Anil	CPI	LDF	
Thiruvananthapuram	131	Vamanapuram	Sudheersha Palode	INC	UDF	
Thiruvananthapuram	132	Kazhakkoottam	V. Muraleedharan	BJP	NDA	
Thiruvananthapuram	133	Vattiyoorkavu	K. Muraleedharan	INC	UDF	Minister of Health & Devaswoms
Thiruvananthapuram	134	Thiruvananthapuram	C. P. John	CMP	UDF	Minister of Transport
Thiruvananthapuram	135	Nemom	Rajeev Chandrasekhar	BJP	NDA	
Thiruvananthapuram	136	Aruvikkara	G. Steephen	CPI(M)	LDF	
Thiruvananthapuram	137	Parassala	C. K. Hareendran	CPI(M)	LDF	
Thiruvananthapuram	138	Kattakkada	M. R. Baiju	INC	UDF	
Thiruvananthapuram	139	Kovalam	M. Vincent	INC	UDF	
Thiruvananthapuram	140	Neyyattinkara	N. Sakthan	INC	UDF	

== Past composition ==
1) 1957–1960

60	9	43	14
CPI	PSP	INC	Ind

2) 1960–1965

63	11	29	20	14
INC	IUML	CPI	PSP	Ind

3) 1965–1967

40	3	13	36	26	6	12
CPI (M)	CPI	SSP	INC	KC	IUML	Ind

4) 1967–1970

52	19	19	9	5	14	15
CPI (M)	CPI	SSP	INC	KC	IUML	Ind

5) 1970–1977

29	16	6	3	6	3	1	30	12	11	16
CPI (M)	CPI	RSP	PSP	SSP	ISP	KSP	INC	KC	IUML	Ind

6) 1977–1980

17	23	9	3	2	6	5	20	38	3	13	1
CPI (M)	CPI	RSP	PSP	KCP	BLD	NDP	KC	INC	AIML	IUML	Ind

7) 1980–1982

35	17	6	1	1	21	3	8	6	5	17	5	14	1
CPI (M)	CPI	RSP	PSP	KCP	INC (I)	NDP	KCM	KCJ	JP	INC (U)	AIML	IUML	Ind

8) 1982–1987

28	13	4	1	1	7	2	1	20	1	4	6	8	4	4	15	4	14	3
CPI (M)	CPI	RSP	RSP (S)	PSP	INC (S)	SRP	DSP	INC (I)	DLP	NDP	KCM	KCJ	JP	JP (G)	INC (A)	AIML	IUML	Ind

9) 1987–1991

38	16	5	6	1	33	7	5	15	14
CPI (M)	CPI	RSP	ICS (SCS)	LD	INC	JP	KC	IUML	Ind

10) 1991–1996

28	12	1	1	2	2	1	2	55	1	10	3	19	4
CPI (M)	CPI	CMP	CMP (K)	RSP	IC (S)	LD	NDP	INC	KC	KCM	JD	IUML	Ind

11) 1996–2001

40	18	5	1	1	3	1	37	6	5	4	13	5
CPI (M)	CPI	RSP	JSS	KCB	IC (S)	KCA	INC	KC	KCM	JD	IUML	Ind

12) 2001–2006

24	7	1	2	2	4	2	2	3	63	9	2	2	16	1
CPI (M)	CPI	CMP	RSP	RSPB	JSS	KCB	KCA	JDS	INC	KCM	KCJ	NCP	IUML	Ind

13) 2006–2011

61	17	3	1	1	5	1	1	24	4	7	1	1	7	5
CPI (M)	CPI	RSP	JSS	KCB	JDS	C (S)	INL	INC	KC	KCM	KCS	NCP	IUML	Ind

14) 2011–2016

45	13	2	1	1	1	2	4	38	9	2	20	2
CPI (M)	CPI	RSP	RSPBJ	KCB	KCA	SJD	JDS	INC	KCM	NCP	IUML	Ind

15) 2016–2021

58	19	1	1	1	3	1	1	22	6	2	18	1	5
CPI (M)	CPI	CMP	KCB	KCA	JDS	C (S)	NSC	INC	KCM	NCP	IUML	BJP	Ind

16) 2021–2026

62	17	1	1	1	1	2	1	1	1	21	2	5	1	2	15	6
CPI (M)	CPI	RMPI	KCB	JKC	KCA	JDS	C (S)	INL	LJD	INC	KC	KCM	NCK	NCP	IUML	Ind

17) 2026

63	22	7	3	1	1	1	1	3	26	8	1	3
INC	IUML	KCE	RSP	KC(J)	RMPI	CMP	KDP	Ind	CPI (M)	CPI	RJD	BJP

== See also ==
- Sree Moolam Popular Assembly
- 2026 Kerala Legislative Assembly election
- 2021 Kerala Legislative Assembly election
- 2019 Kerala Legislative Assembly by-elections
- 2016 Kerala Legislative Assembly election
- 2011 Kerala Legislative Assembly election
