= 14th Kerala Assembly =

2016–2021 Kerala Assembly term

←	13th	15th	→

Overview
- Legislative body: Kerala Legislative Assembly
- Term: 20 May 2016 – 03 May 2021
- Election: 2016 Kerala Legislative Assembly election
- Government: First Vijayan ministry
- Opposition: UDF
- Members: 140
- Speaker: P. Sreeramakrishnan
- Deputy Speaker: V. Sasi
- Leader of the House: Pinarayi Vijayan
- Leader of the Opposition: Ramesh Chennithala
- Deputy Leader of the Opposition: M. K. Muneer
- Chief Whip: K. Rajan
- Party control: LDF

The 14th Assembly of Kerala was elected in the 2016 Kerala Legislative Assembly election. The Speaker was P. Sreeramakrishnan from the CPI(M). The Deputy Speaker was V. Sasi of CPI. The leader of the Assembly was Pinarayi Vijayan from CPI(M). The leader of opposition was Ramesh Chennithala of Indian National Congress. The Government Chief Whip was K. Rajan of the CPI.

== Political parties or coalitions ==
No.	Front/Alliance	Seats
1	LDF	91
2	UDF	41
3	NDA	2
4	Vacant	6

== Members ==
Key

CPI(M) CPI JD(S) NCP Cong(S) KC(B) RSP(L) INL Independent INC IUML KC(M) KC(J) BJP NCK

No.	Constituency	Member	Party	Alliance
Kasaragod district
1	Manjeshwaram	M. C. Kamaruddin	IUML	UDF
2	Kasaragod	N. A. Nellikkunnu	IUML	UDF
3	Udma	K. Kunhiraman	CPI(M)	LDF
4	Kanhangad	E. Chandrasekharan	CPI	LDF
5	Thrikaripur	M. Rajagopalan	CPI(M)	LDF
Kannur district
6	Payyanur	C. Krishnan	CPI(M)	LDF
7	Kalliasseri	T. V. Rajesh	CPI(M)	LDF
8	Taliparamba	James Mathew	CPI(M)	LDF
9	Irikkur	K. C. Joseph	INC	UDF
10	Azhikode	K. M. Shaji	IUML	UDF
11	Kannur	Kadannappalli Ramachandran	Con (S)	LDF
12	Dharmadam	Pinarayi Vijayan	CPI(M)	LDF
13	Thalassery	A. N. Shamseer	CPI(M)	LDF
14	Kuthuparamba	K. K. Shailaja	CPI(M)	LDF
15	Mattanur	E. P. Jayarajan	CPI(M)	LDF
16	Peravoor	Sunny Joseph	INC	UDF
Wayanad district
17	Mananthavady (ST)	O. R. Kelu	CPI(M)	LDF
18	Sulthan Bathery (ST)	I. C. Balakrishnan	INC	UDF
19	Kalpetta	C. K. Saseendran	CPI(M)	LDF
Kozhikode district
20	Vadakara	C. K. Nanu	JD(S)	LDF
21	Kuttiady	Parakkal Abdulla	IUML	UDF
22	Nadapuram	E. K. Vijayan	CPI	LDF
23	Quilandy	K. Dasan	CPI(M)	LDF
24	Perambra	T. P. Ramakrishnan	CPI(M)	LDF
25	Balussery (SC)	Purushan Kadalundy	CPI(M)	LDF
26	Elathur	A. K. Saseendran	NCP	LDF
27	Kozhikode North	A. Pradeepkumar	CPI(M)	LDF
28	Kozhikode South	M. K. Muneer	IUML	UDF
29	Beypore	V. K. C. Mammed Koya	CPI(M)	LDF
30	Kunnamangalam	P. T. A. Rahim	Ind.	LDF
31	Koduvally	Karat Razak	Ind.	LDF
32	Thiruvambady	George M. Thomas	CPI(M)	LDF
Malappuram district
33	Kondotty	T. V. Ibrahim	IUML	UDF
34	Eranad	P. K. Basheer	IUML	UDF
35	Nilambur	P. V. Anvar	Ind.	LDF
36	Wandoor (SC)	A. P. Anil Kumar	INC	UDF
37	Manjeri	M. Ummer	IUML	UDF
38	Perinthalmanna	Manjalamkuzhi Ali	IUML	UDF
39	Mankada	T. A. Ahmed Kabir	IUML	UDF
40	Malappuram	P. Ubaidulla	IUML	UDF
41	Vengara	K. N. A. Khader	IUML	UDF
42	Vallikunnu	P. Abdul Hameed	IUML	UDF
43	Tirurangadi	P. K. Abdu Rabb	IUML	UDF
44	Tanur	V. Abdurahiman	INL	LDF
45	Tirur	C. Mammutty	IUML	UDF
46	Kottakkal	K. K. Abid Hussain Thangal	IUML	UDF
47	Thavanur	K.T. Jaleel	Ind.	LDF
48	Ponnani	P. Sreeramakrishnan	CPI(M)	LDF
Palakkad district
49	Thrithala	V. T. Balram	INC	UDF
50	Pattambi	Muhammed Muhsin	CPI	LDF
51	Shornur	P. K. Sasi	CPI(M)	LDF
52	Ottapalam	P. Unni	CPI(M)	LDF
53	Kongad (SC)	Vacant		
54	Mannarkkad	N. Samsudheen	IUML	UDF
55	Malampuzha	V. S. Achuthanandan	CPI(M)	LDF
56	Palakkad	Shafi Parambil	INC	UDF
57	Tarur (SC)	A. K. Balan	CPI(M)	LDF
58	Chittur	K. Krishnankutty	JD(S)	LDF
59	Nenmara	K. Babu	CPI(M)	LDF
60	Alathur	K. D. Prasenan	CPI(M)	LDF
Thrissur district
61	Chelakkara (SC)	U. R. Pradeep	CPI(M)	LDF
62	Kunnamkulam	A. C. Moideen	CPI(M)	LDF
63	Guruvayur	K. V. Abdul Khader	CPI(M)	LDF
64	Manalur	Murali Perunelli	CPI(M)	LDF
65	Wadakkanchery	Anil Akkara	INC	UDF
66	Ollur	K. Rajan	CPI	LDF
67	Thrissur	V. S. Sunil Kumar	CPI	LDF
68	Nattika (SC)	Geetha Gopi	CPI	LDF
69	Kaipamangalam	E. T. Tyson	CPI	LDF
70	Irinjalakuda	K. U. Arunan	CPI(M)	LDF
71	Puthukkad	C. Raveendranath	CPI(M)	LDF
72	Chalakudy	B. D. Devassy	CPI(M)	LDF
73	Kodungallur	V. R. Sunil Kumar	CPI	LDF
Ernakulam district
74	Perumbavoor	Eldhose Kunnappilly	INC	UDF
75	Angamaly	Roji M. John	INC	UDF
76	Aluva	Anwar Sadath	INC	UDF
77	Kalamassery	V. K. Ebrahimkunju	IUML	UDF
78	Paravur	V. D. Satheesan	INC	UDF
79	Vypen	S. Sharma	CPI(M)	LDF
80	Kochi	K. J. Maxi	CPI(M)	LDF
81	Thrippunithura	M. Swaraj	CPI(M)	LDF
82	Ernakulam	T. J. Vinod	INC	UDF
83	Thrikkakara	Uma Thomas	INC	UDF
84	Kunnathunad (SC)	V.P. Sajeendran	INC	UDF
85	Piravom	Anoop Jacob	KC (J)	UDF
86	Muvattupuzha	Eldo Abraham	CPI	LDF
87	Kothamangalam	Antony John	CPI(M)	LDF
Idukki district
88	Devikulam	S. Rajendran	CPI(M)	LDF
89	Udumbanchola	M. M. Mani	CPI(M)	LDF
90	Thodupuzha	Vacant		
91	Idukki	Roshy Augustine	KC(M)	LDF
92	Peerumade	E. S. Bijimol	CPI	LDF
Kottayam district
93	Pala	Mani C. Kappan	NCK	UDF
94	Kaduthuruthy	Vacant		
95	Vaikom (SC)	C. K. Asha	CPI	LDF
96	Ettumanoor	K. Suresh Kurup	CPI(M)	LDF
97	Kottayam	Thiruvanchoor Radhakrishnan	INC	UDF
98	Puthuppally	Oommen Chandy	INC	UDF
99	Changanassery	Vacant		
100	Kanjirappally	N. Jayaraj	KC(M)	LDF
101	Poonjar	P. C. George	KJ(S)	NDA
Alappuzha district
102	Aroor	Shanimol Osman	INC	UDF
103	Cherthala	P. Thilothaman	CPI	LDF
104	Alappuzha	T. M. Thomas Isaac	CPI(M)	LDF
105	Ambalappuzha	G. Sudhakaran	CPI(M)	LDF
106	Kuttanad	Vacant		
107	Haripad	Ramesh Chennithala	INC	UDF
108	Kayamkulam	Prathiba Hari	CPI(M)	LDF
109	Mavelikara	R. Rajesh	CPI(M)	LDF
110	Chengannur	Saji Cherian	CPI(M)	LDF
Pathanamthitta district
111	Thiruvalla	Mathew T. Thomas	JD(S)	LDF
112	Ranni	Raju Abraham	CPI(M)	LDF
113	Aranmula	Veena George	CPI(M)	LDF
114	Konni	K. U. Jenish Kumar	CPI(M)	LDF
115	Adoor	Chittayam Gopakumar	CPI	LDF
Kollam district
116	Karunagapally	R. Ramachandran	CPI	LDF
117	Chavara	Vacant		
118	Kunnathur	Kovoor Kunjumon	RSP (L)	LDF
119	Kottarakkara	P. Aisha Potty	CPI(M)	LDF
120	Pathanapuram	K. B. Ganesh Kumar	KC(B)	LDF
121	Punalur	K. Raju	CPI	LDF
122	Chadayamangalam	Mullakara Ratnakaran	CPI	LDF
123	Kundara	J. Mercykutty Amma	CPI(M)	LDF
124	Kollam	M. Mukesh	CPI(M)	LDF
125	Eravipuram	M. Noushad	CPI(M)	LDF
126	Chathannoor	G.S. Jayalal	CPI	LDF
Thiruvananthapuram district
127	Varkala	V. Joy	CPI(M)	LDF
128	Attingal	B. Satyan	CPI(M)	LDF
129	Chirayinkeezhu	V. Sasi	CPI	LDF
130	Nedumangad	C. Divakaran	CPI	LDF
131	Vamanapuram	D. K. Murali	CPI(M)	LDF
132	Kazhakootam	Kadakampally Surendran	CPI(M)	LDF
133	Vattiyoorkavu	V. K. Prasanth	CPI(M)	LDF
134	Thiruvananthapuram	V. S. Sivakumar	INC	UDF
135	Nemom	O. Rajagopal	BJP	NDA
136	Aruvikkara	K. S. Sabarinathan	INC	UDF
137	Parassala	C. K. Hareendran	CPI(M)	LDF
138	Kattakada	I. B. Sathish	CPI(M)	LDF
139	Kovalam	M. Vincent	INC	UDF
140	Neyyattinkara	K. A. Ansalan	CPI(M)	LDF
141	Nominated	John Fernandez		

== See also ==
- 2021 Kerala Legislative Assembly election
- 2019 Kerala Legislative Assembly by-elections
- 2016 Kerala Legislative Assembly election
- 2011 Kerala Legislative Assembly election
