= 13th Kerala Assembly =

2011–2016 Kerala Assembly term

| ← | 12th | 14th | → |

Overview
- Legislative body: Kerala Legislative Assembly
- Term: 14 May 2011 – 20 May 2016
- Election: 2011 Kerala Legislative Assembly election
- Government: Second Oommen ministry
- Opposition: LDF
- Members: 140
- Speaker: G. Karthikeyan (until 2015); N. Sakthan (2015-2016)
- Deputy Speaker: N. Sakthan (until 2015); Palode Ravi (2015-2016)
- Leader of the House: Oommen Chandy
- Leader of the Opposition: V. S. Achuthanandan
- Chief Whip: P. C. George (until 2015); Thomas Unniyadan (2015-2016)
- Party control: UDF

The 13th Assembly of Kerala was elected in the 2011 Kerala Legislative Assembly election. The Speaker of the assembly was G. Karthikeyan till his death on 7 March 2015 after which N. Sakthan, the Deputy Speaker succeeded him till the end of his term. The Deputy Speaker was N. Sakthan till March 2015 and was succeeded by Palode Ravi from the Indian National Congress. The leader of the Assembly was Oommen Chandy from INC. The leader of opposition was V. S. Achuthanandan of the CPI(M). The Government Chief Whip was P. C. George of the KEC(M) until 7th April 2015 after which Thomas Unniyadan succeeded him as Chief Whip and served till the dissolution of the assembly. A total of 146 Bills were passed in 237 sittings.

== Political parties or coalitions ==
| No. | Alliance | Seats won | Votes | Percentage |
|---|---|---|---|---|
| 1 | United Democratic Front | 73 | 8,002,874 | 45.83 |
| 2 | Left Democratic Front | 67 | 7,846,703 | 44.94 |
| 3 | National Democratic Alliance | 0 | 1,058,504 | 6.06 |
| 4 | Others | 0 | 553,832 | 3.17 |

== Members ==
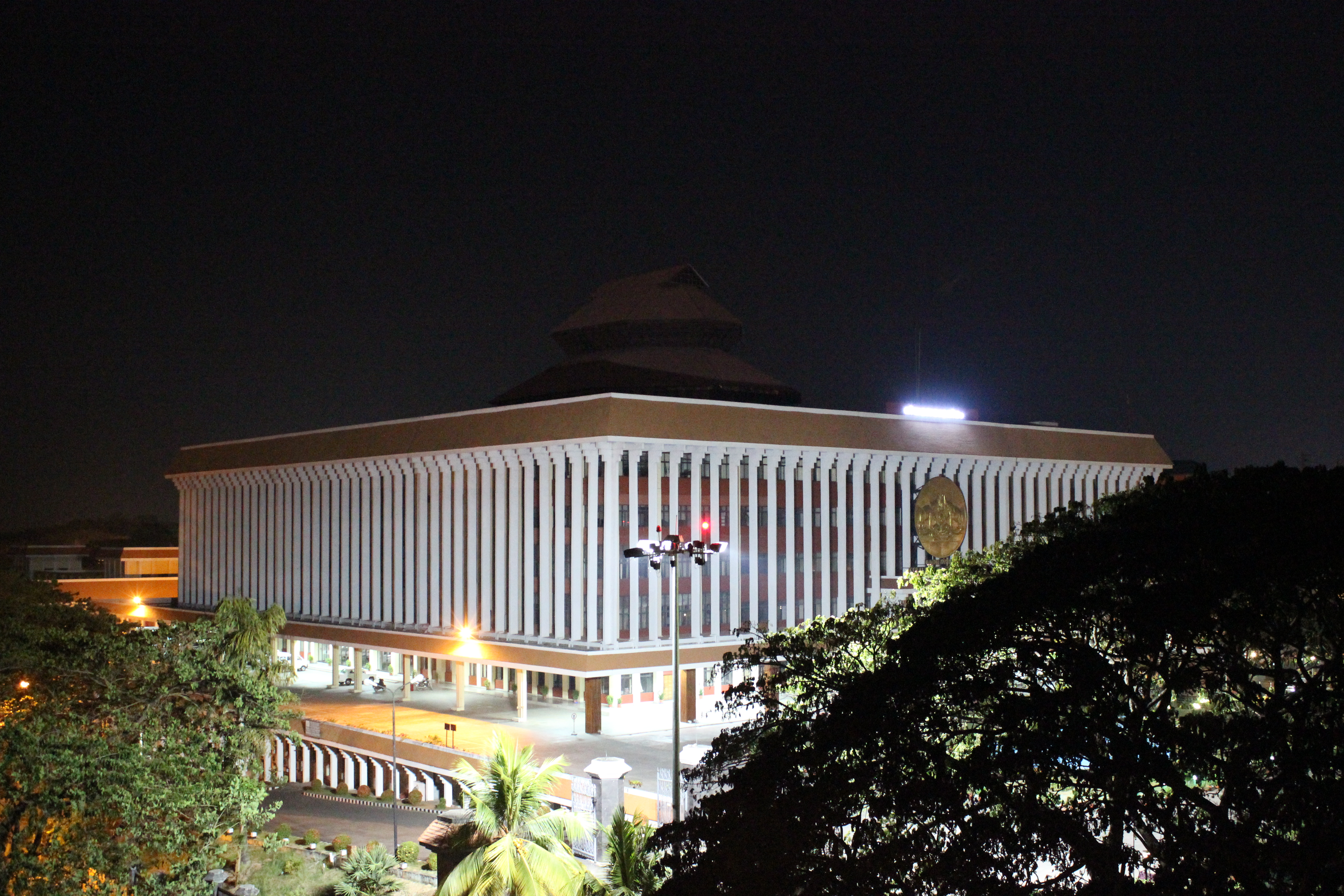
Kerala State Legislative Assembly or the Niyamasabha at night

| District | No. | Constituency | Name | Party |
|---|---|---|---|---|
| Kasaragod | 1 | Manjeshwaram | P. B. Abdul Razak | IUML |
| Kasaragod | 2 | Kasaragod | N. A. Nellikkunnu | IUML |
| Kasaragod | 3 | Udma | K. Kunhiraman | CPI(M) |
| Kasaragod | 4 | Kanhangad | E. Chandrasekharan | CPI |
| Kasaragod | 5 | Thrikaripur | K. Kunhiraman | CPI(M) |
| Kannur | 6 | Payyanur | C. Krishnan | CPI(M) |
| Kannur | 7 | Kalliasseri | T. V. Rajesh | CPI(M) |
| Kannur | 8 | Taliparamba | James Mathew | CPI(M) |
| Kannur | 9 | Irikkur | K. C. Joseph | INC |
| Kannur | 10 | Azhikode | K.M. Shaji | IUML |
| Kannur | 11 | Kannur | A. P. Abdullakutty | INC |
| Kannur | 12 | Dharmadam | K. K. Narayanan | CPI(M) |
| Kannur | 13 | Thalassery | Kodiyeri Balakrishnan | CPI(M) |
| Kannur | 14 | Kuthuparamba | K. P. Mohanan | JD(U) |
| Kannur | 15 | Mattannur | E. P. Jayarajan | CPI(M) |
| Kannur | 16 | Peravoor | Sunny Joseph | INC |
| Wayanad | 17 | Mananthavady | P. K. Jayalakshmi | INC |
| Wayanad | 18 | Sulthan Bathery | I. C. Balakrishnan | INC |
| Wayanad | 19 | Kalpetta | M. V. Shreyams Kumar | JD(U) |
| Kozhikode | 20 | Vadakara | C. K. Nanu | JD(S) |
| Kozhikode | 21 | Kuttiady | K. K. Lathika | CPI(M) |
| Kozhikode | 22 | Nadapuram | E. K. Vijayan | CPI |
| Kozhikode | 23 | Koyilandy | K. Dasan | CPI(M) |
| Kozhikode | 24 | Perambra | K. Kunhahammed Master | CPI(M) |
| Kozhikode | 25 | Balusseri | Purushan Kadalundy | CPI(M) |
| Kozhikode | 26 | Elathur | A. K. Saseendran | NCP |
| Kozhikode | 27 | Kozhikode North | A. Pradeepkumar | CPI(M) |
| Kozhikode | 28 | Kozhikode South | M. K. Muneer | IUML |
| Kozhikode | 29 | Beypore | Elamaram Kareem | CPI(M) |
| Kozhikode | 30 | Kunnamangalam | P. T. A. Rahim | Independent |
| Kozhikode | 31 | Koduvally | V. M. Ummer Master | IUML |
| Kozhikode | 32 | Thiruvambady | C. Moyinkutty | IUML |
| Malappuram | 33 | Kondotty | P. Mohammedunni Haji | IUML |
| Malappuram | 34 | Ernad | P. K. Basheer | IUML |
| Malappuram | 35 | Nilambur | Aryadan Mohammed | INC |
| Malappuram | 36 | Wandoor (SC) | A.P. Anil Kumar | INC |
| Malappuram | 37 | Manjeri | M. Ummer | IUML |
| Malappuram | 38 | Perinthalmanna | Manjalamkuzhi Ali | IUML |
| Malappuram | 39 | Mankada | T. A. Ahmed Kabir | IUML |
| Malappuram | 40 | Malappuram | P. Ubaidulla | IUML |
| Malappuram | 41 | Vengara | P. K. Kunhalikutty | IUML |
| Malappuram | 42 | Vallikunnu | K. N. A. Khader | IUML |
| Malappuram | 43 | Tirurangadi | P. K. Abdu Rabb | IUML |
| Malappuram | 44 | Tanur | Abdurahman Randathani | IUML |
| Malappuram | 45 | Tirur | C. Mammutty | IUML |
| Malappuram | 46 | Kottakkal | M. P. Abdussamad Samadani | IUML |
| Malappuram | 47 | Thavanur | K.T. Jaleel | Independent |
| Malappuram | 48 | Ponnani | P. Sreeramakrishnan | CPI(M) |
| Palakkad | 49 | Thrithala | V. T. Balram | INC |
| Palakkad | 50 | Pattambi | C. P. Mohammed | INC |
| Palakkad | 51 | Shornur | K. S. Saleekha | CPI(M) |
| Palakkad | 52 | Ottapalam | M. Hamsa | CPI(M) |
| Palakkad | 53 | Kongad | K. V. Vijayadas | CPI(M) |
| Palakkad | 54 | Mannarkkad | N. Samsudheen | IUML |
| Palakkad | 55 | Malampuzha | V. S. Achuthanandan | CPI(M) |
| Palakkad | 56 | Palakkad | Shafi Parambil | INC |
| Palakkad | 57 | Tarur | A. K. Balan | CPI(M) |
| Palakkad | 58 | Chittur | K. Achuthan | INC |
| Palakkad | 59 | Nenmara | V. Chenthamarakshan | CPI(M) |
| Palakkad | 60 | Alathur | M. Chandran | CPI(M) |
| Thrissur | 61 | Chelakkara | K. Radhakrishnan | CPI(M) |
| Thrissur | 62 | Kunnamkulam | Babu M. Palissery | CPI(M) |
| Thrissur | 63 | Guruvayur | K. V. Abdul Khader | CPI(M) |
| Thrissur | 64 | Manalur | P. A. Madhavan | INC |
| Thrissur | 65 | Wadakkanchery | C. N. Balakrishnan | INC |
| Thrissur | 66 | Ollur | M. P. Vincent | INC |
| Thrissur | 67 | Thrissur | Therambil Ramakrishnan | INC |
| Thrissur | 68 | Nattika | Geetha Gopi | CPI |
| Thrissur | 69 | Kaipamangalam | V. S. Sunil Kumar | CPI |
| Thrissur | 70 | Irinjalakuda | Thomas Unniyadan | KC(M) |
| Thrissur | 71 | Puthukkad | C. Raveendranath | CPI(M) |
| Thrissur | 72 | Chalakudy | B. D. Devassy | CPI(M) |
| Thrissur | 73 | Kodungallur | T N Prathapan | INC |
| Ernakulam | 74 | Perumbavoor | Saju Paul | CPI(M) |
| Ernakulam | 75 | Angamaly | Jose Thettayil | JD(S) |
| Ernakulam | 76 | Aluva | Anwar Sadath | INC |
| Ernakulam | 77 | Kalamassery | V. K. Ibrahimkunju | IUML |
| Ernakulam | 78 | Paravur | V. D. Satheesan | INC |
| Ernakulam | 79 | Vypen | S. Sharma | CPI(M) |
| Ernakulam | 80 | Kochi | Dominic Presentation | INC |
| Ernakulam | 81 | Thrippunithura | K. Babu | INC |
| Ernakulam | 82 | Ernakulam | Hibi Eden | INC |
| Ernakulam | 83 | Thrikkakara | Benny Behanan | INC |
| Ernakulam | 84 | Kunnathunad (SC) | V.P. Sajeendran | INC |
| Ernakulam | 88 | Piravom | Anoop Jacob | KC(JACOB) |
| Ernakulam | 86 | Muvattupuzha | Joseph Vazhakkan | INC |
| Ernakulam | 87 | Kothamangalam | T. U. Kuruvilla | KC(M) |
| Idukki | 88 | Devikulam | S. Rajendran | CPI(M) |
| Idukki | 89 | Udumbanchola | K. K. Jayachandran | CPI(M) |
| Idukki | 90 | Thodupuzha | P. J. Joseph | KC(M) |
| Idukki | 91 | Idukki | Roshy Augustine | KC(M) |
| Idukki | 92 | Peerumade | E. S. Bijimol | CPI |
| Kottayam | 93 | Pala | K. M. Mani | KC(M) |
| Kottayam | 94 | Kaduthuruthy | Monce Joseph | KC(M) |
| Kottayam | 95 | Vaikom | K. Ajith | CPI |
| Kottayam | 96 | Ettumanoor | K. Suresh Kurup | CPI(M) |
| Kottayam | 97 | Kottayam | Thiruvanchoor Radhakrishnan | INC |
| Kottayam | 98 | Puthuppally | Oommen Chandy | INC |
| Kottayam | 99 | Changanassery | C. F. Thomas | KC(M) |
| Kottayam | 100 | Kanjirappally | N. Jayaraj | KC(M) |
| Kottayam | 101 | Poonjar | P. C. George | KC(M)(Rebel) |
| Alappuzha | 102 | Aroor | A. M. Ariff | CPI(M) |
| Alappuzha | 103 | Cherthala | P. Thilothaman | CPI |
| Alappuzha | 104 | Alappuzha | Thomas Isaac | CPI(M) |
| Alappuzha | 105 | Ambalappuzha | G. Sudhakaran | CPI(M) |
| Alappuzha | 106 | Kuttanad | Thomas Chandy | NCP |
| Alappuzha | 107 | Haripad | Ramesh Chennithala | INC |
| Alappuzha | 108 | Kayamkulam | C. K. Sadasivan | CPI(M) |
| Alappuzha | 109 | Mavelikara | R. Rajesh | CPI(M) |
| Alappuzha | 110 | Chengannur | P. C. Vishnunath | INC |
| Pathanamthitta | 111 | Thiruvalla | Mathew T. Thomas | JD(S) |
| Pathanamthitta | 112 | Ranni | Raju Abraham | CPI(M) |
| Pathanamthitta | 113 | Aranmula | K. Sivadasan Nair | INC |
| Pathanamthitta | 114 | Konni | Adoor Prakash | INC |
| Pathanamthitta | 115 | Adoor | Chittayam Gopakumar | CPI |
| Kollam | 116 | Karunagappally | C. Divakaran | CPI |
| Kollam | 117 | Chavara | Shibu Baby John | RSP(B) |
| Kollam | 118 | Kunnathur | Kovoor Kunjumon | RSP |
| Kollam | 119 | Kottarakkara | P. Aisha Potty | CPI(M) |
| Kollam | 120 | Pathanapuram | K. B. Ganesh Kumar | KC(B) |
| Kollam | 121 | Punalur | K. Raju | CPI |
| Kollam | 122 | Chadayamangalam | Mullakara Ratnakaran | CPI |
| Kollam | 123 | Kundara | M. A. Baby | CPI(M) |
| Kollam | 124 | Kollam | P. K. Gurudasan | CPI(M) |
| Kollam | 125 | Eravipuram | A. A. Azeez | RSP |
| Kollam | 126 | Chathannoor | G.S. Jayalal | CPI |
| Thiruvananthapuram | 127 | Varkala | Varkala Kahar | INC |
| Thiruvananthapuram | 128 | Attingal | B. Satyan | CPI(M) |
| Thiruvananthapuram | 129 | Chirayinkeezhu | V. Sasi | CPI |
| Thiruvananthapuram | 130 | Nedumangad | Palode Ravi | INC |
| Thiruvananthapuram | 131 | Vamanapuram | Koliyakkode Krishnan Nair | CPI(M) |
| Thiruvananthapuram | 132 | Kazhakoottam | M. A. Wahid | INC |
| Thiruvananthapuram | 133 | Vattiyoorkavu | K. Muraleedharan | INC |
| Thiruvananthapuram | 134 | Thiruvananthapuram | V. S. Sivakumar | INC |
| Thiruvananthapuram | 135 | Nemom | V. Sivankutty | CPI(M) |
| Thiruvananthapuram | 136 | Aruvikkara | K. S. Sabarinathan | INC |
| Thiruvananthapuram | 137 | Parassala | A. T. George | INC |
| Thiruvananthapuram | 138 | Kattakkada | N. Sakthan | INC |
| Thiruvananthapuram | 139 | Kovalam | Jameela Prakasam | JD(S) |
| Thiruvananthapuram | 140 | Neyyattinkara | R. Selvaraj | INC |

=== Nominated member ===
A single seat in the Kerala Legislative Assembly was reserved for the members of the Anglo-Indian community by the Governor of Kerala on the advice of the Government of Kerala. The member nominated in this assembly was Ludy Luiz.

== See also ==
- Kerala Legislative Assembly election, 2011
