= 2011 Kerala Legislative Assembly election =

- 13 April 2011

All 140 seats in the Kerala Legislative Assembly 71 seats needed for a majority
- Turnout: 75.26% (▲3.18 pp)
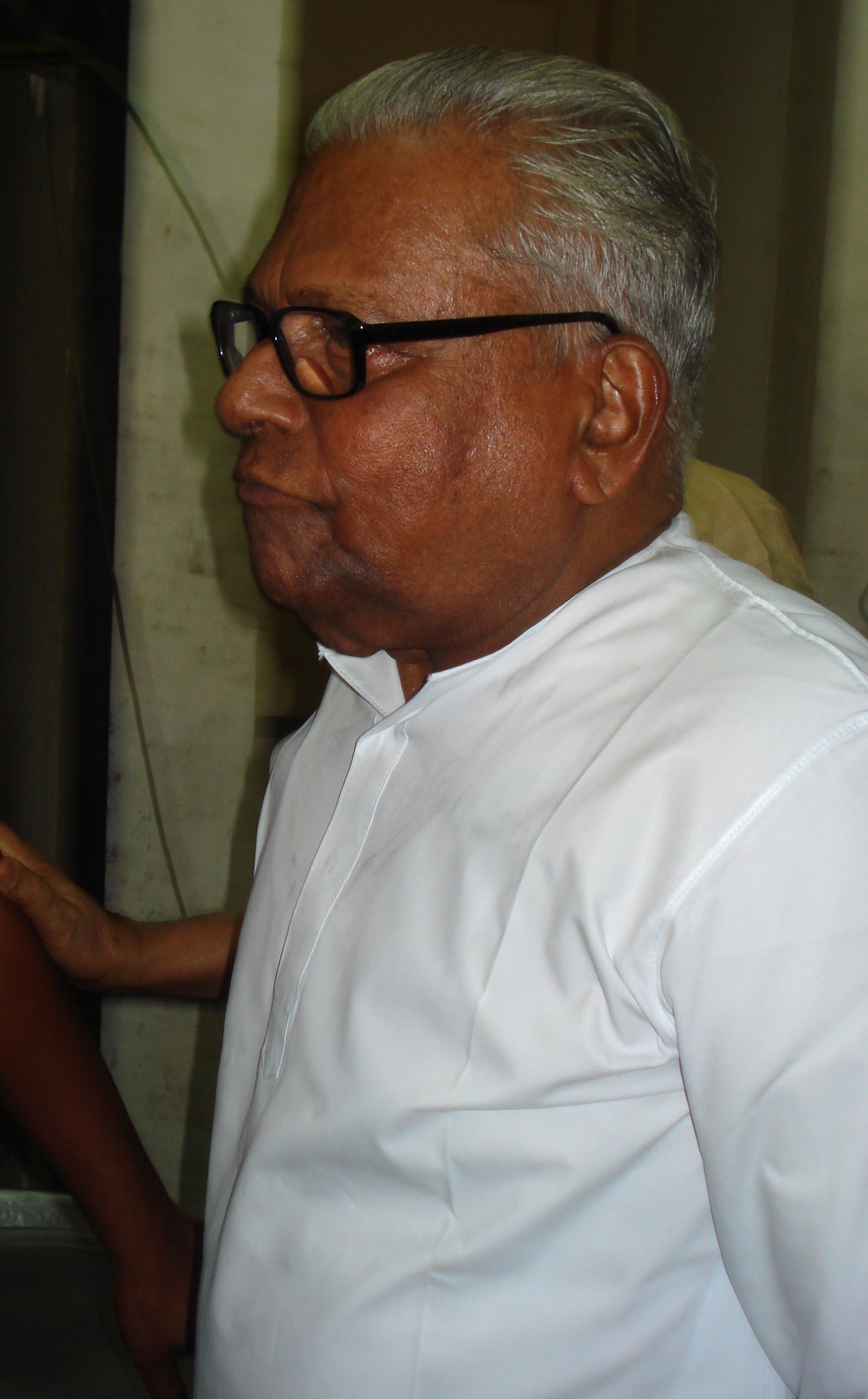

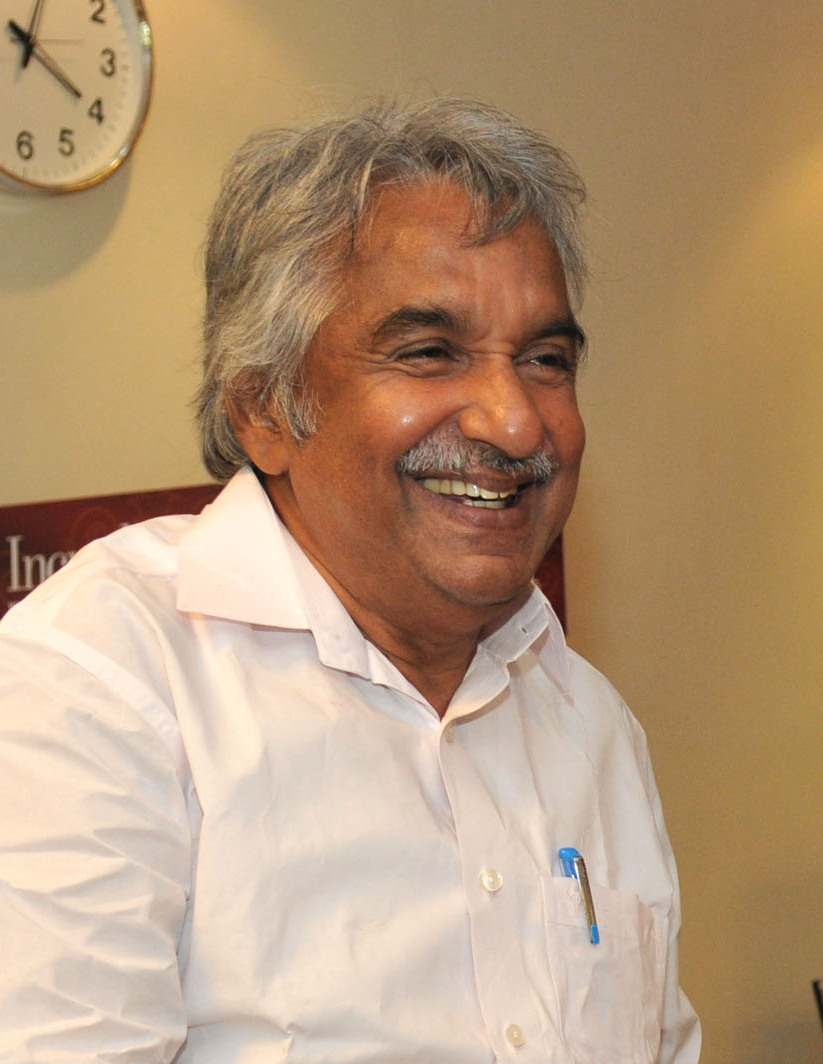
	First party	Second party
Leader	V S Achuthanandan	Oommen Chandy
Party	CPI(M)	INC
Alliance	LDF	UDF
Leader since	1996	31 August 2004
Leader's seat	Malampuzha (won)	Puthuppally (won)
Last election	30.45%, 98 seats	24.09%, 42 seats
Seats won	45	38
Popular vote	4,921,354	4,667,520
Percentage	28.18%	26.73%
Swing	▲14.49 pp	▲21.74 pp
Alliance seats	68	72
Alliance vote	7,846,703	8,002,874

Chief Minister before election
V. S. Achuthanandan
CPI(M)
Elected Chief Minister
Oommen Chandy
INC

Election map (By constituencies)

2011 Kerala Legislative Assembly election was held on 13 April 2011 to elect members representing 140 constituencies in Kerala. Election results were released on 13 May 2011. The election proved to be one of the closest ones in Kerala's history, with the United Democratic Front (UDF) defeating the Left Democratic Front (LDF) by a margin of 4 seats.

Oommen Chandy was sworn in as the Chief Minister for the second time on 18 May 2011.

== Parties and coalitions ==
There are three major political coalitions in Kerala. The United Democratic Front (UDF) is the coalition of centrist and centre-left parties led by the Indian National Congress. The Left Democratic Front (LDF) is the coalition of leftwing and far-left parties, led by the Communist Party of India (Marxist) (CPI-M). The right-wing Bharatiya Janata Party (BJP) is also contested in the state and fielded candidates in 139 constituencies, with one seat to their NDA alliance partner Janata Dal (United).

Common election symbols are provided only to national parties and registered recognized state parties. Registered unrecognized parties are given free symbols as per availability, based on request.

The official constituency-wise list of candidates with their election symbols

== Seat allotment ==
=== United Democratic Front (Kerala) ===
United Democratic Front (Kerala)

Party	Flag	Symbol	Leader	Contesting seats
Indian National Congress (Indira)			Oommen Chandy	81
Muslim League Kerala State Committee (Note: Indian Union Muslim League contested the elections as Muslim League Kerala State Committee.)			E. Ahamed	23
Kerala Congress (Mani)			K. M. Mani	15
Socialist Janata (Democratic) Party (Note: SJ(D) Contested both Television and Ring symbol each on 3 constituencies.)			M. P. Veerendra Kumar	6
Janathipathiya Samrakshana Samithy			K. R. Gouri Amma	4
Kerala Congress (Jacob) (Note: KEC(J) Contested both Television on 1 and Sewing machine symbol on 2 constituencies respectively.)			T. M. Jacob	3
Communist Marxist Party				2
Kerala Congress (B)			R. Balakrishna Pillai	2
Revolutionary Socialist Party (Baby John)			Shibu Baby John	1
UDF-Independents				3
Total				140

=== Left Democratic Front (Kerala) ===
Left Democratic Front (Kerala)

Party	Flag	Symbol	Leader	Contesting seats
Communist Party of India (Marxist)			V. S. Achuthanandan	84
Communist Party of India			A. B. Bardhan	27
Janata Dal (Secular)		Janata Dal Election Symbol	Mathew T. Thomas	5
Revolutionary Socialist Party				4
Nationalist Congress Party			Sharad Pawar	4
Indian National League				2
Kerala Congress (Anti-merger Group)				2
Congress (Secular) (Note: Congress (Secular) candidate Kadannappalli Ramachandran contested as Independent with support of LDF)			Kadannappalli Ramachandran	1
LDF-Independents				11
Total				140

=== National Democratic Alliance ===
National Democratic Alliance

Party	Flag	Symbol	Leader	Contesting seats
Bharatiya Janata Party			V. Muraleedharan	138
Janata Dal (United)			Nitish Kumar	1
Total				139

=== Parties not in any coalition ===
Party	Flag	Symbol	Leader	Contested seats
Bahujan Samaj Party			Mayawati Kumari	140
Social Democratic Party of India				84
Shiv Sena			Uddhav Thackeray	44
Socialist Unity Centre of India (Communist)			Provash Ghosh	26
All India Anna Dravida Munnetra Kazhagam			J. Jayalalithaa	6

== List of Candidates ==
Constituency		UDF		LDF		NDA	
#	Name	Party	Candidate	Party	Candidate	Party	Candidate
1	Manjeshwar	IUML	P. B. Abdul Razak	CPI(M)	C. H. Kunhambu	BJP	K. Surendran
2	Kasaragod	IUML	N. A. Nellikkunnu	INL	Azeez Kadappuram	BJP	Jayalakshmi N. Bhat
3	Udma	INC	C. K. Sreedharan	CPI(M)	K. Kunhiraman	BJP	Sunitha Prasanth
4	Kanhangad	INC	M. C. Jose	CPI	E. Chandrasekharan	BJP	Madikai Kammaran
5	Trikaripur	INC	K. V. Gangadharan	CPI(M)	K. Kunhiraman	BJP	T. Radhakrishnan
6	Payyannur	INC	K. Brijesh Kumar	CPI(M)	C. Krishnan	BJP	C. K. Ramesan Master
7	Kalliasseri	INC	P. Indira	CPI(M)	T. V. Rajesh	BJP	Sreekanth Ravi Varma
8	Taliparamba	KC(M)	Job Maichil	CPI(M)	James Mathew	BJP	K. Jayaprakash
9	Irikkur	INC	K. C. Joseph	CPI	P. Santhosh Kumar	BJP	M. G. Ramakrishnan Nair
10	Azhikode	IUML	K. M. Shaji	CPI(M)	M. Prakashan Master	BJP	M. K. Saseendran Master
11	Kannur	INC	A. P. Abdullakutty	IND	K. Ramachandran	BJP	U. T. Jayandan
12	Dharmadam	IND	Mambaram Divakaran	CPI(M)	K. K. Narayanan	BJP	C. P. Sangeetha
13	Thalassery	INC	Rijil Makkutty	CPI(M)	Kodiyeri Balakrishnan	BJP	V. Rathnakaran
14	Kuthuparamba	SJ(D)	K. P. Mohanan	IND	S. A. Puthiya Valappil	BJP	O. K. Vasu Master
15	Mattannur	SJ(D)	Joseph Chaavara	CPI(M)	E. P. Jayarajan	BJP	Biju Elakkuzhi
16	Peravoor	INC	Sunny Joseph	CPI(M)	K. K. Shailaja	BJP	P. K. Velayudhan
17	Mananthavady (ST)	INC	P. K. Jayalakshmi	CPI(M)	K. C. Kunhiraman	BJP	Irumuttoor Kunhaman
18	Sulthanbathery (ST)	INC	I. C. Balakrishnan	CPI(M)	E. A. Sankaran	BJP	Palliyara Raman
19	Kalpetta	SJ(D)	M. V. Shreyams Kumar	CPI(M)	P. A. Muhammed	BJP	P. G. Anand Kumar
20	Vadakara	SJ(D)	M. K. Premnath	JD(S)	C. K. Nanu	BJP	M. P. Rajan
21	Kuttiadi	IUML	Soopi Narikkatteri	CPI(M)	K. K. Lathika	BJP	V. K. Sajeevan
22	Nadapuram	INC	V. M. Chandran	CPI	E. K. Vijayan	BJP	Prakash Babu
23	Quilandy	INC	K. P. Anil Kumar	CPI(M)	K. Dasan	BJP	T. P. Jayachandran Master
24	Perambra	KC(M)	Mohammed Ikbal	CPI(M)	K. Kunhammad	BJP	P. Chandrika Teacher
25	Balusseri (SC)	INC	A. Balaram	CPI(M)	Purushan Kadalundy	BJP	T. K. Raman
26	Elathur	SJ(D)	Shaik P. Harriz	NCP	A. K. Saseendran	BJP	V. V. Rajan
27	Kozhikode North	INC	P. V. Gangadharan	CPI(M)	A. Pradeepkumar	BJP	P. Reghunath
28	Kozhikode South	IUML	M. K. Muneer	CPI(M)	C. P. Musafer Ahammed	BJP	Jaya Sadanandan
29	Beypore	INC	M. P. Adam Mulsi	CPI(M)	Elamaram Kareem	BJP	K. P. Sreesan
30	Kunnamangalam	IND	U. C. Raman	IND	P. T. A. Rahim	BJP	C. K. Padmanabhan
31	Koduvally	IUML	V. M. Ummer Master	CPI(M)	M. Mehaboob	BJP	Gireesh Thevally
32	Thiruvambady	IUML	C. Moyinkutty	CPI(M)	George M. Thomas	BJP	Jose Kappattmala
33	Kondotty	IUML	K. Muhammedunni Haji	CPI(M)	P. C. Naushad	BJP	Dr. Kumari Sukumaran
34	Eranad	IUML	P. K. Basheer	CPI	Ashrafali Kaliyath	BJP	K. P. Baburaj Master
35	Nilambur	INC	Aryadan Muhammed	IND	M. Thomas Mathew	BJP	K. C. Velayudhan
36	Wandoor (SC)	INC	A. P. Anil Kumar	CPI(M)	V. Ramesan	BJP	Kotheri Ayyappan
37	Manjeri	IUML	M. Ummer	CPI	P. Gouri	BJP	P. G. Upendran
38	Perinthalmanna	IUML	Manjalamkuzhi Ali	CPI(M)	Sasikumar	BJP	C. K. Kunhimuhammed
39	Mankada	IUML	T. A. Ahmed Kabir	CPI(M)	Kadeeja Sathar	BJP	K. Manikandan
40	Malappuram	IUML	P. Ubaidulla	JD(S)	Madathil Sadikali	BJP	K. Velayudhan
41	Vengara	IUML	P. K. Kunhalikutty	INL	K. P. Ismayil	BJP	Subrahmanian
42	Vallikkunnu	IUML	K. N. A. Khader	IND	K. V. Sankaranarayanan	BJP	Preman Master
43	Tirurangadi	IUML	P. K. Abdu Rabb	CPI	K. K. Abdu Samad	BJP	Sasidharan Punnassery
44	Tanur	IUML	Abdurahiman Randathani	CPI(M)	E. Jayan	BJP	Ravi Thelath
45	Tirur	IUML	C. Mammutty	CPI(M)	P. P. Abdullakutty	BJP	P. T. Ali Haji
46	Kottakkal	IUML	Abdussamad Samadani	NCP	C. P. K. Gurukkal	BJP	K. K. Surendran
47	Thavanur	INC	V. V. Prakash	IND	K. T. Jaleel	BJP	Nirmala K. Punnakkal
48	Ponnani	INC	P. T. Ajay Mohan	CPI(M)	P. Sreeramakrishnan	BJP	V. T. Jayaprakash Master
49	Thrithala	INC	V. T. Balram	CPI(M)	P. Mammikutty	BJP	V. Ramankutty
50	Pattambi	INC	C. P. Mohammed	CPI	K. P. Suresh Raj	BJP	Pookkattiri Babu
51	Shornur	INC	Santha Jayaram	CPI(M)	K. S. Saleekha	BJP	V. B. Muralidharan
52	Ottapalam	INC	V. K. Sreekandan	CPI(M)	M. Hamsa	BJP	P. Venugopalan
53	Kongad (SC)	INC	P. Swaminathan	CPI(M)	K. V. Vijayadas	BJP	V. Devayani
54	Mannarkkad	IUML	N. Samsudheen	CPI	V. Chamunni	BJP	O. P. Vasudevanunni
55	Malampuzha	INC	Lathika Subhash	CPI(M)	V. S. Achuthanandan	JD(U)	P. K. Majeed Pedikkatt
56	Palakkad	INC	Shafi Parambil	CPI(M)	K. K. Divakaran	BJP	C. Udaybhaskar
57	Tarur (SC)	KC(J)	N. Vinesh	CPI(M)	A. K. Balan	BJP	M. Lakshmanan
58	Chittur	INC	K. Achuthan	CPI(M)	S. Subhash Chandrabose	BJP	A. K. Omanakuttan
59	Nenmara	CMP	M. V. Raghavan	CPI(M)	V. Chenthamarakshan	BJP	N. Sivarajan
60	Alathur	KC(M)	K. Kusala Kumar	CPI(M)	M. Chandran	BJP	K. A. Sulaiman
61	Chelakkara (SC)	INC	K. B. Sasikumar	CPI(M)	K. Radhakrishnan	BJP	V. A. Krishnakumaran
62	Kunnamkulam	CMP	C. P. John	CPI(M)	Babu M. Palissery	BJP	K. K. Aneeshkumar
63	Guruvayoor	IUML	Asharaf Kokkur	CPI(M)	K. V. Abdul Khader	BJP	Dayanandan Mampully
64	Manalur	INC	P. A. Madhavan	CPI(M)	Baby John	BJP	P. M. Gopinathan
65	Wadakkanchery	INC	C. N. Balakrishnan	CPI(M)	N. R. Balan	BJP	Shajumon Vattekad
66	Ollur	INC	M. P. Vincent	CPI	Rajaji M. Thomas	BJP	Sundararajan Master
67	Thrissur	INC	Th. Ramakrishnan	CPI	P. Balachandran	BJP	Ravikumar Uppath
68	Nattika (SC)	IND	Vikas Chakrapani	CPI	Geetha Gopi	BJP	Sarju Thoyakkavu
69	Kaipamangalam	JSS	Umesh Challiyil	CPI	V. S. Sunil Kumar	BJP	A. N. Radhakrishnan
70	Irinjalakkuda	KC(M)	Thomas Unniyadan	CPI(M)	K. R. Vijaya	BJP	K. C. Venu Master
71	Puthukkad	INC	K. P. Viswanathan	CPI(M)	C. Raveendranath	BJP	Sobha Surendran
72	Chalakkudy	INC	K. T. Benny	CPI(M)	B. D. Devassy	BJP	Sudheer Baby
73	Kodungallur	INC	T. N. Prathapan	CPI	K. G. Sivanandhan	BJP	I. R. Vijayan
74	Perumbavoor	INC	Jaison Joseph	CPI(M)	Saju Paul	BJP	O. C. Asokan
75	Angamaly	KC(J)	Johny Nelloor	JD(S)	Jose Thettayil	BJP	M. A. Brahmaraj
76	Aluva	INC	Anwar Sadath	CPI(M)	A. M. Yousaf	BJP	M. N. Gopi
77	Kalamassery	IUML	V. K. Ebrahimkunju	CPI(M)	K. Chandran Pillai	BJP	P. Krishnadas
78	Paravur	INC	V. D. Satheesan	CPI	Pannian Ravindran	BJP	E. S. Purushothaman
79	Vypen	INC	Ajay Tharayil	CPI(M)	S. Sharma	BJP	T. G. Surendran
80	Kochi	INC	Dominic Presentation	CPI(M)	M. C. Josephine	BJP	K. Sasidharan Master
81	Thripunithura	INC	K. Babu	CPI(M)	C. M. Dinesh Mani	BJP	Sabu Vargheese
82	Eranakulam	INC	Hibi Eden	IND	Sebastian Paul	BJP	C. G. Rajagopal
83	Thrikkakara	INC	Benny Behanan	CPI(M)	M. E. Hassainar	BJP	N. Saji Kumar
84	Kunnathunad (SC)	INC	V. P. Sajeendran	CPI(M)	M. A. Surendran	BJP	M. Ravi
85	Piravom	KC(J)	T. M. Jacob	CPI(M)	M. J. Jacob	BJP	M. N. Madhu
86	Muvattupuzha	INC	Joseph Vazhackan	CPI	Babu Paul	BJP	Jiji Joseph
87	Kothamangalam	KC(M)	T. U. Kuruvilla	IND	Skariah Thomas	BJP	K. Radhakrishnan
88	Devikulam (SC)	INC	A. K. Moni	CPI(M)	S. Rajendran	BJP	S. Rajagopal
89	Udumbanchola	INC	Jossy Sebastian	CPI(M)	K. K. Jayachandran	BJP	Narayana Raju
90	Thodupuzha	KC(M)	P. J. Joseph	IND	Joseph Augustine	BJP	P. M. Velayudhan
91	Idukki	KC(M)	Roshy Augustine	CPI(M)	C. V. Varghese	BJP	C. C. Krishnan
92	Peerumade	INC	E. M. Augusthy	CPI	E. S. Bijimol	BJP	P. P. Sanu
93	Pala	KC(M)	K. M. Mani	NCP	Mani C. Kappan	BJP	B. Vijayakumar
94	Kaduthuruthy	KC(M)	Mons Joseph	KC(AMG)	Stephen George	BJP	P. G. Bijukumar
95	Vaikom (SC)	INC	A. Saneeshkumar	CPI	K. Ajith	BJP	Ramesh Kavimattam
96	Ettumanoor	KC(M)	Thomas Chazhikadan	CPI(M)	K. Suresh Kurup	BJP	V. G. Gopakumar
97	Kottayam	INC	T. Radhakrishnan	CPI(M)	V. N. Vasavan	BJP	Narayanan Namboothiri
98	Puthuppally	INC	Oommen Chandy	CPI(M)	Suja Susan George	BJP	P. Sunilkumar
99	Changanassery	KC(M)	C. F. Thomas	CPI(M)	B. Ekbal	BJP	M. B. Rajagopal
100	Kanjirappally	KC(M)	N. Jayaraj	CPI	Suresh T. Nair	BJP	Rajamohan
101	Poonjar	KC(M)	P. C. George	IND	Mohan Thomas	BJP	K. M. Santhoshkumar
102	Aroor	INC	A. A. Shukoor	CPI(M)	A. M. Ariff	BJP	T. Sajeev Lal
103	Cherthala	JSS	K. R. Gouri Amma	CPI	P. Thilothaman	BJP	P. K. Binoy
104	Alappuzha	INC	P. J. Mathew	CPI(M)	T. M. Thomas Isaac	BJP	Kottaram Unnikrishnan
105	Ambalapuzha	INC	M. Liju	CPI(M)	G. Sudhakaran	BJP	P. K. Vasudevan
106	Kuttanad	KC(M)	K. C. Joseph	NCP	Thomas Chandy	BJP	K. Soman
107	Haripad	INC	Ramesh Chennithala	CPI	G. Krishnaprasad	BJP	Ajith Sankar
108	Kayamkulam	INC	M. Murali	CPI(M)	C. K. Sadasivan	BJP	T. O. Noushad
109	Mavelikara (SC)	JSS	K. K. Shaju	CPI(M)	R. Rajesh	BJP	S. Girija
110	Chengannur	INC	P. C. Vishnunadh	CPI(M)	C. S. Sujatha	BJP	B. Radhakrishna Menon
111	Thiruvalla	KC(M)	Victor T. Thomas	JD(S)	Mathew T. Thomas	BJP	Rajan Moolaveettil
112	Ranni	INC	Peelipose Thomas	CPI(M)	Raju Abraham	BJP	Suresh Kadambari
113	Aranmula	INC	K. Sivadasan Nair	CPI(M)	K. C. Rajagopalan	BJP	K. Haridas
114	Konni	INC	Adoor Prakash	CPI(M)	M. S. Rajendran	BJP	V. S. Harish Chandran
115	Adoor (SC)	INC	Pandalam Sudhakaran	CPI	Chittayam Gopakumar	BJP	K. K. Sasi
116	Karunagappally	JSS	A. N. Rajan Babu	CPI	C. Divakaran	BJP	Malumel Suresh
117	Chavara	KRSP	Shibu Baby John	RSP	N. K. Premachandran	BJP	Nalini Sankaramangalam
118	Kunnathur (SC)	INC	P. K. Ravi	RSP	Kovoor Kunjumon	BJP	Raji Prasad
119	Kottarakkara	KC(B)	N. N. Murali	CPI(M)	P. Aisha Potty	BJP	Vayakkal Madhu
120	Pathanapuram	KC(B)	K. B. Ganesh Kumar	CPI(M)	K. Rajagopal	BJP	R. Subhash Pattazhy
121	Punalur	INC	Johnson Abraham	CPI	K. Raju	BJP	B. Radhamani
122	Chadayamangalam	INC	Shahida Kamal	CPI	Mullakkara Retnakaran	BJP	T. C. Saju Kumar
123	Kundara	INC	P. Jermias	CPI(M)	M. A. Baby	BJP	Vellimon Dileep
124	Kollam	INC	K. C. Rajan	CPI(M)	P. K. Gurudasan	BJP	G. Hari
125	Eravipuram	IUML	P. K. K. Bava	RSP	A. A. Aziz	BJP	Pattathanam Babu
126	Chathannur	INC	Bindhu Krishna	CPI	G. S. Jayalal	BJP	Kizhakkanela Sudhakaran
127	Varkala	INC	Varkala Kahar	CPI(M)	A. A. Rahim	BJP	Elakaman Satheesan
128	Attingal (SC)	INC	Thankamony Divakaran	CPI(M)	B. Satyan	BJP	P. P. Vava
129	Chirayinkeezhu (SC)	INC	K. Vidyadharan	CPI	V. Sasi		
130	Nedumangad	INC	Palode Ravi	CPI	P. Ramachandran Nair	BJP	K. S. Anjana
131	Vamanapuram	INC	C. Mohanachandran	CPI(M)	K. N. Krishnan Nair	BJP	Karette Sivaprasad
132	Kazhakkoottam	INC	M. A. Vaheed	CPI(M)	C. Ajayakumar	BJP	Padmakumar
133	Vattiyoorkavu	INC	K. Muraleedharan	IND	Cherian Philip	BJP	V. V. Rajesh
134	Thiruvananthapuram	INC	V. S. Sivakumar	KC(AMG)	V. Surendran Pillai	BJP	B. K. Shekhar
135	Nemom	SJ(D)	Charupara Ravi	CPI(M)	V. Sivankutty	BJP	O. Rajagopal
136	Aruvikkara	INC	G. Karthikeyan	RSP	A. Sreedharan Nair	BJP	C. Sivankutty
137	Parassala	INC	A. T. George	CPI(M)	Anavoor Nagappan	BJP	S. Suresh
138	Kattakkada	INC	N. Sakthan	IND	M. V. Jayadali	BJP	P. K. Krishnadas
139	Kovalam	INC	George Mercier	JD(S)	Jameela Prakasam	BJP	Venganoor Satheesh
140	Neyyattinkara	INC	Thampanoor Ravi	CPI(M)	R. Selvaraj	BJP	Athiyannoor Sreekumar

== Constituencies ==
There are 140 constituencies in Kerala, spread over 14 districts, based on the Delimitation commission of 2002. Many constituencies present in the 2006 elections become non-existent and 24 new constituencies came into existence following the delimitation.

1. Kanhangad
2. Mattannur
3. Dharmadam
4. Kalliasseri
5. Elathur
6. Kuttiady
7. Eranad
8. Vallikkunnu
9. Kottakkal
10. Vengara
11. Thavanur
12. Kongad
13. Tarur
14. Shornur
15. Kaipamangalam
16. Puthukkad
17. Kalamassery
18. Kochi
19. Thrikkakara
20. Vattiyoorkavu
21. Aruvikkara
22. Nemom
23. Kattakkada
24. Thiruvananthapuram

Aranmula constituency in Pathanamathitta district is the only seat in the state that has over two lakh voters at 203,411. The constituency that has the second-highest number of voters is Sultan Battery in Wayanad district with over 196,078 voters, followed by Kunnathur in Kollam district with over 190,322 voters. Kozhikode South constituency has the fewest voters with 130,254, followed by Ernakulam with 133,398 and Tanur in Malappuram district with 136,183 voters respectively.

Female voters outnumber the male voters in 127 of the 140 assembly seats. The Aranmula constituency has the highest number of female voters in the state, followed by Adoor with 102,336 and Manalur with 102,300 females.

Peerumedu constituency has the most polling booths, with 195 booths.

Thiruvananthapuram district has the largest number of 100 candidates in the fray, the fewest, with 17 candidates, is in Wayanad.

Poonjar constituency has the maximum number of candidates, 13. The fewest candidates is 4, in the constituencies of Sulthanbathery, Alathur, Malampuzha and Kaduthuruthy.

== Campaign ==
=== Salient points ===
V. S. Achuthanandan started the LDF campaign in Malampuzha, Palakkad on 21 March 2011.

An Asianet News journalist was allegedly roughed up by P. Jayarajan, a senior legislator of Kerala's ruling Left Democratic Front after a chat show in Kannur.

The use of a helicopter by KPCC chief Ramesh Chennithala in poll campaign was criticised by LDF.

The Supreme Court upheld the Election Commission's order directing the state government to defer its decision to extend a scheme for providing rice at Rs. 2 per kg to all ration card holders that was announced on the eve of the assembly elections.

Former UDF M.L.A. Sobhana George who gave nomination to contest as an independent candidate from Chenganoor later withdrew her candidature. Janakeeya Vikasana Munnai leader M. R. Murali also withdrew his nomination from contesting polls in Shoranur.

=== UDF manifesto ===
The main promises in the UDF manifesto are:-

1. 36 lakh jobs for unemployed youth.
2. 25 kg of rice at Re one a kg rice for Below Poverty Line families and at Rs two per kg to others.
3. Farm loans at three percent interest.
4. Free bicycles to class X students.
5. Setting up of pepper and horticulture boards.
6. Back-door appointments to be reconsidered.
7. Interest-free loans for purchasing computers and motorbikes for students.
8. Making Kochi Metro project a reality.
9. Ensuring electricity connections to all households within one year.
10. Exploitation by operators of other state lotteries to be stopped.

=== LDF manifesto ===
The main promises in the LDF manifesto are:-

1. Increase old age pension from Rs 400 to Rs 1000.
2. Creation of 25 lakh jobs in non-farm sectors and increasing the state spending on infrastructure projects.
3. A subsidy of Rs 20 per litre for kerosene for the weaker sections.
4. Several sops for women and children with various empowerment schemes totalling Rs 7500 crore.
5. The maternity leave with the wage for women working in the unorganized sector would be increased to three months from the present one month.
6. All the school children would be given a free meal, uniforms, and textbooks.
7. A welfare-cum-pension scheme for employees of places of worship of all religions will be introduced.
8. The operations of other-state lotteries would be contained while protecting the Kerala state lottery.
9. Total electrification of the state in six months.
10. Cent percent drinking water supply in five years.

== Poll surveys ==
Pre-poll surveys
When conducted	Ref.	Polling organisation or agency	LDF	UDF	OTH
9 March 2011		Asianet News	60 – 68	72 -80	0 – 5
31 March 2011		Asianet News	50 – 60	80 – 90	0 – 2
31 March 2011		Institute for Monitoring Economic Growth	58 – 68	72 – 82	-
1 April 2011		Mail Today-India Today-Headlines Today-Aaj Tak-ORG	41	96	3

Post-poll surveys
When conducted	Ref.	Polling organisation or agency	LDF	UDF	OTH
10 May 2011		Centre for Study of Developing Societies (CSDS)	69 – 77	63 – 71	-
10 May 2011		Centre for Forecasting and Research (C-fore)	58 – 68	72 – 82	0 – 2
10 May 2011		Headlines Today-ORG	48 – 55	85 – 92	-
		STAR News	49	88	-
		Jai Hind TV channel	44 – 54	86 – 96	-
		News24 channel -Today's Chanakya Agency	84 – 102	35 – 53	0 – 6
		CVB News-C-Voter	49 – 57	83 – 91	1 – 4

== Election ==
The thirteenth legislative assembly election was held on 13 April 2011. The filing of nominations for the elections ended on 26 March 2011. A total of 1373 contestants filed nominations. The scrutiny of nominations took place on 29 March 2011. According to the latest revised electoral list, there are a total of 22,878,767 voters, with 11,919,652 women and 10,959,115 men. There are 20,758 polling booths in 11,662 polling locations in the state.

A total of 971 candidates contested the elections, after the withdrawal of nominations closed.

=== Voting ===
The polling to elect members of the assembly from the 140 constituencies in Kerala was held successfully on 13 April 2011. 75.12 percent of voter turnout was recorded in the state. The district-wise and constituency-wise polling percentage is as given below.

Sl. No:	Constituency	No. of voters	Polling stations	Percentage of polling
Kasaragod				76.3%
1	Manjeshwar	176801	160	75.1%
2	Kasargod	159251	140	73.6%
3	Udma	173441	152	74.0%
4	Kanhangad	177812	158	78.4%
5	Trikaripur	169019	162	80.4%
Kannur				80.7%
6	Payyannur	157667	151	82.3%
7	Kalliasseri	156598	148	79.4%
8	Taliparamba	173593	161	82.7%
9	Irikkur	168376	163	77.3%
10	Azhikode	147413	128	82.2%
11	Kannur	143181	122	78.7%
12	Dharmadam	162161	139	83.4%
13	Thalassery	149174	144	78.6%
14	Kuthuparamba	160026	147	79.7%
15	Mattannur	159815	146	82.7%
16	Peravoor	145437	126	80.0%
Wayanad				73.8%
17	Mananthavady (ST)	166823	134	74.2%
18	Sulthanbathery (ST)	198272	179	73.2%
19	Kalpetta	170042	137	75.0%
Kozhikode				81.3%
20	Vadakara	141290	137	80.5%
21	Kuttiady	162140	140	87.2%
22	Nadapuram	179213	160	81.4%
23	Koyilandy	165945	141	81.6%
24	Perambra	159050	145	84.3%
25	Balusseri (SC)	183851	161	81.5%
26	Elathur	161999	137	82.0%
27	Kozhikode North	149890	134	77.1%
28	Kozhikode South	132621	128	77.9%
29	Beypore	163840	131	78.7%
30	Kunnamangalam	177622	140	84.0%
31	Koduvally	142154	121	79.7%
32	Thiruvambadi	145446	127	79.1%
Malappuram				74.6%
33	Kondotty	157911	131	77.5%
34	Ernad	141704	125	80.4%
35	Nilambur	174633	151	77.8%
36	Wandoor (SC)	180536	158	73.3%
37	Manjeri	164036	136	71.0%
38	Perinthalmanna	164998	143	81.3%
39	Mankada	164006	131	73.6%
40	Malappuram	167667	143	72.6%
41	Vengara	144304	118	68.9%
42	Vallikunnu	156165	123	72.2%
43	Tirurangadi	152828	124	65.5%
44	Tanur	138051	110	75.3%
45	Tirur	166273	142	75.9%
46	Kottakkal	167435	132	70.5%
47	Thavanur	156189	124	78.1%
48	Ponnani	158627	141	76.2%
Palakkad				75.6%
49	Thrithala	155363	127	78.4%
50	Pattambi	153467	122	76.5%
51	Shornur	163390	141	73.4%
52	Ottappalam	174363	152	75.0%
53	Kongad (SC)	155410	134	72.7%
54	Mannarkkad	166126	141	72.7%
55	Malampuzha	180267	150	75.2%
56	Palakkad	154101	134	72.6%
57	Tarur (SC)	148716	131	75.3%
58	Chittur	167503	143	81.0%
59	Nemmara	171567	159	77.9%
60	Alathur	152355	131	76.1%
Thrissur				74.9%
61	Chelakkara (SC)	173352	147	76.6%
62	Kunnamkulam	173993	155	75.3%
63	Guruvayoor	178107	150	71.9%
64	Manalur	189796	169	73.3%
65	Wadakkanchery	177837	149	77.9%
66	Ollur	176637	145	73.8%
67	Thrissur	161697	135	68.7%
68	Nattika (SC)	179470	148	71.4%
69	Kaipamangalam	151281	135	77.2%
70	Irinjalakuda	174061	151	75.8%
71	Puthukkad	175850	155	78.0%
72	Chalakudy	172486	157	76.2%
73	Kodungallur	168902	156	75.9%
Ernakulam				77.6%
74	Perumbavoor	154283	153	81.1%
75	Angamaly	152250	144	80.7%
76	Aluva	158819	144	80.3%
77	Kalamassery	164999	144	79.3%
78	Paravur	170940	154	84.0%
79	Vypin	151879	138	79.3%
80	Kochi	157604	148	66.9%
81	Thripunithura	171429	157	76.3%
82	Ernakulam	135512	122	71.6%
83	Thrikkakara	159701	139	73.6%
84	Kunnathunad (SC)	152939	171	83.4%
88	Piravom	175995	134	79.1%
86	Muvattupuzha	154304	125	74.9%
87	Kothamangalam	144146	136	74.1%
Idukki				71.1%
88	Devikulam (SC)	147765	170	72.3%
89	Udumbanchola	153386	157	71.9%
90	Thodupuzha	177341	181	71.6%
91	Idukki	169711	175	70.3%
92	Peerumade	165179	195	69.6%
Kottayam				73.8%
93	Pala	168981	170	73.4%
94	Kaduthuruthy	171075	166	72.0%
95	Vaikom (SC)	153205	148	78.7%
96	Ettumanoor	150427	154	78.2%
97	Kottayam	147990	158	77.4%
98	Puthuppally	157002	156	73.8%
99	Changanassery	148860	139	72.5%
100	Kanjirappally	161393	154	69.9%
101	Poonjar	167745	160	70.0%
Alappuzha				79.1%
102	Aroor	173906	159	84.0%
103	Cherthala	190467	166	84.7%
104	Alappuzha	173665	153	80.7%
105	Ambalappuzha	146369	130	79.3%
106	Kuttanad	149121	168	78.6%
107	Haripad	168698	181	79.5%
108	Kayamkulam	179130	179	77.6%
109	Mavelikkara (SC)	175720	179	75.8%
110	Chengannur	175610	154	71.2%
Pathanamthitta				68.2%
111	Thiruvalla	193159	163	65.4%
112	Ranni	175285	150	68.5%
113	Aranmula	205978	181	65.8%
114	Konni	181196	163	72.1%
115	Adoor (SC)	192721	170	69.8%
Kollam				72.8%
116	Karunagapally	181575	162	75.4%
117	Chavara	159260	134	79.1%
118	Kunnathur (SC)	193106	172	73.7%
119	Kottarakkara	183590	169	74.3%
120	Pathanapuram	172337	157	74.1%
121	Punalur	186470	179	71.2%
122	Chadayamangalam	177021	165	71.6%
123	Kundara	178050	152	71.2%
124	Kollam	160267	151	70.6%
125	Eravipuram	153383	136	67.9%
126	Chathannoor	160019	136	71.0%
Thiruvananthapuram				68.3%
127	Varkala	151613	154	72.5%
128	Attingal (SC)	171316	162	66.7%
129	Chirayinkeezhu (SC)	169784	172	66.1%
130	Nedumangad	174889	153	70.7%
131	Vamanapuram	173748	166	70.6%
132	Kazhakoottam	162600	137	66.9%
133	Vattiyoorkavu	174721	140	63.9%
134	Thiruvananthapuram	177098	148	60.2%
135	Nemom	171841	144	67.5%
136	Aruvikkara	164890	139	70.2%
137	Parassala	187565	166	71.0%
138	Kattakkada	165300	136	70.6%
139	Kovalam	183116	161	67.6%
140	Neyyattinkara	157004	140	70.7%
		23147871	2118	75.12%

Re-polling was conducted on two polling stations in the state on 16-April-2011, in the Legislative Assembly constituencies of Pattambi and Chalakkudy.

== Results ==
UDF Vs LDF results

The election resulted in a slender victory for the UDF coalition winning 72 out of the 140 assembly seats while the incumbent LDF garnered the remaining 68 seats. The UDF lead was further extended to 73 through the subsequent by-election in Neyyattinkara constituency in which the incumbent MLA, R. Selvaraj, resigned from LDF to join UDF and got re-elected.

=== Results ===
UDF	LDF	BJP
72	68	0

UDF (72)							LDF (68)					
38	20	9	2	1	1	1	45	13	4	2	2	2
INC	IUML	KC (M)	SJ (D)	KC (B)	KC (J)	RSP; B	CPI(M)	CPI	JDS	IND	NCP	RSP

=== By region ===
Region map of Kerala	Region	Seats		
Region map of Kerala	Region	Seats	UDF	LDF
	North Kerala	48	27	21
	Central Kerala	44	24	20
	South Kerala	48	21	27
	Total	140	72	68

=== By District ===
District map of Kerala	District	Seats		
District map of Kerala	District	Seats	UDF	LDF
	Kasaragod	5	2	3
	Kannur	11	5	6
	Wayanad	3	3	—N/a
	Kozhikode	13	3	10
	Malappuram	16	14	2
	Palakkad	12	5	7
	Thrissur	13	6	7
	Ernakulam	14	11	3
	Idukki	5	2	3
	Kottayam	9	7	2
	Alappuzha	9	2	7
	Pathanamthitta	5	2	3
	Kollam	11	2	9
	Trivandrum	14	8	6
	Total	140	72	68

=== Results by constituency ===
Constituency		Winner					Runner-up					Margin
No.	Name	Candidate	Party	Alliance	Votes	%	Candidate	Party	Alliance	Votes	%	Margin
Kasaragod district
1	Manjeshwar	P. B. Abdul Razak	IUML	UDF	49,817	37.46	K. Surendran	BJP	NDA	43,989	33.08	5,828
2	Kasaragod	N. A. Nellikkunnu	IUML	UDF	53,068	45.35	Jayalakshmi N. Bhatt	BJP	NDA	43,330	37.02	9,738
3	Udma	K. Kunhiraman	CPI(M)	LDF	61,646	47.93	C.K. Sreedharan	INC	UDF	50,266	39.08	11,380
4	Kanhangad	E. Chandrasekharan	CPI(M)	LDF	66,640	47.65	M.C. Jose	INC	UDF	54,462	38.95	12,178
5	Thrikaripur	K. Kunhiraman	CPI(M)	LDF	67,871	49.91	E. Gangadharan	INC	UDF	59,106	43.46	8,765
Kannur district
6	Payyanur	C. Krishnan	CPI(M)	LDF	78,116	59.78	K. Brijesh Kumar	INC	UDF	45,992	35.20	32,124
7	Kalliasseri	T. V. Rajesh	CPI(M)	LDF	73,190	58.62	P. Indira	INC	UDF	43,244	34.64	29,966
8	Taliparamba	James Mathew	CPI(M)	LDF	81,031	56.13	Job Michel	KC(M)	UDF	53,170	36.83	27,861
9	Irikkur	K. C. Joseph	INC	UDF	68,503	52.41	P. Santhosh Kumar	CPI	LDF	56,746	43.42	11,757
10	Azhikode	K. M. Shaji	IUML	UDF	55,077	45.21	M. Prakashan Master	CPI(M)	LDF	54,584	44.80	493
11	Kannur	A. P. Abdullakutty	INC	UDF	55,427	48.89	Ramchandran Kaddanappalli	IND	LDF	48,984	43.21	6,443
12	Dharmadam	K. K. Narayanan	CPI(M)	LDF	72,354	53.13	Mambaram Divakaran	INC	UDF	57,192	42.00	15,162
13	Thalassery	Kodiyeri Balakrishnan	CPI(M)	LDF	66,870	56.78	Rijil Makkutty	INC	UDF	40,361	34.27	26,509
14	Kuthuparamba	K. P. Mohanan	SJ(D)	UDF	57,164	44.68	S. A. Puthiya Valappil	IND	LDF	53,861	42.10	3,303
15	Mattanur	E. P. Jayarajan	CPI(M)	LDF	75,177	56.55	Joseph Chaavara	SJ(D)	UDF	44,665	33.60	30,512
16	Peravoor	Sunny Joseph	INC	UDF	56,151	48.07	K. K. Shailaja	CPI(M)	LDF	52,711	45.12	3,440
Wayanad district
17	Mananthavady (ST)	P. K. Jayalakshmi	INC	UDF	62,996	50.78	K. C. Kunhiraman	CPI(M)	LDF	50,262	40.52	12,734
18	Sulthan Bathery (ST)	I. C. Balakrishnan	INC	UDF	71,509	49.14	E. A. Sankaran	CPI(M)	LDF	63,926	43.93	7,583
19	Kalpetta	M. V. Shreyams Kumar	SJ(D)	UDF	67,018	53.94	P. A. Muhammed	CPI(M)	LDF	48,849	38.59	18,169
Kozhikode district
20	Vadakara	C. K. Nanu	JD(S)	LDF	46,912	41.05	M. K. Premnath	SJ(D)	UDF	46,065	40.31	847
21	Kuttiady	K. K. Lathika	CPI(M)	LDF	70,258	49.32	Soopi Nirakkatteri	IUML	UDF	63,286	44.93	6,972
22	Nadapuram	E. K. Vijayan	CPI	LDF	72,078	49.22	V. M. Chandran	INC	UDF	64,532	44.07	7,546
23	Quilandy	K. Dasan	CPI(M)	LDF	64,374	47.20	K. P. Anil Kumar	INC	UDF	60,235	44.16	4,139
24	Perambra	K. Kunhammad Master	CPI(M)	LDF	70,248	51.91	Mohammad Ikbal	KC(M)	UDF	54,979	40.62	15,269
25	Balussery (SC)	Purushan Kadalundi	CPI(M)	LDF	74,259	49.18	A. Balaram	INC	UDF	65,377	43.29	8,882
26	Elathur	A. K. Saseendran	NCP	LDF	67,143	50.14	Shaikh P. Harriz	SJ(D)	UDF	52,489	39.20	14,654
27	Kozhikode North	A. Pradeep Kumar	CPI(M)	LDF	57,123	49.12	P. V. Gangadharan	INC	UDF	48,125	41.38	8,998
28	Kozhikode South	M. K. Muneer	IUML	UDF	47,771	46.08	C. P. Musafer Ahamed	CPI(M)	LDF	46,395	44.75	1,376
29	Beypore	Elamaram Kareem	CPI(M)	LDF	60,550	46.80	Adam Mulsi M.P.	INC	UDF	55,234	42.69	5,316
30	Kunnamangalam	P. T. A. Rahim	IND	LDF	66,169	44.06	U. C. Raman	IND	UDF	62,900	41.68	3,269
31	Koduvally	V. M. Ummer Master	IUML	UDF	60,365	53.03	M. Mehboob	CPI(M)	LDF	43,813	38.49	16,652
32	Thiruvambady	C. Moyinkutty	IUML	UDF	56,388	48.71	George M. Thomas	CPI(M)	LDF	52,553	45.40	3,833
Malappuram district
33	Kondotty	K. Muhammedunni	IUML	UDF	67,998	56.82	P. C. Naushad	CPI(M)	LDF	39,849	33.30	28,149
34	Eranad	P. K. Basheer	IUML	UDF	58,698	51.29	P. V. Anvar	IND	LDF	47,452	41.47	11,246
35	Nilambur	Aryadan Mohammed	INC	UDF	66,339	48.64	M. Thomas Mathew	CPI(M)	LDF	60,733	44.54	5,598
36	Wandoor (SC)	A. P. Anil Kumar	INC	UDF	77,580	56.50	V. Ramesan	CPI(M)	LDF	48,661	36.69	28,919
37	Manjeri	M. Ummer	IUML	UDF	67,594	57.99	P. Gouri	CPI	LDF	38,515	33.05	29,079
38	Perinthalmanna	Manjalmkuzhi Ali	IUML	UDF	69,730	52.97	P. C. Naushad	CPI(M)	LDF	60,141	44.97	9,589
39	Mankada	T. A. Ahmed Kabeer	IUML	UDF	67,756	55.88	Kadeeja Sathar	CPI(M)	LDF	44,163	36.42	23,593
40	Malappuram	P. Ubaidulla	IUML	UDF	77,928	63.75	Madathil Saidkali	JD(S)	LDF	33,420	27.34	44,508
41	Vengara	P. K. Kunhalikutty	IUML	UDF	63,198	63.44	K. P. Ismayil	INL	LDF	24,901	25.02	38,297
42	Valikunnu	K. N. A. Khader	IUML	UDF	57,250	50.53	K. V. Sankaranarayanan	INL	LDF	39,128	34.53	18,122
43	Tirurangadi	P. K. Abdu Rabb	IUML	UDF	58,666	58.48	K. K. Abdu Samad	CPI	LDF	28,458	28.37	30,208
44	Tanur	Abdurahiman Randathani	IUML	UDF	51,549	49.52	E. Jayan	CPI(M)	LDF	42,116	40.45	9,433
45	Tirur	C. Mammootty	IUML	UDF	69,305	54.85	P. P. Abdullakutty	CPI(M)	LDF	45,739	36.20	23,566
46	Kottakkal	M. P. Abdussamad Samadani	IUML	UDF	69,717	58.91	C. P. K. Gurukkal	NCP	LDF	33,815	28.57	35,902
47	Thavanur	K. T. Jaleel	IND	LDF	57,229	44.06	V. V. Prakash	INC	UDF	50,875	41.68	6,347
48	Ponnani	P. Sreeramakrishnan	CPI(M)	LDF	57,615	47.55	P. T. Ajay Mohan	INC	UDF	53,514	44.17	4,101
Palakkad district
49	Thrithala	V. T. Balram	INC	UDF	57,848	47.37	Mammikutty P.	CPI(M)	LDF	54,651	44.75	3,197
50	Pattambi	C. P. Mohammed	INC	UDF	57,728	49.00	K. P. Suresh Raj	CPI	LDF	45,253	38.41	12,475
51	Shornur	K. S. Saleekha	CPI(M)	LDF	59,616	49.57	Santha Jayaram	INC	UDF	46,123	38.35	13,493
52	Ottapalam	M. Hamza	CPI(M)	LDF	65,020	49.47	V. K. Sreekandan	INC	UDF	51,820	39.43	13,200
53	Kongad (SC)	K. V. Vijayadas	CPI(M)	LDF	52,920	46.63	P. Swaminathan	INC	UDF	49,355	43.49	3,565
54	Mannarkkad	N. Samsudheen	IUML	UDF	60,191	49.66	V. Chamunni	CPI	LDF	51,921	42.84	8,270
55	Malampuzha	V. S. Achuthanandan	CPI(M)	LDF	77,752	57.04	Lathika Subhash	INC	UDF	54,312	39.84	23,440
56	Palakkad	Shafi Parambil	INC	UDF	47,631	42.41	K. K. Dinakaran	CPI(M)	LDF	40,238	35.82	7,393
57	Tarur (SC)	A. K. Balan	CPI(M)	LDF	64,175	57.15	N. Vinesh	KC(J)	UDF	38,419	34.21	25,756
58	Chittur	K. Achuthan	INC	UDF	69,916	51.33	S. Subhash Chandrabose	CPI(M)	LDF	57,586	42.28	12,330
59	Nenmara	V. Chentharamakrishnan	CPI(M)	LDF	64,169	47.86	M. V. Raghavan	CMP(J)	UDF	55,475	41.48	8,694
60	Alathur	M. Chandran	CPI(M)	LDF	66,977	57.72	K. Kusala Kumar	KC(M)	UDF	42,236	36.40	24,741
Thrissur district
61	Chelakkara (SC)	K. Radhakrishnan	CPI(M)	LDF	73,683	55.42	K. B. Sasikumar	INC	UDF	49,007	36.86	24,676
62	Kunnamkulam	Babu M. Palissery	CPI(M)	LDF	58,244	44.34	C. P. John	CMP(J)	UDF	57,763	43.98	481
63	Guruvayur	K. V. Abdul Khader	CPI(M)	LDF	62,246	48.53	Ashraf Kokkur	IUML	UDF	52,278	40.75	9,968
64	Manalur	P. A. Madhavan	INC	UDF	63,077	45.22	Baby John	CPI(M)	LDF	62,596	44.87	481
65	Wadakkanchery	C. N. Balakrishnan	INC	UDF	67,911	48.79	N. R. Balan	CPI(M)	LDF	61,226	43.99	6,685
66	Ollur	M. P. Vincent	INC	UDF	64,823	49.21	Rajaji Mathew Thomas	CPI	LDF	58,576	44.47	6,247
67	Thrissur	Therambil Ramakrishnan	INC	UDF	59,991	53.19	P. Balachandran	CPI	LDF	62,596	38.85	16,169
68	Nattika (SC)	Geetha Gopi	CPI	LDF	64,555	50.21	Vikas Chakrapani	IND	UDF	48,501	37.72	16,054
69	Kaipamangalam	V. S. Sunil Kumar	CPI	LDF	64,555	50.20	Umesh Challiyil	JPSS	UDF	45,259	38.61	13,570
70	Irinjalakuda	Thomas Unniyadan	KC(M)	UDF	68,441	51.70	K. R. Vijaya	CPI(M)	LDF	56,045	42.33	12,396
71	Puthukkad	C. Raveendranath	CPI(M)	LDF	73,047	52.84	K. P. Viswanathan	INC	UDF	46,565	33.68	26,482
72	Chalakudy	B. D. Devassy	CPI(M)	LDF	63,610	48.18	K. T. Benny	INC	UDF	61,061	46.25	2,549
73	Kodungallur	T. N. Prathapan	INC	UDF	64,495	50.11	K. G. Sivanandhan	CPI	LDF	55,063	42.78	9,432
Ernakulam district
74	Perumbavoor	Saju Paul	CPI(M)	LDF	59,628	47.42	Jaison Joseph	INC	UDF	56,246	44.73	3,382
75	Angamaly	Jose Thettayil	JD(S)	LDF	61,500	47.42	Johnny Nelloor	KC(J)	UDF	54,330	43.78	7,170
76	Aluva	Anwar Sadath	INC	UDF	64,244	50.24	N. R. Balan	CPI(M)	LDF	51,030	39.91	13,214
77	Kalamassery	V. K. Ebrahim Kunju	IUML	UDF	62,843	47.73	K. Chandran Pillai	CPI(M)	LDF	55,054	41.81	7,792
78	Paravur	V. D. Satheesan	INC	UDF	74,632	51.78	Pannyan Raveendran	CPI	LDF	63,283	43.91	11,349
79	Vypen	S. Sharma	CPI(M)	LDF	60,814	50.37	Ajay Tharayil	INC	UDF	55,572	46.03	5,242
80	Kochi	Dominic Presentation	INC	UDF	56,352	53.37	M. C. Josephine	CPI(M)	LDF	39,849	37.74	16,503
81	Thrippunithura	K. Babu	INC	UDF	69,886	53.37	C. M. Dinesh Mani	CPI(M)	LDF	54,108	41.31	15,778
82	Ernakulam	Hibi Eden	INC	UDF	59,919	61.58	Sebastian Paul	IND	LDF	27,482	28.25	32,487
83	Thrikkakara	Benny Behanan	INC	UDF	65,854	55.88	M. E. Hassainar	CPI(M)	LDF	43,448	36.87	22,406
84	Kunnathunad (SC)	V. P. Sajeendran	INC	UDF	63,624	49.72	M. A. Surendran	CPI(M)	LDF	54,892	42.89	8,732
85	Piravom	T. M. Jacob	KC(J)	UDF	66,503	47.53	M. J. Jacob	CPI(M)	LDF	66,346	47.41	157
86	Muvattupuzha	Joseph Vazhackkan	INC	UDF	58,012	49.90	Babu Paul	CPI	LDF	52,849	45.46	5,163
87	Kothamangalam	T. U. Kuruvilla	KC(M)	UDF	52,924	49.26	Skariah Thomas	IND	LDF	40,702	37.88	12,222
Idukki district
88	Devikulam (SC)	S. Rajendran	CPI(M)	LDF	51,849	48.43	A. K. Moni	INC	UDF	47,771	44.62	4,078
89	Udumbanchola	K. K. Jayachandran	CPI(M)	LDF	56,923	51.48	Jossy Sebastian	INC	UDF	47,090	42.59	9,833
90	Thodupuzha	P. J. Joseph	KC(M)	UDF	66,325	51.92	Skariah Thomas	IND	LDF	43,457	34.02	22,867
91	Idukki	Roshy Augustine	KC(M)	UDF	65,734	54.88	C. V. Varghese	CPI(M)	LDF	49,928	41.69	15,806
92	Peerumade	E. S. Bijimol	CPI	LDF	56,748	49.26	E. M. Augusthy	INC	UDF	51,971	45.11	4,777
Kottayam district
93	Pala	K. M. Mani	KC(M)	UDF	61,239	49.14	Mani C. Kappan	NCP	LDF	55,980	44.92	5,259
94	Kaduthurthy	Mons Joseph	KC(M)	UDF	68,787	56.37	Stephen George	KC(AMG)	LDF	45,730	37.48	23,057
95	Vaikom (SC)	K. Ajith	CPI	LDF	62,603	51.62	A. Saneeshkumar	INC	UDF	52,035	42.91	10,568
96	Ettumanoor	K. Suresh Kurup	CPI(M)	LDF	57,381	48.52	Thomas Chazhikadan	KC(M)	UDF	55,580	47.00	1,801
97	Kottayam	Thiruvanchoor Radhakrishnan	INC	UDF	53,825	46.84	V. N. Vasavan	CPI(M)	LDF	53,114	46.23	711
98	Puthuppally	Oommen Chandy	INC	UDF	69,922	59.74	Suja Susan George	CPI(M)	LDF	36,667	31.33	33,255
99	Changanassery	C. F. Thomas	KC(M)	UDF	51,019	47.13	B. Ekbal	CPI(M)	LDF	48,465	44.77	2,554
100	Kanjirappally	N. Jayaraj	KC(M)	UDF	57,021	50.40	Suresh T. Nair	CPI(M)	LDF	44,815	39.61	12,206
101	Poonjar	P. C. George	KC(M)	UDF	59,809	50.77	Mohan Thomas	IND	LDF	44,105	37.44	15,704
Alappuzha district
102	Aroor	A. M. Ariff	CPI(M)	LDF	76,675	52.28	A. A. Shukoor	INC	UDF	59,823	40.79	16,852
103	Cherthala	P. Thilothaman	CPI	LDF	86,193	53.11	K. R. Gouriamma	JPSS	UDF	67,878	41.83	18,315
104	Alappuzha	T. M. Thomas Issac	CPI(M)	LDF	75,857	53.71	J. P. Mathew	INC	UDF	59,515	42.14	16,342
105	Ambalappuzha	G. Sudhakaran	CPI(M)	LDF	63,728	54.48	M. Liju	INC	UDF	47,148	40.31	16,580
106	Kuttanad	Thomas Chandy	NCP	LDF	60,010	50.81	K. C. Joseph	KC(M)	UDF	52,039	44.06	7,971
107	Haripad	Ramesh Chennithala	INC	UDF	67,378	50.03	G. Krishnaprasad	CPI	LDF	61,858	45.93	5,520
108	Kayamkulam	C. K. Sadasivan	CPI(M)	LDF	67,409	48.28	M. Murali	INC	UDF	66,094	47.34	1,315
109	Mavelikara (SC)	R. Rajesh	CPI(M)	LDF	65,903	49.30	K. R. Gouriamma	JPSS	UDF	60,754	45.45	5,149
110	Chengannur	P. C. Vishnunath	INC	UDF	65,156	51.98	C. S. Sujatha	CPI(M)	LDF	52,656	42.01	12,500
Pathanamthitta district
111	Thiruvalla	Mathew T. Thomas	JD(S)	LDF	63,289	49.97	Victor T. Thomas	KC(M)	UDF	52,522	41.47	10,767
112	Ranni	Raju Abrham	CPI(M)	LDF	58,391	48.51	Peelipose Thomas	INC	UDF	51,777	43.02	6,614
113	Aranmula	K. Sivadasan Nair	INC	UDF	64,845	47.69	K. Rajagopalan	CPI(M)	LDF	58,334	42.90	6,511
114	Konni	Adoor Prakash	INC	UDF	65,724	47.69	M. S. Rajendran	CPI(M)	LDF	57,950	42.90	7,774
115	Adoor (SC)	Chittayam Gopakumar	CPI	LDF	63,501	48.51	Pandalam Sudhakaran	INC	UDF	62,894	43.02	607
Kollam district
116	Karunagappally	C. Divakaran	CPI	LDF	69,086	50.13	A. N. Rajanbabu	JPSS	UDF	54,565	39.59	14,521
117	Chavara	Shibu Baby John	KRSP	UDF	65,002	51.16	N. K. Premachandran	RSP	LDF	58,941	46.39	6,061
118	Kunnathur (SC)	Kovoor Kunjomon	RSP	LDF	71,923	50.13	P. K. Ravi	JPSS	UDF	59,835	39.59	12,088
119	Kottarakkara	P. Aisha Potty	CPI(M)	LDF	74,069	53.89	N. Murali	KC(B)	UDF	53,477	38.91	20,592
120	Pathanapuram	K. B. Ganesh Kumar	KC(B)	UDF	71,421	55.64	K. Rajagopal	CPI(M)	LDF	51,019	39.74	20,402
121	Punalur	K. Raju	CPI	LDF	72,648	54.62	Johnson Abraham	INC	UDF	54,643	41.01	18,005
122	Chadayamangalam	Mullakkara Ratnakaran	CPI	LDF	71,231	55.90	Shahida Kamal	INC	UDF	47,607	37.36	23,624
123	Kundara	M. A. Baby	CPI(M)	LDF	67,135	52.48	P. Jermias	INC	UDF	52,342	40.92	14,793
124	Kollam	P. K. Gurudasan	CPI(M)	LDF	57,986	50.86	K. C. Rajan	INC	UDF	49,446	43.37	8,540
125	Eravipuram	A. A. Azeez	RSP	LDF	51,271	49.00	P.K.K. Bawa	IUML	UDF	43,259	41.34	8,012
126	Chathanoor	G. S. Jayalal	CPI	LDF	60,187	52.66	Bindu Krishna	INC	UDF	47,598	41.64	12,589
Thiruvananthapuram district
127	Varkala	Varkala Kahar	INC	UDF	57,755	51.98	A. A. Rahim	CPI(M)	LDF	47,045	42.68	10,710
128	Attingal (SC)	B. Satyan	CPI	LDF	63,558	55.44	Thankamony Diwakaran	INC	UDF	33,493	29.22	30,065
129	Chirayinkeezhu (SC)	V. Sasi	CPI	LDF	59,601	52.93	K. Vidyadharan	INC	UDF	47,376	42.07	12,225
130	Nedumangad	Palode Ravi	INC	UDF	59,789	47.87	P. Ramachandran Nair	CPI	LDF	54,759	43.84	5,030
131	Vamanapuram	Koliakode N. Krishnan Nair	CPI(M)	LDF	57,381	46.51	C. Mohanchandran	INC	UDF	55,145	44.70	2,236
132	Kazhakootam	M. A. Vaheed	INC	UDF	50,787	46.38	K. Rajagopalan	CPI(M)	LDF	48,591	44.38	2,196
133	Vattiyoorkavu	K. Muraleedharan	INC	UDF	56,531	50.19	Philip Cheriyan	IND	LDF	40,364	35.84	16,167
134	Thiruvananthapuram	V. S. Sivakumar	INC	UDF	49,122	45.87	V. Surendran Pillai	KC(AMG)	UDF	43,770	40.87	5,352
135	Nemom	V. Sivankutty	CPI(M)	LDF	50,076	42.99	O. Rajagopal	BJP	NDA	43,861	37.49	6,215
136	Aruvikkara	G. Karthikeyan	INC	UDF	56,797	48.79	A. Sreedharan Nair	RSP	LDF	46,123	39.62	10,674
137	Parassala	A. T. George	INC	UDF	60,578	44.80	Anavoor Nagappan	CPI(M)	LDF	60,073	44.43	505
138	Kattakada	N. Sakthan	INC	UDF	52,368	44.63	M. V. Jayadali	IND	LDF	39,452	33.62	12,916
139	Kovalam	Jameela Prakasam	JD(S)	LDF	59,510	47.60	George Mercier	INC	UDF	52,305	41.84	7,305
140	Neyyatinkara	R. Selvaraj	CPI(M)	LDF	54,711	48.98	Thampanoor Ravi	INC	UDF	48,009	42.98	6,702

Note:-

- (SC) – Constituency reserved for Scheduled caste candidates.
- (ST) – Constituency reserved for Scheduled tribe candidates.

=== Performance of political parties ===
Political Party		No. of Candidates	Seats won	Votes	Percentage
1	Bharatiya Janata Party (BJP)	138	0	1,053,654	6.03
2	Communist Marxist Party (CMP)	3	0	161,739	0.93
3	Communist Party of India (CPI)	27	13	1,522,478	8.72
4	Communist Party of India (Marxist) (CPI (M))	84	45	4,921,354	28.18
5	Indian National Congress (INC)	82	38	4,667,520	26.73
6	Others / Independents	313	0	278,608	1.60
7	Janata Dal (Secular) (JDS)	5	4	264,631	1.52
8	Kerala Congress (Jacob)	3	1	159,252	0.91
9	Kerala Congress (Balakrishna Pillai)	2	1	124,898	0.72
10	Kerala Congress (Mani) (KC M)	15	9	861,829	4.94
11	LDF supported Independents	9	2	418,619	2.40
12	Muslim League (IUML)	24	20	1,446,570	8.28
13	Nationalist Congress Party (NCP)	8	2	216,948	1.24
14	Revolutionary Socialist Party (RSP)	4	2	228,258	1.31
15	Revolutionary Socialist Party (Baby John) (RSP B)	1	1	65,002	0.37
16	Social Democratic Party of India (SDPI)	69	0	139,481	0.80
17	Socialist Janata (Democratic) (SJD)	6	2	287,649	1.65
Total			140	17,461,779	100.00
Valid votes				17,461,779	99.97
Invalid votes				5,439	0.03
Votes cast / turnout				17,467,218	75.26
Abstentions				5,740,920	24.74
Registered voters				23,208,138	

=== Performance of political fronts ===
Sl. No:	Front	No. of Candidates	Seats won	Votes	Percentage
1	United Democratic Front	140	72	8,002,874	45.83
2	Left Democratic Front	136	68	7,618,445	43.63
3	National Democratic Alliance	140	0	1,058,504	6.06
5	Independents and Others	550	0	553,832	3.17

== Aftermath ==
R. Selvaraj won the election as a Communist Party of India (Marxist) (CPI (M)) candidate but later resigned and won again from Neyyanttinkara Constituency in the by-election.

== By-elections ==
1.Piravom Bye-election was held in Piravom Assembly constituency following the death of sitting MLA and minister T. M. Jacob on 30 October 2011.

2.Neyyattinkara By-election was held in Neyyattinkara Assembly constituency following the resignation of sitting MLA R. Selvaraj on 9 March 2012.

3.Aruvikkara Bye-election was held in Aruvikkara Assembly constituency following the death of sitting MLA and SPEAKER G. Karthikeyan on 7 March 2015

Sl. No:	Constituency	UDF candidate	Party	Votes	LDF candidate	Party	Votes	BJP candidate	Votes	Winner	Margin	Winning alliance
1	Piravom	Anoop Jacob	KC(J)	82756	M.J. Jacob	CPI(M)	70686	K. R. Rajagopal	3241	Anoop Jacob	12070	UDF
2	Neyyattinkara	R. Selvaraj	INC	52528	F. Lawrence	CPI(M)	46194	O. Rajagopal	30507	R. Selvaraj	6334	UDF
3	Aruvikkara	K. S. Sabarinathan	INC	56448	M. Vijayakumar	CPI(M)	46320	O. Rajagopal	34145	K. S. Sabarinathan	10128	UDF

Alliance wise result (after by elections)
LDF+	Seats	UDF+	Seats	Others	Seats
CPI(M)	44*	INC	40*	BJP	0
CPI	13	IUML	20	JD(U)	0
JD(S)	4	KC(M)	9		
NCP	2	SJ(D)	2		
KC	0	CMP	0		
IC(S)	0	KC(J)	1		
JSS	0	KC(B)	1		
IND	2	KRSP(BJ)	0		
RSP	2	RSP(B)	1		
Total (2011)	67*	Total (2011)	73*	Total (2011)	0
Total (2006)	98	Total (2006)	42	Total (2006)	0

* indicates one extra seat won by INC from CPI(M) after by-elections in Neyyatinkara constituency assembly seat sharing post the by-election results:

UDF	LDF	Others
73	67	0
