= A. C. Moideen =

Indian politician

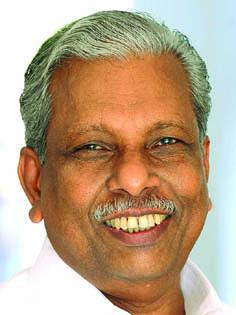

Member of the Kerala Legislative Assembly
- Incumbent
- Assumed office 19 May 2016
- Preceded by: Babu M. Palissery
- Constituency: Kunnamkulam
- In office 2004 – 13 May 2011
- Preceded by: V. Balram
- Succeeded by: C. N. Balakrishnan
- Constituency: Wadakkanchery

Minister for Local self-government, Kerala
- In office 14 August 2018 – 3 May 2021
- Preceded by: K. T. Jaleel
- Succeeded by: M. V. Govindan

Minister for Industries and Sports, Kerala
- In office 22 November 2016 – 14 August 2018
- Preceded by: E. P. Jayarajan
- Succeeded by: E. P. Jayarajan

Minister for Co-operation and Tourism, Kerala
- In office 25 May 2016 – 21 November 2016
- Preceded by: C. N. Balakrishnan (Minister for Co-operation); A. P. Anil Kumar (Minister for Tourism)
- Succeeded by: Kadakampally Surendran

Personal details
- Born: 18 April 1956 (age 70) Wadakkancherry, Thrissur district, Kerala, India
- Spouse: Smt. Usaiba Beevi
- Children: Dr. Sheeba

A. Chiyamu Moideen is an Indian politician. He is the current member of the 15th Kerala Legislature from Kunnamkulam constituency. He was the Minister for Local Self Government in the Pinarayi Vijayan ministry.

== Personal life ==
Son of Shri Chiyamu and Smt. Fathima Beevi, he was born at Wadakkanchery on 18 April 1956. He was married to Smt.Usaiba Beevi S and the couple have only one daughter Dr. Sheeba.

== Political life ==
He entered politics through S.F.I. and was Secretary, K.S.Y.F. Wadakkanchery Area Committee, D.Y.F.I. Wadakkanchery Block Committee and Panangattukara Grameena Vayanasala; President, Thekkumkara Grama Panchayat, Kallampara Milk Marketing Co-operative Society; Secretary, C.P.I.(M) Thekkumkara Local Committee and Wadakkanchery Area Committee; Secretary, C.P.I.(M) District Committee, Thrissur. He served as Minister for Co-operation and Tourism from 25 May 2016 to 21 November 2016.

He is now, Member, C.P.I.(M) State Committee; State Working Committee Member, Kerala Karshaka Sangham.

He was previously elected to the 11th KLA in the by-election on 10 May 2004, 12th KLA in 2006, 14th KLA in 2016.

Kerala Legislative Assembly Election
Year	Constituency	Closest Rival	Majority (Votes)	Won/Lost
2004; By-Election	Wadakkanchery	K. Muraleedharan (INC)	3715	Won
2006	Wadakkanchery	T. V. Chandra Mohan (DIC)	20821	Won
2016	Kunnamkulam	C. P. John (CMP)	7782	Won
2021	Kunnamkulam	K. Jayasankar (INC)	26631	Won
2026	Kunnamkulam	P. T. Ajay Mohan (INC)	4563	Won
