= V. M. Ummer Master =

Indian politician

- Born: Thamarassery, Kerala, India
- Occupation: Politician

V. M. Ummer Master is an Indian politician and social activist from Kozhikode district. He is a member of the Indian Union Muslim League (IUML).

Between 2011 and 2016, Ummer Master served as the MLA of the Koduvally constituency, which he had won by a margin of 16,552 votes. During his tenure, he became one of 14 MLAs to achieve a perfect attendance record. In the 2006 and 2016 legislative assembly elections, he contested the Thiruvambady constituency but was defeated both times by CPI (M) candidate George M. Thomas.
