= K. S. Saleekha =

Indian politician

Member of Kerala Legislative Assembly
- In office 2011–2016
- Constituency: Shornur

Personal details
- Born: 15 June 1961 (age 64) Pazhaya Lakkidi
- Party: Communist Party of India (Marxist)
- Spouse: A Kunjimon
- Children: 2 (Nishad and Shameena)

K. S. Saleekha (born 15 June 1961) is an Indian politician. She Is A Member of Central Committee Communist Party of India (Marxist) former MLA of Shornur constituency from 2011 to 2016. and Sreekrishnapuram constituency from 2006 to 2011

== Positions held ==
- Member, CPI(M) Central Committee (2025 onwards)
- Member, CPI(M) Kerala State Committee (2022 onwards)
- Member, CPI(M) Palakkad District Committee (2002 onwards)
- State Joint Secretary, All India Democratic Women's Association
- Member, District Panchayat, Palakkad (2000–2005)
- Palakkad District Secretary, All India Democratic Women's Association (1999–2010)
- President, Sreekrishnapuram Block Panchayat (1995–2000)
- Director, Kadampazhipuram Service Co-operative Bank (1988–1996)

== Personal life ==
She was born at Pazhaya Lakkidi on 15 June 1961. She is the daughter of Saidali and Khadeeja.
