= Kunnamkulam Assembly constituency =

Constituency of the Kerala legislative assembly in India

Kunnamkulam
- Constituency No. 62 for the Kerala Legislative Assembly
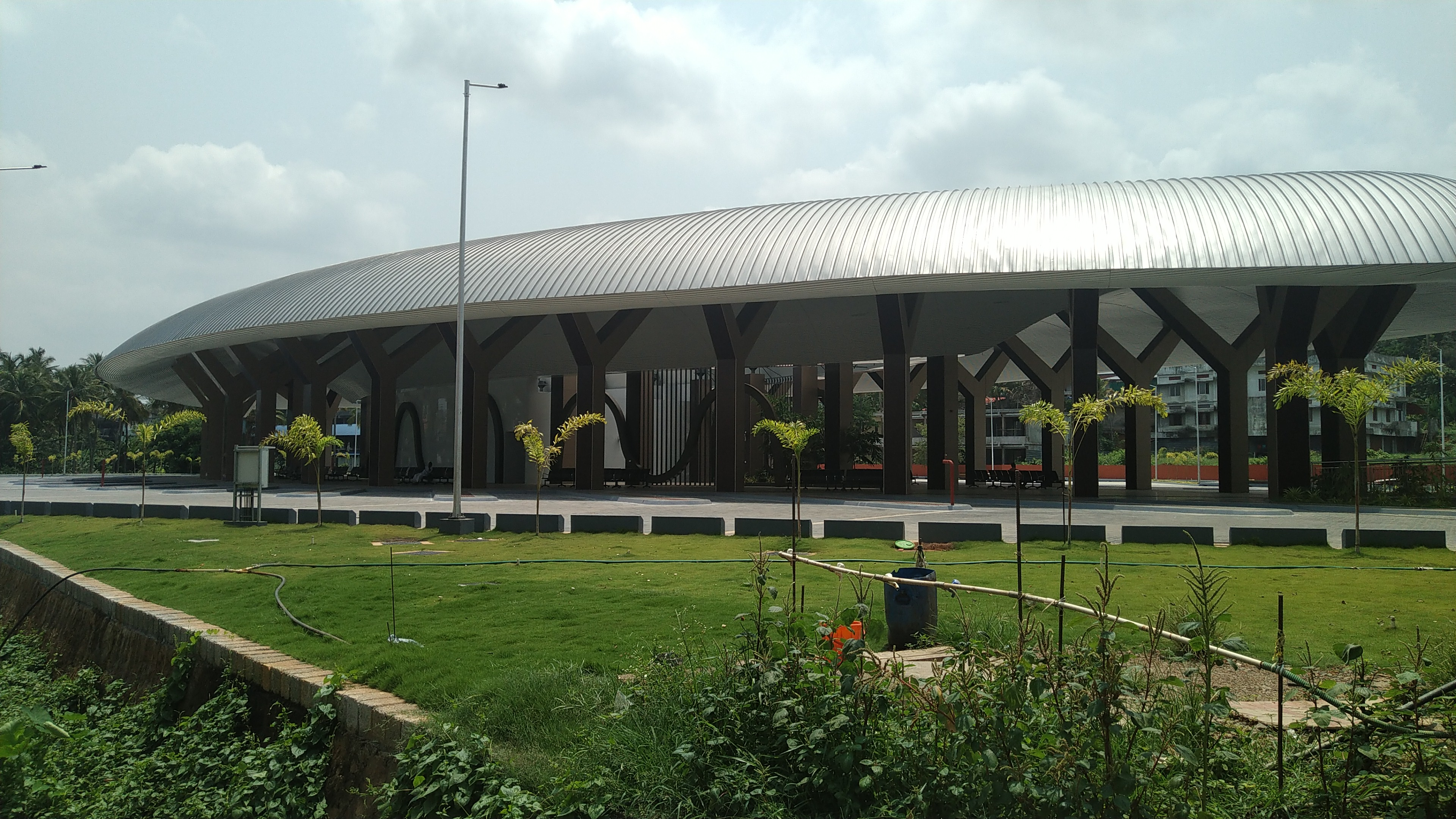
- Kunnamkulam New Bus Stand

Constituency details
- Country: India
- Region: South India
- State: Kerala
- District: Thrissur
- Lok Sabha constituency: Alathur
- Established: 1957
- Total electors: 1,91,274 (2016)
- Reservation: None

Member of Legislative Assembly
- 16th Kerala Legislative Assembly
- Incumbent A. C. Moideen
- Party: CPI(M)
- Alliance: LDF
- Elected year: 2026

Kunnamkulam State assembly constituency is one of the 140 state legislative assembly constituencies in Kerala. It is also one of the seven state legislative assembly constituencies included in Alathur Lok Sabha constituency. As of the 2026 Assembly elections, the current MLA is A. C. Moideen of CPI(M).

== Local self-governed segments ==
Kunnamkulam Assembly constituency is composed of the following local self-governed segments:

Sl no.	Name	Status (Grama panchayat/Municipality)	Taluk
1	Kunnamkulam	Municipality	Kunnamkulam
2	Chowannur	Grama panchayat	Kunnamkulam
3	Kadangode	Grama panchayat	Kunnamkulam
4	Kadavallur	Grama panchayat	Kunnamkulam
5	Kattakampal	Grama panchayat	Kunnamkulam
6	Porkulam	Grama panchayat	Kunnamkulam
7	Velur	Grama panchayat	Kunnamkulam
8	Erumapetty	Grama panchayat	Kunnamkulam and Thalapilly

Local Bodies on Kunnamkulam (State Assembly constituency)

== Members of Legislative Assembly ==
The following list contains all members of Kerala Legislative Assembly who have represented the constituency:

Election	Niyama Sabha	Name	Party	Tenure
1957	1st	T. K. Krishnan	Communist Party of India	1957-1960
1960	2nd	P. R. Krishnan	Indian National Congress	1960-1965
1967	3rd	A. S. N. Nambissan	Communist Party of India	1967 – 1970
1970	4th	T. K. Krishnan	Communist Party of India	1970 - 1977
1977	5th	K. P. Vishwanathan	Indian National Congress	1977-1980
1980	6th	K. P. Vishwanathan	Indian National Congress	1980 – 1982
1982	7th	K. P. Aravindaksan	Communist Party of India	1982 – 1987
1987	8th	K. P. Aravindaksan	Communist Party of India	1987 – 1991
1991	9th	T. V. Chandramohan	Indian National Congress	1991 – 1996
1996	10th	N. R. Balan	Communist Party of India	1996 – 2001
2001	11th	T. V. Chandramohan	Indian National Congress	2001 – 2006
2006	12th	Babu M. Palissery	Communist Party of India	2006 – 2011
2011	13th	Babu M. Palissery	Communist Party of India	2011 – 2016
2016	14th	A. C. Moideen	Communist Party of India	2016 – 2021
2021	15th	A. C. Moideen	Communist Party of India	2021 - 2026
2026	16th	A. C. Moideen	Communist Party of India	Incumbent

== Election results ==
=== 2026 ===
2026 Kerala Legislative Assembly election: Kunnamkulam
Party	Candidate	Votes	%	±%
CPI(M)	A. C. Moideen	69,522	45.22	▼3.56
INC	P. T. Ajay Mohan	64,959	42.25	▲10.67
BDJS	K. R. Rajin	17,104	11.13	▼6.85
AAP	Rajeev K. S.	1,035	0.67	
NOTA	None of the above	1,115	0.73	▲0.37
Margin of victory		4,563	2.97	▼14.30
Turnout		1,53,735		
CPI(M) hold		Swing	▼3.56	

=== 2021 ===
There were 1,98,378 registered voters in the constituency for the 2021 election.

2021 Kerala Legislative Assembly election: Kunnamkulam
Party	Candidate	Votes	%	±%
CPI(M)	A. C. Moideen	75,532	48.78	▲6.86
INC	K. Jayasankar	48,901	31.58	▼5.19
BJP	K. K. Aneeshkumar	27,833	17.98	▼1.45
NOTA	None of the above	559	0.36	−0.07
Margin of victory		26,631	17.27	
Turnout		1,50,898	78.24%	
CPI(M) hold		Swing		

=== 2016 ===
There were 1,91,274 registered voters in the constituency for the 2016 election.

2016 Kerala Legislative Assembly election: Kunnamkulam
Party	Candidate	Votes	%	±%
CPI(M)	A. C. Moideen	63,274	41.92	▼2.42
CMP	C. P. John	55,492	36.77	▼7.21
BJP	K. K. Aneeshkumar	29,325	19.43	▲10.5
SDPI	Jileef	1,204	0.74	−
PDP	Sulaiman	710	0.47	−
NOTA	None of the above	653	0.43	−
Independent	Sulaiman P. C.	267	0.18	−
Margin of victory		7,782	5.15	
Turnout		1,50,925	78.91%	
CPI(M) hold		Swing	▼2.42	

=== 2011 ===
There were 1,74,161 registered voters in the constituency for the 2011 election.

2011 Kerala Legislative Assembly election: Kunnamkulam
Party	Candidate	Votes	%	±%
CPI(M)	Babu M. Palissery	58,244	44.34	
CMP	C. P. John	57,635	43.98	
BJP	K. K. Aneesh Kumar	11,725	8.93	
Independent	K. P. Preman	2,059	1.57	
Independent	John	860	0.65	
BSP	Unnikrishnan Varoli	693	0.53	−
Margin of victory		481	0.36	
Turnout		1,31,344	75.42%	
CPI(M) hold		Swing		
