= James Mathew =

Indian politician

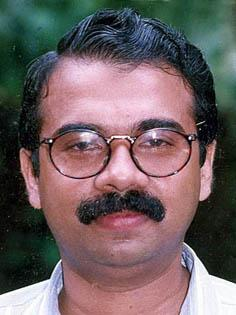

Member of Legislative Assembly
- In office 2011–2021
- Succeeded by: M. V. Govindan Master
- Constituency: Taliparamba
- Preceded by: C. K. P. Padmanabhan

Personal details
- Born: 20 March 1961 (age 65) Taliparamba, Kannur, Kerala
- Party: CPI(M)
- Spouse: N. Sukanya

James Mathew is an Indian politician from Kannur district, Kerala state, and was a member of the Legislative Assembly of Kerala in the 13th and 14th Kerala Legislative Assembly. He represents the Taliparamba constituency of Kerala and is a Kerala state committee member of the Communist Party of India (Marxist), or CPI(M).

== Personal life ==
He was born in Kannur on 20 March 1961 to N. J. Mathew and Chinnamma Mathew. He holds a Bachelor of Arts degree in political science. He is married to N. Sukanya. They have one daughter and one son.

== Political career ==
He began his political journey as an SFI activist during the Emergency period. Over time, he held various positions within the organization, including Kannur District President, Secretary, State President, State Secretary, and All India Joint Secretary of SFI. He faced police assault during his participation in student agitations led by SFI.

Later, he served as the Area Secretary for CPI(M) in Sreekandapuram and as a member of both the CPI(M) District Secretariat and District Committee in Kannur. He was a member of the Calicut University Senate, Kannur University Syndicate, and Kannur District Panchayat. He also served as the Standing Committee Chairman in the Kannur District Panchayat.

Kerala Legislative Assembly Election
Year	Constituency	Closest Rival	Majority (Votes)	Won/Lost
2011	Taliparamba	Adv Job Michel (KC(M))	27861	Won
2016	Taliparamba	Rajesh Nambiar (KC(M))	50489	Won
