= Chalakudy Assembly constituency =

Constituency of the Kerala legislative assembly in India

Chalakudy
- Constituency No. 72 for the Kerala Legislative Assembly
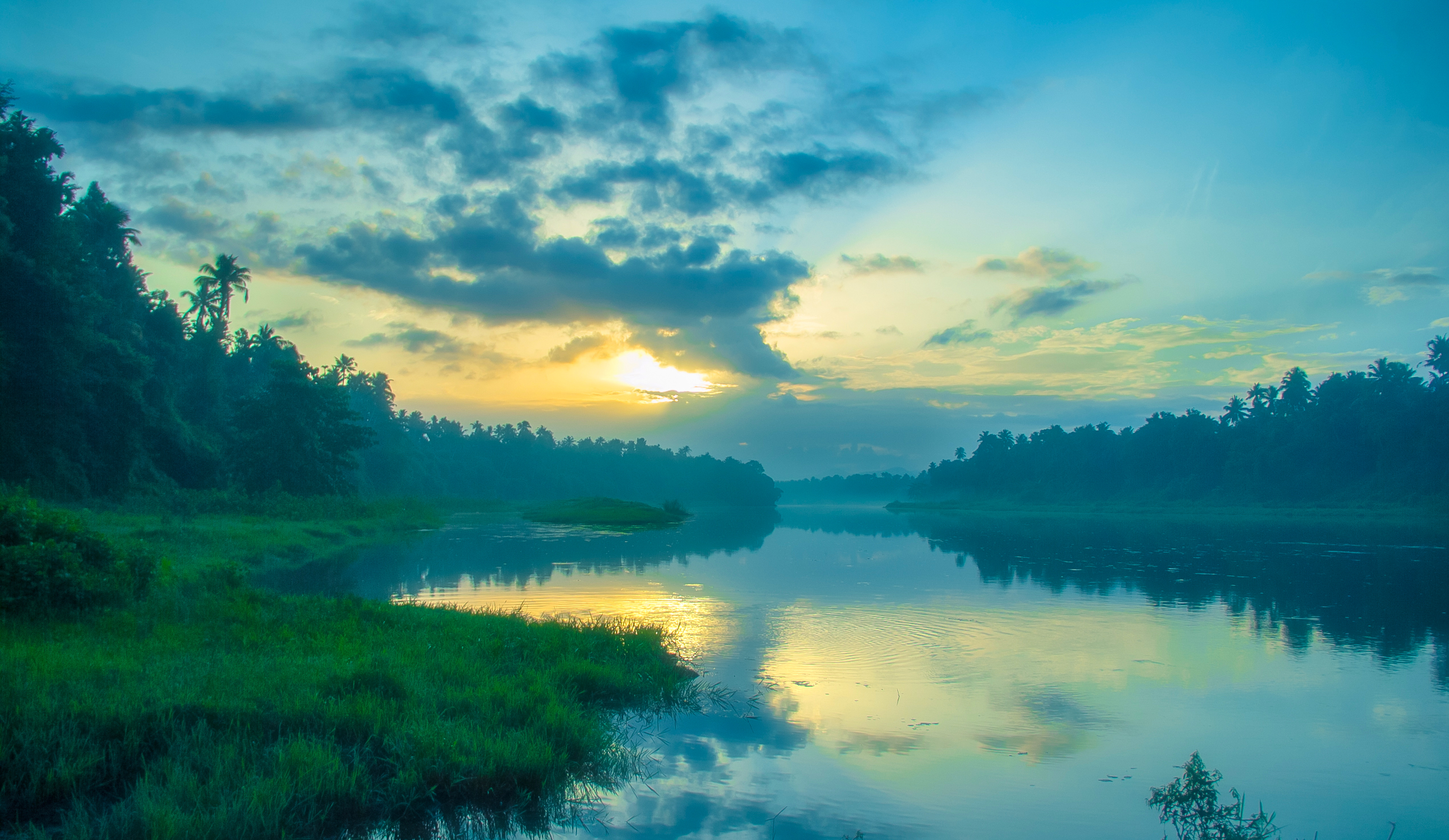
- A summer sunrise from the Chalakudy River bank in Chalakudy Assembly constituency.

Constituency details
- Country: India
- Region: South India
- State: Kerala
- District: Thrissur
- Established: 1957
- Total electors: 1,90,675 (2016)
- Reservation: None

Member of Legislative Assembly
- 16th Kerala Legislative Assembly
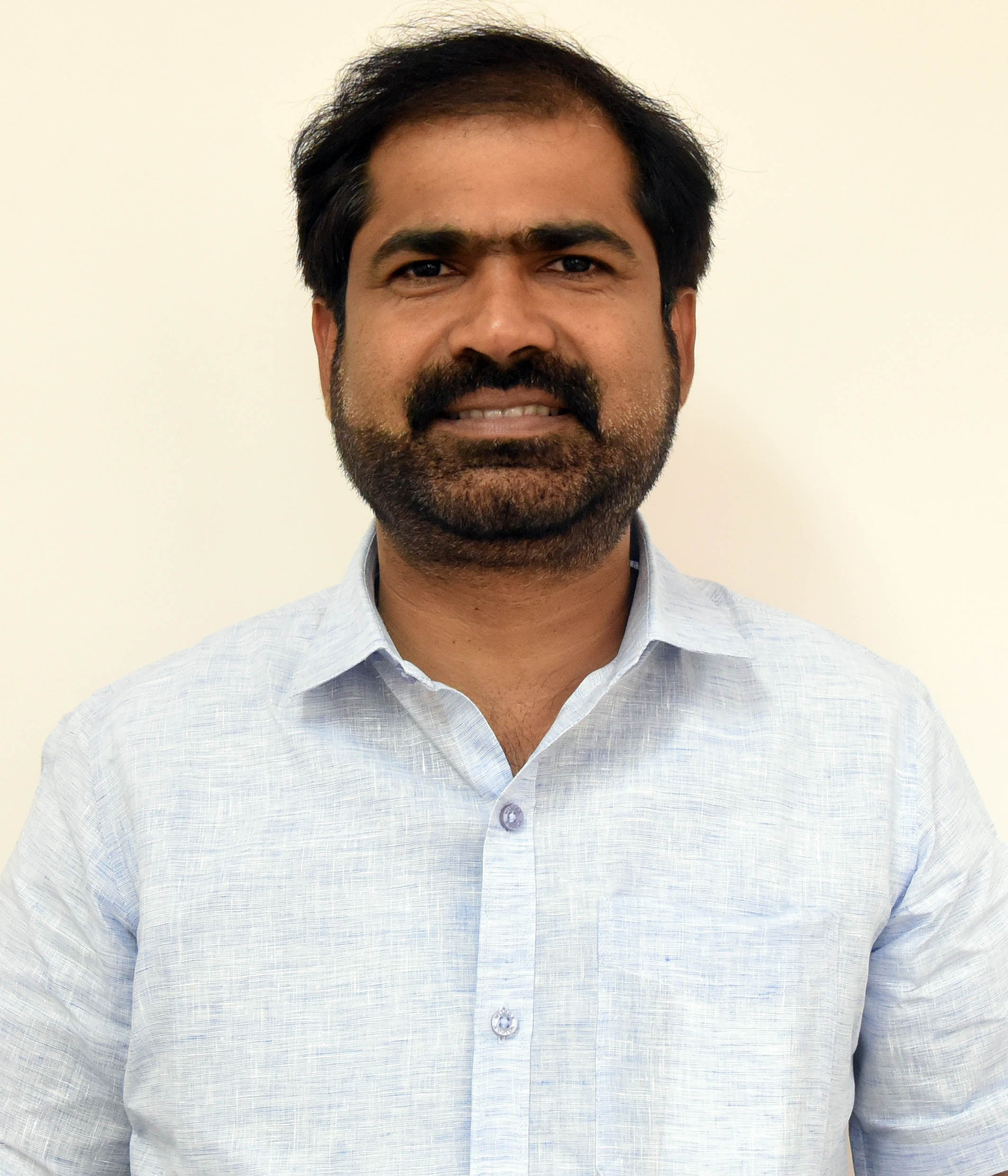
- Incumbent T. J. Saneesh Kumar Joseph
- Party: INC
- Alliance: UDF
- Elected year: 2026

Chalakudy State assembly constituency is one of the 140 state legislative assembly constituencies in Kerala. It is also one of the seven state legislative assembly constituencies included in Chalakudy Lok Sabha constituency. As of the 2026 assembly elections, the current MLA is T. J. Saneesh Kumar Joseph of Indian National Congress.

== Local self-governed segments ==
Chalakudy Assembly constituency is composed of the following local self-governed segments:

Name	Status (Grama panchayat/Municipality)	Taluk
Chalakudy	Municipality	Chalakudy
Athirappilly	Grama panchayat	Chalakudy
Kadukutty	Grama panchayat	Chalakudy
Kodakara	Grama panchayat	Chalakudy
Kodassery	Grama panchayat	Chalakudy
Koratty	Grama panchayat	Chalakudy
Melur	Grama panchayat	Chalakudy
Pariyaram	Grama panchayat	Chalakudy

== Members of Legislative Assembly ==
Election	Niyama Sabha	Member	Party
1957	1st	P. K. Chathan	Communist Party of India
1957	1st	C. G. Janardhanan	Praja Socialist Party
1960	2nd	K. K. Balakrishnan	Indian National Congress
1960	2nd	C. G. Janardhanan	Praja Socialist Party
1967	3rd	P. P. George	Indian National Congress
1970	4th	P. P. George	Indian National Congress
1977	5th	P. K. Ittoop	Kerala Congress
1980	6th	P. K. Ittoop	Kerala Congress
1982	7th	K. J. George	Janata Party
1987	8th	K. J. George	Janata Party
1991	9th	Rosamma Chacko	Indian National Congress
1996	10th	Savithri Lakshmanan	Indian National Congress
2001	11th	Savithri Lakshmanan	Indian National Congress
2006	12th	B. D. Devassy	Communist Party of India
2011	13th	B. D. Devassy	Communist Party of India
2016	14th	B. D. Devassy	Communist Party of India
2021	15th	T. J. Saneesh Kumar Joseph	Indian National Congress
2026	16th	T. J. Saneesh Kumar Joseph	Indian National Congress

== Election results ==
=== 2026 ===
}} }} }} }} }}

2026 Kerala Legislative Assembly election: Chalakudy
Party	Candidate	Votes	%	±%
INC	T. J. Saneesh Kumar Joseph	71,202	51.63	▲8.4
KC(M)	Biju S Chirayath	48,042	34.83	▼7.66
TTP	Adv. Charly Paul	16,030	11.62	▼0.42
AAP	Wilson Kallen	519	0.38	−
NOTA	None of the above	932	0.68	▼0.02
Margin of victory		23,156	16.78	▲16.04
Turnout		137931		
INC hold		Swing		

=== 2021 ===
There were 1,92,767 registered voters in the constituency for the 2021 election.

2021 Kerala Legislative Assembly election: Chalakkudy
Party	Candidate	Votes	%	±%
INC	T. J. Saneesh Kumar Joseph	61,888	43.23	▲11.58
KC(M)	Dennies K. Antony	60,831	42.49	−
BDJS	Unnikrishnan K. A.	17,301	12.09	▼5.35
NOTA	None of the above	1,000	0.70	−
Independent	T. N. Rajan	713	0.50	−
BSP	M. S. Asokan	617	0.43	−
SUCI(C)	P. K. Dharmajan	253	0.18	−
Independent	Rosilin	248	0.17	−
Independent	Joshy Vattoli	160	0.11	−
Independent	Cheriya	143	0.10	−
Margin of victory		1,057	0.74	▼16.98
INC gain from CPI(M)		Swing	▲11.58	
Turnout		1,43,154	74.26	▼4.61

=== 2016 ===
There were 1,90,675 registered voters in the constituency for the 2016 election.

2016 Kerala Legislative Assembly election: Chalakkudy
Party	Candidate	Votes	%	±%
CPI(M)	B. D. Devassy	74,251	49.37	▼1.19
INC	T. U. Radhakrishnan	47,603	31.65	▼14.60
BDJS	Unnikrishnan K. A.	26,229	17.44	−
NOTA	None of the above	739	0.49	−
Independent	Jjo	367	0.24	−
Independent	Sabu Chathely	304	0.20	−
Independent	A. E. Sabira	191	0.13	−
Independent	N. A. Devassy Nellippilly	149	0.10	−
Margin of victory		26,648	17.72	▲15.79
CPI(M) hold		Swing	▼1.19	
Turnout		1,50,394	78.87	▲2.41

=== 2011 ===
There were 1,76,055 registered voters in the constituency for the 2011 election.

2011 Kerala Legislative Assembly election: Chalakkudy
Party	Candidate	Votes	%	±%
CPI(M)	B. D. Devassy	63,610	48.18	
INC	Benny K. T.	61,061	46.25	
BJP	Sudheer Baby	5,976	4.53	
Independent	Pushpagadan P. M.	681	0.52	
BSP	Subramanian V. k.	451	0.34	
Independent	Jayakumar E.	258	0.20	
Margin of victory		2,549	1.93	
CPI(M) hold		Swing		
Turnout		1,32,037	76.46	

== See also ==
- Chalakudy
- Thrissur district
- List of constituencies of the Kerala Legislative Assembly
- 2016 Kerala Legislative Assembly election
