= Babu M. Palissery =

Indian politician (1958–2025)

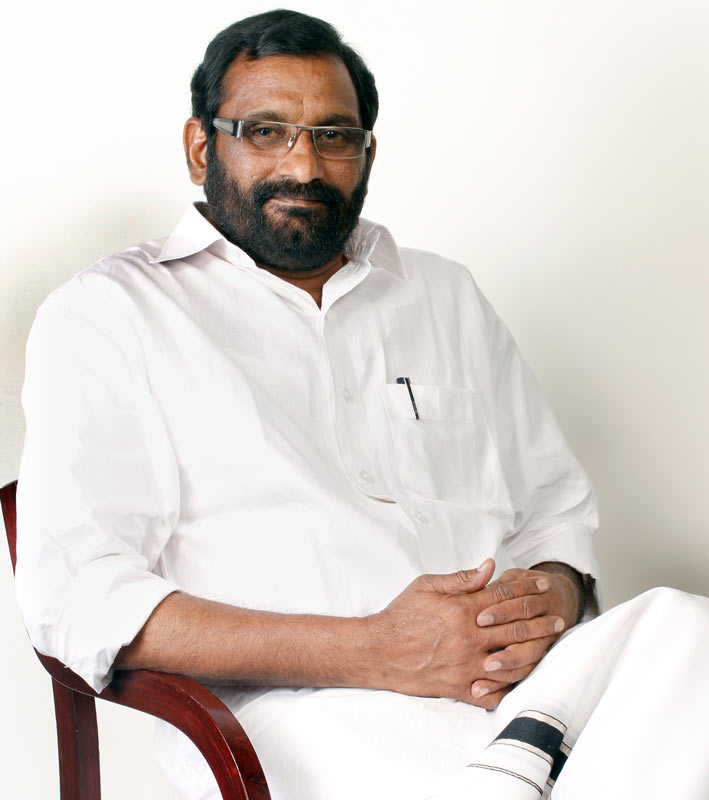

Member of the Kerala Legislative Assembly for Kunnamkulam, Thrissur

Personal details
- Born: Sankaranarayanan; 13 May 1958
- Died: 14 October 2025 (aged 67) Kunnamkulam, Kerala, India
- Political party: CPI(M)
- Spouse: Indira
- Children: Akhil Palissery (son); Aswathy Palissery (daughter)

Babu M. Palissery (13 May 1958 – 14 October 2025) was an Indian politician who was a member of Communist Party of India (Marxist) from Thrissur. He served as a Member of the Kerala Legislative Assembly from the Kunnamkulam constituency. Palissery was elected for two consecutive terms between 2006 and 2011.

== Life and career ==
Babu M. Palisseryn was born in Sankaranarayan on 13 May 1958, the eldest son of P. Raman Nair alias Chinnapan Nair and Amminiyamma. He had four siblings named Aniyan, Balaji, Thankamol and Raji. At the age of 38, he married Indira and they had two children, Aswathy and Akhil.

In 2006 Kerala Legislative Assembly election he beat his opponent by 21,785 votes. In 2011 Kerala State Legislative Assembly election he beat his opponent CP John to become the Member of Kerala Legislative Assembly from Kunnamkulam for the second time.

Palisseryn died from complications of Parkinson's disease on 14 October 2025, at the age of 67.
