= R. Rajesh =

Indian politician

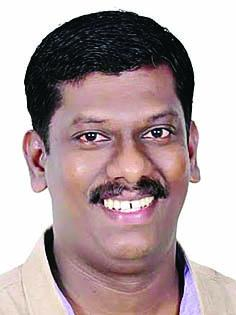
- R. Rajesh

Member of Kerala Legislative Assembly
- In office 2011–2021
- Preceded by: M Murali
- Succeeded by: M. S. Arun Kumar
- Constituency: Mavelikkara

Personal details
- Born: 15 April 1981 (age 45) Kollakadavu
- Party: Communist Party of India (Marxist)
- Spouse: Remya Remanan

Raghavan Rajesh is an Indian politician of Communist Party of India (Marxist) and represents Mavelikkara constituency of Kerala Legislative Assembly.

== Personal life ==
Rajesh was born (15 April 1981) at Kollakadavu to A. T. Raghavan and Santha Raghavan at Kollakadavu in Alappuzha District. He holds a master's degree in science. Rajesh is married to Remya Remanan.

== Political career ==
He was first elected to Kerala Legislative Assembly from Mavelikkara assembly constituency in 2011 Kerala assembly elections by defeating K.K. Shaju of J.S.S (UDF) by a margin of 5149 votes. He was re-elected for the second time in 2016 defeating Baiju Kalasala of Indian National Congress by a margin of 31542 votes.
