= Palode Ravi =

Indian politician (born 1949)

- പാലോട് രവി
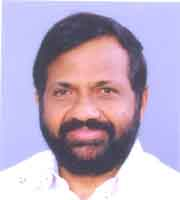

Deputy Speaker, Kerala Legislative Assembly
- In office 2 December 2015 – 20 May 2016
- Governor: P. Sathasivam
- Preceded by: N. Sakthan
- Succeeded by: V. Sasi

Member of the Kerala Legislative Assembly
- In office 1 June 2011 – 2 June 2016
- Preceded by: Mankode Radhakrishnan
- Succeeded by: C. Divakaran
- Constituency: Nedumangad
- In office 1991–2001
- Preceded by: K. V. Surendranath
- Succeeded by: Mankode Radhakrishnan
- Constituency: Nedumangad

President, District Congress Committee, Thiruvananthapuram
- In office 29 August 2021 – 26 July 2025
- Preceded by: Neyyattinkara Sanal
- Succeeded by: N. Sakthan

Personal details
- Born: 25 July 1949 (age 76) Palode, United State of Travancore and Cochin, Dominion of India (present day Palode, Kerala, India)
- Party: Indian National Congress
- Spouse: S. Jayakumari
- Children: 2
- Parent(s): P. Gangadharan Pillai; M. Saraswathy Amma
- Profession: Politician

Palode Ravi (born 25 July 1949) is an Indian politician and former District Congress Committee President of Thiruvananthapuram. He has served as the Deputy speaker and member of the Kerala Legislative Assembly, from the Nedumangad constituency, representing the Indian National Congress.

== Career ==
Ravi entered politics through Kerala Students Union. In his political career he served with many reputed posts such as General Secretary of Kerala Students Union District Committee, President, Kerala Students Union, District Committee, Youth Congress, District Committee and Indian National Trade Union Congress, General Secretary of Indo-Russian Friendship Society, Kerala, Trivandrum District Congress Committee, Member of Executive Committee, Rubber Board, Plantation Labour Committee, Handloom Development Corporation President, Sree Chithira Thirunal Smaraka Samithi, General Secretary of P.N. Panickar Foundation and Member of Governing Body of State & National Literacy Mission, Executive Committee of Rajaram Mohan Roy Library Foundation, Grandhasala Sangham, Vyloppilli Samskriti Bhavan, Sahithya Academy.

At present he is serving as Member of Executive Committees of All India Congress Committee, Kerala Pradesh Congress Committee, All India Secretary of Indian National Trade Union Congress, chairman, ‘Samskara Sahithi’ – the arts and cultural forum of Kerala Pradesh Congress Committee and Office bearer of many trade unions.
