= V. Sasi =

Indian politician

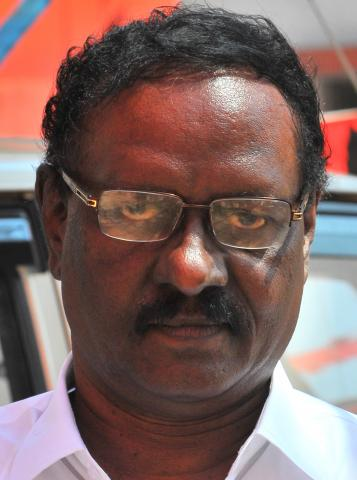
- V. Sasi

Deputy Speaker, Kerala Legislative Assembly
- In office 29 June 2016 – 3 May 2021
- Preceded by: Palode Ravi
- Succeeded by: Chittayam Gopakumar

Member of the Kerala Legislative Assembly
- In office 2011–2026
- Preceded by: Constituency Established
- Succeeded by: Ramya Haridas
- Constituency: Chirayinkeezhu

Personal details
- Born: 12 May 1950 (age 76)
- Party: Communist Party of India
- Spouse: Suma
- Children: 2
- Parent(s): A. Velu; K. Sarada

Velu Sasi (Malayalam: വി. ശശി) is a member of 13th Kerala Legislative Assembly, and 14th Kerala Legislative Assembly. He was the Deputy Speaker of KLA from 2016 to 2021. He belongs to Communist Party of India and represents Chirayinkeezhu constituency.

== Career ==
Sasi was in public service for nearly three decades holding senior positions in government; provided effective direction and governance for the all round development of traditional sectors such as coir, handloom, cashew etc. Served as director, managing director and chairman of various public sector undertakings; member, board of directors, National Textile Corporation, Coir Board; private secretary to Shri. P. K. Raghavan, the Minister for SC/ST development in E. K. Nayanar Ministry; planned, co-ordinated and implemented various development schemes for SC/ST; served as chairman, Kerala Agricultural Workers Welfare Fund Board (2006-2009); Member, Travancore Devaswom Board.

== Personal life ==
He was born on 12 May 1950 to A. Velu and K. Sarada. He has a bachelor's degree in Engineering. He is married to Suma and has 2 children.
