= K. N. A. Khader =

Indian politician

Member of Kerala Legislative Assembly
- In office 2017–2021
- Constituency: Vengara
- In office 2011–2016
- Constituency: Vallikkunu
- In office 2001–2006
- Constituency: Kondotty

Personal details
- Born: 1 January 1950 (age 76) Vadakkemanna
- Party: Indian Union Muslim League
- Spouse: Sabira P
- Children: 5 (Imthiaz, Naseef, Zayan, Jawhar, Aysha Femin)

K. N. A. Khader is a member of 13th Kerala Legislative Assembly. He is a member of Indian Union Muslim League and represents Vengara constituency. He was previously elected to Kerala Legislative Assembly in 2001 representing Kondotty constituency.

== Political life ==
He started his political career in 1970 through students' movements. In 1987, he joined IUML party. He became the state secretary of IUML and now is the Malappuram District Secretary of IUML.

== Positions held ==
- State President and Secretary, A.I.S.F. and member of its National Executive Committee
- Malappuram District Secretary and State Committee member, C.P.I.
- Member and Vice President of Malappuram District Council and Muslim League Malappuram District Secretary
- Muslim League State Secretariat Member
- State President, S.T.U
- Member, Regional Transport Authority
- National Savings Scheme Advisory Committee, Kerala Wakf Board
- Kerala State Library Council Malappuram District President
- Chairman Mahakavi Moyinkutty Vaidyar Smaraka Committee
- Chairman, Serifed
- General Secretary Muslim league, Malappuram District Committee 2016-continues
- Candidate, Vengara by-election 2017

== Personal life ==
He is the son of Alavi Musliyar K N and Elachola Aysha. He was born at Vadakkemanna on January 1, 1950. He is a BA.LLB. degree holder. He is an advocate and notary public.
