= C. K. Nanu =

Indian politician

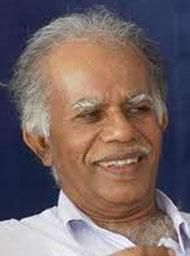

Member of Legislative assembly
- In office 2011–2021
- Constituency: Vatakara
- In office 1996–2006
- Constituency: Vatakara

Minister for Forests and Transport, Govt of Kerala
- In office 2000–2001

Personal details
- Born: 6 September 1937 (age 88) Vatakara, Kozhikode
- Party: Indian Socialist Janata Dal (2026 - Present)
- Other political affiliations: Janata Dal (Secular) till - 2026
- Spouse: Malathi
- Children: Two sons

C. Kunchappu Nanu was a member of Kerala Legislative Assembly from Vatakara constituency. He represented Janata Dal (S) party.

== Political life ==
He started his political life as a Congress Sevadal volunteer. He was the secretary and president of State Youth Congress. He was the minister for Forest and Transport from February 2000 to May 2001. Now, he is a member of Janata Dal (S) National Committee. He was elected to the Kerala Legislative Assembly in 1996, 2001, 2011 and 2016.

== Personal life ==
He was born on 6 September 1937 as the son of C. K. Kunchappu and Chirutha. He is married to Malathi and has two sons and a daughter.
