= K. Dasan =

Indian politician

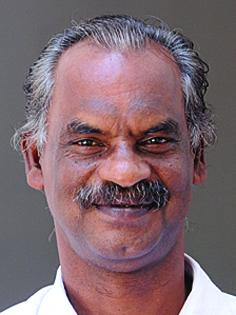
- K.Dasan

Member of Kerala Legislative Assembly
- In office 2011–2021
- Constituency: Koyilandy

Personal details
- Born: 1 December 1952 (age 73) Viyyur, Koyilandy
- Party: Communist Party of India (Marxist)
- Children: One son and one daughter

Kunhiraman Dasan (born 1 December 1952) is a member of the 13th Kerala Legislative Assembly. He belongs to the Communist Party of India (Marxist) party and represents Koyilandy constituency.

== Political life ==
Started political life as Secretary of C.P.I.(M) Quilandy Constituency Committee. He was the Taluk Secretary of Chethu Thozhilali Union (C.I.T.U.), Handloom Workers Union (C.I.T.U). He was the member of Panchayat Board, Quilandy (1978).He was the Chairman of BDC (1989) and Quilandy Municipality (1995-2005). Now, Member of C.P.I.(M) District Committee, Kozhikode; All India General Council, C.I.T.U.; State Committee, C.I.T.U.; Vice President, Kozhikode District Committee, C.I.T.U.; President, Matsya Thozhilali Federation (C.I.T.U.), Kozhikode; Secretary, Chethu Thozhilali Union (C.I.T.U.), Quilandy Taluk; Area Secretary, C.I.T.U., Quilandy.

Kerala Legislative Assembly Election
| Year | Constituency | Closest Rival | Majority (Votes) | Won/Lost |
|---|---|---|---|---|
| 2011 | Quilandy | Adv.K.P.Anil Kumar(INC) | 4139 | Won |
| 2016 | Quilandy | N.Subramanian (INC) | 13369 | Won |

== Personal life ==
Son of Shri Kunhiraman and Smt. Kalliani, born at Viyyur, Quilandy Taluk, on 1 December 1952. He studied till S.S.L.C. He was married to Smt. E. Sulochana, the couple have a son and a daughter.
