= K. V. Abdul Khader =

Indian politician

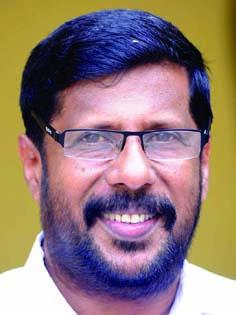
K. V. Abdul Khader

K. V. Abdul Khader is a Communist Party of India (Marxist) (CPI(M)) politician from Thrissur and a member of the Kerala Legislative Assembly for the Guruvayoor constituency.

He is the son of K. V. Abu and Pathu and was born at Blangad on 6 June 1964. He is a photographer and political worker.

He was an active member of the Left Front as a youth. Likewise, he was district president of Thrissur, state committee member of DYFI, and area secretary of CPI(M). He was a reporter of Deshabhimani for a decade and was chairman of the Kerala State Wakf Board, first chairman of the Committee for the Welfare of Non-Resident Keralites, Kerala Legislative Assembly.

He is now CPIM Thrissur District Secretary. Furthermore, he was elected to the Kerala Legislative Assembly in 2006, 2011 and 2016.
