= B. D. Devassy =

Indian politician

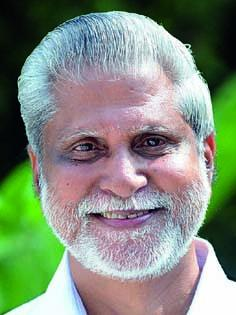

Brahmakulath Devassy Devassy is a Communist Party of India (Marxist) politician from Thrissur and was Member of the Kerala Legislative Assembly from Chalakudy Assembly Constituency.

== Early life ==
He is born in to Mariyam and Devassy of the Brahmakulath house. He started his political career by being the Congress president of Marangattupilly ward. He is married to Brijitha, and has two sons.
