= K. Kunhiraman =

Indian politician

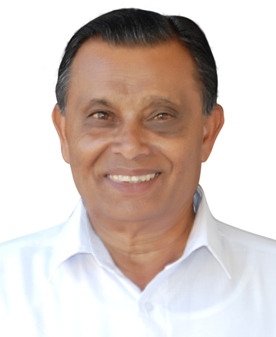

Member of Kerala Legislative Assembly
- In office 14 May 2011 – 3 May 2021
- Preceded by: K. V. Kunhiraman
- Succeeded by: C. H. Kunhambu
- Constituency: Udma

Personal details
- Born: 28 February 1948 (age 78) Alakkode, Kasaragod district, Kerala, India
- Party: CPI(M)
- Spouse: P. Padmini
- Children: 2 sons and 1 daughter
- Website: facebook

K. Kunhiraman (born 28 February 1948) is an Indian politician from Kasaragod, Kerala. He is the ex-MLA (Member of Legislative Assembly) representing Udma constituency. Additionally, he is a District Committee member of Communist Party of India (Marxist) (CPI(M)).

== Family and early life ==
K. Kunhiraman was born on 28 February 1948, the son of Chandu Maniyani and Kunhamma Amma, at Alakott in Kasaragod district of the state of Kerala, India in a middle-class family. His father Chandu Maniyani was a farmer, and his mother Kunhamma was a housewife.
