= P. Ubaidulla =

Indian politician

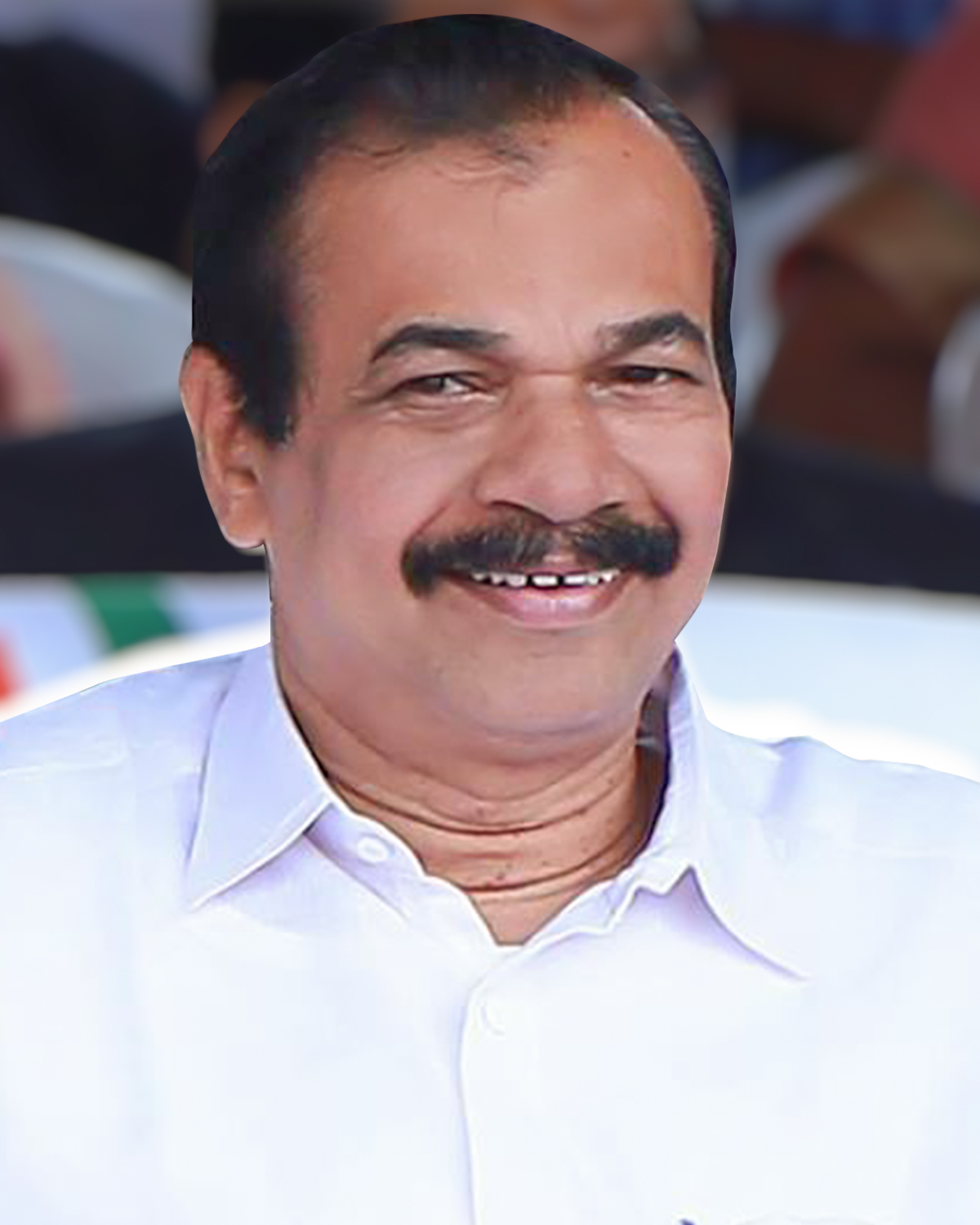

Member of Kerala Legislative Assembly
- In office 2011–2026
- Preceded by: M. Ummer
- Succeeded by: P. K. Kunhalikutty
- Constituency: Malappuram

Personal details
- Born: 31 January 1960 (age 66) Anakkayam
- Party: Indian Union Muslim League
- Spouse: Hafsath
- Children: 4

P. Ubaidulla is a member of 15th Kerala Legislative Assembly. He is a member of Indian Union Muslim League and represented Malappuram constituency from 2011 to 2026..

== Positions held ==
- Secretary , IUML Kerala State
- Member of 13,14 and 15th Kerala Legislative Assembly (2011–16, 2016–21,2021-26)
- Member, Kerala State Waqf Board (2019–2026)
- Member, District Council, Malappuram (1991–95)
- Member, District Panchayat (1995-2000 & 2000-2005)
- General Secretary, Muslim Youth League Malappuram District Committee
- President, Muslim League Malappuram Constituency Committee
- Working Committee Member, Kerala State Muslim League
- President, Co-operative Employees Organisation (C.E.O.) State Committee
- General Secretary, C.H. Centre, Malappuram
