= 2016 Kerala Legislative Assembly election =

Elections for the 14th Legislative Assembly of Kerala

- 16 May 2016
- Turnout: 77.53% (▲2.27 pp)
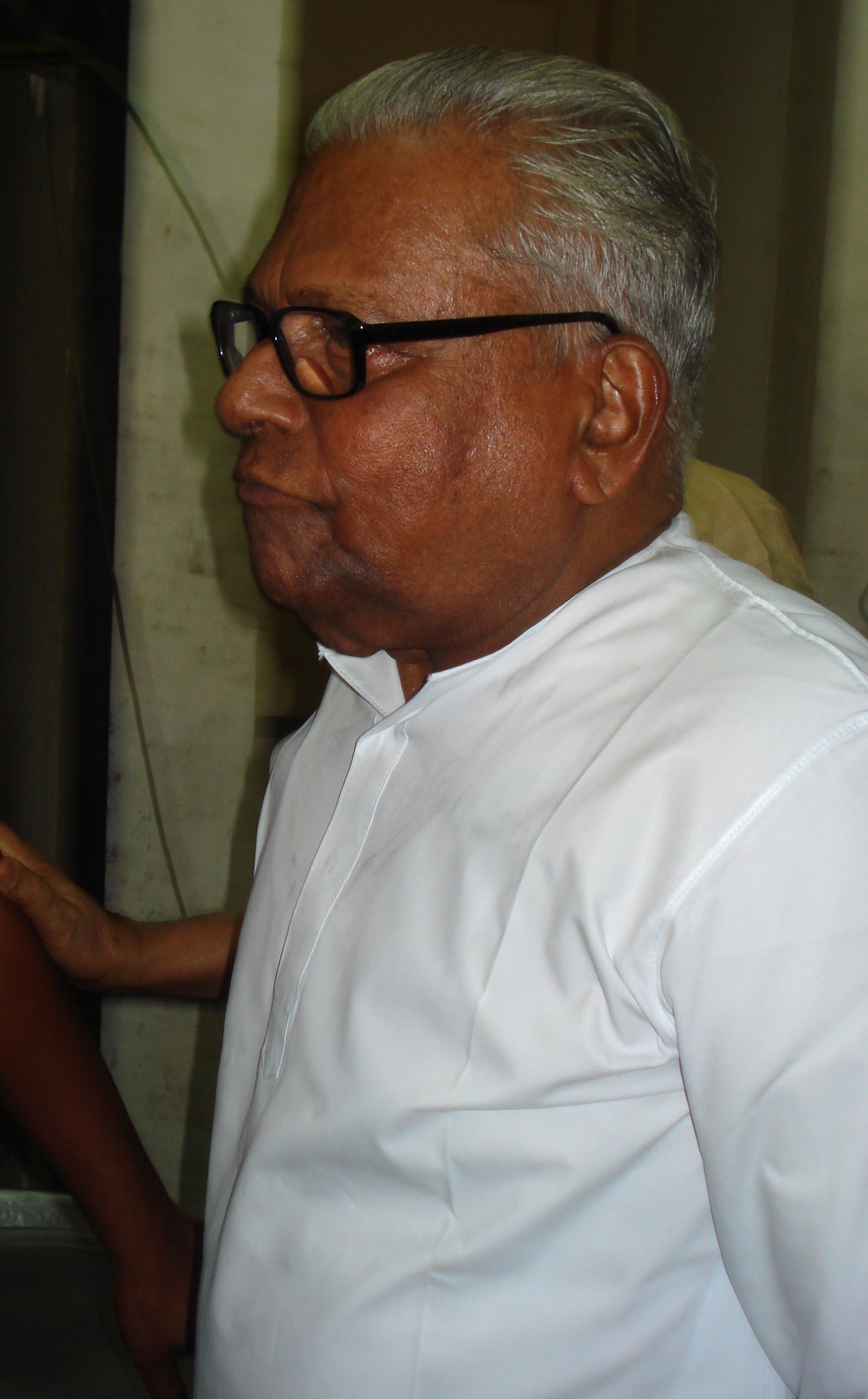

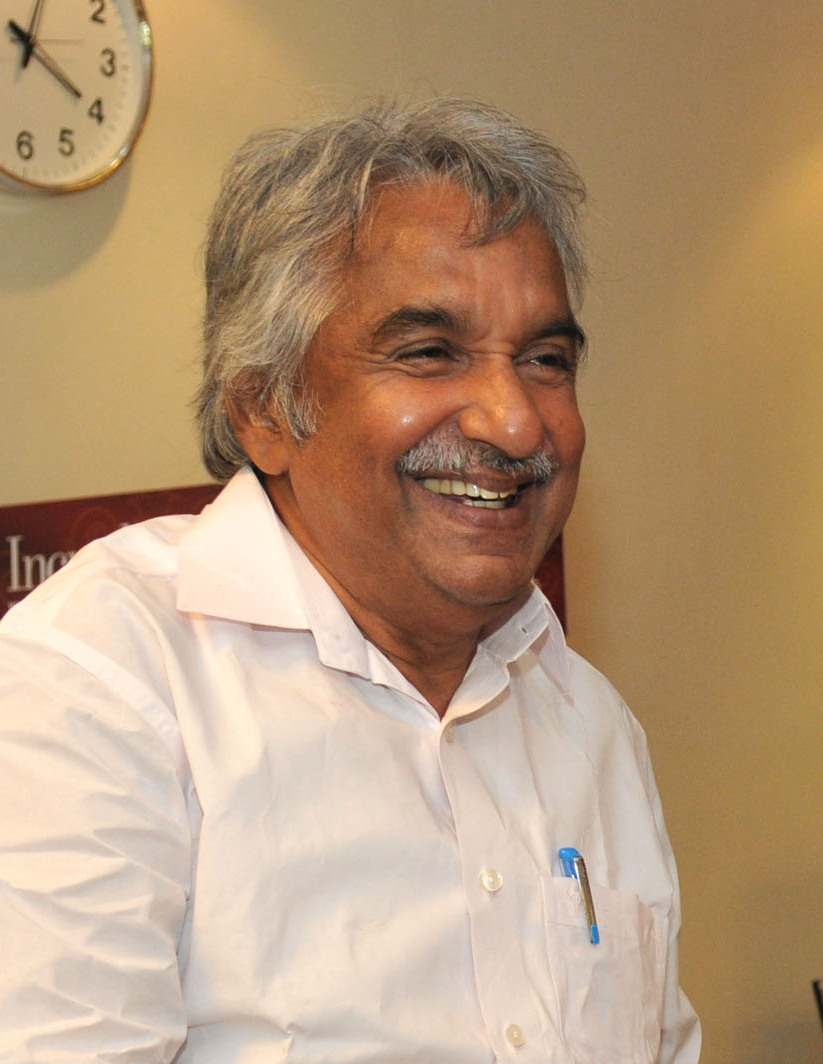

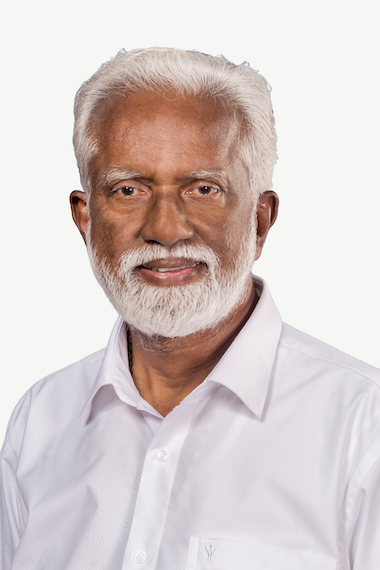
	First party	Second party	Third party
Leader	V. S. Achutanandan	Oommen Chandy	Kummanam Rajasekharan
Party	CPI(M)	INC	BJP
Alliance	LDF	UDF	NDA
Leader since	2016	2004	2015
Leader's seat	Malampuzha (won)	Puthuppally	Did not contest
Last election	44.94%, 45 seats	45.83%, 38 seats	6.03%, 0 seats
Seats won	58	22	1
Seat change	▲13	▼16	▲1
Coalition vote		7,741,293	2,129,726
Percentage	43.48%	38.81%	10.53%
Swing	▼1.63 pp	▼6.97 pp	▲4.50 pp

Chief Minister before election
Oommen Chandy
INC
Elected Chief Minister
Pinarayi Vijayan
CPI(M)

The 2016 Kerala Legislative Assembly election was held on 16 May 2016 to elect 140 MLAs to the 14th Kerala Legislative Assembly.

The constituencies to which election was held

Voter turnout was 77.53%, up from 75.12% in the previous election. The result was declared on 19 May 2016. The Left Democratic Front (LDF), led by Communist Party of India (Marxist) (CPI(M)), won the election, defeating the incumbent United Democratic Front (UDF), led by the Indian National Congress (INC), which could only win 47 seats in the election. Pinarayi Vijayan was sworn in as the Chief Minister on 25 May.

== Background ==
The tenure of the members of the Legislative Assembly in the state was to end on 31 May 2016. As per the voters list published on 14 January 2016, there were around 2.60 crore (26 million) eligible voters including 6.18 lakh (618,000) new voters in the age group 18–21. Elections to the 140-member assembly were held in 21,498 polling stations set up at 12,038 locations. There were 500 model polling stations. Systematic Voters' Education and Electoral Participation (SVEEP) programme was undertaken in Kerala to raise voter awareness.

Final voters list for Kerala Legislative Assembly election 2016
Group of voters	Voters population
Male	12,510,580
Female	13,508,702
Third gender	2
Total voters	26,019,284

2,065 Voter-verified paper audit trail (VVPAT) units were used by the Election Commission in 1,650 polling stations in 12 constituencies. VVPAT were not used in Idukki, Pathanamthitta, Wayanad and Kasaragod districts. The Election Commission launched several mobile apps.

Assembly constituencies of Kerala having VVPAT facility with EVMs
Kannur	Kozhikode North	Malappuram
Palakkad	Thrissur	Kottayam
Alappuzha	Kollam	Vattiyoorkkavu
Nemom	Ernakulam	Thrikkakkara

== Parties and coalitions ==
There are two major political coalitions in Kerala. The Left Democratic Front (LDF) is the coalition of the left-wing and far-left parties, led by the Communist Party of India (Marxist) (CPI(M)). The United Democratic Front (UDF) is the coalition of centrist and centre-left parties led by the Indian National Congress.

=== Left Democratic Front (Kerala) ===
Left Democratic Front (Kerala)

Party	Flag	Symbol	Photo	Leader	Seats contested	Male	Female
Communist Party of India (Marxist)				Kodiyeri Balakrishnan	90	78	12
Communist Party of India				Kanam Rajendran	25	21	4
Janata Dal (Secular)		Janata Dal Election Symbol		Mathew T. Thomas	5	4	1
Janathipathiya Samrakshana Samithy					4	4	0
Nationalist Congress Party				T. P. Peethambaran	4	4	0
Janadhipathya Kerala Congress				Francis George	4	4	0
Indian National League				S. A. Puthiya Valappil	3	3	0
Kerala Congress (B)				R. Balakrishna Pillai	1	1	0
Kerala Congress (Skaria Thomas)				Skariah Thomas	1	1	0
Communist Marxist Party (Aravindakshan)				K. R. Aravindakshan	1	1	0
Revolutionary Socialist Party (Leninist)				Kovoor Kunjumon	1	1	0
Congress (Secular)				Kadannappalli Ramachandran	1	1	0

=== United Democratic Front (Kerala) ===
United Democratic Front (Kerala)

Party	Flag	Symbol	Photo	Leader	Contesting Seats	Male Candidates	Female Candidates
Indian National Congress (Indira)				V. M. Sudheeran	87	78	9
Indian Union Muslim League				Sayed Hyderali Shihab Thangal	24	24	0
Kerala Congress (Mani)				K. M. Mani	15	15	0
Janata Dal (United)				M. P. Veerendra Kumar	7	7	0
Revolutionary Socialist Party				A. A. Aziz	5	5	0
Communist Marxist Party				C. P. John	1	1	0
Kerala Congress (Jacob)				Anoop Jacob	1	1	0

=== National Democratic Alliance ===
National Democratic Alliance

Party	Flag	Symbol	Photo	Leader	Contesting Seats	Male Candidates	Female Candidates
Bharatiya Janata Party				Kummanam Rajasekharan	98	88	10
Bharath Dharma Jana Sena				Thushar Vellappally	36	35	1
Kerala Congress (Thomas)				P. C. Thomas	4	4	0
Janadhipathya Samrakshana Samithi (Rajan Babu)				A. N. Rajan Babu	1	1	0
Janadhipathya Rashtriya Sabha				C. K. Janu	1	0	1

=== Left United Front ===
Party	Flag	Symbol	Photo	Leader	Seats contested	Male	Female
Revolutionary Marxist Party				N. Venu	10	9	1
Socialist Unity Centre of India (Communist)				C. K. Lukose	32	27	5
Marxist Communist Party of India (United)				M. Rajan			

=== Parties not in any coalition ===
Party	Flag	Symbol	Photo	Leader	Contested Seats
Social Democratic Party of India				K. M. Ashraf	88
Bahujan Samaj Party				J. Sudhakaran	74
Peoples Democratic Party				Abdul Nasar Madani	60
Welfare Party of India				Hameed Vaniyambalam	41
Communist Party of India (Marxist-Leninist) Red Star				M. K. Dasan	18
Shiv Sena				M.S. Bhuvanachandran	16
Samajwadi Party				N. O. Kuttappan	9
All India Anna Dravida Munnetra Kazhagam				A. L. Pradeep	7
Ambedkarite Party of India					5
Indian Gandhiyan Party					3
Kerala Janatha Party					3
Communist Party of India (Marxist-Leninist) Liberation				Dipankar Bhattacharya	1

== List of Candidates ==
Constituency		LDF		UDF		NDA	
#	Name	Party	Candidate	Party	Candidate	Party	Candidate
1	Manjeshwar	CPI(M)	C. H. Kunhambu	IUML	P. B. Abdul Razak	BJP	K. Surendran
2	Kasaragod	INL	A. A. Ameen	IUML	N. A. Nellikkunnu	BJP	Ravisha Thantri Kuntar
3	Udma	CPI(M)	K. V. Kunhiraman	INC	K. Sudhakaran	BJP	K. Shreekanth
4	Kanhangad	CPI	E. Chandrasekharan	INC	Dhanya Suresh	BDJS	M. P. Raghavan
5	Trikaripur	CPI(M)	M. Rajagopalan	INC	K. P. Kunhikannan	BJP	M. Bhaskaran
6	Payyannur	CPI(M)	C. Krishnan	INC	Sajid Mavval	BJP	Aniamma Teacher
7	Kalliasseri	CPI(M)	T. V. Rajesh	INC	Amritha Ramakrishnan	BJP	K. P. Arun Master
8	Taliparamba	CPI(M)	James Mathew	KC(M)	Rajesh Nambiar	BJP	P. Balakrishnan Master
9	Irikkur	CPI	K. T. Jose	INC	K. C. Joseph	BJP	A. P. Gangadharan
10	Azhikode	CPI(M)	M. V. Nikesh Kumar	IUML	K. M. Shaji	BJP	A. V. Kesavan
11	Kannur	Cong(S)	K. Ramachandran	INC	Satheeshan Pacheni	BJP	K. G. Babu
12	Dharmadam	CPI(M)	Pinarayi Vijayan	INC	Mambaram Divakaran	BJP	Mohanan Mananthery
13	Thalassery	CPI(M)	A. N. Shamseer	INC	A. P. Abdullakutty	BJP	V. K. Sajeevan
14	Kuthuparamba	CPI(M)	K. K. Shailaja	JD(U)	K. P. Mohanan	BJP	C. Sadanandan Master
15	Mattannur	CPI(M)	E. P. Jayarajan	JD(U)	K. P. Prasanth	BJP	Biju Elakkuzhi
16	Peravoor	CPI(M)	Binoy Kurian	INC	Sunny Joseph	BDJS	Paily Vathiattu
17	Mananthavady (ST)	CPI(M)	O. R. Kelu	INC	P. K. Jayalakshmi	BJP	K. Mohandas
18	Sulthanbathery (ST)	CPI(M)	Rugmini Subrahmanian	INC	I. C. Balakrishnan	IND	C. K. Janu (Note: Janadhipathya Rashtriya Sabha candidate C. K. Janu contested as Independent Candidate with support of NDA)
19	Kalpetta	CPI(M)	C. K. Saseendran	JD(U)	M. V. Shreyams Kumar	BJP	K. Sadanandan
20	Vadakara	JD(S)	C. K. Nanu	JD(U)	Manayath Chandran	BJP	M. Rajeshkumar
21	Kuttiadi	CPI(M)	K. K. Lathika	IUML	Parakkal Abdulla	BJP	Ramadas Manaleri
22	Nadapuram	CPI	E. K. Vijayan	INC	Praveen Kumar	BJP	M. P. Rajan
23	Quilandy	CPI(M)	K. Dasan	INC	N. Subramanian	BJP	K. Rajinesh Babu
24	Perambra	CPI(M)	T. P. Ramakrishnan	KC(M)	Mohammed Ikbal	BDJS	Sukumaran Nair
25	Balusseri (SC)	CPI(M)	Purushan Kadalundy	IND	U. C. Raman	BJP	P. K. Supran
26	Elathur	NCP	A. K. Saseendran	JD(U)	Kishen Chand	BJP	Rajan Nair
27	Kozhikode North	CPI(M)	A. Pradeepkumar	INC	P. M. Suresh Babu	BJP	K. P. Sreesan
28	Kozhikode South	INL	A. P. Abdul Vahab	IUML	M. K. Muneer	BDJS	Satheesh Kuttiyil
29	Beypore	CPI(M)	V. K. C. Mammed Koya	INC	M. P. Adam Mulsi	BJP	Prakasan
30	Kunnamangalam	IND	P. T. A. Rahim	INC	T. Siddique	BJP	C. K. Padmanabhan
31	Koduvally	IND	Karat Razak	IUML	M. A. Razak Master	BJP	Ali Akbar
32	Thiruvambady	CPI(M)	George M. Thomas	IUML	V. M. Ummer Master	BDJS	Giri Pambanal
33	Kondotty	IND	K. P. Beerankutty	IUML	T. V. Ibrahim	BJP	K. Ramachandran
34	Eranad	IND	K. T. Abdurahiman	IUML	P. K. Basheer	BJP	K. P. Baburaj Thundathil
35	Nilambur	IND	P. V. Anvar	INC	Aryadan Shoukath	BDJS	Girish Mekkatt
36	Wandoor (SC)	CPI(M)	K. Nishanth	INC	A. P. Anil Kumar	BJP	Sunitha Mohandas
37	Manjeri	CPI	K. Mohandas	IUML	M. Ummer	BJP	C. Dinesh
38	Perinthalmanna	CPI(M)	V. Sasikumar	IUML	Manjalamkuzhi Ali	BJP	M. K. Sunil
39	Mankada	CPI(M)	T. K. Rasheed Ali	IUML	T. A. Ahmed Kabir	BJP	B. Ratheesh
40	Malappuram	CPI(M)	K. P. Sumathi	IUML	P. Ubaidulla	BJP	K. N. Badusha Thangal
41	Vengara	CPI(M)	P. P. Basheer	IUML	P. K. Kunhalikutty	BJP	P. T. Ali Haji
42	Vallikkunnu	INL	O. K. Thangal	IUML	P. Abdul Hameed	BJP	Janachandran Master
43	Tirurangadi	IND	Niyas Pulikkalakath	IUML	P. K. Abdu Rabb	BJP	P. V. Geetha Madhavan
44	Tanur	NSC	V. Abdurahiman	IUML	Abdurahiman Randathani	BJP	P. R. Rasmilnath
45	Tirur	NSC	Gafoor P. Lillis	IUML	C. Mammutty	BJP	M. K. Devidasan
46	Kottakkal	NCP	N. A. Muhammed Kutty	IUML	Abid Thangal	BJP	V. Unnikrishnan Master
47	Thavanur	IND	K. T. Jaleel	INC	Ifthiquarudheen Master	BJP	Ravi Thelath
48	Ponnani	CPI(M)	P. Sreeramakrishnan	INC	P. T. Ajay Mohan	BJP	K. K. Surendran
49	Thrithala	CPI(M)	Subaida Ishac	INC	V. T. Balram	BJP	V. T. Rema
50	Pattambi	CPI	Muhammed Muhsin	INC	C. P. Mohammed	BJP	P. Manoj
51	Shornur	CPI(M)	P. K. Sasi	INC	C. Sangeetha	BDJS	V. P. Chandran
52	Ottapalam	CPI(M)	P. Unni	INC	Shanimol Osman	BJP	P. Venugopalan
53	Kongad (SC)	CPI(M)	K. V. Vijayadas	INC	Pandalam Sudhakaran	BJP	Renu Suresh
54	Mannarkkad	CPI	K. P. Suresh Raj	IUML	N. Samsudheen	BDJS	Kesavadev Puthumana
55	Malampuzha	CPI(M)	V. S. Achuthanandan	INC	V. S. Joy	BJP	C. Krishnakumar
56	Palakkad	CPI(M)	N. N. Krishnadas	INC	Shafi Parambil	BJP	Sobha Surendran
57	Tarur (SC)	CPI(M)	A. K. Balan	INC	C. Prakash	BJP	K. V. Divakaran
58	Chittur	JD(S)	K. Krishnankutty	INC	K. Achuthan	BJP	M. M. Sasikumar
59	Nenmara	CPI(M)	K. Babu	INC	A. V. Gopinathan	BJP	N. Sivarajan
60	Alathur	CPI(M)	K. D. Prasenan	KC(M)	K. Kusalakumar	BJP	M. P. Sreekumar
61	Chelakkara (SC)	CPI(M)	U. R. Pradeep	INC	Thulasi	BJP	P. P. Shajumon
62	Kunnamkulam	CPI(M)	A. C. Moideen	CMP	C. P. John	BJP	K. K. Aneeshkumar
63	Guruvayoor	CPI(M)	K. V. Abdul Khader	IUML	P. M. Sadiqali	BJP	Nivedida
64	Manalur	CPI(M)	Murali Perunelly	INC	O. Abdu Rahimankutty	BJP	A. N. Radhakrishnan
65	Wadakkanchery	CPI(M)	Mary Thomas	INC	Anil Akkara	BJP	Ullas Babu
66	Ollur	CPI	K. Rajan	INC	M. P. Vincent	BDJS	P. K. Santhosh
67	Thrissur	CPI	V. S. Sunil Kumar	INC	Padmaja Venugopal	BJP	B. Gopalakrishnan
68	Nattika (SC)	CPI	Geetha Gopi	INC	K. V. Dasan	BDJS	T. V. Babu
69	Kaipamangalam	CPI	E. T. Taison	RSP	M. T. Muhammed Nahas	BDJS	Unnikrishnan Thashnath
70	Irinjalakkuda	CPI(M)	K. U. Arunan	KC(M)	Thomas Unniyadan	BJP	Santhosh Cherakulam
71	Puthukkad	CPI(M)	C. Raveendranath	INC	Sundaran Kunnathully	BJP	A. Nagesh
72	Chalakkudy	CPI(M)	B. D. Devassy	INC	T. U. Radhakrishnan	BDJS	K. A. Unnikrishnan
73	Kodungallur	CPI	V. R. Sunil Kumar	INC	K. P. Dhanapalan	BDJS	Sangeetha
74	Perumbavoor	CPI(M)	Saju Paul	INC	Eldhose Kunnappilly	BJP	E. S. Biju
75	Angamaly	JD(S)	Benny Moonjely	INC	Roji M. John	KEC	P. J. Babu
76	Aluva	CPI(M)	V. Saleem	INC	Anwar Sadath	BJP	Latha Gangadharan
77	Kalamassery	CPI(M)	A. M. Yousaf	IUML	V. K. Ebrahimkunju	BDJS	V. Gopakumar
78	Paravur	CPI	Sarada Mohan	INC	V. D. Satheesan	BDJS	Hari Vijayan
79	Vypen	CPI(M)	S. Sharma	INC	K. R. Subhash	BDJS	K. K. Vamalochanan
80	Kochi	CPI(M)	K. J. Maxi	INC	Dominic Presentation	BJP	Praveen Dhamodara Prabhu
81	Thripunithura	CPI(M)	M. Swaraj	INC	K. Babu	BJP	Thuravoor Viswambharan
82	Eranakulam	CPI(M)	M. Anil Kumar	INC	Hibi Eden	BJP	N. K. Mohandas
83	Thrikkakara	CPI(M)	Sebastian Paul	INC	P. T. Thomas	BJP	S. Saji
84	Kunnathunad (SC)	CPI(M)	Shiji Sivaji	INC	V. P. Sajeendran	BDJS	Thuravoor Suresh
85	Piravom	CPI(M)	M. J. Jacob	KC(J)	Anoop Jacob	BDJS	C. P. Sathyan
86	Muvattupuzha	CPI	Eldo Abraham	INC	Joseph Vazhackan	BJP	P. J. Thomas
87	Kothamangalam	CPI(M)	Antony John	KC(M)	T. U. Kuruvilla	IND	P. C. Cyriac
88	Devikulam (SC)	CPI(M)	S. Rajendran	INC	A. K. Mony	BJP	N. Chandran
89	Udumbanchola	CPI(M)	M. M. Mani	INC	Senapathy Venu	BDJS	Saji Parambath
90	Thodupuzha	IND	Roy Varicattu	KC(M)	P. J. Joseph	BDJS	S. Praveen
91	Idukki	IND	K. Francis George	KC(M)	Roshy Augustine	BDJS	Biju Madhavan
92	Peerumade	CPI	E. S. Bijimol	INC	Adv. Syriac Thomas	BJP	Kumar
93	Pala	NCP	Mani C. Kappan	KC(M)	K. M. Mani	BJP	N. Hari
94	Kaduthuruthy	KC(ST)	Skariah Thomas	KC(M)	Mons Joseph	KEC	Stephen Chazhikadan
95	Vaikom (SC)	CPI	C. K. Asha	INC	A. Saneeshkumar	BDJS	N. K. Neelakandan Master
96	Ettumanoor	CPI(M)	K. Suresh Kurup	KC(M)	Thomas Chazhikadan	BDJS	A. G. Thankappan
97	Kottayam	CPI(M)	Reji Sakhariya	INC	T. Radhakrishnan	BJP	M. S. Karunakaran
98	Puthuppally	CPI(M)	Jaick C. Thomas	INC	Oommen Chandy	BJP	George Kurian
99	Changanassery	IND	K. C. Joseph	KC(M)	C. F. Thomas	BJP	Ettumanoor Radhakrishnan
100	Kanjirappally	CPI	V. B. Binu	KC(M)	N. Jayaraj	BJP	V. N. Manoj
101	Poonjar	IND	P. C. George	KC(M)	Georgekutty Augusty	BDJS	M. R. Ullas
102	Aroor	CPI(M)	A. M. Ariff	INC	C. R. Jayaprakash	BDJS	Aniyappan
103	Cherthala	CPI	P. Thilothaman	INC	S. Sarath	BDJS	P. S. Rajeev
104	Alappuzha	CPI(M)	T. M. Thomas Isaac	INC	Laly Vincent	BJP	Ranjith Sreenivas
105	Ambalapuzha	CPI(M)	G. Sudhakaran	JD(U)	Shaik. P. Harriz	BJP	L. P. Jayachandran
106	Kuttanad	NCP	Thomas Chandy	KC(M)	Jacob Abraham	BDJS	Subash Vasu
107	Haripad	CPI	P. Prasad	INC	Ramesh Chennithala	BJP	D. Aswanidev
108	Kayamkulam	CPI(M)	U. Prathibha	INC	M. Liju	BDJS	Shaji. M. Panicker
109	Mavelikara (SC)	CPI(M)	R. Rajesh	INC	Baiju Kalasala	BJP	P. M. Velayudhan
110	Chengannur	CPI(M)	K. K. Ramachandran Nair	INC	P. C. Vishnunadh	BJP	P. S. Sreedharan Pillai
111	Thiruvalla	JD(S)	Mathew T. Thomas	KC(M)	Joseph M. Puthussery	BDJS	Akkeraman K. Bhattathiripad
112	Ranni	CPI(M)	Raju Abraham	INC	Mariamma Cherian	BDJS	K. M. Padmakumar
113	Aranmula	CPI(M)	Veena George	INC	K. Sivadasan Nair	BJP	M. T. Ramesh
114	Konni	CPI(M)	R. Sanal Kumar	INC	Adoor Prakash	BJP	D. Asoka Kumar
115	Adoor (SC)	CPI	Chittayam Gopakumar	INC	K. K. Shaju	BJP	P. Sudheer
116	Karunagappally	CPI	R. Ramachandran	INC	C. R. Mahesh	BDJS	V. Sadasivan
117	Chavara	CMP(A)	Vijayan Pillai	RSP	Shibu Baby John	BJP	M. Sunil
118	Kunnathur (SC)	IND	Kovoor Kunjumon	RSP	Ullas Kovur	BDJS	Thazhava Sahadevan
119	Kottarakkara	CPI(M)	P. Aisha Potty	INC	Savin Sathyan	BJP	Rajeswary Rajendran
120	Pathanapuram	KC(B)	K. B. Ganesh Kumar	INC	P. V. Jagadish Kumar	BJP	Reghu Damodharan
121	Punalur	CPI	K. Raju	IUML	A. Younus Kunju	KEC	Sisil Fernandes
122	Chadayamangalam	CPI	Mullakkara Retnakaran	INC	M. M. Naseer	BJP	K. Sivadasan
123	Kundara	CPI(M)	J. Mercykutty Amma	INC	Rajmohan Unnithan	BJP	M. S. Syam Kumar
124	Kollam	CPI(M)	M. Mukesh	INC	Sooraj Ravi	IND	K. Sasikumar
125	Eravipuram	CPI(M)	M. Noushad	RSP	A. A. Aziz	BDJS	Akkavila Satheek
126	Chathannur	CPI	G. S. Jayalal	INC	Sooranad Rajasekharan	BJP	B. B. Gopakumar
127	Varkala	CPI(M)	V. Joy	INC	Varkala Kahar	BDJS	S. R. M. Aji
128	Attingal (SC)	CPI(M)	B. Satyan	RSP	K. Chandrababu	BJP	Raji Prasad
129	Chirayinkeezhu (SC)	CPI	V. Sasi	INC	K. S. Ajith Kumar	BJP	Dr. P. P. Vava
130	Nedumangad	CPI	C. Divakaran	INC	Palode Ravi	BJP	V. V. Rajesh
131	Vamanapuram	CPI(M)	D. K. Murali	INC	T. Sarathchandra Prasad	BDJS	R. V. Nikhil
132	Kazhakkoottam	CPI(M)	Kadakampally Surendran	INC	M. A. Vaheed	BJP	V. Muraleedharan
133	Vattiyoorkavu	CPI(M)	T. N. Seema	INC	K. Muraleedharan	BJP	Kummanam Rajasekharan
134	Thiruvananthapuram	IND	Antony Raju	INC	V. S. Sivakumar	BJP	S. Sreesanth
135	Nemom	CPI(M)	V. Sivankutty	JD(U)	V. Surendran Pillai	BJP	O. Rajagopal
136	Aruvikkara	CPI(M)	A. A. Rasheed	INC	K. S. Sabarinadhan	BJP	Rajasenan
137	Parassala	CPI(M)	C. K. Hareendran	INC	A. T. George	BJP	Jayachandran Nair
138	Kattakkada	CPI(M)	I. B. Sathish	INC	N. Sakthan	BJP	P. K. Krishnadas
139	Kovalam	JD(S)	Jameela Prakasam	INC	M. Vincent	BDJS	Kovalam T. N. Suresh
140	Neyyattinkara	CPI(M)	K. Ansalan	INC	R. Selvaraj	BJP	Punchakkari Surendran

== Opinion polls ==
When conducted	Ref	Polling organisation/Agency	Sample size						
When conducted	Ref	Polling organisation/Agency	Sample size	UDF		LDF		OTH	
When conducted	Ref	Polling organisation/Agency	Sample size	Seats	Vote %	Seats	Vote %	seats	Vote %
March 2016		C-FORE for Asianet News	15778	55–62	37%	75–82	41%	3–5	18%
March 2016		India TV C-Voter	N/A	49	N/A	89	N/A	2	N/A
April 2016		Mathrbhumi News – Axis My India	N/A	66–72	42%	68–74	45%	0–2	10%
23 April 2016		Asianet News – C4 Election Survey	50000	56–62	37%	75–81	40%	3–5	18%
May 2016		Mars agency	7020	70–75	N/A	63–67	N/A	0	N/A
May 2016		IMEG Opinion Poll	60000	50–57	N/A	83–90	N/A	0	N/A
May 2016		People TV – CES Survey	17460	51–59	40.6%	81–89	43.1%	0–3	14.1%

=== Exit polls ===
Agency	LDF	UDF	Others	Ref.
Times Now-C Voter	74–82	54–62	0–8	
India Today-Axis	88–101	38–48	1–7	
News Nation	67–71	68–72	0–2	
Today's Chanakya	75±9	57±9	8±5	

== Election Day ==
Voting took place on 16 May 2016 in all 140 Legislative Assembly Constituencies. The final turnout was 77.35%.

Districts	Voter Turnout	
District wise map of Kerala	District	%
	Kasaragod	78.51
	Kannur	80.63
	Wayanad	78.22
	Kozhikode	81.89
	Malappuram	75.83
	Palakkad	78.37
	Thrissur	77.74
	Ernakulam	79.77
	Idukki	73.59
	Kottayam	76.90
	Alappuzha	79.88
	Pathanamthitta	71.66
	Kollam	75.07
	Thiruvananthapuram	72.53
Total	77.35	

== Results ==
Vote Share by alliance
1. LDF (43.5%)
2. UDF (38.8%)
3. NDA (15.0%)
4. Other (2.75%)
Seat Share by alliance
1. LDF (65.0%)
2. UDF (33.6%)
3. NDA (0.71%)
4. Other (0.72%)

The Left Democratic Front won in a landslide in terms of seats, winning 91 out of 140 seats in the legislature. The incumbent UDF front was defeated and was reduced to 47 seats. The NDA, and independent P. C. George won one seat each.

=== By alliance ===
LDF	SEATS	UDF	SEATS	NDA	SEATS	Other	SEATS
CPI(M)	58	INC	22	BJP	1	P. C. George (IND)	1
CPI	19	IUML	18	BDJS	0		
JD(S)	3	KC(M)	6	KEC	0		
NCP	2	KC(J)	1	JRS	0		
IND	5	JD(U)	0	JSS (Rajan Babu)	0		
C(S)	1	RSP	0				
KC(B)	1						
NSC	1						
CMP	1						
KC	0						
JKC	0						
INL	0						
Total	91	Total	47	Total	1	Total	1
Change	+23	Change	-25	Change	+1	Change	+1

P.C. George, who contested as an independent candidate from Poonjar, joined the NDA on a later date.

=== By region ===
Region wise map of Kerala	Region	Seats				
Region wise map of Kerala	Region	Seats	UDF	LDF	NDA	OTH
	North Kerala	32	8	24	—N/a	—N/a
	Central Kerala	55	25	30	—N/a	—N/a
	South Kerala	53	14	37	1	1
	Total	140	47	91	1	1

=== By district ===
District wise map of Kerala	District	Seats				
District wise map of Kerala	District	Seats	UDF	LDF	NDA	OTH
	Kasaragod	5	2	3	—N/a	—N/a
	Kannur	11	3	8	—N/a	—N/a
	Wayanad	3	1	2	—N/a	—N/a
	Kozhikode	13	2	11	—N/a	—N/a
	Malappuram	16	12	4	—N/a	—N/a
	Palakkad	12	3	9	—N/a	—N/a
	Thrissur	13	1	12	—N/a	—N/a
	Ernakulam	14	9	5	—N/a	—N/a
	Idukki	5	2	3	—N/a	—N/a
	Kottayam	9	6	2	—N/a	1
	Alappuzha	9	1	8	—N/a	—N/a
	Pathanamthitta	5	1	4	—N/a	—N/a
	Kollam	11	—N/a	11	—N/a	—N/a
	Thiruvananthapuram	14	4	9	1	—N/a
	Total	140	47	91	1	1

=== Results by party ===
Parties and coalitions	Popular vote		Seats	
Parties and coalitions	Votes	%	Candidates	Won
Communist Party of India (Marxist)	5,365,472	26.7	84	59
Indian National Congress	4,794,793	23.8	87	21
Bharatiya Janata Party	2,129,726	10.6	98	1
Communist Party of India	1,643,878	8.2	25	19
Indian Union Muslim League	1,496,864	7.4	23	18
Kerala Congress (Mani)	807,718	4.0	15	5
Bharath Dharma Jana Sena	795,797	4.0	36	0
Independents (LDF)	487,510	2.4	8	4
Janata Dal (United)	296,585	1.5	7	0
Janata Dal (Secular)	293,274	1.5	5	3
Nationalist Congress Party	237,408	1.2	4	2
Independents (IND)	220,797	1.1	420	1
Revolutionary Socialist Party	216,071	1.1	5	0
Kerala Congress (Democratic)	157,584	0.78	4	0
National Secular Conference	130,843	0.65	2	1
Revolutionary Socialist Party (Leninist)	75,725	0.38	1	1
Kerala Congress (Balakrishna Pillai)	74,429	0.37	1	1
Kerala Congress (Jacob)	73,770	0.37	1	1
Communist Marxist Party (Aravindakshan)	64,666	0.32	1	1
Congress (Secular)	54,347	0.27	1	1
Total	20,232,718	100.00	1,203	140
Valid votes	20,232,718	99.97		
Invalid votes	6,107	0.03		
Votes cast / turnout	20,238,825	77.53		
Abstentions	5,866,244	22.47		
Registered voters	26,105,069			

=== Results by constituency ===
Constituency		Winner					Runner-up					Margin
No.	Name	Candidate	Party	Alliance	Votes	%	Candidate	Party	Alliance	Votes	%	Margin
Kasaragod district
1	Manjeshwar	P. B. Abdul Razak	IUML	UDF	56,870	35.79	K. Surendran	BJP	NDA	56,781	35.74	89
2	Kasaragod	N. A. Nellikkunnu	IUML	UDF	64,727	44.72	Ravisha Tantri Kuntar	BJP	NDA	56,120	38.77	8,607
3	Udma	K. Kunhiraman	CPI(M)	LDF	70,679	43.94	K. Sudhakaran	INC	UDF	66,847	41.55	3,832
4	Kanhangad	E. Chandrasekharan	CPI(M)	LDF	80,558	49.98	Dhanya Suresh	INC	UDF	54,547	33.84	26,011
5	Thrikaripur	M. Rajagopalan	CPI(M)	LDF	79,286	50.93	K. P. Kunhikannan	INC	UDF	62,327	40.04	16,959
Kannur district
6	Payyanur	C. Krishnan	CPI(M)	LDF	83,226	58.02	Sajid Mavval	INC	UDF	42,963	29.95	40,263
7	Kalliasseri	T. V. Rajesh	CPI(M)	LDF	83,006	59.83	Amritha Ramakrishnan	INC	UDF	40,115	28.91	42,891
8	Taliparamba	James Mathew	CPI(M)	LDF	91,106	56.95	Rajesh Nambiar	KC(M)	UDF	50,489	31.56	40,617
9	Irikkur	K. C. Joseph	INC	UDF	72,548	49.00	K. T. Jose	CPI	LDF	62,901	42.48	9,647
10	Azhikode	K. M. Shaji	IUML	UDF	63,082	44.58	M. V. Nikesh Kumar	CPI(M)	LDF	60,795	42.97	2,287
11	Kannur	Kadannappalli Ramachandran	Cong(S)	LDF	54,347	43.06	Satheesan Pacheni	INC	UDF	53,151	42.11	1,196
12	Dharmadam	Pinarayi Vijayan	CPI(M)	LDF	87,329	56.84	Mambaram Divakaran	INC	UDF	50,424	32.82	36,905
13	Thalassery	A. N. Shamseer	CPI(M)	LDF	70,741	53.32	A. P. Abdullakutty	INC	UDF	36,624	27.61	34,117
14	Kuthuparamba	K. K. Shailaja	CPI(M)	LDF	67,013	45.64	K. P. Mohanan	JD(U)	UDF	54,722	37.27	12,891
15	Mattanur	E. P. Jayarajan	CPI(M)	LDF	84,030	56.52	K. P. Prashanth	JD(U)	UDF	40,649	27.34	43,381
16	Peravoor	Sunny Joseph	INC	UDF	65,659	48.10	Binoy Kurian	CPI(M)	LDF	57,670	42.25	7,989
Wayanad district
17	Mananthavady (ST)	O. R. Kelu	CPI(M)	LDF	62,436	42.88	P. K. Jayalakshmi	INC	UDF	61,129	41.99	1,307
18	Sulthan Bathery (ST)	I. C. Balakrishnan	INC	UDF	75,747	44.04	Rugmini Subrahmanian	CPI(M)	LDF	64,549	37.53	11,198
19	Kalpetta	C. K. Saseendran	CPI(M)	LDF	72,959	48.35	M. V. Shreyams Kumar	JD(U)	UDF	59,876	39.68	13,083
Kozhikode district
20	Vadakara	C. K. Nanu	JD(S)	LDF	49,211	37.98	Manayath Chandran	JD(U)	UDF	39,700	30.64	9,511
21	Kuttiady	Parakkal Abdulla	IUML	UDF	71,809	45.50	K. K. Lathika	CPI(M)	LDF	70,652	44.77	1,157
22	Nadapuram	E. K. Vijayan	CPI	LDF	74,742	45.87	Praveen Kumar	INC	UDF	69,983	42.95	4,759
23	Quilandy	K. Dasan	CPI(M)	LDF	70,593	45.94	N. Subramanian	INC	UDF	57,224	37.24	13,369
24	Perambra	T. P. Ramakrishnan	CPI(M)	LDF	72,359	47.14	Mohammad Ikbal	KC(M)	UDF	68,258	44.46	4,101
25	Balussery (SC)	Purushan Kadalundi	CPI(M)	LDF	82,914	47.50	U. C. Raman Padanilam	IND	UDF	67,450	38.64	15,464
26	Elathur	A. K. Saseendran	NCP	LDF	76,387	48.65	Kishen Chand	JD(U)	UDF	47,330	30.15	29,057
27	Kozhikode North	A. Pradeep Kumar	CPI(M)	LDF	64,192	48.40	P. M. Suresh Babu	INC	UDF	36,319	27.39	27,873
28	Kozhikode South	M. K. Muneer	IUML	UDF	49,863	43.13	A. P. Abdul Wahab	INL	LDF	43,536	37.66	6,327
29	Beypore	V. K. C. Mammed Koya	CPI(M)	LDF	69,114	44.39	Adam Mulsi M.P.	INC	UDF	54,751	42.69	14,363
30	Kunnamangalam	P. T. A. Rahim	IND	LDF	77,410	42.92	T. Siddique	INC	UDF	66,205	36.71	11,205
31	Koduvally	Karat Razack	IND	LDF	61,033	44.42	M. A. Razack Master	IUML	UDF	60,460	44.01	573
32	Thiruvambady	George M. Thomas	CPI(M)	LDF	62,324	45.93	V. M. Ummer Master	IUML	UDF	59,316	43.72	3,008
Malappuram district
33	Kondotty	T. V. Ibrahim	IUML	UDF	69,668	46.58	K. P. Beerankutty	IND	LDF	59,014	39.46	10,654
34	Eranad	P. K. Basheer	IUML	UDF	69,048	50.83	K. T. Abdurahiman	IND	LDF	56,155	41.34	12,893
35	Nilambur	P. V. Anvar	IND	LDF	77,858	47.91	Aryadan Shoukath	INC	UDF	66,354	40.83	11,504
36	Wandoor (SC)	A. P. Anil Kumar	INC	UDF	81,964	52.59	K. Nishanth	CPI(M)	LDF	58,100	37.28	23,864
37	Manjeri	M. Ummer	IUML	UDF	69,779	50.22	K. Mohandas	CPI	LDF	50,163	36.10	19,616
38	Perinthalmanna	Manjalamkuzhi Ali	IUML	UDF	70,990	46.89	V. Sasikumar	CPI(M)	LDF	70,411	46.50	579
39	Mankada	T. A. Ahmed Kabeer	IUML	UDF	69,165	46.08	T. K. Rasheed Ali	CPI(M)	LDF	67,657	45.07	1,508
40	Malappuram	P. Ubaidulla	IUML	UDF	81,072	57.16	K. P. Sumathi	CPI(M)	LDF	45,400	32.01	36,672
41	Vengara	P. K. Kunhalikutty	IUML	UDF	72,181	60.01	P. P. Basheer	CPI(M)	LDF	34,124	28.37	38,057
42	Valikunnu	Abdul Hameed Master	IUML	UDF	59,720	43.44	O. K. Thangal	INL	LDF	47,110	34.27	12,610
43	Tirurangadi	P. K. Abdu Rabb	IUML	UDF	62,927	46.53	Niyas Pulikkalakath	IND	LDF	56,884	42.06	6,043
44	Tanur	V. Abdurahiman	NSC	LDF	64,772	45.78	Abdurahiman Randathani	IUML	UDF	59,554	42.29	5,018
45	Tirur	C. Mammootty	IUML	UDF	73,432	46.85	Gafoor P. Lillis	NSC	LDF	66,371	42.34	7,061
46	Kottakkal	Abid Hussain Thangal	IUML	UDF	71,768	48.34	N. A. Mohammed Kutty	NCP	LDF	56,726	38.21	15,042
47	Thavanur	K. T. Jaleel	IND	LDF	68,179	47.97	Ifthiquarudeen Master	INC	UDF	51,115	35.96	17,064
48	Ponnani	P. Sreeramakrishnan	CPI(M)	LDF	69,332	48.91	P. T. Ajay Mohan	INC	UDF	53,692	37.87	15,540
Palakkad district
49	Thrithala	V. T. Balram	INC	UDF	66,505	47.16	Subaida Ishac	CPI(M)	LDF	55,958	39.68	10,547
50	Pattambi	Muhammad Muhassin	CPI	LDF	64,025	45.69	C. P. Mohammed	INC	UDF	56,621	40.41	7,404
51	Shornur	P. K. Sasi	CPI(M)	LDF	66,165	46.71	C. Sangeetha	INC	UDF	41,618	29.38	25,447
52	Ottapalam	P. Unni	CPI(M)	LDF	67,161	44.71	Shanimol Usman	INC	UDF	51,073	34.00	16,088
53	Kongad (SC)	K. V. Vijayadas	CPI(M)	LDF	60,790	45.35	Pandalam Sudhakaran	INC	UDF	47,519	35.45	13,271
54	Mannarkkad	N. Samsudheen	IUML	UDF	73,163	49.27	K. P. Suresh Raj	CPI	LDF	60,838	40.97	12,325
55	Malampuzha	V. S. Achuthanandan	CPI(M)	LDF	73,299	45.90	C. Krishnakumar	BJP	NDA	46,157	28.90	27,142
56	Palakkad	Shafi Parambil	INC	UDF	57,559	41.77	Sobha Surendran	BJP	NDA	40,076	29.08	17,383
57	Tarur (SC)	A. K. Balan	CPI(M)	LDF	67,047	52.25	C. Prakash	KC(J)	UDF	43,979	34.28	23,068
58	Chittur	K. Krishnankutty	JD(S)	LDF	69,270	44.90	K. Achuthan	INC	UDF	61,985	40.18	7,285
59	Nenmara	K. Babu	CPI(M)	LDF	66,316	42.90	A. V. Gopinathan	INC	UDF	58,908	38.11	8,108
60	Alathur	K. D. Prasenan	CPI(M)	LDF	71,206	55.35	K. Kusala Kumar	KC(M)	UDF	35,146	27.32	36,060
Thrissur district
61	Chelakkara (SC)	U. R. Pradeep	CPI(M)	LDF	67,771	44.81	Thulasi	INC	UDF	57,571	38.07	10,200
62	Kunnamkulam	A. C. Moideen	CPI(M)	LDF	63,274	41.92	C. P. John	CMPKSC	UDF	55,492	36.77	7,782
63	Guruvayur	K. V. Abdul Khader	CPI(M)	LDF	66,088	44.76	P. M. Sadiqali	IUML	UDF	50,990	40.75	15,098
64	Manalur	Murali Perunelly	CPI(M)	LDF	70,422	43.30	O. Abdu Rahimankutty	INC	UDF	51,097	31.42	19,325
65	Wadakkanchery	Anil Akkara	INC	UDF	65,535	41.02	Mary Thomas	CPI(M)	LDF	65,492	40.99	43
66	Ollur	K. Rajan	CPI(M)	LDF	71,666	47.55	M. P. Vincent	INC	UDF	58,418	38.76	13,248
67	Thrissur	V. S. Sunil Kumar	CPI	LDF	53,664	42.19	Padmaja Venugopal	INC	UDF	46,677	36.70	6,987
68	Nattika (SC)	Geetha Gopi	CPI	LDF	70,218	46.65	K. V. Dasan	INC	UDF	43,441	28.86	26,777
69	Kaipamangalam	E. T. Taison Master	CPI	LDF	66,824	49.60	M. T. Muhammad Nahas	RSP	UDF	33,384	24.78	33,440
70	Irinjalakuda	K. U. Arunan	CPI(M)	LDF	59,730	40.00	Thomas Unniyadan	KC(M)	UDF	57,019	42.33	2,711
71	Puthukkad	C. Raveendranath	CPI(M)	LDF	79,464	50.07	Sundaran Kunnathully	INC	UDF	40,986	25.82	38,478
72	Chalakudy	B. D. Devassy	CPI(M)	LDF	74,251	49.37	T. U. Radhakrishnan	INC	UDF	47,603	31.65	26,648
73	Kodungallur	V. R. Sunil Kumar	CPI	LDF	67,909	45.71	K. P. Dhanapalan	INC	UDF	45,118	30.37	22,791
Ernakulam district
74	Perumbavoor	Eldhose Kunnappilly	INC	UDF	64,285	44.11	Mammikutty P.	CPI(M)	LDF	57,197	39.25	7,288
75	Angamaly	Roji M. John	INC	UDF	66,666	48.96	Benny Moonjely	JD(S)	LDF	57,480	42.22	9,186
76	Aluva	Anwar Sadath	INC	UDF	69,568	47.39	V. Saleem	CPI(M)	LDF	50,733	34.56	18,835
77	Kalamassery	V. K. Ebrahim Kunju	IUML	UDF	68,726	44.37	A. M. Yousaf	CPI(M)	LDF	56,608	36.55	12,118
78	Paravur	V. D. Satheesan	INC	UDF	74,985	46.70	Sarada Mohan	CPI	LDF	54,351	33.85	20,634
79	Vypen	S. Sharma	CPI(M)	LDF	68,526	52.24	K. R. Subhash	INC	UDF	49,173	37.49	19,353
80	Kochi	K. J. Maxi	CPI(M)	LDF	47,967	38.70	Dominic Presentation	INC	UDF	46,881	37.82	1,086
81	Thrippunithura	M. Swaraj	CPI(M)	LDF	62,697	40.53	K. Babu	INC	UDF	58,230	37.64	4,467
82	Ernakulam	Hibi Eden	INC	UDF	57,819	52.32	M. Anil Kumar	CPI(M)	LDF	35,870	32.46	21,949
83	Thrikkakara	P. T. Thomas	INC	UDF	61,451	45.42	Sebastian Paul	CPI(M)	LDF	49,455	36.87	11,996
84	Kunnathunad (SC)	V. P. Sajeendran	INC	UDF	65,445	44.13	Shiji Shivaji	CPI(M)	LDF	62,766	42.32	2,679
85	Piravom	Anoop Jacob	KC(J)	UDF	73,770	45.77	M. J. Jacob	CPI(M)	LDF	67,575	41.93	6,195
86	Muvattupuzha	Eldho Abraham	CPI	LDF	70,269	49.27	Joseph Vazhackkan	INC	UDF	60,894	42.70	9,375
87	Kothamangalam	Antony John	CPI(M)	LDF	65,467	49.26	T. U. Kuruvilla	KC(M)	UDF	46,185	37.88	19,282
Idukki district
88	Devikulam (SC)	S. Rajendran	CPI(M)	LDF	49,510	42.18	A. K. Moni	INC	UDF	43,728	37.25	5,782
89	Udumbanchola	M. M. Mani	CPI(M)	LDF	50,813	40.32	Senapathy Venu	INC	UDF	49,704	39.44	1,109
90	Thodupuzha	P. J. Joseph	KC(M)	UDF	76,564	54.08	Roy Varicattu	IND	LDF	30,977	21.88	46,587
91	Idukki	Roshy Augustine	KC(M)	UDF	60,556	42.86	K. Francis George	IND	LDF	51,223	36.26	9,333
92	Peerumade	E. S. Bijimol	CPI	LDF	56,584	43.94	Syriac Thomas	INC	UDF	56,270	43.70	314
Kottayam district
93	Pala	K. M. Mani	KC(M)	UDF	56,884	42.13	Mani C. Kappan	NCP	LDF	54,181	38.76	2,603
94	Kaduthurthy	Mons Joseph	KC(M)	UDF	73,393	58.03	Skaria Thomas	KC(ST)	LDF	31,537	24.80	42,256
95	Vaikom (SC)	C. K. Asha	CPI	LDF	61,997	46.95	N.K. Neelakandan Master	BDJS	NDA	32,087	28.33	24,584
96	Ettumanoor	K. Suresh Kurup	CPI(M)	LDF	53,805	40.67	Thomas Chazhikadan	KC(M)	UDF	44,906	33.94	8,899
97	Kottayam	Thiruvanchoor Radhakrishnan	INC	UDF	73,894	57.46	Reji Sakhariya	CPI(M)	LDF	40,262	31.31	33,632
98	Puthuppally	Oommen Chandy	INC	UDF	71,597	53.42	Jaick C. Thomas	CPI(M)	LDF	44,505	33.20	27,092
99	Changanassery	C. F. Thomas	KC(M)	UDF	50,371	40.04	K. C. Joseph	IND	LDF	48,522	38.57	1,849
100	Kanjirappally	N. Jayaraj	KC(M)	UDF	53,126	38.86	V. B. Binu	CPI(M)	LDF	49,236	36.02	3,890
101	Poonjar	P. C. George	IND	N/A	63,621	43.65	Georgekutty Augusty	KC(M)	UDF	35,800	24.56	27,821
Alappuzha district
102	Aroor	A. M. Ariff	CPI(M)	LDF	84,720	52.34	C. R. Jayaprakash	INC	UDF	46,201	28.54	38,519
103	Cherthala	P. Thilothaman	CPI	LDF	81,197	45.70	S. Sarath	INC	UDF	74,001	41.65	7,196
104	Alappuzha	T. M. Thomas Issac	CPI(M)	LDF	83,219	53.29	Laly Vincent	INC	UDF	52,719	33.42	31,032
105	Ambalappuzha	G. Sudhakaran	CPI(M)	LDF	63,069	47.32	Shaik P. Harriz	JD(U)	UDF	40,448	33.42	22,621
106	Kuttanad	Thomas Chandy	NCP	LDF	50,114	38.52	Jacob Abraham	KC(M)	UDF	45,223	34.76	4,891
107	Haripad	Ramesh Chennithala	INC	UDF	75,980	51.05	P. Prasad	CPI	LDF	57,359	38.54	18,621
108	Kayamkulam	U. Prathibha Hari	CPI(M)	LDF	72,956	46.53	M. Liju	INC	UDF	61,099	38.96	11,757
109	Mavelikara (SC)	R. Rajesh	CPI(M)	LDF	74,455	49.81	Baiju Kalasala	INC	UDF	43,013	28.74	31,542
110	Chengannur	K. K. Ramachandran Nair	CPI(M)	LDF	52,880	36.34	P. C. Vishnunath	INC	UDF	44,897	30.85	7,983
Pathanamthitta district
111	Thiruvalla	Mathew T. Thomas	JD(S)	LDF	59,660	41.28	Joseph M. Puthussery	KC(M)	UDF	51,398	35.56	8,462
112	Ranni	Raju Abrham	CPI(M)	LDF	58,749	43.87	Mariamma Cherian	INC	UDF	44,153	32.97	14,596
113	Aranmula	Veena George	CPI(M)	LDF	64,523	39.97	K. Sivadasan Nair	INC	UDF	56,877	35.23	7,646
114	Konni	Adoor Prakash	INC	UDF	72,800	50.81	R. Sanal Kumar	CPI(M)	LDF	52,052	36.33	20,748
115	Adoor (SC)	Chittayam Gopakumar	CPI	LDF	76,034	49.05	K. K. Shaju	INC	UDF	50,574	32.62	25,460
Kollam district
116	Karunagappally	R. Ramachandran	CPI	LDF	69,902	43.06	C. R. Mahesh	INC	UDF	68,143	41.97	1,759
117	Chavara	N. Vijayan Pillai	CMP(A)	LDF	64,666	46.80	Shibu Baby John	RSP	UDF	58,477	42.32	8,189
118	Kunnathur (SC)	Kovoor Kunjumon	IND	LDF	75,725	47.38	Ullas Kovur	RSP	UDF	55,196	34.54	20,529
119	Kottarakkara	P. Aisha Potty	CPI(M)	LDF	83,443	55.44	Savin Sathyan	INC	UDF	40,811	27.11	42,632
120	Pathanapuram	K. B. Ganesh Kumar	KC(B)	LDF	74,429	52.39	P. V. Jagadish Kumar	INC	UDF	49,867	35.10	24,562
121	Punalur	K. Raju	CPI	LDF	82,136	56.85	A. Younus Kunju	IUML	UDF	48,554	33.61	33,582
122	Chadayamangalam	Mullakkara Ratnakaran	CPI	LDF	71,262	49.10	M. M. Hassan	INC	UDF	49,334	33.99	21,928
123	Kundara	J. Mercy Kutty Amma	CPI(M)	LDF	79,047	51.81	Rajmohan Unnithan	INC	UDF	48,587	31.85	30,460
124	Kollam	M. Mukesh	CPI(M)	LDF	63,103	48.81	Sooraj Ravi	INC	UDF	45,492	35.19	17,611
125	Eravipuram	M. Noushad	CPI(M)	LDF	65,392	52.33	A. A. Azeez	RSP	UDF	36,589	29.28	28,803
126	Chathanoor	G. S. Jayalal	CPI	LDF	67,606	50.76	B. B. Gopakumar	BJP	NDA	33,199	24.92	34,407
Thiruvananthapuram district
127	Varkala	V. Joy	CPI(M)	LDF	53,102	41.43	Varkala Kahar	INC	UDF	50,716	39.57	2,386
128	Attingal (SC)	B. Satyan	CPI(M)	LDF	72,808	52.71	K. Chandrababu	RSP	UDF	32,425	23.47	40,383
129	Chirayinkeezhu (SC)	V. Sasi	CPI	LDF	64,692	46.75	K. S. Ajith Kumar	INC	UDF	50,370	36.40	14,322
130	Nedumangad	C. Divakaran	CPI	LDF	57,745	38.16	Palode Ravi	INC	UDF	54,124	35.76	3,621
131	Vamanapuram	D. K. Murali	CPI(M)	LDF	65,848	46.56	T. Sarathchandra Prasad	INC	UDF	56,252	39.77	9,596
132	Kazhakootam	Kadakampally Surendran	CPI(M)	LDF	50,079	37.38	V. Muraleedharan	BJP	NDA	42,732	31.90	7,347
133	Vattiyoorkavu	K. Muraleedharan	INC	UDF	51,322	37.43	Kummanam Rajasekharan	BJP	NDA	43,700	31.87	7,522
134	Thiruvananthapuram	V. S. Sivakumar	INC	UDF	46,474	36.82	Antony Raju	IND	LDF	35,569	28.18	10,905
135	Nemom	O. Rajagopal	BJP	NDA	67,813	47.46	V. Sivankutty	CPI(M)	LDF	59,142	41.39	8,613
136	Aruvikkara	K. S. Sabarinathan	INC	UDF	70,910	49.32	A. A. Rasheed	CPI(M)	LDF	49,596	34.50	21,314
137	Parassala	C. K. Hareendran	CPI(M)	LDF	70,156	44.41	A. T. George	INC	UDF	51,590	32.66	18,566
138	Kattakada	I. B. Satheesh	CPI(M)	LDF	51,614	35.93	N. Sakthan	INC	UDF	50,765	35.34	849
139	Kovalam	M. Vincent	INC	UDF	60,268	47.60	Jameela Prakasam	JD(S)	LDF	57,653	37.45	3,415
140	Neyyatinkara	K. Ansalan	CPI(M)	LDF	63,559	47.20	R. Selvaraj	INC	UDF	54,016	40.12	9,543

Notable performances of other candidates

01.P.C.George won from Poonjar Constituency with a margion 27821 votes

== By-elections ==
- 2019 Kerala Legislative Assembly by-elections

Year	Constituency	District	UDF candidate	Party	Votes	LDF candidate	Party	Votes	NDA candidate	Party	Votes	Winner	Margin	Previous Winning Alliance	Winning Alliance	Winning party
2017	Vengara	Malappuram	K.N.A. Khader	IUML	65227	P.P.Basheer	CPI(M)	41917	K Janachandran	BJP	5728	K.N.A. Khader	24123	UDF	UDF	IUML
2018	Chengannur	Alappuzha	D.Vijayakumar	INC	46347	Saji Cherian	CPI(M)	67303	P. S. Sreedharan Pillai	BJP	35270	Saji Cherian	20956	LDF	LDF	CPI(M)
2019	Manjeshwaram	Kasaragod	M. C. Kamaruddin	IUML	65407	M Shankara Rai	CPI(M)	38233	Ravisha Thanthri Kuntar	BJP	57484	M. C. Kamaruddin	7923	UDF	UDF	IUML
2019	Pala	Kottayam	Jose Tom Pulikunnel	UDF Independent	51194	Mani C. Kappan	NCP	54137	N.Hari	BJP	18044	Mani C. Kappan	2943	UDF	LDF	NCP
2019	Vattiyoorkavu	Thiruvananthapuram	K. Mohan Kumar	INC	40365	V. K. Prasanth	CPI(M)	54830	Adv S Suresh	BJP	27453	V. K. Prasanth	14465	UDF	LDF	CPI(M)
2019	Konni	Pathanamthitta	P Mohanraj	INC	44146	K. U. Jenish Kumar	CPI(M)	54099	K. Surendran	BJP	39786	K. U. Jenish Kumar	9953	UDF	LDF	CPI(M)
2019	Aroor	Alappuzha	Shanimol Usman	INC	69356	Manu C. Pulikkal	CPI(M)	67277	K.P.Prakash Babu	BJP	16289	Shanimol Usman	2079	LDF	UDF	INC
2019	Ernakulam	Ernakulam	T. J. Vinod	INC	37891	Adv. Manu Roy	LDF Independent	34141	C.G.Rajagopal	BJP	13351	T. J. Vinod	3750	UDF	UDF	INC

No by-election is conducted for Kuttanad and Chavara

Assembly seat sharing post – bye election results:

UDF	LDF	NDA	Vacant Seats
45	91	1	2

== See also ==
- 2015 Kerala local body elections
- 2020 Kerala local body elections
- GoBackModi
