= Karunagappally Assembly constituency =

Constituency of the Kerala legislative assembly in India

Karunagappally
- Constituency No. 116 for the Kerala Legislative Assembly
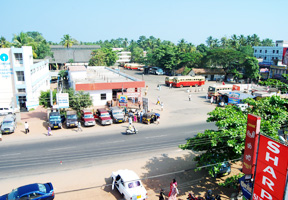
- Karunagappally town in Karunagappally Assembly constituency

Constituency details
- Country: India
- Region: South India
- State: Kerala
- District: Kollam
- Lok Sabha constituency: Alappuzha
- Established: 1957
- Total electors: 2,13,993 (2021)
- Reservation: None

Member of Legislative Assembly
- 16th Kerala Legislative Assembly
- Incumbent C. R. Mahesh
- Party: INC
- Alliance: UDF
- Elected year: 2026

Karunagappally State assembly constituency is one of the 140 state legislative assembly constituencies in Kerala in southern India. It is also one of the seven state legislative assembly constituencies included in Alappuzha Lok Sabha constituency. As of the 2026 assembly elections, the current MLA is C. R. Mahesh of Indian National Congress.

== Structure ==
Karunagappally Assembly constituency was formed in 1951. As per the recent changes on Assembly constituency delimitations, the Assembly constituency consists of Karunagappally municipality and six panchayaths from Karunagappally taluk including Alappad, Clappana, Kulasekharapuram, Oachira, Thazhava and Thodiyoor.

== Major institutions in the constituency ==
- Municipality: 1 (Karunagappally)
- Panchayaths: 6 (Alappad, Clappana, Kulasekharapuram, Oachira, Thazhava and Thodiyoor)
- Railway stations: 2 (Karunagappalli, Oachira)
- Government hospitals: 4 (Chest Disease Hospital (TB) in Karunagappally, Govt. Taluk Hospital in Karunagappally, Community Health Center in Mynagapally, Community Health Center in Oachira)

== Members of the Legislative Assembly ==
The following list contains all members of Kerala Legislative Assembly who have represented the constituency:

Election	Niyama Sabha	Name	Party	Tenure
1957	1st	P. Kunjukrishnan	Indian National Congress	1957 – 1960
1960	2nd	Baby John	Independent	1960 – 1965
1967	3rd	Baby John	Independent	1967 – 1970
1970	4th	Baby John	Revolutionary Socialist Party	1970 – 1977
1977	5th	B. M. Sheriff	Communist Party of India	1977 – 1980
1980	6th	B. M. Sheriff	Communist Party of India	1980 – 1982
1982	7th	T. V. Vijayarajan	Independent	1982 – 1987
1987	8th	P. S. Sreenivasan	Communist Party of India	1987 – 1991
1991	9th	P. S. Sreenivasan	Communist Party of India	1991 – 1996
1996	10th	E. Chandrasekharan Nair	Communist Party of India	1996 – 2001
2001	11th	A. N. Rajan Babu	Janathipathiya Samrakshana Samithy	2001 – 2006
2006	12th	C. Divakaran	Communist Party of India	2006 – 2011
2011	13th	C. Divakaran	Communist Party of India	2011 – 2016
2016	14th	R. Ramachandran	Communist Party of India	2016 - 2021
2021	15th	C. R. Mahesh	Indian National Congress	2021-2026
2026	16th	C. R. Mahesh	Indian National Congress	Incumbent

== Election results ==
Percentage change (±%) denotes the change in the number of votes from the immediate previous election.

=== 2026 ===
There were 2,15,785 registered electors in Karunagappally assembly constituency in the 2026 legislative assembly election.

2026 Kerala Legislative Assembly election: Karunagappally
Party	Candidate	Votes	%	±%
INC	C. R. Mahesh	82,593	47.81	▼6.57
CPI	M. S. Thara	55,975	32.40	▼5.12
BJP	V. S. Jithindev	32,121	18.59	▲11.58
SDPI	Latheef	1,227	0.71	−
NOTA	None of the above	525	0.30	▲0.04
SUCI(C)	Twinkle Prabhakaran	295	0.17	−
Margin of victory		26,618	15.40	▼1.28
Turnout		1,72,736	80.05	▼0.92
INC hold		Swing	-	

=== 2021 ===
There were 2,13,993 registered voters in the constituency for the 2021 Kerala Assembly election.

2021 Kerala Legislative Assembly election: Karunagappally
Party	Candidate	Votes	%	±%
INC	C. R. Mahesh	94,225	54.38	▲12.41
CPI	R. Ramachandran	65,017	37.52	▼5.54
BJP	Bitty Sudheer	12,144	7.01	
NOTA	None of the above	450	0.26	
Margin of victory		29,208	16.68	▲15.59
Turnout		1,73,284	80.97	▲1.60
INC gain from CPI		Swing		

=== 2016 ===
There were 2,04,539 registered voters in the constituency for the 2016 Kerala Assembly election.

2016 Kerala Legislative Assembly election: Karunagappally
Party	Candidate	Votes	%	±%
CPI	R. Ramachandran	69,902	43.06	▼7.07
INC	C. R. Mahesh	68,143	41.97	▲2.38
BDJS	V. Sadasivan	19,115	11.77	
SDPI	A. K. Salahudeen	1,737	1.07	▼4.48
PDP	Mylakkadu Shah	1,620	1.00	−
BSP	Gopalakrishnan	649	0.40	
Independent	Ramachandran	594	0.37	
NOTA	None of the above	590	0.36	
Margin of victory		1,759	1.09	▼9.45
Turnout		1,62,351	79.37	▲3.86
CPI hold		Swing	▼7.07	

=== 2011 ===
There were 1,82,508 registered voters in the constituency for the 2011 election.

2011 Kerala Legislative Assembly election: Karunagappally
Party	Candidate	Votes	%	±%
CPI	C. Divakaran	69,086	50.13	
JSS	A. N. Rajan Babu	54,564	39.59	
SDPI	Nazarudeen Elamaram	7,645	5.55	
BJP	Malumel Sumesh	5,097	3.70	
Independent	P. D. Sudheer	868	0.63	−
SUCI(C)	Twinkle Prabhakaran	547	0.40	
Margin of victory		14,522	10.54	
Turnout		1,37,807	75.51	
CPI hold		Swing		

=== 2006 ===
There were 1,39,839 registered voters in the constituency for the 2006 Kerala Assembly election.

2006 Kerala Legislative Assembly election: Karunagappally
Party	Candidate	Votes	%	±%
CPI	C. Divakaran	53,287	52.1	
JSS	A. N. Rajan Babu	40,791	39.9	
Independent	N. Parameswaran Potty	3,653	3.6	
BJP	Anil Vazhappally	2,836	2.8	
BSP	Adv. S. Prahladan	840	0.8	
Independent	T. H. Muhammed Kunju	479	0.5	
Independent	N. Gopinathan	351	0.3	
Margin of victory		12,496	12.2	
Turnout		1,02,259	73.1	
CPI gain from JSS		Swing		

=== 2001 ===
There were 1,46,933 registered voters in the constituency for the 2001 Kerala Assembly election.

2001 Kerala Legislative Assembly election: Karunagappally
Party	Candidate	Votes	%	±%
JSS	A. N. Rajan Babu	53,206	48.5	
CPI	K. C. Pillai	52,367	47.7	
BJP	T. Kalesan	2,913	2.7	
Independent	A. A. Azeez	1,197	1.1	
Margin of victory		839	0.8	
Turnout		1,09,709	74.7	
JSS gain from CPI		Swing		
