= Vamanapuram Assembly constituency =

Constituency of the Kerala legislative assembly in India

Vamanapuram
- Constituency No. 131 for the Kerala Legislative Assembly

Constituency details
- Country: India
- Region: South India
- State: Kerala
- District: Thiruvananthapuram
- Lok Sabha constituency: Attingal
- Established: 1957
- Total electors: 1,99,992 (2021)
- Reservation: None

Member of Legislative Assembly
- 16th Kerala Legislative Assembly
- Incumbent Sudheersha Palode
- Party: INC
- Elected year: 2026

Vamanapuram is one of the 140 state legislative assembly constituencies in Kerala in southern India. It is also one of the seven state legislative assembly constituencies included in Attingal Lok Sabha constituency. As of the 2026 Assembly elections, the current MLA is Muhammed Sudheersha of INC.

== Local self-governed segments ==
Vamanapuram Assembly constituency is composed of the following local self-governed segments:

Sl no.	Name	Status (Grama panchayat/Municipality)	Taluk
1	Anad	Grama panchayat	Nedumangad
2	Kallara	Grama panchayat	Nedumangad
3	Nanniyode	Grama panchayat	Nedumangad
4	Nellanad	Grama panchayat	Nedumangad
5	Panavoor	Grama panchayat	Nedumangad
6	Pangode	Grama panchayat	Nedumangad
7	Peringamala	Grama panchayat	Nedumangad
8	Pullampara	Grama panchayat	Nedumangad
9	Vamanapuram	Grama panchayat	Nedumangad

== Members of Legislative Assembly ==
The following list contains all members of the Kerala Legislative Assembly who have represented the constituency:

Election	Member	Party
1967	N. V. Pillai	Communist Party of India (Marxist)
1970	M. Kunjukrishna Pillai	Indian National Congress
1977	N. Vasudevan Pillai	Communist Party of India (Marxist)
1980	Koliakode N. Krishnan Nair	Communist Party of India (Marxist)
1982	Koliakode N. Krishnan Nair	Communist Party of India (Marxist)
1987	Koliakode N. Krishnan Nair	Communist Party of India (Marxist)
1991	Koliakode N. Krishnan Nair	Communist Party of India (Marxist)
1996	Pirappancode Murali	Communist Party of India (Marxist)
2001	Pirappancode Murali	Communist Party of India (Marxist)
2006	J. Arundathi	Communist Party of India (Marxist)
2011	Koliakode N. Krishnan Nair	Communist Party of India (Marxist)
2016	D. K. Murali	Communist Party of India (Marxist)
2021	D. K. Murali	Communist Party of India (Marxist)
2026	Sudheersha Palode	Indian National Congress

== Election results ==
Percentage change (±%) denotes the change in the number of votes from the immediate previous election.

=== 2026 ===
}} }}

2026 Kerala Legislative Assembly election: Vamanapuram
Party	Candidate	Votes	%	±%
INC	Sudheersha Palode	73,590	49.36	▲9.59
CPI(M)	D. K. Murali	61,405	41.19	▼8.37
BDJS	Venu	12,091	8.11	
BSP	Vipinlal V A	734	0.49	
Anna DHRM	Ratheesh R	275	0.18	
Independent	Mulareedharan Nair G	173	0.12	new
NOTA	None of the above	812	0.54	
Margin of victory		12,185		
Turnout		1,49082		
INC gain from CPI(M)		Swing		

=== 2016 ===
There were 1,97,254 registered voters in the constituency for the 2016 Kerala Assembly election.

2016 Kerala Legislative Assembly election: Vamanapuram
Party	Candidate	Votes	%	±%
CPI(M)	D. K. Murali	65,848	46.56	▲0.05
INC	T. Sarathchandra Prasad	56,252	39.77	▼4.93
BDJS	R. V. Nikhil	13,956	9.87	
SDPI	Thachonam Nisamudeen	1,774	1.25	▼0.55
BSP	Anil Paalode	901	0.64	▼0.06
NOTA	None of the above	789	0.56	
Independent	Sugathan S.	517	0.37	
SS	G. Ajith	515	0.36	
Independent	Irincham Suresh	286	0.20	▼0.15
API	Anil K. Pongadu	228	0.16	
Independent	Maniraj Bharathannoor	123	0.09	
Margin of victory		9,596	6.79	▲4.98
Turnout		1,41,435	71.70	▲0.96
CPI(M) hold		Swing	▲0.05	

=== 2011 ===
There were 1,74,408 registered voters in the constituency for the 2011 election.

2011 Kerala Legislative Assembly election: Vamanapuram
Party	Candidate	Votes	%	±%
CPI(M)	Koliakode N. Krishnan Nair	57,381	46.51	
INC	C. Mohanachandran	55,145	44.70	
BJP	Karette Sivaprasad	5,228	4.24	
SDPI	Pirappankode Shahjahan	2,225	1.80	
Independent	Seleena Prakkanam	1,613	1.31	
BSP	Sasi R. Cheraman	667	0.70	
Independent	Irinchayam Suresh	437	0.35	
Independent	Krishnan Nair	275	0.22	
Independent	Bharathannoor Balan	205	0.17	
Margin of victory		2,236	1.81	
Turnout		1,23,376	70.74	
CPI(M) hold		Swing		

=== 2006 ===
2006 Kerala Legislative Assembly election: Vamanapuram
Party	Candidate	Votes	%	±%
CPI(M)	J. Arundhathi	45,743	47.25	
JSS	S. Shine	39,234	40.53	
Independent	S Anilkumar	5,627	5.81	
Margin of victory		6,509	6.72	
Turnout		96,797		
CPI(M) hold		Swing		

=== 2001 ===
There were 1,60,262 registered voters in the constituency for the 2001 election.

2001 Kerala Legislative Assembly election: Vamanapuram
Party	Candidate	Votes	%	±%
CPI(M)	Pirappancode Murali	52,749	48.10	
JSS	S. Shine	51,140	46.63	
BJP	V. Rajendran Nair	4,134	3.77	
Margin of victory		1,609	1.47	
Turnout		1,09,674	68.45	
CPI(M) hold		Swing		

=== 1996 ===
There were 1,50,522 registered voters in the constituency for the 1996 election.

1996 Kerala Legislative Assembly election: Vamanapuram
Party	Candidate	Votes	%	±%
CPI(M)	Pirappancode Murali	48,491	48.04	
JSS	C. K. Sitaram	42,105	41.71	
PDP	A. Ansari	5,758	5.70	
Margin of victory		6,386	6.33	
Turnout		1,00,944	69.03	
CPI(M) hold		Swing		

=== 1991 ===
There were 1,47,842 registered voters in the constituency for the 1991 election.

1991 Kerala Legislative Assembly election: Vamanapuram
Party	Candidate	Votes	%	±%
CPI(M)	Koliakode N. Krishnan Nair	52,248	49.16	
INC	R. M. Parameswaran	50,882	47.88	
BJP	N Chakrapani	2,409	3.77	
Margin of victory		1,366	1.28	
Turnout		1,06,272	72.72	
CPI(M) hold		Swing		

=== 1987 ===
There were 1,20,576 registered voters in the constituency for the 1987 election.

1987 Kerala Legislative Assembly election: Vamanapuram
Party	Candidate	Votes	%	±%
CPI(M)	Koliakode N. Krishnan Nair	52,410	54.45	
INC	N. Peethambara Kurup	42,294	43.94	
BJP	N Chakrapani	639	0.66	
Margin of victory		10,116	10.51	
Turnout		96,251	80.35	
CPI(M) hold		Swing		

=== 1982 ===
There were 99,227 registered voters in the constituency for the 1982 election.

1982 Kerala Legislative Assembly election: Vamanapuram
Party	Candidate	Votes	%	±%
CPI(M)	Koliakode N. Krishnan Nair	36,303	51.38	
Independent	R. M. Parameswaran	34,349	48.62	
Margin of victory		1,954	2.76	
Turnout		70,652	71.84	
CPI(M) hold		Swing		

=== 1980 ===
There were 92,744 registered voters in the constituency for the 1980 election.

1980 Kerala Legislative Assembly election: Vamanapuram
Party	Candidate	Votes	%	±%
CPI(M)	Koliakode N. Krishnan Nair	38,333	57.19	
INC	A. Nafeesath Beevi	26,273	39.19	
Margin of victory		12,060	18.0	
Turnout		67,044	72.63	
CPI(M) hold		Swing		

=== 1977 ===
There were 80,172 registered voters in the constituency for the 1977 election.

1977 Kerala Legislative Assembly election: Vamanapuram
Party	Candidate	Votes	%	±%
CPI(M)	N. Vasudevan Pillai	31,463	51.34	
INC	M. Kunjukrishna Pillai	29,071	47.43	
Margin of victory		2,392	3.91	
Turnout		61,287	78.01	
CPI(M) gain from INC		Swing		

=== 1970 ===
There were 64,219 registered voters in the constituency for the 1970 election.

1970 Kerala Legislative Assembly election: Vamanapuram
Party	Candidate	Votes	%	±%
INC	M Kunjukrishna Pillai	23,122	52.04	
CPI(M)	N. Vasudevan Pillai	21,305	47.96	
Margin of victory		1,817	4.08	
Turnout		44,427	70.11	
INC gain from CPI(M)		Swing		

== See also ==
- Vamanapuram
- Thiruvananthapuram district
- List of constituencies of the Kerala Legislative Assembly
- 2016 Kerala Legislative Assembly election
