= Varavila =

Village in Kollam District, Kerala, India

Varavila is a small place located near Oachira in Kollam district, Kerala, India. Clappana village is in Varavila. Mainly Varavila is the Post Office in Clappana. It has been described as "very beautiful place in our God's Own Country". It has been claimed that the climate makes "Clappana feel like heaven".

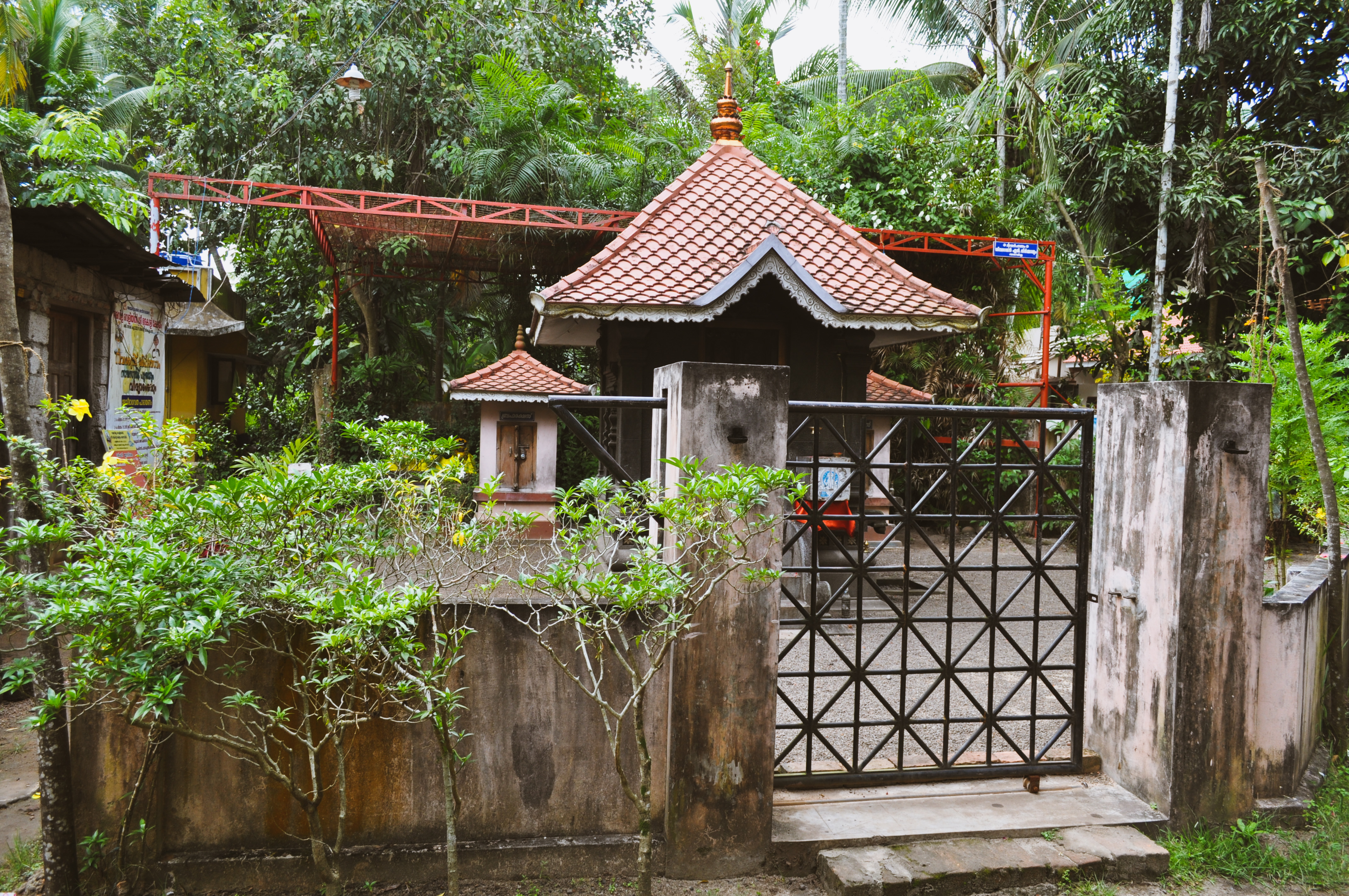
Veliyil Shri Bhadrakali Temple.
