= P. S. Sreenivasan =

Indian politician

Minister For Revenue and Tourism, Government of Kerala
- In office March 26 1987 – June 17 1991
- Preceded by: P. J. Joseph (Minister for Revenue)
- Succeeded by: K. M. Mani (Minister for Revenue)

Minister For Revenue and Fisheries, Government of Kerala
- In office January 25 1980 – October 20 1981
- Preceded by: K. J. Chacko (Minister For Revenue), C. H. Muhammed Koya (Minister For Fisheries)
- Succeeded by: P. J. Joseph (Minister For Revenue)

Minister For Industries, Government of Kerala
- In office 29 October 1978 – October 7 1979
- Preceded by: P. K. Vasudevan Nair
- Succeeded by: K. A. Mathew

Minister For Forest, Government of Kerala
- In office November 18 1978 – October 7 1979
- Preceded by: Kanthalott Kunhambu
- Succeeded by: K. A. Mathew

Minister For Electricity and Transport, Government of Kerala
- In office October 4 1970 – September 24 1971
- Preceded by: K. M. George (Minister For Transport), M. N. Govindan Nair (Minister For Electricity )
- Succeeded by: M. N. Govindan Nair (Minister For Electricity and Transport)

Member of Kerala Legislative Assembly
- In office March 25 1987 – May 14 1996
- Preceded by: T. V. Vijayarajan
- Succeeded by: E. Chandrashekaran Nair
- Constituency: Karunagappalli
- In office January 25 1980 – March 17 1982
- Preceded by: M. K. Raghavan
- Succeeded by: Vayalar Ravi
- Constituency: Cherthala
- In office March 22 1977 – November 30 1979
- Preceded by: K. R. Gowri Amma
- Succeeded by: K. R. Gowri Amma
- Constituency: Aroor
- In office February 9 1960 – March 22 1964
- Preceded by: K. R. Narayanan
- Succeeded by: M. K. Keshavan
- Constituency: Vaikom

Personal details
- Born: September , 1923
- Died: July 9, 1997 (aged 73) Thiruvananthapuram
- Party: CPI
- Spouse: Bharathi Amma
- Children: One son
- Parent: K. Krishnan (father)

P. S. Sreenivasan (September 1923 – 8 July 1997) was a leader of the Communist Party of India (CPI) and a former minister of Kerala state, He is known as the father of tourism in modern Kerala.

He was born at Ullala, Vaikom in September 1923, the son of Shri Koppuzha K. Krishnan, a farmer and coir wholesale trader and Chengottu Narayani. He entered politics through student movements and the State Congress, joining the CPI in 1943. During the period of C.P. Ramaswamy Aiyer's government he was imprisoned for 16 months, later followed by a further three years of imprisonment for his leadership role in the Koothattukulam Police Station attack to take hold of weapons. Despite this he played an important role in the growth of CPI in Kerala.

He was elected to Kerala Assembly in 1960, 1967 and 1970 from Vaikom constituency as a CPI candidate. In 1977 he was elected from Aroor, and in 1980 from Cherthalai. Again, he was elected in 1987 and 1991 from Karunagappally constituency.

He was married to Smt. Bharathy and they had one son.

He served as the Minister for Transport, Electricity and Forests, from October 1970 to September 1971, in the Ministry headed by C. Achutha Menon, and as the Minister for Industries and Forests, from November 1978 to October 1979, in the Ministry headed by P. K. Vasudevan Nair. From January 1980 to October 1981 he was the Minister for Revenue and Fisheries; and from March 1987 to June 1991, he was the Minister for Revenue and Tourism, in the Ministries headed by E.K. Nayanar.

Besides being a member of the Kerala State Council Executive for the CPI, for which he served as treasurer, he was also Leader of the CPI Parliamentary Party and National council member.

He served as president of several community bodies, including the Kerala Karshaka Thozhilali Federation, Kerala Coir Thozhilali Federation, Kerala Hospital Employees Association and Kerala Transport Employees Union. He also served as for two terms as a Senate member of Kerala University.

P.S. Sreenivasan died on 8 July 1997. The Kerala Assembly paid its homage to him on 14 July 1997.
