= Koliakode N. Krishnan Nair =

Indian politician

Member of the Kerala Legislative Assembly
- In office 2011 – 2016
- Preceded by: J. Arundathi
- Succeeded by: D. K. Murali
- Constituency: Vamanapuram
- In office 1980 – 1996
- Constituency: Vamanapuram
- Preceded by: N. Vasudevan Pillai
- Succeeded by: Pirappancode Murali

Personal details
- Born: 27 March 1938 (age 88) Koliyakode, Kerala, India
- Party: Communist Party of India (Marxist)
- Spouse: B. Tulasi
- Children: Two sons
- Parent(s): Neelakanta Pillai; Lekshmikutty Amma
- Relatives: Lekshmi Nair (niece)

Koliakode Neelakanta Pillai Krishnan Nair is an Indian politician and a lawyer. He represented Vamanapuram constituency in 6th, 7th, 8th, 9th, and 13th Kerala Legislative Assembly.

== Political life ==
Born in Traivandrum diristrict in kerala in a wealthy family, he was drawn to political activities through student-youth movements.He was sectrary of Kerala students federation(Now SFI) during 1964 -1968, He worked with several farmers' organizations. Presently he is the member of the Senate of University of Kerala. He also serves as the member of governing committee of Pariyaram Co-operative Medical College. He was previously elected to Kerala legislature in 1980, 1982, 1987, 1991, and 2011. He was elected to Kerala University Senate. He was a senate member for 16 years. He was also a Syndicate member for 6 years. He served as the President of State Agriculture Co-Operative Bank and State Co-Operative Bank. Now he is the Chairman of the State Co-Operative Union.

In 1995, Koliakode was expelled from CPI(M) as part of disciplinary proceedings, but he rejoined the party as a primary member after the Control Commission allowed his appeal. In his autobiography, Pirappancode Murali accused Koliyakode, who is closely related to the CPM state leadership, of using that influence to avoid him from the candidature in Vamanapuram and when that failed, he tried to defeat him, but Krishnan Nair responded that the allegations leveled against him were false and baseless.

== Family ==
He is the son of Neelakanta Pillai and Lekshmikutty Amma. He has 2 brothers and a sister. He was born on 27 March 1938 at Koliyakode. He is a lawyer by profession. He is married to B Tulasi and has two sons, Unnikrishnan and Radhakrishnan. Lekshmi Nair, a culinary chef from Kerala is his niece.

== See also ==
- Kerala Law Academy
