= Vaikom Assembly constituency =

Constituency of the Kerala legislative assembly in India

Vaikom
- Constituency No. 95 for the Kerala Legislative Assembly
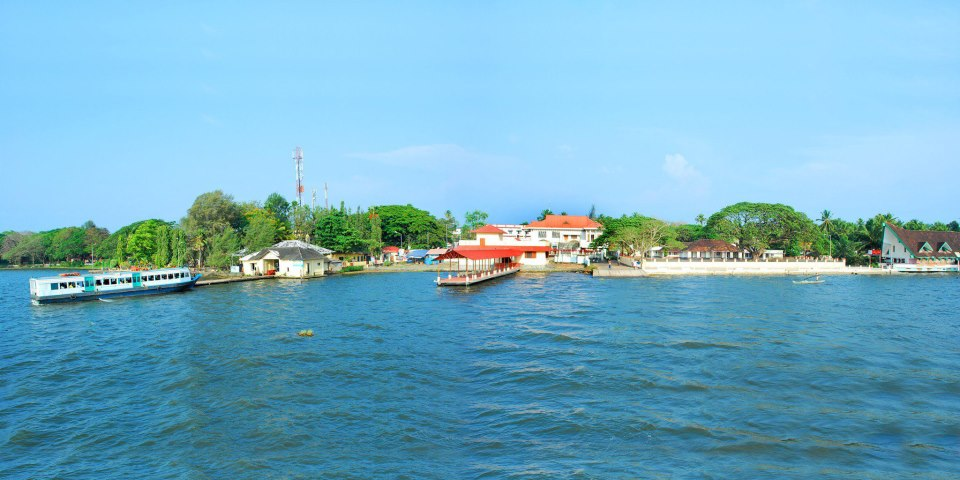
- Vembanad Lake at Vaikom

Constituency details
- Country: India
- Region: South India
- State: Kerala
- District: Kottayam
- Established: 1957
- Total electors: 1.5 lakhs+ (2021)
- Reservation: SC

Member of Legislative Assembly
- 16th Kerala Legislative Assembly
- Incumbent K. Binimon
- Party: INC
- Alliance: UDF
- Elected year: 2026

Vaikom is one of the 140 state legislative assembly constituencies in Kerala in southern India. It is also one of the seven state legislative assembly constituencies included in Kottayam Lok Sabha constituency. As of the 2026 Assembly elections, the current MLA of this constituency is K. Binimon of INC.

== Local self-governed segments ==
Vaikom Assembly constituency is composed of the following local self-governed segments:

Sl no.	Name	Status (Grama panchayat/Municipality)	Taluk
1	Vaikom	Municipality	Vaikom
2	Chempu	Grama panchayat	Vaikom
3	Kallara	Grama panchayat	Vaikom
4	Maravanthuruthu	Grama panchayat	Vaikom
5	T. V. Puram	Grama panchayat	Vaikom
6	Thalayazham	Grama panchayat	Vaikom
7	Thalayolaparambu	Grama panchayat	Vaikom
8	Udayanapuram	Grama panchayat	Vaikom
9	Vechoor	Grama panchayat	Vaikom
10	Velloor	Grama panchayat	Vaikom

== Members of the Legislative Assembly ==
The following list contains all members of Kerala Legislative Assembly who have represented the constituency:

Year	Member	Political party
1957	K. R. Narayanan	Indian National Congress
1960	P. S. Sreenivasan	Communist Party of India
1967	P. S. Sreenivasan	Communist Party of India
1970	P. S. Sreenivasan	Communist Party of India
1977	M. K. Keshavan	Communist Party of India
1980	M. K. Keshavan	Communist Party of India
1982	M. K. Keshavan	Communist Party of India
1987	P. K. Raghavan	Communist Party of India
1991	K. K. Balakrishnan	Indian National Congress
1996	M. K. Keshavan	Communist Party of India
1998 (Note: By-Election)	P. Narayanan	Communist Party of India
2001	P. Narayanan	Communist Party of India
2006	K. Ajith	Communist Party of India
2011	K. Ajith	Communist Party of India
2016	C. K. Asha	Communist Party of India
2021	C. K. Asha	Communist Party of India
2026	K. Binimon	Indian National Congress

== Election results ==
Percentage change (±%) denotes the change in the number of votes from the immediate previous election.

=== 2026 ===
There were 1,56,228 registered voters in the constituency for 2026 Kerala legislative assembly election.

2026 Kerala Legislative Assembly election: Vaikom
Party	Candidate	Votes	%	±%
INC	K. Binimon	52,944	41.94	▲8.81
CPI	P. Pradeep	51,584	40.86	▼15.10
BJP	K. Ajith	20,297	16.08	▲6.71
NOTA	None of the above	737	0.58	▲0.05
BSP	Sumam P. S.	280	0.22	▼0.35
Independent	Adv. P. I. Jayakumar	158	0.13	−
Independent	Pradeep	123	0.10	−
SUCI(C)	T. M. Bose	115	0.09	−
Margin of victory		1,360	1.08	▼21.75
Turnout		1,26,238	80.80	▲3.38
INC gain from CPI		Swing	▼15.10	

=== 2021 ===
In 2021 Kerala Assembly election, Vaikom is the only Women Candidate constituency in Kerala.

2021 Kerala Legislative Assembly election: Vaikom
Party	Candidate	Votes	%	±%
CPI	C. K. Asha	71,388	55.96	▲9.01
INC	P. R. Sona	42,266	33.13	▲5.3
BDJS	Ajitha Sabu	11,953	9.37	▼19.4
BSP	Akhiljith Kallara	726	0.57	▲0.16
NOTA	None of the above	670	0.53	▼0.08
BHUDRP	Bindu	258	0.20	−
Independent	Kuttan Kattachira	163	0.13	−
SUCI(C)	T.K Sabu	152	0.12	−
Margin of victory		29,122	22.83	▲4.21
Turnout		1,27,576	77.42	▼3.77
CPI hold		Swing	▲4.67	

=== 2016 ===
There were 1,62,632 registered voters in the constituency for the 2016 Kerala Assembly election.

2016 Kerala Legislative Assembly election: Vaikom
Party	Candidate	Votes	%	±%
CPI	C. K. Asha	61,997	46.95	▼4.67
INC	A. Saneeshkumar	37,413	28.50	▼14.41
BDJS	N. K. Neelakandan	30,067	22.90	−
NOTA	None of the above	800	0.61	−
BSP	K. C. Chandrasekharan	540	0.41	▼0.16
PDP	Subeesh Surendran	489	0.37	−
SUCI(C)	Anila Bose	420	0.32	▼0.02
CPI(M-L)	K. C. Prakash	204	0.15	−
Independent	Kuttan Kattachira	118	0.09	−
Margin of victory		24,584	18.70	▲9.91
Turnout		1,32,048	81.19	▲2.04
CPI hold		Swing	▲4.67	

=== 2011 ===
There were 1,53,205 registered voters in the constituency for the 2011 election.

2011 Kerala Legislative Assembly election: Vaikom
Party	Candidate	Votes	%	±%
CPI	K. Ajith	62,603	51.62	
INC	A. Saneeshkumar	52,035	42.91	−
BJP	Ramesh Kavimattam	4,512	3.72	−
Independent	K. Sanesh	691	0.57	−
BSP	P. K. Prakashan	645	0.53	
SUCI(C)	K .S. Sasikala	412	0.34	−
Independent	M. K. Dasan	367	0.30	
Margin of victory		10,568	8.71	
Turnout		1,21,265	79.15	
CPI hold		Swing		

=== 2006 ===
2006 Kerala Legislative Assembly election: Vaikom
Party	Candidate	Votes	%	±%
CPI	K. Ajith	52,617	52.07	
INC	V. P. Sajeendran	43,836	43.38	
BJP	K. K. Karunakaran	2,443	2.42	
Independent	V. Jijy	761	0.75	
BSP	P. Shanmughan	462	0.46	
Independent	Ajithkumar	381	0.38	
Independent	T. Aji	322	0.32	
Independent	K. K. Janardhanan	238	0.24	
Margin of victory		8,781	8.7	
Turnout		1,01,066	72.7	
CPI hold		Swing		

=== 2001 ===
2001 Kerala Legislative Assembly election: Vaikom
Party	Candidate	Votes	%	±%
CPI	P. Narayanan	54,675	51.13	
INC	K. V. Padmanabhan	46,922	43.88	
BJP	K. P. Hari	3,787	3.54	
Independent	P. T. Jaya	803	0.75	
Independent	C. K. Sivadasan	439	0.41	
Independent	C. B. Ramanan	312	0.29	
Margin of victory		7,753	7.2	
Turnout		1,06,943	75.7	
CPI hold		Swing		

== See also ==
- Vaikom
- Kottayam district
- List of constituencies of the Kerala Legislative Assembly
- 2016 Kerala Legislative Assembly election
