= C. K. Asha =

Indian politician

- സി.കെ. ആശ
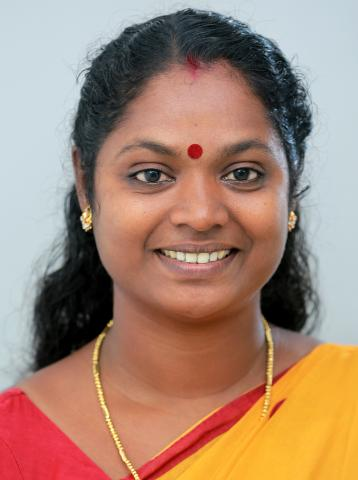

Member of the Kerala Legislative Assembly
- In office 2 June 2016 – 23 May 2026
- Preceded by: K. Ajith
- Succeeded by: K.Binimon
- Constituency: Vaikom

Personal details
- Born: 20 May 1976 (age 49) Vaikom, Kottayam, Kerala, India
- Party: Communist Party of India

C. K. Asha (born 20 May 1976) is an Indian politician and a member of the Communist Party of India. She was a member of the Kerala Legislative Assembly, representing the Vaikom constituency. She is the former Vice President of All India Students Federation District Committee Kottayam. She was also two-time vice-chairperson of St. Xavier's College, Kothavara.

== Early life ==
Asha is the daughter of K. Chellappan and V. B. Bhasurangi. She was born at Vaikom on 20 May 1976. She held positions of Vice President, A.I.S.F. Kottayam District Committee; State Committee Member, A.I.S.F.; Vice Chairperson, College Union, St. Xavier's College, Kothavara (two times); Member, Mahilasangam Mandalam Committee; C.P.I. Branch Executive Member.

== Political career ==
C. K. Asha was elected as a member of the Kerala Legislative Assembly, from Vaikom constituency. She was one among the 11% of women in the LDF government of 2016.

In 2021, Asha won the Vaikom constituency by defeating P. R. Sona of the Indian National Congress with a high margin of 29122 votes.
