= Sudheersha Palode =

Indian politician (born 1987)

Sudheersha Palode (born 1987) is an Indian politician from Kerala. He is a member of the Kerala Legislative Assembly from the Vamanapuram Assembly constituency representing the Indian National Congress.

Palode is from Kollurkonam, Palode, Thiruvananthapuram district, Kerala. He is the son of A. Salahudheen. He completed his B.Sc. in mathematics at Iqbal College, Kerala University in 2008. He is into farming. He is the district president of the Youth Congress, the youth wing of the Congress Party. He declared assets worth Rs.33 lakhs in his affidavit to the Election Commission of India.

== Career ==
Palode won the Vamanapuram Assembly constituency representing the Indian National Congress in the 2026 Kerala Legislative Assembly election. He polled 73,590 votes and defeated his nearest rival, D. K. Murali of the Communist Party of India (Marxist), by a margin of 12,185 votes. The CPM has faced defeat for the first time in 50 years in this constituency.
