= M. K. Keshavan =

Indian politician

M. K. Keshavan (1936 – 10 July 1997) was an Indian politician and leader of Communist Party of India. He represented Vaikom constituency in 5th, 6th, 7th and 10th KLA.
