= P. Narayanan =

Indian politician (1951–2020)

P. Narayanan (January 31, 1951 - August 6, 2020) was an Indian politician and leader of Communist Party of India. He represented Vaikom constituency in 10th KLA and 11th KLA.
