= Amal Pirappancode =

Indian artist and Malayalam language writer

Amal
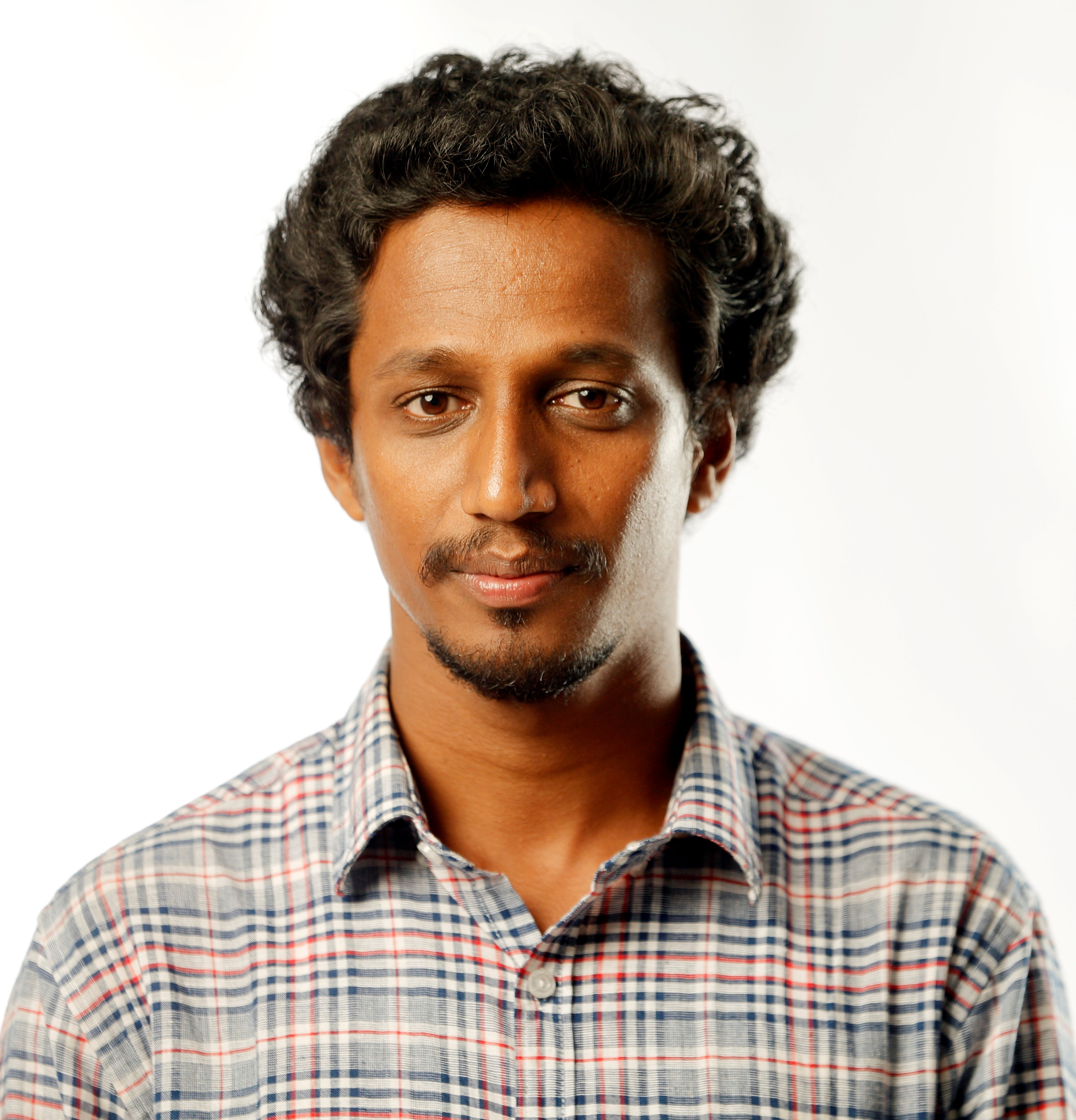
- Amal
- Born: 1987 (age 38–39); Pirappancode, Thiruvananthapuram district, Kerala
- Education: Visva-Bharati University, Santiniketan, India
- Occupations: Short story writer, Novelist, and Cartoonist
- Writing career
- Notable works: Vyasanasamuchayam, Kalhanan, Keniya San
- Notable awards: Yuva Puraskar; Kerala Sahitya Akademi Geetha Hiranyan Endowment

Amal Pirappancode is a Malayalam language novelist, short story writer, illustrator, graphic novelist and C cartoonist from Kerala, India. His novel Vyasanasamuchayam has won the 2018 Yuva Puraskar and the Basheer Yuva Prathibha Award. He has also received several other awards including Kerala Sahitya Akademi Geetha Hiranyan Endowment.

== Biography ==
Amal was born in 1987 to Thenguvila veettil Maniraj and Baby at Pirappancode, Thiruvananthapuram district. He done his education at Pirappancode Government Primary School and Pirappancode Higher Secondary School. From childhood, he was interested in painting. He later became a cartoonist and his cartoons have been published in several magazines. He passed his graduation in painting from Mavelikkara Raja Ravi Varma College of Fine Arts and Post Graduation in Art History from Visva-Bharati Santiniketan, Kolkata. After Post Graduation, He first got teaching job at Government Arts College, Thiruvananthapuram. After 3 years working at Arts college, he lost his job and went into journalism and worked for an online media for some time. Then he joined as art history teacher at Raja Ravi Varma Center of Excellence for Visual Arts, Mavelikkara. He studied Japanese language in Tokyo, Japan.

== Family ==
His wife Kumiko Tanaka is a Japanese woman who studied with him in Kolkata Shantiniketan. One of his brothers Jith Pirappancode is a production controller in the Malayalam film industry, another brother Amith Raj is an assistant-director.

== Works ==
=== Short stories ===
- Narakathinte tattoo (Meaning:Tattoo of Hell), 2011, D.C. Books, Kottayam, ISBN 9788126432660.
- Manja cardukalude suvishesham (Meaning: Gospel of Yellow Cards), 2015, Chintha Publishers, Thiruvananthapuram, ISBN 9789385018756.
- Parasyakkaran theruvu (Meaning: Advertiser Street), 2016, Poorna Publications, Kozhikode, ISBN 9788130017563.
- Keniyasan, 2021, Mathrubhumi Books, Kozhikode, ISBN 9789390574261.
- Pathakam, vazha kolapathakam, 2018, D.C. Books, Kottayam, ISBN 9788126477609.
- Uruvam, 2022, DC Books, Kottayam

=== Novels ===
- Kalhanan, 2013, D.C. Books, Kottayam, ISBN 9788126448944.
- Vyasanasamuchayam, 2015, D.C. Books, Kottayam, ISBN 9788126465514.
- Anweshippin kandethum, 2018, Insight Publica, Kozhikode, ISBN 9789387398160.
- Bengali kalapam, 2019, Mathrubhumi Books, Kozhikode, ISBN 9788126477609

=== Graphic novels and stories ===
- Kallan Pavithran, 2014, ISBN 9788126452255 (Graphical representation of the work of P. Padmarajan)
- Dyoayartham, 2015.
- Vimanam, 2012 (Children's literature).

=== Cartoon collection ===
- Mullu

=== Others ===
- The story, dialogues and screenplay (jointly with Ambili) of Ambili S Rengan's Malayalam language film Idi Mazha Kaatu was done by him.

== Awards and honors ==
- Kendra Sahitya Akademi Yuva Award (2018).
- Kerala Sahitya Akademi Geetha Hiranyan Endowment (2019)
- Vaikkom Muhammad Basheer yuva prathibha (young talent) Award (2018).
- Unyem Amikal The Mahi Award
- E.P. Sushma Anganam Endowment (2016)
- Thakazhi Story Award
- M. Sukumaran Story Award
- CV Sriraman Story Award (2017)
- Mundur Story Award
- A. Mahmood Story Award (2013)
- Muttathu varky College Story Award (2008)
- Rajalakshmi Story Award (2008)
- Poorna Uroob College Story Award (2007)
- First SBT College Story Award
- Akam Story Award
- Harishree Katha Award (2016)
- Siddhartha Novel Award (2017)
- K. Saraswati Amma Novel Award (2017)
- Kolkata Malayalee Society Tirur Thunchanparambu Endowment (2012)
- Kozhikode Dronacharya Yuva Pratibha Award for the story Manja cardukalude Suvishesham
- Kadal Karayedukkunna Rathri was selected as one of the best stories in the MP Narayana Pillai story competition conducted by Samakalika Malayalam Weekly.
