= Kalangara Kunjukrishnan =

Indian politician

Member of the Kerala Legislative Assembly
- In office 1957–1959
- Succeeded by: Baby John
- Constituency: Karunagappalli

Personal details
- Born: November 1912
- Died: 1974

A. Kunjukrishnan (1912–1975), popularly known as Kalangara Kunjukrishnan was a political leader who was a member of Kerala Legislative Assembly. He represented the Karunagappalli constituency in the first Kerala Legislative Assembly as a congress representative. He worked as a lawyer at Kollam and was a Member of Travancore Devaswom Board.
