= K. Binimon =

Indian politician (born 1980)

Kunjumani Binimon (born 1980) is an Indian politician from Kerala. He is a member of the Kerala Legislative Assembly from the Vaikom Assembly constituency, which is reserved for Scheduled Caste community, in Kottayam district representing the Indian National Congress.

== Early life ==
Binimon is from Vaikom, Kottayam district, Kerala. He is the son of Kunjumani. He completed an M.A. in Gandhian Thought at M.G. University in 2005, and later a B.Ed. in Social Sciences also at Mahatma Gandhi University in 2007. He declared assets worth Rs.6 lakhs in his affidavit to the Election Commission of India.

== Career ==
Binimon won the Vaikom Assembly constituency representing the Indian National Congress in the 2026 Kerala Legislative Assembly election. He polled 52,944 votes and defeated his nearest rival, P. Pradeep of the Communist Party of India, by a margin of1,360 votes.
