= Pirappancode =

- village
- Location in Kerala, India Pirappancode (India)
- Coordinates: 8°39′0″N 76°55′0″E
- Country: India
- State: Kerala
- District: Thiruvananthapuram

Government
  - Body: Gram panchayat

Languages
  - Official: Malayalam, English
- Time zone: UTC+5:30 (IST)
- PIN: 695607
- Coastline: 0 kilometres (0 mi)

Pirappancode is a village in Thiruvananthapuram district, Kerala.

== Notable people ==
- Amal Pirappancode, writer and artist
- Pirappancode Murali, writer and politician
