= C. R. Mahesh =

Indian politician

- സി.ആർ.മഹേഷ്‌

Member of the Kerala Legislative Assembly
- Incumbent
- Assumed office 24 May 2021
- Preceded by: R. Ramachandran
- Constituency: Karunagappally

Personal details
- Born: 1979 (age 46–47) Karunagappalli, Kollam, Kerala, India
- Party: Indian National Congress
- Spouse: Gayathri S.
- Children: 3
- Education: Bachelor of Arts (Politics)
- Alma mater: Dewaswom Board College, Sasthamcotta

C. Rajashekharan Mahesh is an Indian politician from Kerala and a member of the Indian National Congress, as well as a member of the Kerala Legislative Assembly from Karunagappally. Earlier, he was the vice president of youth congress, Kerala. Currently he is an AICC member of INC and general secretary of Kerala Pradesh Congress Committee.

== Early life & Political career ==
C. R. Mahesh was born as the son of CA Rajashekharan in a family with communist political background. His grandfather, Kaithavana Appukkuttan Pillai, was an active communist party worker, who participated in the Vallikunnam Meni Samaram, a political riot to save the labour rights of paddy field workers. His father, the late C. A. Rajasekharan was a CPI worker. His brother, the late C. R. Manoj, who died on 4 August 2021, was an active worker of the CPI, served as the assistant local secretary of CPI, Thazhava committee.

Mahesh started his political career as the unit president of Kerala Students Union (Students Organization of the Indian National Congress in Kerala) in Karunagappally model school. Later, he joined for the higher studies in Political Science at Devaswom Board College, Sasthamcotta. During his college days, he continued his political work with Kerala Students Union, and became the unit president of KSU in college. In the year of 2000, he got elected as the Union Chairman of Sasthamcotta DB College.

In the 2005 local body election, he got elected as the member of Thazhava panchayath.

Mahesh held several positions like General Secretary of KSU Kollam district committee. Executive Member of Kerala Students Union state committee. General secretary of Youth Congress District committee, Kollam. President of Youth Congress District committee, Kollam.

- 2013 : Mahesh became the elected vice president of Indian Youth Congress, Kerala.
- 2016 : Mahesh contested from Karunagappally assembly constituency where he lost to CPI candidate R. Ramachandran by a margin of 1,759 votes.
- Worked as the Member of Kerala State Youth Welfare Board.
- Considering his organizing skills and leadership qualities, he got nominated as the member of All India Congress Committee and later as the general secretary of Kerala Pradesh Congress Committee.
- 2021 : Mahesh got elected to the Kerala Legislative Assembly from Karunagappally constituency in the 2021 Kerala Legislative Assembly election by defeating LDF sitting MLA R. Ramachandran by a record margin of 29,208 votes.
