= Pirappancode Murali =

Indian politician (born 1943)

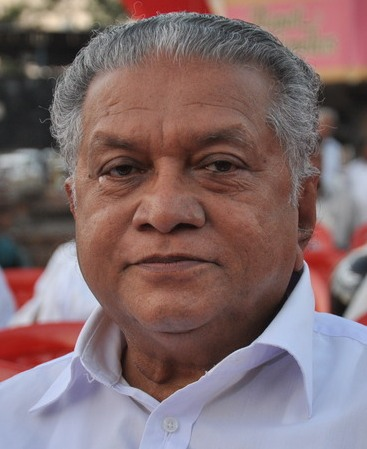
- Pirappancode Murali

Member of the Kerala Legislative Assembly
- In office 1996–2006
- Preceded by: Koliakode N. Krishnan Nair
- Succeeded by: J. Arundhathi
- Constituency: Vamanapuram constituency

Personal details
- Born: Murali; 12 June 1943 (age 83) Pirappancode, Thiruvananthapuram, British India
- Party: Communist Party of India (Marxist)
- Spouse: P. Radha Devi
- Children: 1
- Parent: N. N.Sankaranarayana Kurup. L.Bharathiyamma

Pirappancode Murali (born 12 June 1943) is a noted poet, lyricist, playwright, library activist and politician from Kerala, India. He represented Vamanapuram constituency in the 10th and 11th Kerala Assembly. He wrote lyrics for over fifty plays and wrote ten plays. He was one of the founders of theatre troupe Sangha Chetana. He got many awards including Government of Kerala Award for Best Lyricist and Kerala Sahitya Akademi Award for Best Playwright.

== Biography ==
Murali was born on 12 June 1943 in Pirappancode, Thiruvananthapuram district to N. Sankaranarayana Kurup and L. Bharathiyamma.

He was a member of the AISF District Committee from 1960 to 1963. He joined CPI in 1962 and after splitting became member of CPI(M). From 1972 he is CPI (M) District Committee member and from 1991 he is CPI (M) District Secretariat member. He was one of the founding state committee members of the Kerala Socialist Youth Federation (KSYF) and became State General Secretary of KSYF from 1974 to 1977. He also held several other positions like Manikkal Panchayat President (1979-1984), Member of the Thiruvananthapuram District Council (1990-1994), District President of the Kerala Karshaka Sangham (Kerala Farmers association) and Member of the Karshaka sangam State Working Committee from 1992.

He was elected to the Kerala Granthashala sangam (Kerala Library Association) district committee in 1992 and later held several other positions in Karshaka Sangam including district secretary, state general body member and executive committee member. Editor-in-Chief of State Library Council's distinguished magazine Granthalokam; he held several other positions including state committee member of the Purogamana Kala Sahitya Sangham (Progressive Art and Literature Society), member of the Senate of the University of Kerala (1980-1984), member of the Thonnakkal Ashan Memorial Committee (1987-1991) and executive committee member of the Kerala Sangeetha Nataka Akademi.

He wrote and published many poetry collections; wrote lyrics for more than 50 plays; he was one of the founding members of 'Sangha Chetana', a dynamic theatre troupe in Malayalam theatre.

== Works ==
- Sangha Gadha (lyrics)
- Sangha Ganam (lyrics)
- Swathi Thirunal (drama)
- Thottam (Poetic drama)
- Sakhavu (play) Chinta Publishers, Hindi translation of ' Sakhavu' is also published.
- Jathavedasse Mizhithurakkoo, Sahithya Pravarthaka Co-operative Society Ltd. ISBN 9789391946289
- ONV Kavyasamskriti, memoir, Kerala Bhasha institute ISBN 9788120042704
- Ente ONV
- Pazhassiraja, Sahithya Pravarthaka Co-operative Society Ltd. ISBN 9780000172044
- Subhadre Suryapthri (Play), National Book Stall,
- Ramanan: Oru Pranayagatha (Play), Kerala Grandhasala Sangham

== Family ==
He and his wife P. Radha Devi have one daughter Smitha Murali.

== Awards and honours ==
- 1998 Government of Kerala Award for Best Lyricist
- 1989 Kerala Sahitya Akademi Award for Drama
- 1996 Nana Award for Best Lyricist
- 2002 Abu Dhabi Sakthi Award (Drama)
- 2020 Kerala Sangeetha Nataka Akademi Fellowship
