= C. Divakaran =

Indian politician

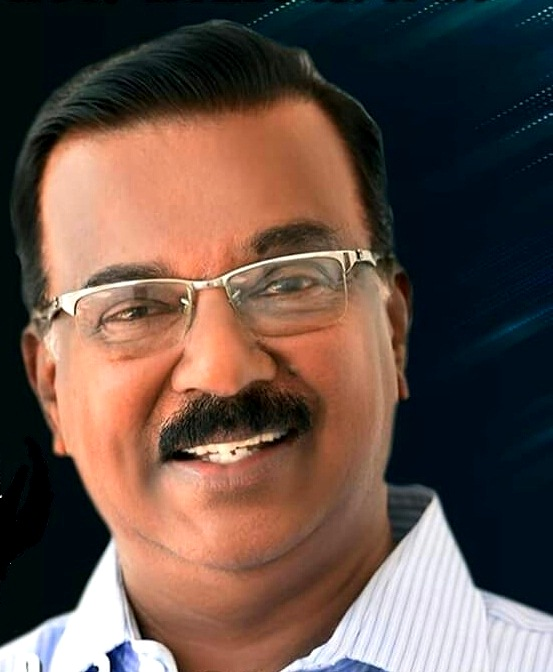

Member of Kerala Legislative Assembly
- In office 2 June 2016 – 24 May 2021
- Preceded by: Palode Ravi
- Succeeded by: G. R. Anil
- Constituency: Nedumangad
- In office 24 May 2006 – 2 June 2016
- Preceded by: A. N. Rajan Babu
- Succeeded by: R. Ramachandran
- Constituency: Karunagappally

Minister of Food & Civil Supplies, Government of Kerala
- In office 18 May 2006 – 14 May 2011
- Chief Minister: V. S. Achuthanandan
- Preceded by: Adoor Prakash
- Succeeded by: T.M. Jacob

Personal details
- Born: 4 September 1942 (age 84) Thiruvananthapuram, Travancore, British India
- Party: Communist Party of India
- Spouse: Hemalatha
- Children: One son and one daughter
- Education: B.A., BEd
- Website: www.cdivakaran.in

C. Divakaran (born 4 September 1942) is an Indian politician, from Thiruvananthapuram, Kerala. He is a State Executive Member of Communist Party of India (CPI), and National Working Committee Member of All India Trade Union Congress (AITUC). A former Minister of Food and Civil Supplies in the Government of Kerala. He represented the Karunagappalli constituency in Kollam district from 2006 to 2016 and from 2016 to 2021 represented Nedumangad constituency in Thiruvananthapuram, in the Kerala Legislative Assembly. He is a vivid writer and published 3 books.

== Early life and family ==
Divakaran was born on 4 September 1942 to C. K. Shivarama Panikkar and Ammukuttyamma at Thiruvananthapuram in Kerala. His initial schooling was in Kamaleshwaram Government School and then at SMV High School, Thiruvananthapuram. In 1957, he was appointed the first prime minister of the school parliament, a new concept introduced by the efforts of the then efforts of the Education Minister Prof. Joseph Mundassery in E.M.S.Namboodhiripad's ministry. This marked a turning point in his school and political career. Later he joined Thiruvananthapuram University College to do his degree course.

He was elected as a General Secretary of MG college pre-university association and magazine editor at University college. His writing, his own preaching style and a prominent personality made C Divakaran the favorite in the college.

After his B.A. and BEd degrees he started working as a teacher at Ottasekharamangalam and K.S.Abhraham Memorial Higher Secondary school at Thirumala, Thiruvananthapuram. He is living with his wife Smt. T.V.Hemalatha and 2 children in Manacaud at Thiruvananthapuram.

== Political career ==
C Divakaran is active in politics for over 50 years, based out of the capital city Thiruvananthapuram. He is a prominent and popular leader of the Communist Party of India. He started his political journey during college days. After graduating, he started working as a teacher, but to concentrate on party affairs he quit teaching and became full-time party worker.

C Divakaran held many positions and responsibilities before contesting in the assembly election. In 1972 he was elected as CPI district council assistant secretary. He was jailed in connection with "Job or Jail" strike. During his political career, he held several posts, including State General Secretary of All India Trade Union Congress (AITUC), State Secretariat member of CPI, National Executive member of CPI, and All India Vice-President of AITUC.

From 2006–2016, he represented Karunagappalli constituency in the state assembly. In the year 2006-2011 he was the Minister for Food and Civil Supplies, Consumer Protection, Dairy Developments, Milk Co-operatives, and Animal Husbandry in V.S.Achudhananthan ministry.

In the year 2016, he won the assembly election in Nedumangad constituency. He was the LDF candidate for Thiruvananthapuram in the 2019 Lok Sabha election, but defeated by UDF candidate Shashi Tharoor.

He is also the Chairman of Prabhath Book House, the publishing house of Communist Party of India in Kerala. He had published many books including an essay collection titled "lokathe njetticha vediyochakalkku pinnil" (Behind the gunshots that shook the world), a travelogue titled Nirangalude China (The Colorful China), Rashtriyam Smarana Prabhashanam (collection of articles).

== See also ==
- Kerala Council of Ministers
