= R. Ramachandran (politician) =

Indian politician (1952–2023)

R. Ramachandran ആര്‍ രാമചന്ദ്രൻ MLA
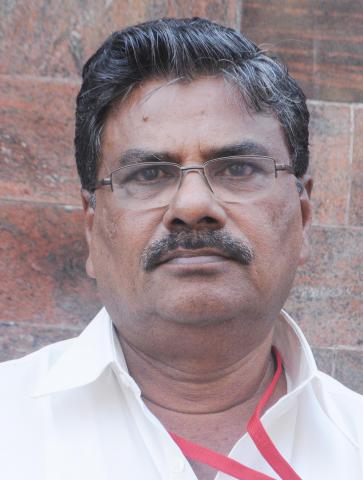

Member of the Kerala Legislative Assembly for Karunagappally
- In office 19 May 2016 – 2 May 2021
- Preceded by: C. Divakaran
- Succeeded by: C. R. Mahesh
- Constituency: Karunagappally (State Assembly constituency)

Personal details
- Born: 15 October 1952 Kallelibhagom, Karunagappally, Travancore–Cochin, India
- Died: 21 November 2023 (aged 71) Kochi, Kerala, India
- Party: Communist Party of India

R. Ramachandran (15 October 1952 – 21 November 2023) was an Indian politician in the Communist Party of India. He served as the member of Kerala Legislative Assembly from the Karunagappally from 2016 to 2021.

== Death ==
Ramachandran died of liver disease at a hospital in Kochi, on 21 November 2023, at the age of 71.
