= Dewaswom Board College =

- Motto: 'Amrutham Tu Vidya'
- Motto in English: 'Knowledge is Eternal'
- Type: Public
- Location: Kerala, India
- Language: English

The Travancore Devaswom Board is a semi-government organisation in the erstwhile Travancore, now southern part of the State of Kerala in India, constituted to manage the Hindu Temples in Kerala, with its head office at Nandancode in the state capital Thiruvananthapuram. The famous Sastha temple Sabarimala, in the Pathanamthitta district of Kerala, is also under the management of this organisation.

== Structure ==
In addition to various other educational institutions, there are four aided colleges under the management of The Honourable Board. They are:

- D. B. College, Sasthamcotta, Kollam {erstwhile Quilon} district
- D. B. College, Thalayolaparambu, Kottayam district
- D. B. Pampa College, Parumala, Mannar, Pathanamthitta district
- Sree Ayyappa College, Eramallikkara, Chengannur

=== Sasthamkotta ===
Kumbalathu Sankupillai Memorial Devaswom Board College, better known as D. B. College, Sasthamcotta is affiliated to the University of Kerala imparting knowledge to the community since 1964. The college offers U.G. programmes in sixteen disciplines and P.G. programmes in six. The departments of Commerce and chemistry are approved research centers of the University of Kerala. During its growth and development into a full-fledged Post-Graduate College, the institution was headed by eminent personalities. The Well known dramatist (the late) Prof.G. Sankara Pillai was the Head of Department of Malayalam. The alumni of the college include eminent cine artist (the late) Bharat Murali, Pravasi Samman recipient Dr. Ravi Pillai, famous author K.R. Meera, famous writer and actor P. Balachandran, Eminent scientists, engineers, politicians, etc.
The college is accredited with A grade by the NAAC.

=== Thalayolaparambu ===
D. B. College, Thalayolaparambu the second educational institution of its kind managed by the Travancore Devaswom Board, was established in 1965. The college is affiliated to the Mahatma Gandhi University, Kottayam. The college had its affiliation to the Kerala University in the beginning and when the Mahatma Gandhi University, Kottayam was established in 1983, the college came under its jurisdiction. The institution initially started functioning as a Junior College in 1965 with 6 batches of Pre-degree classes and a students strength of 480.

In 1972 the college was upgraded as a Degree College with the induction of BA Malayalam, Politics and BSc. Botany. The college now offers Degree courses in Mathematics, English, Physics, Chemistry, Hindi and Commerce also. They also have Post Graduate courses in Mathematics, Physics, Chemistry and Malayalam.

The student strength of the college at present is nearly 1150. There are fifty six members on the Teaching Staff and 43 members on the Non-Teaching Staff. The college is situated in Thalayolaparambu, a rural area far from the din and bustle of city life. The college campus spreads on both sides of Thalayolaparambu-Ernakulam road. It is spread over 22 acres (89,000 m^{2}) of greenery.
