= T. V. Vijayarajan =

Indian politician

Member of the Kerala Legislative Assembly
- In office 1982–1987
- Preceded by: B. M. Sheriff
- Succeeded by: P. S. Sreenivasan
- Constituency: Karunagapally

Personal details
- Born: 7 September 1934
- Died: 22 December 1997

T. V. Vijayarajan (7 September 1934 – 22 December 1997) was an Indian politician and MLA, who was one of the important leaders of the Kerala Revolutionary Socialist Party. He represented Karunagapally in the seventh Kerala Legislative Assembly.
