= K. Ajith =

Indian politician

Kesavan Ajith is an Indian politician who is a member of the Bharatiya Janata Party. He served as a member of the Kerala Legislative Assembly representing Vaikom constituency from 2006 to 2016. On 3 March 2026, he joined the Bharatiya Janata Party after having been a member of the Communist Party of India for 40 years.

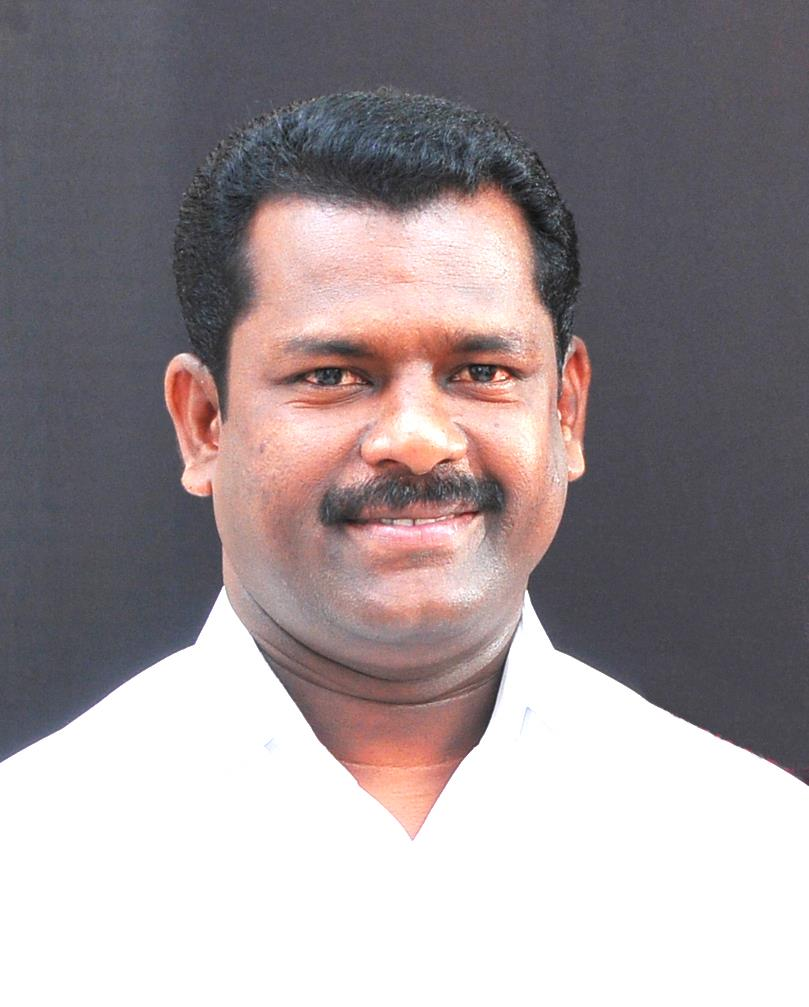
K. Ajith

== Personal life ==
He was born in Vaikom on 25 May 1971 to Dalit leader as well as former CPI Leader M. K. Kesavan and Thankamma. He is married to Sindhu and they have Two children, one daughter and a son.
