= K. M. George =

K. M. George may refer to:

- K. M. George (politician), political leader and founder of Kerala Congress
- K. M. George (writer), Malayalam writer, scholar and literary critic
- Kayalakakam M. George, banker and former CEO of Palai Central Bank
