= D. K. Murali =

Indian politician

Adv. D. K. Murali
- ഡി. കെ. മുരളി
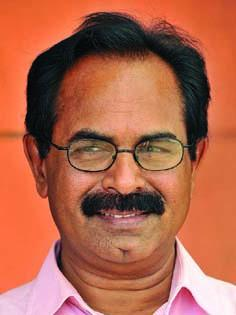

Member of the Kerala Legislative Assembly
- In office 2016–2016
- Preceded by: Koliakode N. Krishnan Nair
- Succeeded by: Sudheersha Palode
- Constituency: Vamanapuram

Personal details
- Born: Muraleedharan Nair D. K. 31 July 1961 (age 65)
- Party: Communist Party of India (Marxist)
- Parent(s): V. Damodaran Nair; T. P. Jagadamma

Muraleedharan Nair D. K., better known as D. K. Murali is the former member of Kerala Legislative Assembly. He represented Vamanapuram constituency and belongs to Communist Party of India (Marxist). His entry to politics was through Students Federation of India (SFI). He became one of the prominent leaders of CPI(M) in Thiruvananthapuram district. He is the district committee member and state council member of All India Lawyers Union.
