= A. N. Rajan Babu =

Indian politician

A. N. Rajan Babu is the leader of Janathipathiya Samrakshana Samithy. He was a Member of Legislative Assembly from Karunagappally. He became General Secretary of JSS in February 2021. He was the former President of JSS.

He is from Mezhuveli, Pathanamthitta District, in Southern India.
