= Clappana =

- Village
- Interactive map of Clappana
- Coordinates: 9°6′0″N 76°30′0″E
- Country: India
- State: Kerala
- District: Kollam

Government
  - Type: Panchayati raj (India)
  - Body: Gram panchayat

Population (2011)
  - Total: 22,250

Languages
  - Official: Malayalam, English
- Time zone: UTC+5:30 (IST)
- PIN: 690528
- Telephone code: 0476
- Vehicle registration: KL-23
- Nearest city: Kollam
- Literacy: 94.7%
- Lok Sabha: Alappuzha
- Assembly: Karunagapally

Clappana is a village in Kollam district in the state of Kerala, India. Thottathil mukku, Alumpeedika and Puthan Pura Mukku is one of the major junctions in thedistrics..the border kollam alappuzha districts

History

Legend has it that once the bulls brought to the Ochira temple were tied to palm trees in this area, the place was known as Kalapana and later became Clappana. The name history of Clappana begins with agricultural prosperity. Known as the paddy field of Onnatukara, Clappana was a land of vast agricultural lands and hardworking people. When the harvest season came, it was customary to bring cattle for plowing in groups from the southern countries. They camped in the southern region of Clappana, where palm trees abounded. There was a playground for relaxation and a water pantal to quench thirst. Thanneerkarasseri, the family of that day, which was responsible for providing water for thirst, still remains there under the same name. With the passage of time, the name clappana came to mean the land of palm trees, where the traders used to tie their bullocks during their leisure time. Many of the name stories of clappana, which have been handed down from ear to ear, remain. One of them, namely trust, is related to the centralized system of governance. The chieftains, who controlled the land by force and money, used to take huge bulls to the countryside they were targeting and tie them up. To free the bulls, they would fight with those who were trying to free them, and if they won, they would take over the territory as well. Thus clappana, meaning the palm tied to the bull, eventually evolved into clappana following the history of a bull that was tied up in one of the forests of these regions for lust for power. Another story related to faith still remains in the history pages of Clappana. There was a huge palm tree next to the chirakadav temple in the southern half of clappana. No matter how many polished oil lamps were lit under that palm tree, the lamp would catch fire within seconds. It came to be known as 'Klavupana' in the belief that it is the palm with special siddhi that is used to stick the lamp. In the great flow of time, 'Klavupana' became clappana as generations changed.

== Demographics-Census Data 2011 ==
Information	Figure	Remark
Population	22250	
Males	10428	
Females	11822	
0-6 age group	2138	9.61% of population
Female sex ratio	1134	state av=1084
literacy rate	93.85 %	state av=94.0
Male literacy	96.07 %	
Female literacy	91.93 %	
Scheduled Caste	7.21%	
scheduled tribe	0.23%	
