= Vamanapuram =

- village
- Location in Kerala, India Vamanapuram (India)
- Coordinates: 8.7251°N 76.9012°E
- Country: India
- State: Kerala
- District: Thiruvananthapuram
- Talukas: Nedumangad

Government
  - Body: Gram panchayat

Population (2011)
  - Total: 21,038

Languages
  - Official: Malayalam, English
- Time zone: UTC+5:30 (IST)
- PIN: 695606
- Telephone code: 0472
- Vehicle registration: KL-16, KL-21, KL-01
- Nearest city: Attingal, Kilimanoor, Venjaramodu
- Lok Sabha constituency: Attingal
- Vidhan Sabha constituency: Vamanapuram
- Website: http://www.lsgkerala.in/vamanapurampanchayat

Vamanapuram is a village in the Thiruvananthapuram district of Kerala, India.

== Demographics ==
As of 2011 India census, Vamanapuram had a population of 21,038 with 9,653 males and 11,385 females.

== Geography ==
Vamanapuram is at 8°41′0″N 76°56′0″E on Main Central Road, approximately 32 km from Thiruvananthapuram in Thiruvananthapuram District, Kerala. It is on the banks of the Vamanapuram River..
