= Bharath Dharma Jana Sena =

Political party

- Abbreviation: BDJS
- President: Thushar Vellappally
- General Secretary: T. V. Babu
- Founded: December 2015; 10 years ago
- Alliance: NDA
- Seats in Rajya Sabha: 0 / 9
- Seats in Lok Sabha: 0 / 20
- Seats in Keralam Legislative Assembly: 0 / 140

Party flag
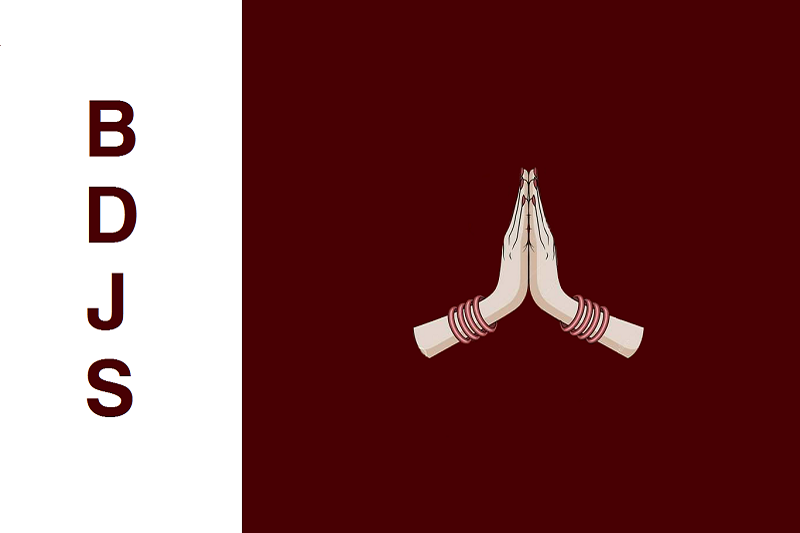

Bharath Dharma Jana Sena (BDJS) is a political party in India. Thushar Vellappally is the current national president of BDJS. BDJS is a constituent of the National Democratic Alliance in the state of Kerala.

BDJS is the political wing of SNDP Yogam. In 1976, the SNDP had formed the Socialist Republican Party (SRP) which won two seats in the 1982 Kerala Legislative Assembly election but soon faded into oblivion due to internal issues.

In February 2021, BDJS split and a faction under the leadership of M. K. Neelakandan Master declared a new political party, Bharathiya Jana Sena (BJS). BDJS is part of the Central government administration through various chairmanship of Central boards and corporations.

== Electoral performance ==
In the 2016 Kerala Legislative Assembly election, BDJS was part of National Democratic Alliance and contested in 37 seats (out of 140) but won none In the 2019 Lok Sabha election in Kerala, BDJS contested in 4 seats (out of 20) and won none. Party president Thushar Vellapally contested in Wayanad and lost by a huge margin against Rahul Gandhi.

Loksabha election results in Kerala
Election Year	Seats contested	Seats won	Total Votes	Percentage of votes	+/- Vote
2024	4	0 / 20	505,753	2.56%	▲0.68%
2019	4	0 / 20	380,847	1.88%	New

Kerala Legislative Assembly election results
Election Year	Seats contested	Seats won	Total Votes	Percentage of votes	+/- Vote
2026	22	0 / 140	2,89,623	1.34%	▲0.28%
2021	21	0 / 140	217,445	1.06%	▼2.94%
2016	36	0 / 140	795,797	4.00%	New
