= Janathipathiya Samrakshana Samithy =

Janadhipathya Samrakshana Samithi
- Abbreviation: JSS
- General Secretary: A. N. Rajan Babu
- Founder: K. R. Gouri Amma
- Founded: 19 March 1994 (32 years ago)
- Split from: Communist Party of India (Marxist)
- Headquarters: Kerala State Committee Office, Iron Bridge P.O., Alleppey-688011, Kerala
- Ideology: Communism; Marxism
- National affiliation: UDF (1994-2013, 2021-Present); LDF (2013–2021)

Election symbol
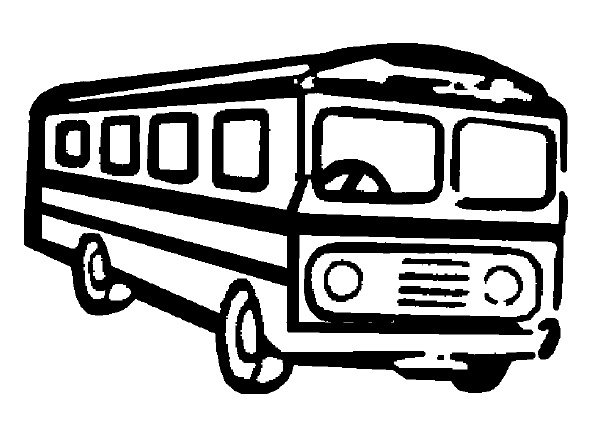

Party flag
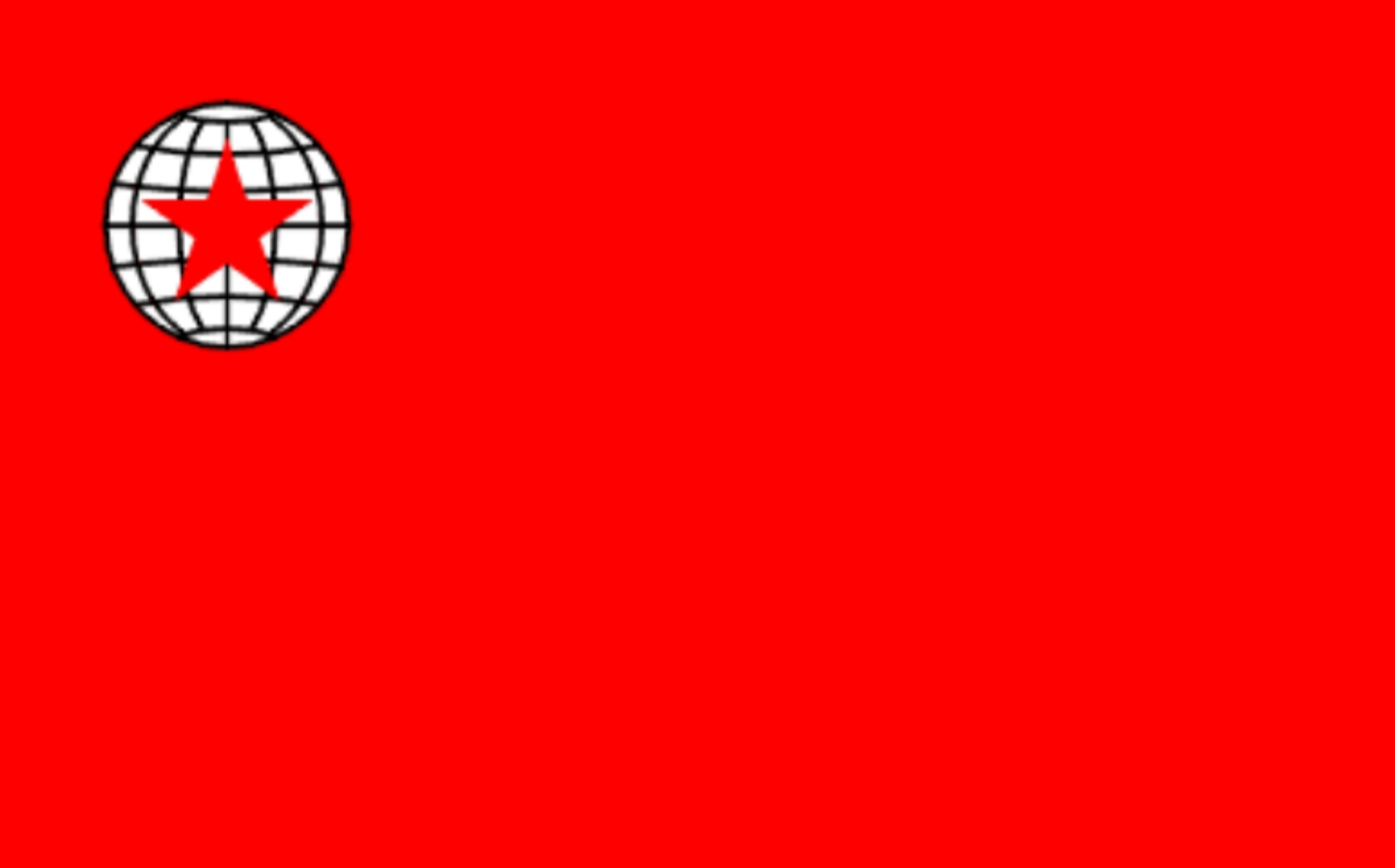

Janadhipathya Samrakshana Samithi ( translation: Association for Defence of Democracy) is a political party in the Indian state of Kerala. The party was formed in 1994 when the CPI(M) leader K.R. Gowri Amma was expelled from Communist Party of India (Marxist).

JSS Sathjith group is allianced with United Democratic Front in Kerala led by Indian National congress. JSS won four seats in the 2001 Legislative Assembly election in Kerala (the party had launched candidates in five constituencies). K.R. Gowri Amma, elected from the Aroor constituency, was the Minister for Agriculture in the A.K. Antony state government.

== Special Notes ==
1. One of their prominent state leader from the beginning of the party, Adv. Sathjith's faction make outside alliance with LDF after discussions with state leaders of LDF in March 2016.

2. The Rajan Babu faction of the JSS Joined the NDA on 11 March 2016. This was Announced by Rajan Babu. After Discussions with BJP State President Kummanam Rajasekharan and BDJS Leader Vellappally Natesan at Kayamkulam. And he left NDA in 2019 and merge with JSS (Gowri amma)

3.The president of JSS, A. V. Thamarakshan was expelled from party for anti-party activities. The faction led by A V Thamarakshan is merged to Hindustani Awam Morcha (Secular) and formally joined NDA in January 2026.
