= Bedrampalla =

- village
- Location in Kerala, India
- Coordinates: 12.6469°N 75.0779°E
- Country: India
- State: Kerala
- District: Kasaragod

Languages
  - Official: Malayalam, English
- Time zone: UTC+5:30 (IST)
- PIN: 671552
- Telephone code: 04998
- Vehicle registration: KL-14
- Nearest city: Perla

Bedrampalla is a small town in Enmakaje Panchayat, Kerala, India. Bedrampalla is located on Seethangoli-Puthige-Perla road of about 4 km (2.5 mi) from Perla Town.

== Etymology ==
The name Bedrampalla is derived from Palla means river or pond located in Bedrampalla.

== Transportation ==
Local roads have access to National Highway No.66 which connects to Mangalore in the north and Calicut in the south. The nearest railway station is Kumbla, KMQ on Mangalore-Palakkad line. There is an airport at Mangalore.

== Languages ==
This locality is an essentially multi-lingual region. The people speak Malayalam, Kannada, Tulu, and Konkani. Migrant workers also speak Hindi and Tamil languages. This village is part of Manjeswaram assembly constituency which is again part of Kasaragod (Lok Sabha constituency)
