= A. K. M. Ashraf =

Legislator

Member of the Kerala Legislative Assembly
- Incumbent
- Assumed office 6 May 2021
- Preceded by: M. C. Kamaruddin
- Constituency: Manjeshwar

Personal details
- Born: 2 January 1978 (age 48) Kadambar-Manjeshwar
- Party: Indian Union Muslim League
- Children: A K shamil
- Education: Bachelor of Arts - / BBA from Kannur University

A.K.M. Ashraf is an Indian Union Muslim League politician from Kerala. He represents Manjeshwar (State Assembly constituency) in 15th Kerala State Legislative Assembly. He is a graduate in Kannada from Kannur University.

== Political career ==
A. K. M. Ashraf had been Manjeshwar block panchayat member in December 2015.

=== 2021 Assembly Election ===
Kerala Legislative Assembly Election, 2021: Manjeshwar
Party	Candidate	Votes	%	±%
IUML	A. K. M. Ashraf	65,758	38.14%	▼2.05
BJP	K. Surendran	65,013	37.7%	▲2.38
CPI(M)	V. V. Rameshan	40,639	23.57%	▲0.38
Anna DHRM	Praveen Kumar S	251	0.15%	
Independent	John D'Souza I	181	0.1%	
Independent	Surendran M	197	0.11%	
NOTA	None of the above	387	0.22%	▼0.13
Majority		745		
Turnout				
Registered electors				
IUML hold		Swing		
