= K. Surendran (politician) =

Indian politician from Kerala

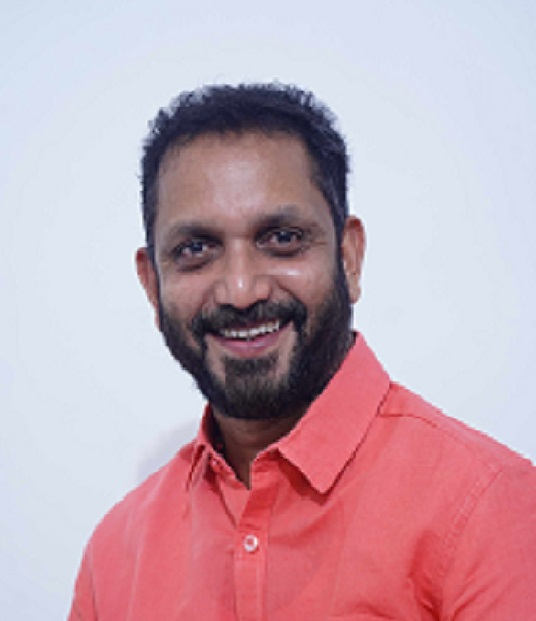

President, Bharatiya Janata Party, Kerala
- In office 2 February 2020 – 23 March 2025
- Preceded by: P. S. Sreedharan Pillai
- Succeeded by: Rajeev Chandrasekhar

Personal details
- Born: 10 March 1970 (age 56) Ulliyeri Kozhikode, Kerala, India
- Party: Bharatiya Janata Party
- Children: 2
- Education: University of Calicut
- Occupation: Politician
- Website: ksurendran.in

Kunnummal Surendran (born 10 March 1970) is an Indian politician from the state of Kerala. He served as the 11th President of the Bharatiya Janata Party in the state.

== Early life ==
K. Surendran was born to Kunjiraman and Kalyani Amma, into a Thiyyar family, the largest Hindu community in Kerala, on 10 March 1970 in Ulliyeri Kozhikode district in Kerala, India. He earned a B.Sc. Chemistry from Zamorin's Guruvayurappan College, Kozhikode.

He started his political career through Akhila Bharatiya Vidyarthi Parishad, the student wing of the RSS. During the earlier years of his political career, he held various positions such as Director North Malabar District Co-operative Marketing Society, President, Desa Seva Samskarika Kendram, Founder Director Board member National Yuva Co-operative Society and advisory board member Nehru Yuva Kendra.

He had moved to Kasaragod many years ago, and learnt Tulu and Kannada languages to better communicate with the local people.

== Political career ==
As Bharatiya Janata Yuva Morcha state president K. Surendran led a march in October 2009 protesting unemployment and a ban on government hiring. Several people were injured when police forcibly prevented the marchers from entering the Secretariat of Kerala. In the 2019 parliamentary contest in Kerala, Surendran was selected by the Bharatiya Janata Party as their candidate in the Pathanamthitta constituency. The constituency was won by Anto Antony of Indian National Congress. Surendran came third behind INC and CPI(M).

Surendran was appointed the state president of Bharatiya Janata Party on February 15, 2020.

== Election attempts ==
- On 16 April 2009 K. Surendran was a Lok Sabha candidate for Kasaragod in the national elections. But he lost.
- In the 2011 state elections for the Manjeshwar constituency P. B. Abdul Razak of the Indian Union Muslim League won 37.46% of the votes and K. Surendran of the BJP came second with 33.8% of the votes. P. B. Abdul Razak was elected with a margin of 5,828 votes.
- In February 2014 it was reported that senior BJP members in Kerala were opposed to the decision that K.Surendran should again be the BJP's Lok Sabha candidate for the Kasaragod constituency. His candidacy was apparently announced in Kasaragod by the former national president Venkaiah Naidu before being reviewed by the election committee, drawing criticism from Shobha Surendran of the national executive and from state president V. Muraleedharan.Surendran was lost in Kasargod.
- In May 2016 Surendran was defeated by a small margin in an election for the Manjeshwar seat. He lost by 89 votes to P. B. Abdul Razak of the Indian Union Muslim League. It was reported that Surendran had been handicapped by resistance to his mode of operation from older party leaders. In July 2016 Surendran asked the Kerala High Court to cancel the Manjeswaram election due to malpractices.
- In 2019, he lost the Parliament election from Pathanamthitta constituency. Surendran came third behind the INC and CPI(M).
- In 2021 Assembly elections K Surendran contested from 2 constituencies, Konni and Manjeswaram, where he lost in both constituencies. He was lost to K. U Jenish Kumar in Konni [²] and to A. K. M Ashraf in Manjeswaram [²]
- In the 2024 Lok Sabha Elections, he contested as the BJP candidate from the Wayanad constituency, facing off against Rahul Gandhi, and finished in third place.

Election candidature history
Election	Year	Party	Constituency	Opponent		Result	Margin
Loksabha	2009	BJP	Kasaragod	CPI(M)	P. Karunakaran	Lost	2,60,040
Loksabha	2014	BJP	Kasaragod	CPI(M)	P. Karunakaran	Lost	2,12,138
Loksabha	2019	BJP	Pathanamthitta	INC	Anto Antony	Lost	84,462
Loksabha	2024	BJP	Wayanad	INC	Rahul Gandhi	Lost	5,06,400
Kerala Legislative Assembly	2011	BJP	Manjeshwar	IUML	P. B. Abdul Razak	Lost	5,828
Kerala Legislative Assembly	2016	BJP	Manjeshwar	IUML	P. B. Abdul Razak	Lost	89
Kerala Legislative Assembly	2019 (by-election)	BJP	Konni	CPI(M)	K. U. Jenish Kumar	Lost	14,313
Kerala Legislative Assembly	2021	BJP	Manjeshwar	IUML	A. K. M. Ashraf	Lost	745
Kerala Legislative Assembly	2021	BJP	Konni	CPI(M)	K. U. Jenish Kumar	Lost	29,507
Kerala Legislative Assembly	2026	BJP	Manjeshwar	IUML	A. K. M. Ashraf	Lost	29,252

== Controversies ==
In April 2013, Surendran spoke out against dropping the investigation by the Vigilance and Anti-corruption Bureau into the transfer of Kovalam Halcyon Castle and land from India Tourism Development Corporation, speaking of conspiracy and corruption behind the proposal.

In May 2017, Surendran posted on Facebook, an old graphic photo of slaughtered cows lying by the sidewalk of a market place in North India and connected it with the beef fests organised in Kerala, as a protest against central government's ban on the sale of cattle for slaughter.

K. Surendran's travel from his home in Kozhikode to Thiruvananthapuram during the COVID-19 pandemic, in which everyone was advised to not travel without any mandatory reasons, has triggered a controversy in Kerala.

Delhi Metro Rail Corporation principal adviser E. Sreedharan as the party's Chief Minister candidate for the Assembly elections, Bharatiya Janata Party State president K. Surendran backtracked on his statement.

He was involved in an alleged hawala case after the May 2021 assembly elections in Kerala and the top leadership of BJP appointed a three-member "independent" panel to submit reports on the distribution and use of election funds provided to the party in Kerala.

== Cultural issues ==
In November 2014, Surendran dismissed the Kiss of Love protest as "a mere transgender protest". He said the media should have paid less attention, since the only aim of the protest was to create social chaos and confusion.

In October 2015, a photograph of K. Surendran eating a meal was published on Facebook, captioned "Kerala BJP leader eating beef". When the photo went viral, Surendran responded that it was only an onion curry, and said that in an election period he was strictly vegetarian. Later he said he had never eaten beef in his life. He also said it was untrue that beef exports had risen by 15.4% in India during the first year of the BJP government led by Narendra Modi. That month, Sobha Surendran, a member of the national executive, said the BJP did not oppose selling or eating beef in Kerala, but did object to beef festivals being organised in educational institutions.

In May 2016, Surendran asked why some members of Pinarayi Vijayan's cabinet were avoiding use of state-provided vehicles that had the number 13, apparently for superstitious reasons.

== Sabarimala protests ==
K Surendran was a leading figure of Sabarimala protests. He was charged with 242 police cases and was arrested from Nilakkal on Sabarimala after which he was imprisoned for 21 days. Surendran alleged that the Kerala police desecrated his irumudikettu (bag of holy offerings carried by Sabarimala devotees) and manhandled him. He also said that the police mistreated him while in the custody and did not give him water and food. However, Devaswom Minister Kadakampally Surendran refuted these allegations. He then provided a video footage of the incident through his social media. The footage shows the Mudikkettu falling down from Surendran's shoulder after which the Superintendent of Police picks it up and gives back to him while he throws it back to the ground. "He was treated as a VIP in the station and was given a cushioned chair to sit. He used his insulin, he was given water and food. There is CCTV footage of him eating. CCTV footage will not lie, will it?"; the police replied to the other allegations made by Surendran of denying him food and medicine. Kadakampally also accused Surendran of breaking the Hindu traditions by visiting Sabarimala, within a few months of his mother's death.
