= Manjeshwaram Assembly constituency =

Constituency of the Kerala legislative assembly in India

Manjeshwaram
- Constituency No. 1 for the Kerala Legislative Assembly
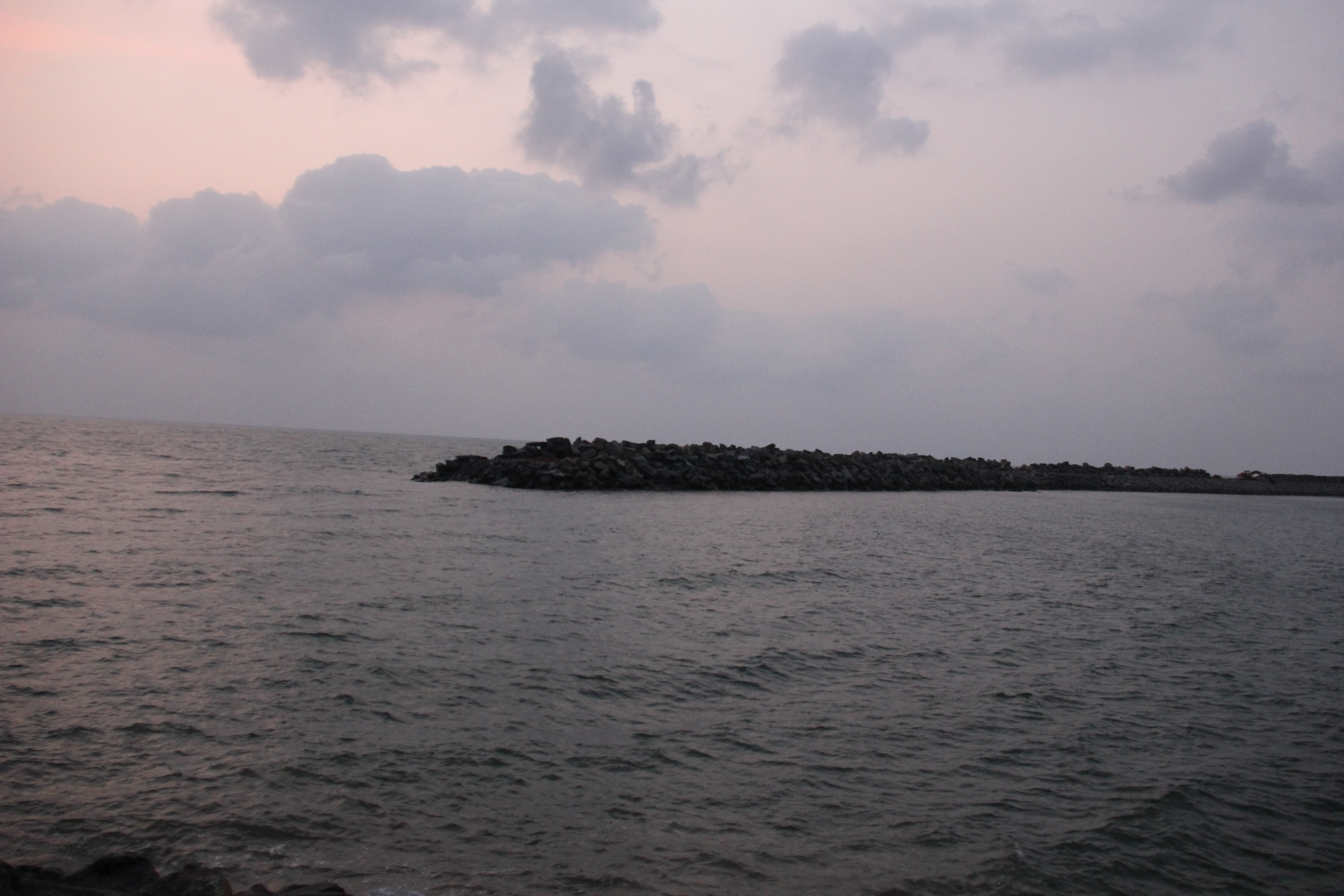
- Manjeshwara Harbour is situated in Manjeshwara Assembly constituency.

Constituency details
- Country: India
- Region: South India
- State: Kerala
- District: Kasaragod
- Lok Sabha constituency: Kasaragod
- Established: 1957
- Total electors: 2,27,403 (2026)
- Reservation: None

Member of Legislative Assembly
- 16th Kerala Legislative Assembly
- Incumbent A. K. M. Ashraf
- Party: IUML
- Alliance: United Democratic Front
- Elected year: 2026

Manjeshwaram State assembly constituency is one of the 140 state legislative assembly constituencies in Kerala in southern India. It is also one of the seven state legislative assembly constituencies included in Kasaragod Lok Sabha constituency. As of the 2026 Assembly elections, the current MLA is A. K. M. Ashraf of IUML.

== Local self-governed segments ==
Manjeshwaram Assembly constituency is composed of the following local self-governed segments:

Manjeshwar Assembly constituency

Sl no.	Name	Status (Grama panchayat/Municipality)	Taluk
1	Enmakaje	Grama panchayat	Manjeshwaram
2	Kumbla	Grama panchayat	Manjeshwaram
3	Mangalpady	Grama panchayat	Manjeshwaram
4	Manjeshwar	Grama panchayat	Manjeshwaram
5	Meenja	Grama panchayat	Manjeshwaram
6	Paivalike	Grama panchayat	Manjeshwaram
7	Puthige	Grama panchayat	Manjeshwaram
8	Vorkady	Grama panchayat	Manjeshwaram

== Members of Legislative Assembly ==
The following list contains all members of Kerala Legislative Assembly who have represented Manjeshwar Assembly constituency during the period of various assemblies:

Election	Name	Party
1957	M Umesh Rao	Independent
1960	K Mahabala Bhandary	Independent
1965	K Mahabala Bhandary	Indian National Congress
1967	K Mahabala Bhandary	Independent
1970	M. Ramappa	Communist Party of India
1977	M. Ramappa	Communist Party of India
1980	A. Subba Rao	Communist Party of India
1982	A. Subba Rao	Communist Party of India
1987	Cherkalam Abdullah	Indian Union Muslim League
1991	Cherkalam Abdullah	Indian Union Muslim League
1996	Cherkalam Abdullah	Indian Union Muslim League
2001	Cherkalam Abdullah	Indian Union Muslim League
2006	C. H. Kunhambu	Communist Party of India
2011	P. B. Abdul Razak	Indian Union Muslim League
2016	P. B. Abdul Razak	Indian Union Muslim League
2019^	M. C. Kamaruddin	Indian Union Muslim League
2021	A. K. M. Ashraf	Indian Union Muslim League
2026	A. K. M. Ashraf	Indian Union Muslim League

^by-election

== Election results ==
Percentage change (±%) denotes the change in the number of votes from the immediately previous election.

=== 2026 ===
There were 2,27,403 registered voters in the assembly in 2026 election.

2026 Kerala Legislative Assembly election: Manjeshwaram
Party	Candidate	Votes	%	±%
IUML	A. K. M. Ashraf	96,948	51.62%	▲13.48
BJP	K. Surendran	67,696	36.05%	▼1.65
CPI(M)	K. R. Jayananda	21,212	11.29%	▼12.28
BSP	Sanjeeva	212	0.11%	New
Independent	Kannur Abdulla Master	285	0.15%	New
Independent	Gean Lavina Monterio	523	0.28%	New
Independent	John D' Souza I	46	0.02%	New
Independent	Mohammad Ashraf	78	0.04%	New
Independent	Mohammed Ashraf K A	64	0.03%	New
Independent	Abdul Latheef I	79	0.04%	New
NOTA	None of the above	455	0.24%	0.02
Margin of victory		29,252	15.59%	▲15.15
Turnout		1,87,598	73.5%	▼3.38
IUML hold		Swing	▲15.15	

By local self-governed segment:

Status (Gram panchayat)	Votes		
Status (Gram panchayat)	UDF	NDA	LDF
Manjeshwaram	16,261	8,787	2,453
Vorkady	8,586	5,876	1,988
Meenja	7,823	7,713	1,884
Mangalpady	22,625	9,849	2,357
Paivalike	9,592	9,754	2,897
Kumbala	19,197	10,288	3,561
Puthige	6,611	5,144	3,374
Enmakaje	5,775	9,654	2,508
Postal Ballots	478	631	190

=== 2021 ===
There were 221,682 registered voters in the constituency for the 2021 Kerala Assembly election.

Kerala Legislative Assembly Election, 2021: Manjeshwaram
Party	Candidate	Votes	%	±%
IUML	A. K. M. Ashraf	65,858	38.14%	▼2.05
BJP	K. Surendran	65,013	37.70%	▲2.38
CPI(M)	V. V. Rameshan	40,639	23.57%	▲0.38
Anna DHRM	Praveen Kumar S	251	0.15%	
Independent	John D'Souza I	181	0.1%	
Independent	Surendran M	197	0.11%	
NOTA	None of the above	387	0.22%	▼0.13
Majority		845	0.44%	
Turnout		1,70,431	76.88%	▲1.1
IUML hold		Swing	▼2.05	

By local self-governed segment:

Status (Gram panchayat)	Votes		
Status (Gram panchayat)	UDF	NDA	LDF
Manjeshwaram	11,854	9,037	4,676
Vorkady	5,090	5,869	4,565
Meenja	5,267	7,324	3,639
Mangalpady	15,384	9,583	6,309
Paivalike	6,405	9,227	5,366
Kumbala	12,844	9,556	6,439
Puthige	3,893	4,635	4,591
Enmakaje	4,453	8,769	4,071
Postal Ballots	568	1,013	541

=== 2019 by-election ===
Due to the death of sitting MLA P. B. Abdul Razak, a by-election was held on 21 October 2019.

There were 2,14,779 registered voters in Manjeshwaram Assembly constituency for this by-election. M. C. Kamaruddin won the election by 7,923 votes.

2019 Kerala Legislative Assembly by-elections: Manjeshwaram
Party	Candidate	Votes	%	±%
IUML	M. C. Kamaruddin	65,407	40.19%	▲4.40
BJP	Raveesh Thanthri Kuntar	57,484	35.32%	▼0.42
CPI(M)	M. Shankara Rai	38,233	23.49%	▼3.30
NOTA	None of the above	574	0.35%	▼0.06
Independent	Govindan B. Alinthazhe	337	0.21%	N/A
Independent	John D. Souza	277	0.17%	▲0.04
Independent	Rajesh B.	232	0.14%	N/A
Independent	Kamarudheen M. C.	211	0.13%	N/A
Margin of victory		7,923	4.87%	▲4.82
Turnout		1,62,755	75.78%	▼0.55
IUML hold		Swing	▲4.40	

=== 2016 ===
There were 2,08,165 registered voters in Manjeshwaram Assembly constiteuncy for the 2016 Kerala Assembly election.

2016 Kerala Legislative Assembly election: Manjeshwaram
Party	Candidate	Votes	%	±%
IUML	P. B. Abdul Razak	56,870	35.79%	▼1.67
BJP	K. Surendran	56,781	35.74%	▲2.66
CPI(M)	C. H. Kunhambu	42,565	26.79%	▲0.42
PDP	Basheer Ahammad S. M.	759	0.48%	−
NOTA	None of the above	646	0.41%	−
Independent	Sundara K.	467	0.29%	−
BSP	Ravichandra	365	0.23%	▼0.23
Independent	K. P. Muneer	224	0.14%	
Independent	John D. Souza	207	0.13%	
Margin of victory		89	0.05	▼4.33
Turnout		1,58,884	76.33%	▲1.13
IUML hold		Swing	▼1.67	

=== 2011 ===
There were 176,817 registered voters in the constituency for the 2011 election.

2011 Kerala Legislative Assembly election: Manjeshwaram
Party	Candidate	Votes	%	±%
IUML	P. B. Abdul Razak	49,817	37.46	▲6.35
BJP	K. Surendran	43,989	33.08	▲1.76
CPI(M)	C. H. Kunhambu	35,067	26.37	▼9.34
Independent	Hafsa Muneer	1,076	0.81	
BSP	Abdul Majeed	869	0.65	▼1.20
Independent	Abdulla Timber	547	0.41	
Independent	Kunhambu	490	0.37	
Independent	Abdul Razzak K,	465	0.35	
Independent	Abbas M.	391	0.29	
Independent	Abdulla P. M.	262	0.20	
Margin of victory		5,828	4.38	▼0.01
Turnout		1,32,973	75.20	
IUML gain from CPI(M)		Swing	▲6.35	

=== 2006 ===
There were 154,288 registered voters in the constituency for the 2006 election.

2006 Kerala Legislative Assembly election: Manjeshwaram
Party	Candidate	Votes	%	±%
CPI(M)	C. H. Kunhambu	39,242	35.71	
BJP	Narayana Bhat	34,413	31.32	
IUML	Cherkalam Abdullah	34,186	31.11	
BSP	Madhave Manjeshway	2,037	1.85	
Margin of victory		4,829	4.39	
Turnout		1,32,973	75.20	
CPI(M) hold		Swing		

== See also ==
- Manjeshwaram
- Kasaragod district
- List of constituencies of the Kerala Legislative Assembly
- 2016 Kerala Legislative Assembly election
- 2019 Kerala Legislative Assembly by-elections
