= A. Subba Rao =

A. Subba Rao may refer to:

- Adurthi Subba Rao, Indian film director, cinematographer and screenwriter
- A. Subba Rao (politician), Indian politician
