= Nadubail =

- Village
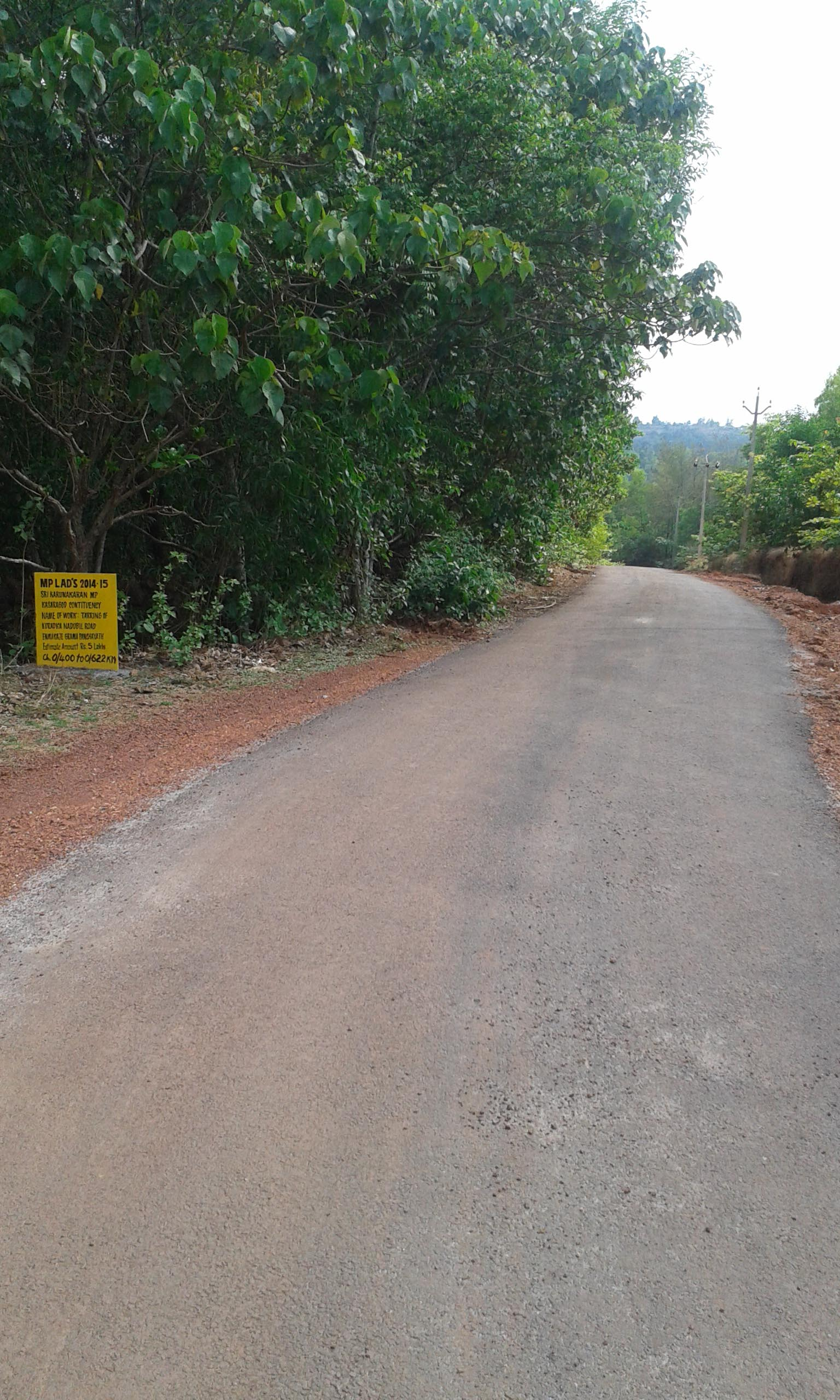
- Nadubail

- Location in Kerala, India
- Coordinates: 12.76°N 75.03°E
- Country: India
- State: Kerala
- District: Kasaragod

Population
  - Total: 350

Languages
  - Official: Malayalam, English
- Time zone: UTC+5:30 (IST)
- PIN: 671552 Perla
- Telephone code: 04998
- ISO 3166 code: IND
- Vehicle registration: KL14
- Nearest city: Perla

Nadubail is a small village in Enmakaje Panchayat, Kasaragod District of Kerala, India. It belongs to North Kerala Division. It is located three kilometers away from Panchayat's headquarters.

Nadubail has no post office; instead, it is part of the postal head of Perla. Perla, Badiadka, Mulleria, Vittal, and Puttur are the nearby towns. It is near the Karnataka State border at Saradka.

== Transportation ==
Local roads have access to National Highway No.66 which connects to Mangalore in the north and Calicut in the south. The nearest railway station is Manjeshwaram on the Mangalore-Palakkad line. There is an airport at Mangalore.

== Languages ==
This locality is an essentially multilingual region. The people speak Malayalam, Tulu, Beary Bashe, and Konkani. Migrant workers also speak Hindi and Tamil.

== Administration ==
Nadubali is part of the Manjeswaram assembly constituency, which is part of Kasaragod (Lok Sabha constituency)
