= P. B. Abdul Razak =

Indian politician

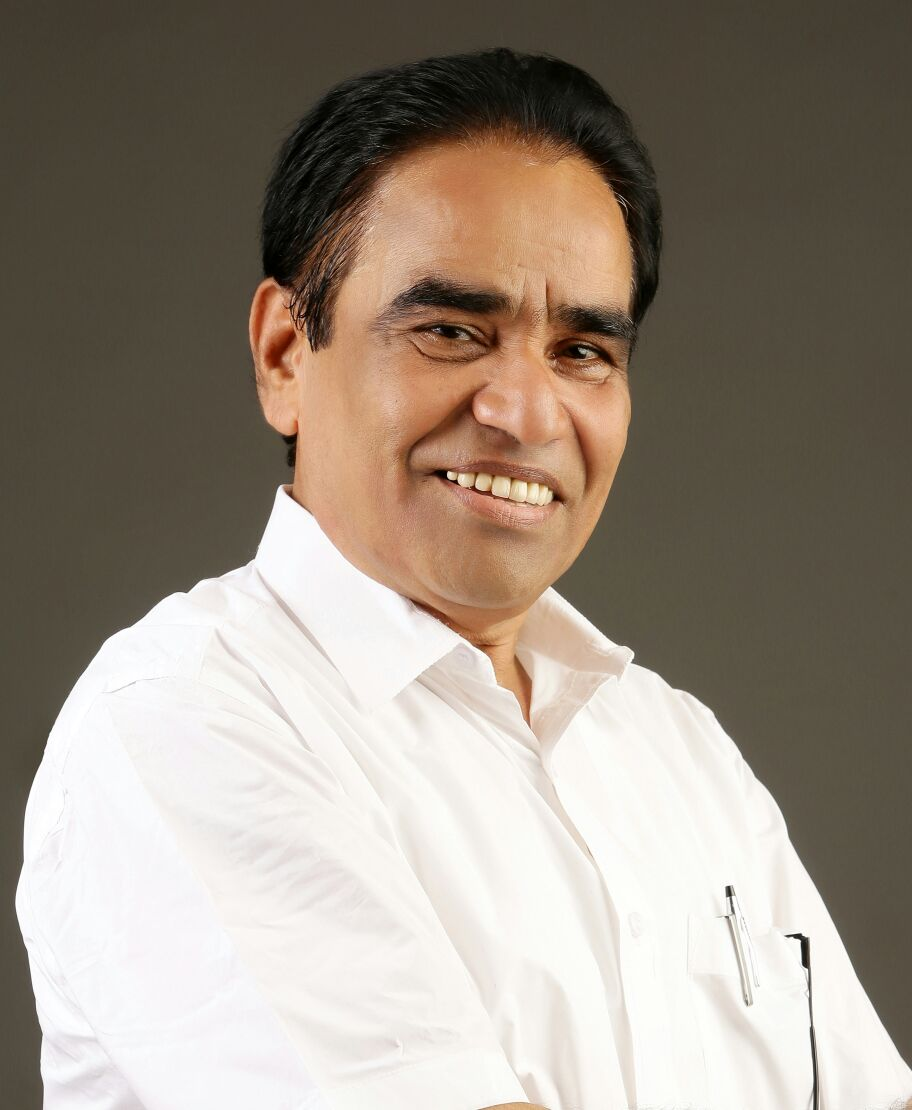

Member of Kerala Legislative Assembly
- In office 1 June 2011 – 20 October 2018
- Preceded by: C. H. Kunhambu
- Succeeded by: M. C. Kamaruddin
- Constituency: Manjeshwar

Personal details
- Born: 1 October 1955
- Died: 20 October 2018 (aged 63) Kasaragod, Kerala, India
- Party: Indian Union Muslim League
- Spouse: Smt. Safiya Abdul Razak

P. B. Abdul Razak (1 October 1955 – 20 October 2018) was a Member of the Kerala Legislative Assembly from Manjeshwar constituency from 2011-2018.

Razak was a businessman and was first elected in 2011 defeating K Surendran of the Bharatiya Janata Party by 5,828 votes. He was re-elected in 2016 defeating K Surendran of the Bharatiya Janata Party again by 89 votes. He died in 2018 of a heart attack.
