= Cherkalam Abdullah =

Indian politician

Minister of Local administration, Government of Kerala
- In office 26 May 2001-29 August 2004
- Preceded by: Paloli Muhammad kutty
- Succeeded by: Kutty Ahammed Kutty
- Constituency: Manjeshwar Assembly constituency

Member of the Kerala Legislative Assembly
- In office 1987–2006
- Preceded by: K. P. Kunhikannan
- Succeeded by: C. H. Kunhambu

Personal details
- Born: September 15, 1942 Cherkalam, Kasaragod district, Kerala, India
- Died: July 27, 2018 (aged 75) Kasaragod district, Kerala, India
- Party: Indian Union Muslim League
- Spouse: Ayesha Cherkalam
- Children: 4

Cherkalam Abdullah (15 September 1942 – 27 July 2018) was an Indian politician associated with the Indian Union Muslim League. He served as a member of the Kerala Legislative Assembly from the Manjeshwar Assembly constituency from 1987 to 2006. He was elected in four consecutive terms—in 1987, 1991, 1996, and 2001.

Abdullah served as the Minister for Local Self-Governments in the United Democratic Front (UDF) government led by A. K. Antony from 2001 to 2004. He was known for his efforts in streamlining Kudumbashree-initiated projects during his tenure.

== Early life ==
Abdullah was born on 15 September 1942 in Cherkalam, Kerala, to Barikad Muhammed Haji and Asyamma.

== Personal life ==
Abdullah was married to Ayesha Cherkalam. The couple had four children—two sons and two daughters. His family has been actively involved in politics.
