= M. C. Kamaruddin =

Legislator

M. C. Kamaruddin MLA
- എം സി ഖമറുദ്ദീന്‍ ಎಂಸಿ ಖಮರುದ್ದೀನ್

Member of the Kerala Legislative Assembly for Manjeshwaram
- In office 28 October 2019 – 3 May 2021
- Preceded by: P. B. Abdul Razak
- Succeeded by: A. K. M. Ashraf

Personal details
- Party: Indian Union Muslim League

M. C. Kamaruddin is an Indian politician belonging to Indian Union Muslim League. He was elected as a member of Kerala Legislative Assembly from Manjeshwaram on 24 October 2019.

== Political career ==
Due to the death of sitting MLA P. B. Abdul Razak, Manjeshwaram went to bypoll on 21 October 2019. There were 214,779 registered voters in Manjeshwaram Constituency for this by-election. M. C. Kamaruddin won the election by 7923 votes in the election.

== Controversies ==
=== Financial scam ===
Over 100 complaints have been registered against MC Kamaruddin in various police stations on a financial scam worth Rs 1.30 billion. He along with IUML district-level leader TK Pookoya Thangal instituted a company named Fashion Gold in Kasaragod in 2017 with 700 investors. The company was closed in September 2019 and investors failed to get the promised dividends. M. C. Kamaruddin was the chairman and Muslim League district working committee member TK Pookoya Thanagal was the managing director of the company. The case is currently investigated by the crime branch crime investigation department (CBCID), Kerala Police. The Enforcement Directorate (ED) has also registered case against him for money laundering. Since involvement in financial scam is a violation of the code of conduct for legislators, the Committee on Privileges and Ethics of Kerala Legislative Assembly initiated enquiry on the matter.

Following the scam he was removed from the chairmanship of United Democratic Front (UDF) in Kasaragod. He also resigned from the post of Indian Union Muslim League's district secretary at Kasaragod.

M.C. Kamaruddin and A.G.C. Basheer, the Kasaragod District panchayat president were caught in a scam where they collected ₹500,000 each from 85 people by promising required permissions for Trikaripur Arts and Science College. The college till date have no affiliation with Kannur University.

MC Kamaruddin, a Muslim League leader, and Fashion Gold Chairman Pookoya Thangal were arrested by the Enforcement Directorate in connection with the Fashion Gold investment scam. Both were taken into two-day custody for detailed questioning. The ED launched the probe based on 168 cases registered by Kerala Police in Kasaragod and Kannur. The investigation found that Fashion Gold was not authorized to collect public investments.
