= Perla, Kasaragod =

Perla
- Town
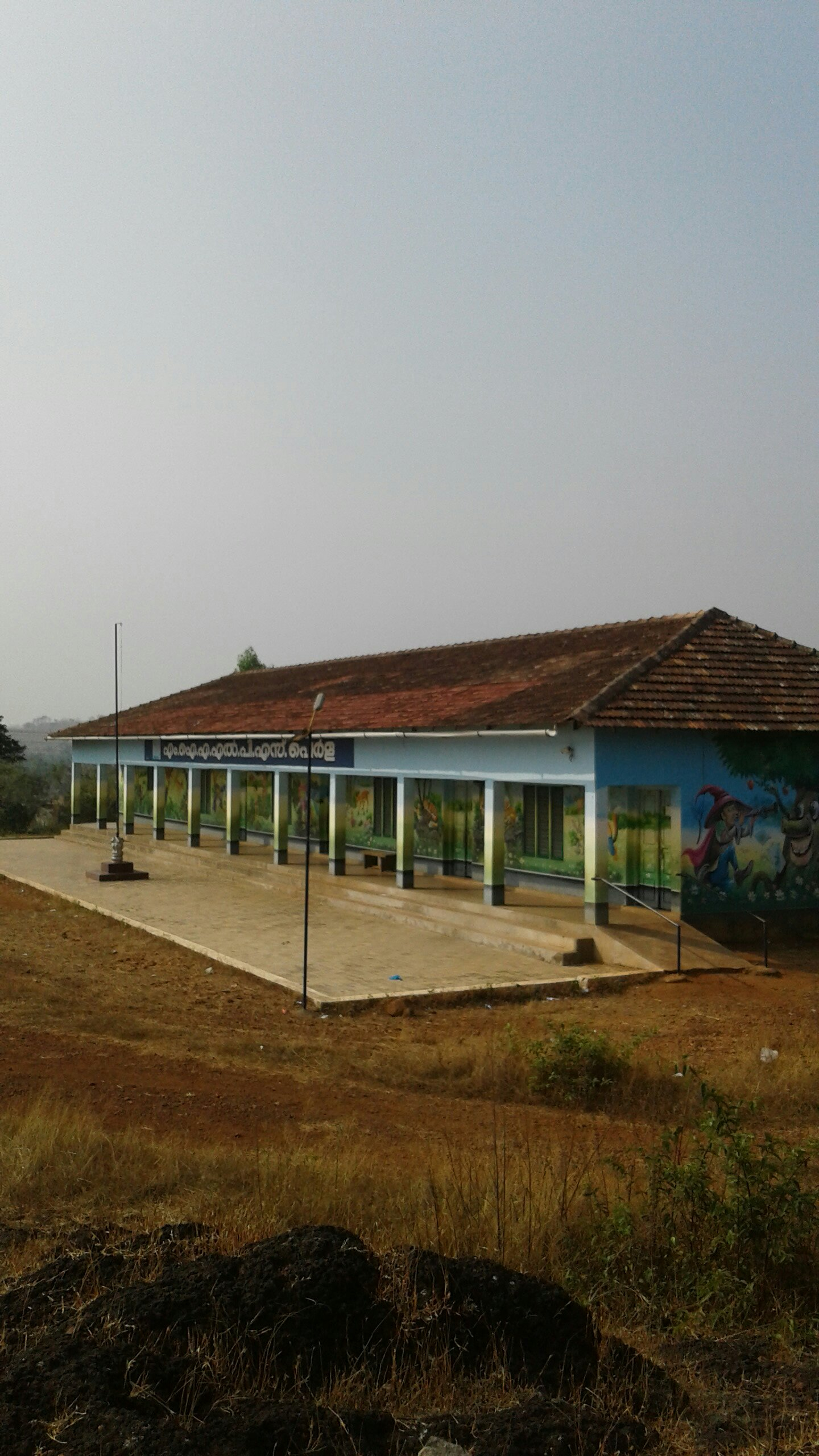
- MIALP School

- Location in Kerala, India Perla (India)
- Coordinates: 12.6426°N 75.1049°E
- Country: India
- State: Kerala
- District: Kasaragod
- Taluk: Manjeshwaram
- Elevation: 182 m (597 ft)

Population (2011)
  - Total: 13,230

Languages
  - Official: Malayalam, Tulu, Kannada, English
- Time zone: UTC+5:30 (IST)
- PIN: 671552
- Telephone code: 04998
- Vehicle registration: KL-14
- Nearest city: Mangalore
- Lok Sabha constituency: Kasaragod
- Vidhan Sabha constituency: Manjeshwaram
- Climate: Tropical monsoon (Köppen-Geiger)
- Avg. summer temperature: 29.5 °C (85.1 °F)

Perla is an administrative capital of Enmakaje Panchayat, which is in Kasaragod district, Kerala, India.

State Highway 31 passes into the Perla Town, which connects Kalladka and Cherkala. It is easy to reach Mangalore via Vittal.

It is easy to reach towns like Vittal, Puthur, Uppala, Kumbla, Badiyadka, Mulleria

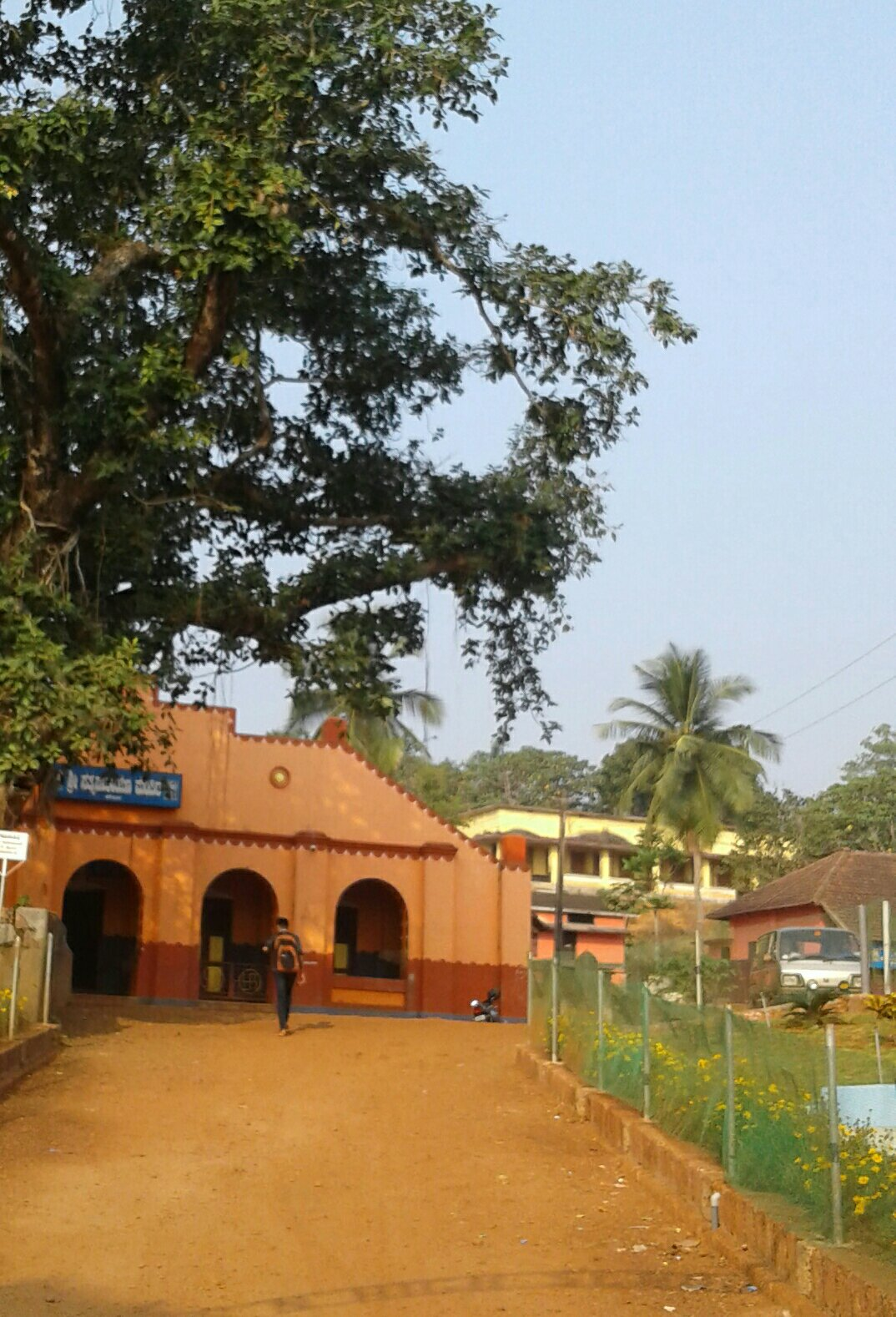
S.N.Highschool

== Geography ==
Perla is Panchayat headquarter of Enmakaje Panchayat. Perla town belongs to Enmakaje Panchayat. It is located in State Highway 31 connecting to Karnataka State Border.

The geographical coordinates of Perla are :12° 578' 0" North, 74° 98' 0" East.

== Demographics ==
As of 2011 census, Perla (Enmakaje village) had a population of 13,230 with, 6,606 males and 6,624 females. The population of children in the age group of 0-6 is 1,348 (10.2% of total population). Perla had average literacy of 88% lower than state average of 94%. Male literacy stands at 92.9% and Female literacy at 83.2%.

People in Perla speak many languages including Malayalam, Tulu.

== Climate ==
Perla has a tropical climate. In most months of the year, there is significant rainfall in Perla. There is only a short dry season and it is not very effective. The Köppen-Geiger climate classification is Am. The average annual temperature in Perla is 25.1 °C. About 3820 mm of precipitation falls annually.

== Economy ==
Arecanut is the chief agricultural product from this place. Other crops, are: Coconut, Rubber, Cashew and Cocoa. Beedi making (various brands) is the occupation of many families here. The Koraga tribal community living in Perla has its own colony. Beedi working is one of the source of Income for them.

== Sports ==
Cricket and football are given major importance in Perla. Other major sports like volleyball, kabaddi, and badminton are also practiced in Perla.

Perla has some major sports clubs like Binny arts&sports club, sunny perla emirates sportings.

Perla school ground is one of the famous grounds in perla also bedrampalla ground is located about 4 km from town. It is horizontal, green and look like a stadium. Cricket and football tournaments are mainly held on SNHS ground Panchayath mini stadium is another most popular venue in Perla. Cricket and football are mainly practiced here.

== Transportation ==
Perla is well connected to Kasaragod, Badiyadka, Kumbla, Uppala, in Kerala state and Puttur, Vittal, Mangalore in Karnataka state. Local roads have access to National Highway No.66 which connects to Mangalore in the north and Calicut in the south. The nearest railway station is Kumbla on Shoranur-Mangalore section of Southern railway. The nearest airport is at Mangalore.

== Languages ==
This locality is an essentially multi-lingual region. The people speak Malayalam, Tulu, Marathi, Beary, Konkani. Migrant workers also speak Hindi language.

== Administration ==
This village is part of Manjeswaram assembly constituency which is again part of Kasaragod (Lok Sabha constituency)

== Educational organizations ==
- Kasargod Medical College, Ukkinadka, Perla
- Nalanda College of Arts and Science,
- MALP School kannatikana- Perla
- Sri Sathya Narayana High School
- GHSS, Padre, Perla
- SSHSS, Katukukke, Perla
- SSHSS, Sheni, Perla
- Sri vagdevi primary school nalka

== See also ==
- Kattathadka
- Uppala
- Kasaragod District
- Ananthapura Lake Temple
- Vittal
