= M. Ramappa =

Indian politician

M. Ramappa (8 July 1922 – 25 July 1991) was an Indian politician and leader of Communist Party of India. He represented Manjeshwar constituency in 4th & 5th Kerala Legislative Assembly.
