= 2021 Kerala Legislative Assembly election =

Indian state election

- 6 April 2021

All 140 seats in the Kerala Legislative Assembly 71 seats needed for a majority
- Opinion polls
- Registered: 27,503,768
- Turnout: 76% (▼1.53 pp)
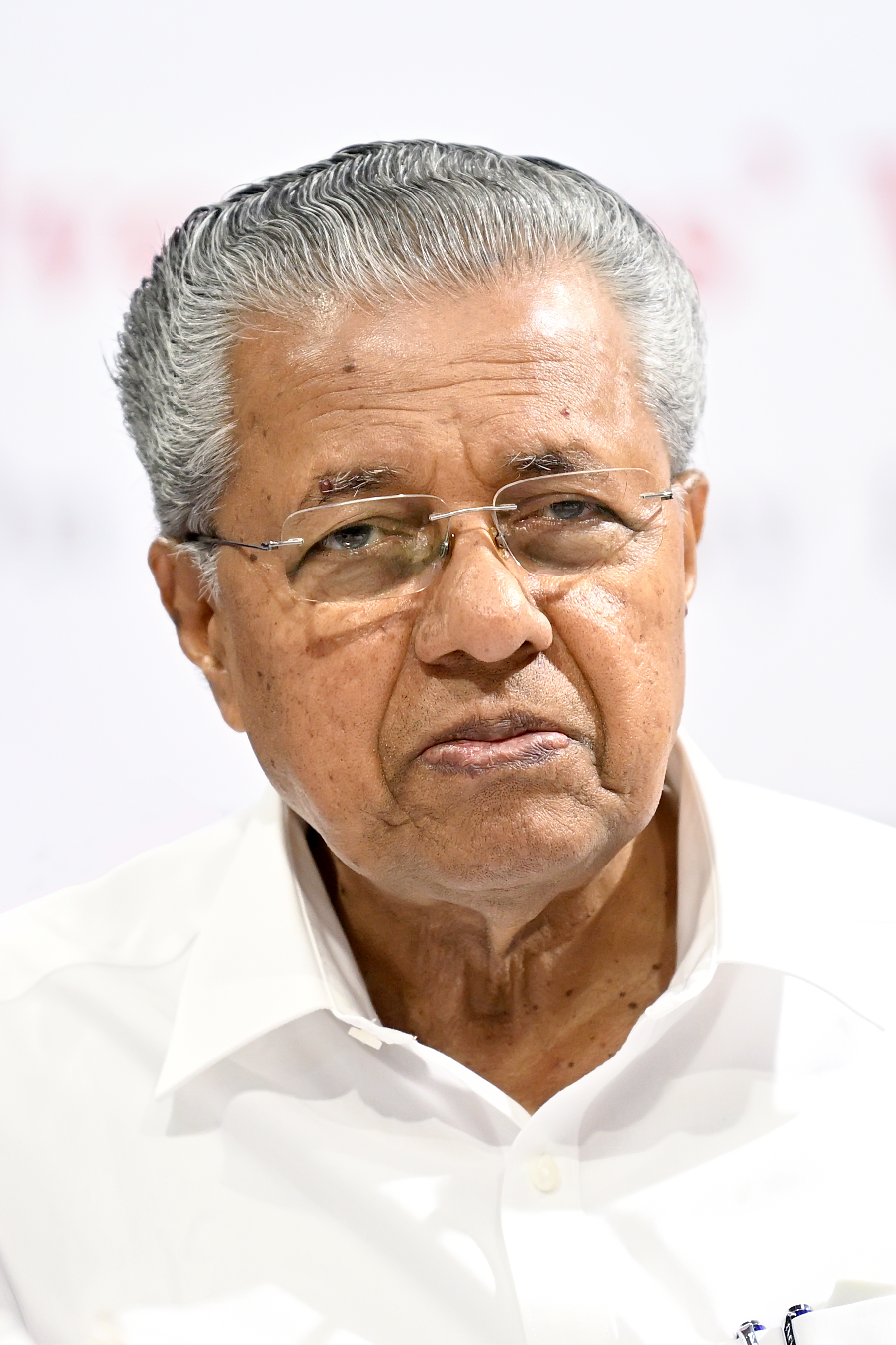

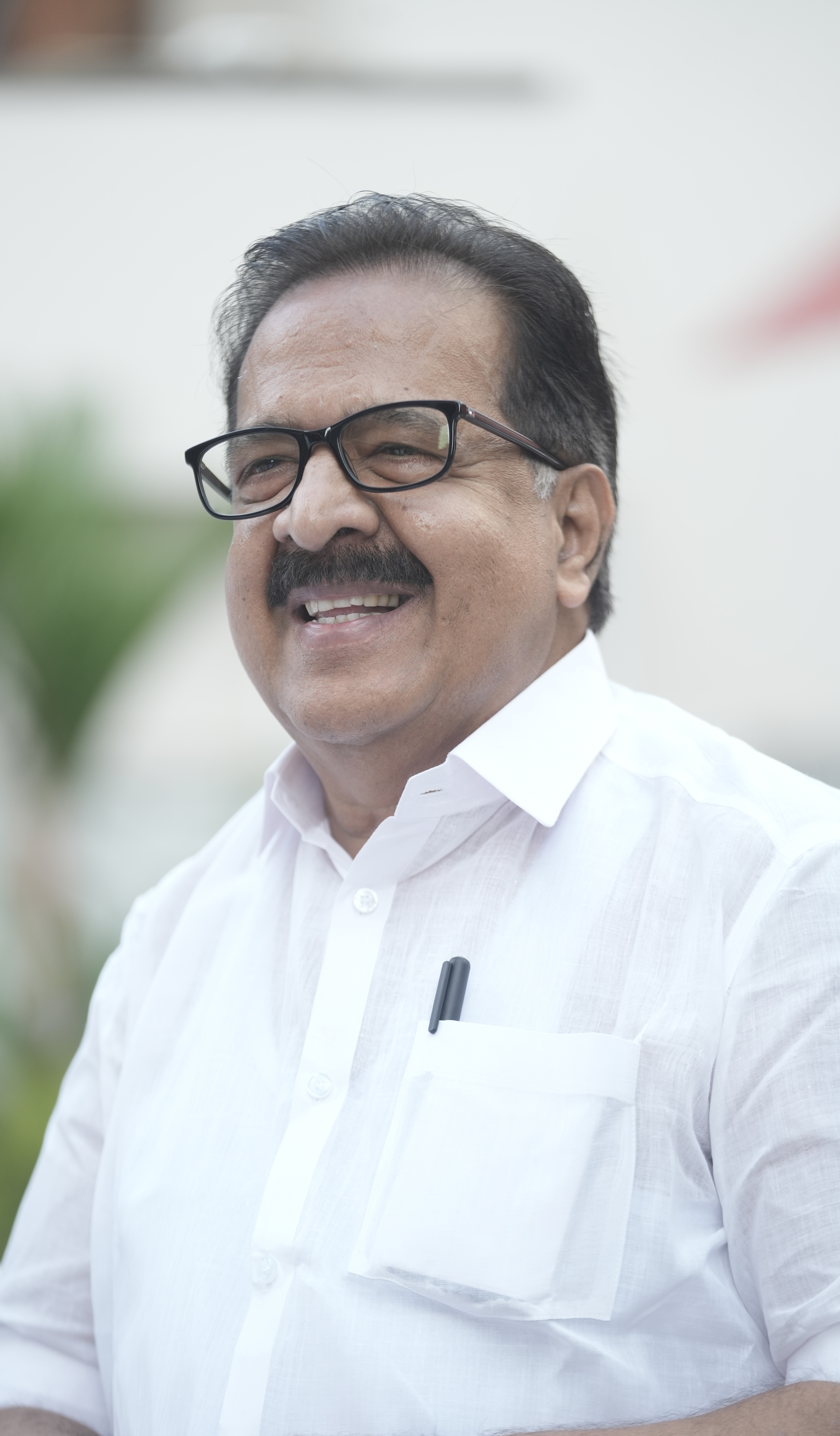

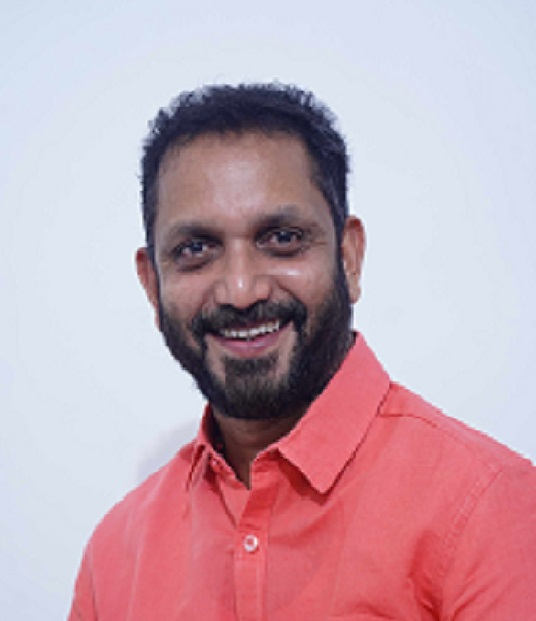
| | Majority party | Minority party | Third party |
|---|---|---|---|
| Leader | Pinarayi Vijayan | Ramesh Chennithala | K. Surendran |
| Party | CPI(M) | INC | BJP |
| Alliance | LDF | UDF | NDA |
| Leader since | 2016 | 2016 | 2020 |
| Leader's seat | Dharmadam | Haripad | Manjeshwaram |
| Last election | 43.48%, 58 seats | 38.81%, 22 seats | 10.53%, 1 seat |
| Seats won | 62 | 22 | 0 |
| Seat change | ▲4 | Steady | ▼1 |
| Popular vote | 5,288,507 | 5,233,429 | 2,357,853 |
| Percentage | 25.38% | 25.12% | 11.3% |
| Alliance seats | 99 | 41 | 0 |
| Alliance seat change | ▲8 | ▼6 | ▼1 |
| Alliance Popular Vote | 10,555,616 | 8,196,813 | 2,357,853 |
| Alliance Vote Share | 45.43% | 39.47% | 11.3% |

- Composition of the Kerala Legislative Assembly after the election
Chief Minister before election
Pinarayi Vijayan
CPI(M)
Elected Chief Minister
Pinarayi Vijayan
CPI(M)

The 2021 Kerala Legislative Assembly election was held in Kerala on 6 April 2021 to elect 140 members to the 15th Kerala Assembly. The results were declared on 2 May.

The election saw the incumbent Left Democratic Front (LDF) in a historic win retaining power with 99 seats, 8 more than in the previous election, marking the first time that an alliance won consecutive terms in the state since 1977. The United Democratic Front (UDF) won the remaining 41 seats, 6 less than in the previous election. The National Democratic Alliance (NDA) received a dip in vote share and lost their lone seat. Pinarayi Vijayan became the first Chief Minister of Kerala to be re-elected after completing a full, five-year term in office.

== Background ==
Kerala has a unicameral house of legislation, Niyamasabha, consisting of 140 members elected from individual constituencies and one nominated member from the Anglo-Indian community. Members are elected for a period of five years, unless the assembly is dissolved earlier. Fourteen and two constituencies respectively are reserved for members belonging to Scheduled Castes (SC) and Scheduled Tribes (ST). The tenure of the members of the 14th Legislative Assembly in the state ended on 1 June 2021.

As with all assembly elections in India, Kerala uses first-past-the-post election system. Voters are given a provision to vote NOTA (None Of The Above). State Election Commission, Kerala conducts the assembly election and is overseen by Election Commission of India.

=== Changes in alliance compositions ===
In the previous election in 2016, the LDF bagged 91 seats in the assembly, defeating the incumbent UDF, led by the Indian National Congress (INC), which could only win 47 seats in the election. The remaining seat was won by an independent, P. C. George, who later formed the party Kerala Janapaksham (Secular).

After being suspended from UDF, Kerala Congress (M), led by Jose K. Mani, joined LDF. However, a faction of the party, led by P. J. Joseph, remained in UDF and formed Kerala Congress.

Another major change that occurred after 2016 was the entry of 4 parties, including Loktantrik Janata Dal and Indian National League, into LDF.

=== 2020 local elections ===
In the 2020 Kerala local elections held in December, LDF performed strong, including a lead in 11 out of 14 district panchayats in the state.

The induction of Kerala Congress (M) gave inroads to LDF in the traditional UDF strongholds of Kottayam district and nearby areas with large number of Syrian Christian voters.

After the local elections, A. Vijayaraghavan, the new state secretary of Communist Party of India (Marxist), repeatedly alleged that UDF had secret alliance with the fundamentalist organisations like Jamaat-e-Islami.

=== 2021 ===
In February 2021, Nationalist Congress Party (NCP) leader Mani C. Kappan, the sitting MLA of Pala constituency, switched to the UDF after the LDF denied his request to contest in Pala constituency in the election. This resulted in his expulsion from NCP, following which he formed a new political party named Nationalist Congress Kerala (NCK).

In March 2021, R. Balasankar, leader of Rashtriya Swayamsevak Sangh from Alappuzha, claimed that the Kerala leadership of BJP had struck a secret deal with CPI(M) to weaken and ensure the defeat of UDF, a claim denied by BJP. On 17 March 2021, P. C. Thomas announced the merger of his party with P. J. Joseph's Kerala Congress, with him being its Deputy Chairman.

== Schedule ==
List of constituencies

| Election event | Date | Day |
|---|---|---|
| Date of issue of gazette notification | 12/03/2021 | Friday |
| Last date for filing nomination | 19/03/2021 | Friday |
| Scrutiny of nomination | 20/03/2021 | Saturday |
| Last date of withdrawal of candidature | 22/03/2021 | Monday |
| Date of polling | 06/04/2021 | Tuesday |
| Date of counting | 02/05/2021 | Sunday |

Final voters list for 2021 Kerala Legislative Assembly election
| Group of voters | Voters population |
|---|---|
| Male | 13,283,724 |
| Female | 14,162,025 |
| Transgender | 290 |
| Total voters | 27,446,039 |

== Parties and alliances ==
The Left Democratic Front (LDF) is a coalition of centre-left to left-wing political parties, led by the Communist Party of India (Marxist) (CPIM). The United Democratic Front (UDF) is an alliance of centrist to centre-left political parties led by the Indian National Congress (INC). The National Democratic Alliance (NDA) led by Bharatiya Janata Party (BJP) is a coalition of centrist to right-wing parties.

=== Left Democratic Front ===
Left Democratic Front

An alliance of centre-left to left-wing political parties, the LDF is currently in power. The coalition consists of CPI(M), CPI, and several smaller parties.

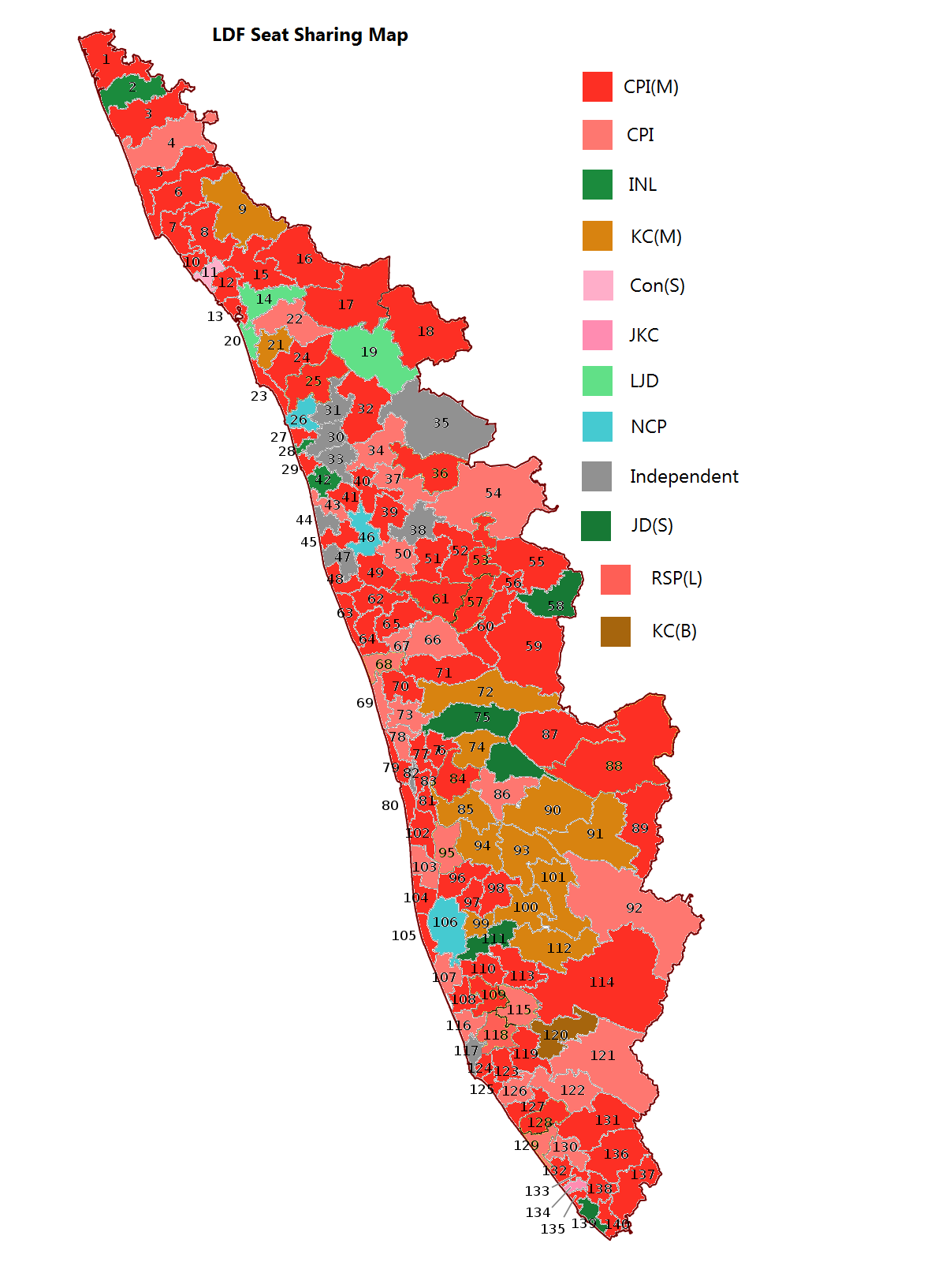
Left Democratic Front seat sharing map

Left Democratic Front
| Party | Flag | Symbol | Leader | Seats Contested |
| Communist Party of India (Marxist) | | | A. Vijayaraghavan | 77 |
| Communist Party of India | | | Kanam Rajendran | 23 |
| Kerala Congress (Mani) | | | Jose K. Mani | 12 |
| Janata Dal (Secular) | | | Mathew T. Thomas | 4 |
| Nationalist Congress Party | | | T. P. Peethambaran | 3 |
| Loktantrik Janata Dal | | | M. V. Shreyams Kumar | 3 |
| Indian National League | | | A. P. Abdul Wahab | 3 |
| Congress (Secular) | | | Kadannappalli Ramachandran | 1 |
| Kerala Congress (B) | | | R. Balakrishna Pillai | 1 |
| Janadhipathya Kerala Congress | | | K. C. Joseph | 1 |
| Independent politician | | | | 12 |
| Total | | | | 140 |

=== United Democratic Front (Kerala) ===
United Democratic Front (Kerala)

It is an alliance of centrist to centre-left political parties in the state, founded by the prominent Congress party leader K. Karunakaran in 1978.

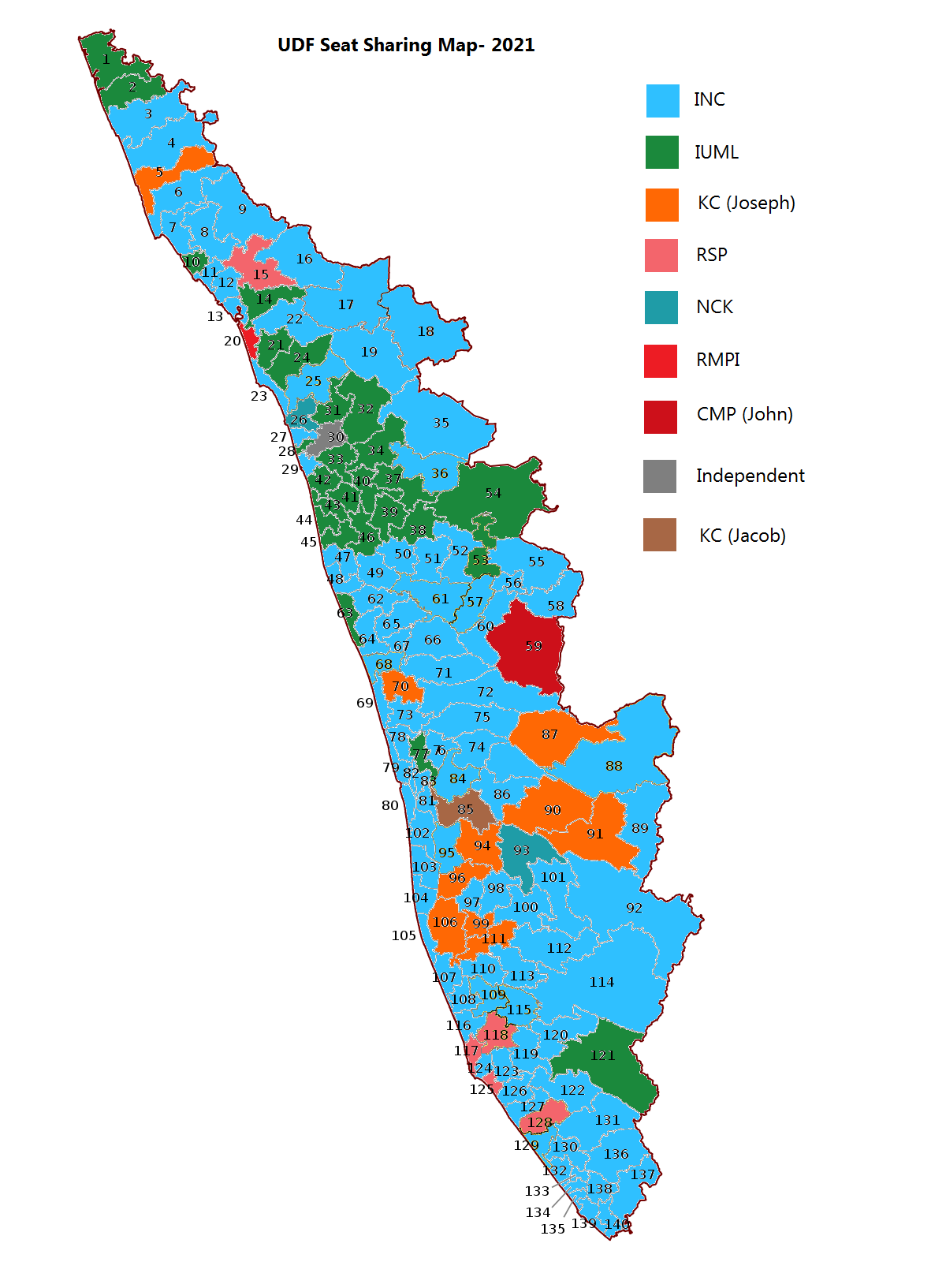
United Democratic Front seat sharing map

| Party | Flag | Symbol | Leader | Photo | Seats contested | Male | Female |
|---|---|---|---|---|---|---|---|
| INC | | | Mullappally Ramachandran | | 93 | 83 | 10 |
| IUML | | | Sayed Hyderali Shihab Thangal | | 25 | 24 | 1 |
| KEC | | | P. J. Joseph | | 10 | 10 | 0 |
| RSP | | | A. A. Aziz | | 5 | 5 | 0 |
| NCK | | | Mani C. Kappan | | 2 | 2 | 0 |
| KEC(J) | | | Anoop Jacob | | 1 | 1 | 0 |
| CMP | | | C. P. John | | 1 | 1 | 0 |
| RMPI | | | N. Venu | | 1 | 0 | 1 |
| Independents | | | | | 2 | 2 | 0 |
| Total | | | | | 140 | 128 | 12 |

=== National Democratic Alliance ===
National Democratic Alliance

It is an alliance of right-wing parties. NDA Kerala unit was constituted in 2016. The coalition consists of Bharatiya Janata Party, Bharath Dharma Jana Sena, All India Anna Dravida Munnetra Kazhagam and a variety of other smaller parties.

National Democratic Alliance seat sharing map

| Party | Flag | Symbol | Leader | Photo | Seats contested | Male | Female |
|---|---|---|---|---|---|---|---|
| BJP | | | K. Surendran | | 113 | 98 | 15 |
| BDJS | | | Thushar Vellapally | | 21 | 17 | 4 |
| AIADMK | | | G. Shobakumar | | 2 | 1 (Note: NDA endorsed a dummy AIADMK candidate after their initially chosen candidate had their nomination papers rejected.) | 1 |
| KKC | | | Vishnupuram Chandrasekharan | | 1 | 1 | 0 |
| JRP | | | C. K. Janu | | 1 | 0 | 1 |
| Total | | | | | 138 | 117 | 21 |

== Campaign ==
On 28 February 2021, the Left Democratic Front (LDF) released its campaign slogan for the Assembly election, "Urappanu LDF" (Malayalam: ഉറപ്പാണ് LDF) which translates to "LDF for sure". The alliance released its manifesto on 19 March.

The United Democratic Front (UDF) released their campaign slogan "Naadu Nannakan UDF" (നാട് നന്നാകാൻ UDF) which roughly translates to 'UDF for Kerala's Advancement'. The UDF released their election manifesto on 20 March 2020.

The BJP- led National Democratic Alliance released their campaign slogan "Puthiya Keralam Modikkoppam" (Malayalam: പുതിയ കേരളം മോദിക്കൊപ്പം) which roughly translates to 'New Kerala with Modi.' BJP pledged to ban Love Jihad if elected to power.

== Candidates ==
Many parties, including the CPI(M), the INC and the CPI, did not give tickets to most sitting MLAs who had already served two terms. A third of selected candidates had prior experience in local bodies. The Indian Union Muslim League fielded a female candidate - Noorbeena Rasheed in Kozhikode South - for the first time in 25 years. Anannyah Kumari Alex, contesting from Vengara, became the first ever transgender candidate to be nominated for Kerala assembly election, However, she suspended her campaign after alleged harassment from her party members.

Nominations of NDA candidates in Thalassery, Guruvayur and Devikulam were rejected by the Election Commission, citing incomplete nomination papers. Hence, the alliance offered support Democratic Social Justice Party (DSJP) candidate in Guruvayur, AIADMK candidate in Devikulam and for an independent candidate in Thalassery, however the latter rejected the support.

== Opinion polls ==
View source data.

| Date published | Polling agency | | | | Lead | Ref. |
| Date published | Polling agency | LDF | UDF | NDA | Lead | Ref. |
|---|---|---|---|---|---|---|
| 29 March 2021 | Asianet News–C fore | 82–91 | 46–54 | 3–7 | 12–21 | |
| 24 March 2021 | Mathrubhumi–CVoter | 73–83 | 56–66 | 0–1 | 3–13 | |
| 24 March 2021 | Manorama News–VMR | 77–82 | 54–59 | 0–3 | 7–12 | |
| 24 March 2021 | Times Now–CVoter | 77 | 62 | 1 | 7 | |
| 19 March 2021 | Mathrubhumi News–CVoter | 75-83 (79) | 55–60 (57) | 0–2 (1) | 5–13 (8) | |
| 15 March 2021 | ABP News–CVoter | 77–85 | 54–62 | 0–2 | 7–15 | |
| 15 March 2021 | MediaOne–P-Marq (Politique Marquer) | 74–80 | 58–64 | 0–2 | 4–10 | |
| 8 March 2021 | Times Now–CVoter | 82 | 56 | 1 | 11 | |
| 28 February 2021 | 24 News | 72–78 | 63–69 | 1–2 | 2–8 | |
| 27 February 2021 | ABP News–CVoter | 83–91 | 47–55 | 0–2 | 13–21 | |
| 25 February 2021 | Lok Poll | 75–80 | 60–65 | 0–1 | 5–10 | |
| 21 February 2021 | Spick Media - MCV Network Survey | 85 | 53 | 2 | 14 | |
| 21 February 2021 | 24 News | 68–78 | 62–72 | 1–2 | Hung | |
| 21 February 2021 | Asianet News–C fore | 72–78 | 59–65 | 3–7 | 2–8 | |
| 18 January 2021 | ABP News–CVoter | 81–89 | 41–47 | 0–2 | 11–19 | |
| 6 January 2021 | Lok Poll | 73–78 | 62–67 | 0–1 | 3–8 | |
| 4 July 2020 | Asianet News–C fore | 77–83 | 54–60 | 3–7 | 7–13 | |

=== Asianet News–C fore Survey (July 2020) ===
Vote share predicted by Asianet C-Fore Survey [04/07/2020]
| Social group | | LDF | UDF | NDA | Others | Lead |
|---|---|---|---|---|---|---|
| Total vote | | 42 | 39 | 18 | 1 | 3 |
| Seats | | 79 | 56 | 5 | 0 | 23 |
Region
| North | Vote Share | 43 | 39 | 18 | 1 | 4 |
| Central | Vote Share | 39 | 42 | 18 | 1 | 3 |
| South | Vote Share | 41 | 38 | 20 | 1 | 3 |
| North | Seats | 41 | 17 | 2 | 0 | 24 |
| Central | Seats | 18 | 23 | 1 | 0 | 5 |
| South | Seats | 20 | 16 | 2 | 0 | 4 |
Gender
| Men | | 41 | 34 | 16 | 9 | 7 |
| Women | | 34 | 35 | 13 | 18 | 1 |
Caste and Religion
| Muslims | | 49 | 31 | 20 | | 18 |
| Ezhava | | 47 | 23 | 24 | 6 | 23 |
| Jacobite/Orthodox/Marthoma/Latin | | 29 | 58 | 4 | 9 | 19 |
| Syro-Malabar Catholic Christians | | 24 | 61 | 3 | 12 | 37 |
| Dalits | | 37 | 25 | 22 | 16 | 12 |
| Nairs | | 24 | 42 | 27 | 7 | 15 |
| Other castes | | 17 | 40 | 33 | 10 | 7 |
Employment
| Students | | 44 | 29 | 15 | 12 | 15 |
| Government employees | | 51 | 21 | 7 | 21 | 30 |
| Farmers | | 58 | 25 | 15 | 2 | 33 |
| Homemakers | | 36 | 38 | 11 | 15 | 2 |
| Unemployed | | 27 | 51 | 16 | 6 | 24 |
| Private employees | | 25 | 42 | 18 | 15 | 17 |
| Entrepreneurs | | 4 | 54 | 32 | 10 | 22 |
Age
| 18-25 | | 43 | 30 | 15 | 12 | 13 |
| 26-35 | | 31 | 38 | 17 | 14 | 7 |
| 36-50 | | 40 | 31 | 16 | 13 | 9 |
| 50+ | | 36 | 44 | 5 | 15 | 8 |

== Exit polls ==
Exit polls were published after 7:30pm IST on 29 April, as per orders from Election Commission of India.

| Date published | Polling agency | | | | | Lead | Ref. |
| Date published | Polling agency | LDF | UDF | NDA | Others | Lead | Ref. |
|---|---|---|---|---|---|---|---|
| 29 April 2021 | India News iTV - Jan Ki Baat | 64– 76 | 61–71 | 2–4 | – | Hung | |
| 29 April 2021 | Patriotic Voter | 84–92 | 45–51 | 2–4 | 0–1 | 14–22 | |
| 29 April 2021 | India Today - Axis My India | 104–120 | 20–36 | 0–2 | 0–2 | 34–50 | |
| 29 April 2021 | Manorama News - VMR | 68–78 | 59–70 | 0–2 | 0–1 | Hung | |
| 29 April 2021 | News24 - Today's Chanakya | 93 - 111 | 26–44 | 0–6 | 0–2 | 23–41 | |
| 29 April 2021 | DB Live | 54–61 | 74–80 | 2–7 | – | 4–10 | |
| 29 April 2021 | Reporter TV - P-MARQ | 72–79 | 60–66 | 0–3 | 0–1 | 2–8 | |
| 29 April 2021 | Republic - CNX | 72– 80 | 58–64 | 1–5 | – | 2–9 | |
| 29 April 2021 | Sudarshan News | 70– 80 | 59–65 | 2–6 | 1–3 | Hung | |
| 29 April 2021 | Times Now / ABP - C-Voter | 71–77 | 62–68 | 0–2 | – | 1–7 | |
| 29 April 2021 | TV9 Bharatvarsh - POLSTRAT | 70– 80 | 59–69 | 0–2 | – | Hung | |

== Election ==
=== Voting ===
| Districts | Voter turnout | |
| District wise map of Kerala | District | % |
|---|---|---|
| | Kasargod | 76.64 |
| | Kannur | 80.17 |
| | Wayanad | 76.72 |
| | Kozhikode | 80.50 |
| | Malappuram | 75.80 |
| | Palakkad | 77.85 |
| | Thrissur | 75.71 |
| | Ernakulam | 75.85 |
| | Idukki | 71.97 |
| | Kottayam | 74.32 |
| | Alappuzha | 76.94 |
| | Pathanamthitta | 69.64 |
| | Kollam | 75.16 |
| | Thiruvananthapuram | 72.06 |
| Kerala | | 75.60 |

== Result ==
=== Summary ===
| 99 | 41 |
| LDF | UDF |

The incumbent LDF retained power with 99 seats, 8 more than in the previous election. This marks the first time an alliance has won consecutive terms in the state since 1977. The UDF won 41 seats, 6 less than before, although their vote share increased. The NDA lost their lone seat in Nemom and suffered a significant loss in vote-share. P. C. George, Kerala Janapaksham (Secular) candidate in Poonjar and the only MLA not part of any alliance, lost his sitting seat to the LDF, coming second.

Besides Poonjar, Kunnathunad, Perumbavoor, Kochi, Vypin, Kothamangalam and Muvattupuzha the NDA dropped to fourth position in Vengara, where an independent candidate overtook the BJP to become third. The Revolutionary Marxist Party of India opened its account in the State Legislative assembly, winning from Vadakara, a left-socialist stronghold, with outside support of UDF. In Pala, Mani C. Kappen won as a UDF Independent candidate.

K. K. Shailaja, who as Health Minister had won plaudits for her handling of the COVID-19 pandemic, was re-elected in Mattanur with a record majority of 67,013 votes. K. A. Shaji of Down to Earth pointed to the LDF government's success in minimising covid deaths and reducing economic hardship of people affected by the lockdown as the primary cause for its re-election.

In the aftermath of the election, leaders of LDF and UDF have alleged collusion of one another with BJP in an effort to undermine theirs.

Map displaying constituencies won by parties

| Alliance | Party | Abbr. | Popular vote | | | Seats | | |
| Alliance | Party | Abbr. | Votes | % | ±pp | Contested | Won | +/− |
|---|---|---|---|---|---|---|---|---|
| LDF | Communist Party of India (Marxist) | CPI(M) | 5,288,507 | 25.38 | ▼1.14 | 75 | 62 | ▲4 |
| LDF | Communist Party of India | CPI | 1,579,235 | 7.58 | ▼0.54 | 23 | 17 | ▼2 |
| LDF | Kerala Congress (M) | KC(M) | 684,363 | 3.28 | ▼0.71 | 12 | 5 | ▼1 |
| LDF | Janata Dal (Secular) | JD(S) | 265,789 | 1.28 | ▼0.17 | 4 | 2 | ▼1 |
| LDF | Nationalist Congress Party | NCP | 206,130 | 0.99 | ▼0.18 | 3 | 2 | ▲▼0 |
| LDF | Loktantrik Janata Dal | LJD | 193,010 | 0.93 | New | 3 | 1 | New |
| LDF | Indian National League | INL | 138,587 | 0.66 | ▲0.11 | 3 | 1 | ▲1 |
| LDF | Congress (Secular) | Cong(S) | 60,313 | 0.29 | | 1 | 1 | ▲▼0 |
| LDF | Total | | 10,555,616 | 45.43 | ▲1.95 | 140 | 99 | ▲8 |
| UDF | Indian National Congress | INC | 5,233,429 | 25.12 | ▲1.42 | 93 | 22 | ▲▼0 |
| UDF | Indian Union Muslim League | IUML | 1,723,593 | 8.27 | ▲0.87 | 25 | 15 | ▼3 |
| UDF | Kerala Congress | KEC | 554,115 | 2.66 | ▲2.48 | 10 | 2 | ▲2 |
| UDF | Revolutionary Socialist Party | RSP | 244,388 | 1.17 | ▲0.10 | 5 | 0 | ▲▼0 |
| UDF | Kerala Congress (Jacob) | KC(J) | 85,056 | 0.41 | ▲0.04 | 1 | 1 | ▲▼0 |
| UDF | Revolutionary Marxist Party of India | RMPI | 65,093 | 0.031 | New | 1 | 1 | New |
| UDF | Total | | 8,196,813 | 39.47 | ▲0.66 | 140 | 41 | ▼6 |
| NDA | Bharatiya Janata Party | BJP | 2,354,468 | 11.30 | ▲0.77 | 113 | 0 | ▼1 |
| NDA | Bharath Dharma Jana Sena | BDJS | 217,445 | 1.06 | ▼2.94 | 21 | 0 | ▲▼0 |
| NDA | All India Anna Dravida Munnetra Kazhagam | AIADMK | 10,376 | 0.05 | ▼0.12 | 1 | 0 | ▲▼0 |
| NDA | Total | | 2,354,468 | 12.41 | ▼2.55 | 140 | 0 | ▼1 |
| None | Bahujan Samaj Party | BSP | 48,379 | 0.23 | ▼0.01 | 72 | 0 | ▲▼0 |
| None | Twenty20 Party | TTP | 145,664 | 0.71 | ▲0.71 | 8 | 0 | ▲▼0 |
| None | Social Democratic Party of India | SDPI | 75,566 | 0.36 | ▲ | 40 | 0 | ▲▼0 |
| None | NOTA | | 97,693 | 0.47 | ▼0.06 | Steady | Steady | Steady |
| Total | | | 20,833,888 | 100.00 | | | 140 | |
| Valid votes | | | 20,833,888 | —N/a | | | | |
| Invalid votes | | —N/a | | | | | | |
| Votes cast / turnout | | | 20,903,233 | 76.00 | | | | |
| Registered voters | | | 27,503,768 | | | | | |

=== By alliance ===
Seat Share (By alliance)
1. LDF (70.7%)
2. UDF (29.3%)
3. NDA (0.00%)
Vote Share (By alliance)
1. LDF (45.4%)
2. UDF (39.5%)
3. NDA (12.4%)
4. Others (2.69%)

| LDF | SEATS | UDF | SEATS | NDA | SEATS |
|---|---|---|---|---|---|
| CPI(M) | 62 | INC | 21 | BJP | 0 |
| CPI | 17 | IUML | 15 | BDJS | 0 |
| KC(M) | 5 | KEC | 2 | AIADMK | 0 |
| JD(S) | 2 | RMPI | 1 | KKC | 0 |
| NCP | 2 | NCK | 1 | JRS | 0 |
| KC(B) | 1 | KC(J) | 1 | DSJP | 0 |
| INL | 1 | CMP | 0 | | |
| LJD | 1 | RSP | 0 | | |
| C(S) | 1 | IND | 0 | | |
| JKC | 1 | | | | |
| IND | 6 | | | | |
| Total | 99 | Total | 41 | Total | 0 |
| Change | +8 | Change | -6 | Change | -1 |
| Vote Share | 45.43% | Vote Share | 39.47% | Vote Share | 12.41% |
| Vote Share Change | + 1.95 | Vote Share Change | + 0.66 | Vote Share Change | 2.55 |

=== By region ===
| Region wise map of Kerala | Region | Seats | | | | |
| Region wise map of Kerala | Region | Seats | UDF | LDF | NDA | OTH |
| | North Kerala | 32 | 8 | 24 | 0 | 0 |
| | Central Kerala | 55 | 24 | 31 | 0 | 0 |
| | South Kerala | 53 | 9 | 44 | 0 | 0 |
| | Total | 140 | 41 | 99 | 0 | 0 |

=== By district ===
| District wise map of Kerala | District | Seats | | | | |
| District wise map of Kerala | District | Seats | UDF | LDF | NDA | OTH |
| | Kasaragod | 5 | 2 | 3 | 0 | 0 |
| | Kannur | 11 | 2 | 9 | 0 | 0 |
| | Wayanad | 3 | 2 | 1 | 0 | 0 |
| | Kozhikode | 13 | 2 | 11 | 0 | 0 |
| | Malappuram | 16 | 12 | 4 | 0 | 0 |
| | Palakkad | 12 | 2 | 10 | 0 | 0 |
| | Thrissur | 13 | 1 | 12 | 0 | 0 |
| | Ernakulam | 14 | 9 | 5 | 0 | 0 |
| | Idukki | 5 | 1 | 4 | 0 | 0 |
| | Kottayam | 9 | 4 | 5 | 0 | 0 |
| | Alappuzha | 9 | 1 | 8 | 0 | 0 |
| | Pathanamthitta | 5 | 0 | 5 | 0 | 0 |
| | Kollam | 11 | 2 | 9 | 0 | 0 |
| | Trivandrum | 14 | 1 | 13 | 0 | 0 |
| | Total | 140 | 41 | 99 | 0 | 0 |

=== By constituency ===
| Constituency | | | Winner | | | | | Runner-up | | | | | Margin |
| # | Name | Turnout(%) | Candidate | Party | Alliance | Votes | % | Candidate | Party | Alliance | Votes | % | Margin |
|---|---|---|---|---|---|---|---|---|---|---|---|---|---|
Kasaragod district
| 1 | Manjeshwar | 77.93 | A. K. M. Ashraf | IUML | UDF | 65,758 | 38.14 | K. Surendran | BJP | NDA | 65,013 | 37.70 | 745 |
| 2 | Kasaragod | 72.05 | N. A. Nellikkunnu | IUML | UDF | 63,296 | 43.80 | K. Shreekanth | BJP | NDA | 50,395 | 34.88 | 12,901 |
| 3 | Udma | 77.37 | C. H. Kunhambu | CPI(M) | LDF | 78,664 | 47.58 | Balakrishnan Periye | INC | UDF | 65,342 | 39.52 | 13,322 |
| 4 | Kanhangad | 76.44 | E. Chandrasekharan | CPI | LDF | 84,615 | 50.72 | P. V. Suresh | INC | UDF | 57,476 | 34.45 | 27,139 |
| 5 | Thrikaripur | 79.4 | M. Rajagopalan | CPI(M) | LDF | 86,151 | 53.71 | M. P. Joseph | KEC | UDF | 60,014 | 37.41 | 26,137 |
Kannur district
| 6 | Payyanur | 81.87 | TI. Madhusoodanan | CPI(M) | LDF | 93,695 | 62.49 | M. Pradeep Kumar | INC | UDF | 43,915 | 29.29 | 49,780 |
| 7 | Kalliasseri | 78.86 | M. Vijin | CPI(M) | LDF | 88,252 | 60.62 | Brijesh Kumar | INC | UDF | 43,859 | 30.13 | 44,393 |
| 8 | Taliparamba | 83.44 | M. V. Govindan | CPI(M) | LDF | 92,870 | 52.14 | Abdul Rasheed V. P. | INC | UDF | 70,181 | 39.4 | 22,689 |
| 9 | Irikkur | 78.2 | Sajeev Joseph | INC | UDF | 76,764 | 50.33 | Saji Kuttiyanimattom | KC(M) | LDF | 66,754 | 43.77 | 10,010 |
| 10 | Azhikode | 79.85 | K. V. Sumesh | CPI(M) | LDF | 65,794 | 45.41 | K. M. Shaji | IUML | UDF | 59,653 | 41.17 | 6,141 |
| 11 | Kannur | 77.29 | Kadannappalli Ramachandran | Cong(S) | LDF | 60,313 | 44.98 | Satheeshan Pacheni | INC | UDF | 58,568 | 43.68 | 1,745 |
| 12 | Dharmadam | 83.33 | Pinarayi Vijayan | CPI(M) | LDF | 95,522 | 59.61 | C. Raghunath | INC | UDF | 45,399 | 28.33 | 50,123 |
| 13 | Thalassery | 76.13 | A. N. Shamseer | CPI(M) | LDF | 81,810 | 61.52 | M. P. Aravindakshan | INC | UDF | 45,009 | 33.84 | 36,801 |
| 14 | Kuthuparamba | 80.37 | K. P. Mohanan | LJD | LDF | 70,626 | 45.36 | P. K. Abdulla | IUML | UDF | 61,085 | 39.23 | 9,541 |
| 15 | Mattannur | 82.11 | K. K. Shailaja | CPI(M) | LDF | 96,129 | 61.97 | Illikkal Agasthy | RSP | UDF | 35,166 | 22.67 | 60,963 |
| 16 | Peravoor | 80.41 | Sunny Joseph | INC | UDF | 66,706 | 46.93 | Sakeer Hussain | CPI(M) | LDF | 63,534 | 44.7 | 3,172 |
Wayanad district
| 17 | Mananthavady | 78.33 | O. R. Kelu | CPI(M) | LDF | 72,536 | 47.54 | P. K. Jayalakshmi | INC | UDF | 63,254 | 41.46 | 9,282 |
| 18 | Sulthan Bathery | 75.99 | I. C. Balakrishnan | INC | UDF | 81,077 | 48.42 | M. S. Viswanathan | CPI(M) | LDF | 69,255 | 41.36 | 11,822 |
| 19 | Kalpetta | 75.84 | T. Siddique | INC | UDF | 70,252 | 46.15 | M. V. Shreyams Kumar | LJD | LDF | 64,782 | 42.56 | 5,470 |
Kozhikode district
| 20 | Vadakara | 81.9 | K. K. Rema | RMPI | UDF | 65,093 | 47.63 | Manayath Chandran | LJD | LDF | 57,602 | 42.15 | 7,491 |
| 21 | Kuttiady | 83.94 | K. P. Kunhammadkutty | CPI(M) | LDF | 80,143 | 47.2 | Parakkal Abdulla | IUML | UDF | 79,810 | 47.01 | 333 |
| 22 | Nadapuram | 81.14 | E. K. Vijayan | CPI | LDF | 83,293 | 47.46 | K.Praveen Kumar | INC | UDF | 79,258 | 45.16 | 4,035 |
| 23 | Koyilandy | 78.64 | Kanathil Jameela | CPI(M) | LDF | 75,628 | 46.66 | N. Subramanian | INC | UDF | 67,156 | 41.43 | 8,472 |
| 24 | Perambra | 82.86 | T. P. Ramakrishnan | CPI(M) | LDF | 86,023 | 52.54 | C. H. Ibrahimkutty | IND | UDF | 63,431 | 38.74 | 22,592 |
| 25 | Balussery | 80.91 | K. M. Sachin Dev | CPI(M) | LDF | 91,839 | 50.47 | Dharmajan Bolgatty | INC | UDF | 71,467 | 39.28 | 20,372 |
| 26 | Elathur | 80.68 | A. K. Saseendran | NCP | LDF | 83,639 | 50.89 | Sulfikar Mayoori | KDP | UDF | 45,137 | 27.46 | 38,502 |
| 27 | Kozhikode North | 75.98 | Thottathil Raveendran | CPI(M) | LDF | 59,124 | 42.98 | K. M. Abhijith | INC | UDF | 46,196 | 33.58 | 12,928 |
| 28 | Kozhikode South | 75.62 | Ahamed Devarkovil | INL | LDF | 52,557 | 44.15 | P. K. Noorbeena Rasheed | IUML | UDF | 40,098 | 33.68 | 12,459 |
| 29 | Beypore | 79.4 | P. A. Mohammed Riyas | CPI(M) | LDF | 82,165 | 49.73 | P. M. Niyas | INC | UDF | 53,418 | 32.33 | 28,747 |
| 30 | Kunnamangalam | 83.57 | P. T. A. Rahim | IND | LDF | 85,138 | 43.93 | Dinesh Perumanna | IND | UDF | 74,862 | 38.62 | 10,276 |
| 31 | Koduvally | 82.44 | M. K. Muneer | IUML | UDF | 72,336 | 47.86 | Karat Razak | IND | LDF | 65,992 | 43.66 | 6,344 |
| 32 | Thiruvambady | 79.4 | Linto Joseph | CPI(M) | LDF | 67,867 | 47.46 | C. P. Cheriya Muhammed | IUML | UDF | 63,224 | 44.21 | 5,596 |
Malappuram district
| 33 | Kondotty | 80.25 | T. V. Ibrahim | IUML | UDF | 82,759 | 50.42 | Sulaiman Haji | IND | LDF | 65,093 | 39.66 | 17,666 |
| 34 | Eranad | 79.69 | P. K. Basheer | IUML | UDF | 78,076 | 54.49 | K. T. Abdurahman | IND | LDF | 55,530 | 38.76 | 22,546 |
| 35 | Nilambur | 76.71 | P. V. Anvar | IND | LDF | 81,227 | 46.9 | V. V. Prakash | INC | UDF | 78,527 | 45.34 | 2,700 |
| 36 | Wandoor | 75.17 | A. P. Anil Kumar | INC | UDF | 87,415 | 51.44 | P. Midhuna | CPI(M) | LDF | 71,852 | 42.28 | 15,563 |
| 37 | Manjeri | 75.95 | U. A. Latheef | IUML | UDF | 78,836 | 50.22 | P. Dibona Nassar | CPI | LDF | 64,263 | 40.93 | 14,573 |
| 38 | Perinthalmanna | 76.15 | Najeeb Kanthapuram | IUML | UDF | 76,530 | 46.21 | K. P. Mustafa | IND | LDF | 76,492 | 46.19 | 38 |
| 39 | Mankada | 77.32 | Manjalamkuzhi Ali | IUML | UDF | 83,231 | 49.46 | T. K. Rasheed Ali | CPI(M) | LDF | 76,985 | 45.75 | 6,246 |
| 40 | Malappuram | 76.56 | P. Ubaidulla | IUML | UDF | 93,166 | 57.57 | P. Abdurahman | CPI(M) | LDF | 57,958 | 35.82 | 35,208 |
| 41 | Vengara | 71.09 | P. K. Kunhalikutty | IUML | UDF | 70,381 | 53.5 | P. Jiji | CPI(M) | LDF | 39,785 | 30.24 | 30,596 |
| 42 | Vallikkunnu | 76.27 | P. Abdul Hameed | IUML | UDF | 71,823 | 47.43 | A. P. Abdul Wahab | INL | LDF | 57,707 | 38.11 | 14,116 |
| 43 | Tirurangadi | 75.07 | K. P. A. Majeed | IUML | UDF | 73,499 | 49.74 | Niyas Pulikkalakath | IND | LDF | 63,921 | 43.26 | 9,578 |
| 44 | Tanur | 77.87 | V. Abdurahman | NSC | LDF | 70,704 | 46.34 | P. K. Firos | IUML | UDF | 69,719 | 45.7 | 985 |
| 45 | Tirur | 74.45 | Kurukkoli Moideen | IUML | UDF | 82,314 | 48.21 | Ghafoor P. Lillis | CPI(M) | LDF | 75,100 | 43.98 | 7,214 |
| 46 | Kottakkal | 74.01 | K. K. Abid Hussain Thangal | IUML | UDF | 81,700 | 51.08 | N. A. Muhammad Kutty | NCP | LDF | 65,112 | 40.71 | 16,588 |
| 47 | Thavanur | 75.39 | K. T. Jaleel | IND | LDF | 70,358 | 46.46 | Firoz Kunnumparambil | INC | UDF | 67,794 | 44.77 | 2,564 |
| 48 | Ponnani | 70.9 | P. Nandakumar | CPI(M) | LDF | 74,668 | 51.35 | A. M. Rohit | INC | UDF | 57,625 | 39.63 | 17,043 |
Palakkad district
| 49 | Thrithala | 78.54 | M. B. Rajesh | CPI(M) | LDF | 69,814 | 45.84 | V. T. Balram | INC | UDF | 66,798 | 43.86 | 3,016 |
| 50 | Pattambi | 78.06 | Muhammed Muhsin | CPI | LDF | 75,311 | 49.58 | Riyas Mukkoli | INC | UDF | 57,337 | 37.74 | 17,974 |
| 51 | Shornur | 78.32 | P. Mammikutty | CPI(M) | LDF | 74,400 | 48.98 | T. H. Feroz Babu | INC | UDF | 37,726 | 24.83 | 36,674 |
| 52 | Ottapalam | 77.54 | K. Premkumar | CPI(M) | LDF | 74,859 | 46.45 | P. Sarin | INC | UDF | 59,707 | 37.05 | 15,152 |
| 53 | Kongad | 76.83 | K. Shanthakumari | CPI(M) | LDF | 67,881 | 49.01 | U. C. Raman | IUML | UDF | 40,662 | 29.36 | 27,219 |
| 54 | Mannarkkad | 76.75 | N. Shamsudheen | IUML | UDF | 71,657 | 47.11 | K. P. Suresh Raj | CPI | LDF | 65,787 | 43.25 | 5,870 |
| 55 | Malampuzha | 76.94 | A. Prabhakaran | CPI(M) | LDF | 75,934 | 46.41 | C. Krishnakumar | BJP | NDA | 50,200 | 30.68 | 25,734 |
| 56 | Palakkad | 75.44 | Shafi Parambil | INC | UDF | 54,079 | 38.06 | E. Sreedharan | BJP | NDA | 50,220 | 35.34 | 3,859 |
| 57 | Tarur | 77.12 | P. P. Sumod | CPI(M) | LDF | 67,744 | 51.58 | K. A. Sheeba | INC | UDF | 43,213 | 32.90 | 24,531 |
| 58 | Chittur | 80.88 | K. Krishnankutty | JD(S) | LDF | 84,672 | 55.38 | Sumesh Achuthan | INC | UDF | 50,794 | 33.22 | 33,878 |
| 59 | Nenmara | 78.64 | K. Babu | CPI(M) | LDF | 80,145 | 52.89 | C. N. Vijayakrishnan | CMP | UDF | 51,441 | 33.95 | 28,704 |
| 60 | Alathur | 79.1 | K. D. Prasenan | CPI(M) | LDF | 74,653 | 55.15 | Palayam Pradeep | INC | UDF | 40,535 | 29.94 | 34,118 |
Thrissur district
| 61 | Chelakkara | 77.46 | K. Radhakrishnan | CPI(M) | LDF | 83,415 | 54.41 | C. C. Sreekumar | INC | UDF | 44,015 | 28.71 | 39,400 |
| 62 | Kunnamkulam | 78.24 | A. C. Moideen | CPI(M) | LDF | 75,532 | 48.78 | K. Jayasankar | INC | UDF | 48,901 | 31.58 | 26,631 |
| 63 | Guruvayur | 69.65 | N. K. Akbar | CPI(M) | LDF | 77,072 | 52.52 | K. N. A. Khader | IUML | UDF | 58,804 | 40.07 | 18,268 |
| 64 | Manalur | 75.63 | Murali Perunelly | CPI(M) | LDF | 78,337 | 46.77 | Vijay Hari | INC | UDF | 48,461 | 28.93 | 29,876 |
| 65 | Wadakkanchery | 78.18 | Xavier Chittilappilly | CPI(M) | LDF | 81,026 | 47.7 | Anil Akkara | INC | UDF | 65,858 | 38.77 | 15,168 |
| 66 | Ollur | 75.45 | K. Rajan | CPI | LDF | 76,657 | 49.09 | Jose Valloor | INC | UDF | 55,151 | 35.31 | 21,506 |
| 67 | Thrissur | 70.78 | P. Balachandran | CPI | LDF | 44,263 | 34.25 | Padmaja Venugopal | INC | UDF | 43,317 | 33.52 | 946 |
| 68 | Nattika | 73.14 | C. C. Mukundan | CPI | LDF | 72,930 | 47.49 | Sunil Lalur | INC | UDF | 44,499 | 28.98 | 28,431 |
| 69 | Kaipamangalam | 78.82 | E. T. Taison | CPI | LDF | 73,161 | 53.76 | Sobha Subin | INC | UDF | 50,463 | 37.08 | 22,698 |
| 70 | Irinjalakuda | 77.17 | R. Bindu | CPI(M) | LDF | 62,493 | 40.27 | Thomas Unniyadan | KEC | UDF | 56,544 | 36.44 | 5,949 |
| 71 | Puthukkad | 77.86 | K. K. Ramachandran | CPI(M) | LDF | 73,365 | 46.94 | Sunil Anthikad | INC | UDF | 46,012 | 29.44 | 27,353 |
| 72 | Chalakudy | 74.42 | T. J. Saneesh Kumar Joseph | INC | UDF | 61,888 | 43.23 | Dennis Antony | KC(M) | LDF | 60,831 | 42.49 | 1,057 |
| 73 | Kodungallur | 77.38 | V. R. Sunil Kumar | CPI | LDF | 71,457 | 47.99 | M. P. Jackson | INC | UDF | 47,564 | 31.94 | 23,893 |
Ernakulam district
| 74 | Perumbavoor | 78.37 | Eldhose Kunnappilly | INC | UDF | 53,484 | 37.1 | Babu Joseph | KC(M) | LDF | 50,585 | 35.09 | 2,899 |
| 75 | Angamaly | 78.16 | Roji M. John | INC | UDF | 71,562 | 51.86 | Jose Thettayil | JD(S) | LDF | 55,633 | 40.31 | 15,929 |
| 76 | Aluva | 76.72 | Anwar Sadath | INC | UDF | 73,703 | 49.00 | Shelna Nishad | CPI(M) | LDF | 54,817 | 36.44 | 18,886 |
| 77 | Kalamassery | 77.42 | P. Rajeev | CPI(M) | LDF | 77,141 | 49.49 | V. E. Gafoor | IUML | UDF | 61,805 | 39.65 | 15,336 |
| 78 | Paravur | 79.02 | V. D. Satheesan | INC | UDF | 82,264 | 51.87 | M. T. Nixon | CPI | LDF | 60,963 | 38.44 | 21,301 |
| 79 | Vypin | 76.18 | K. N. Unnikrishnan | CPI(M) | LDF | 53,858 | 41.24 | Deepak Joy | INC | UDF | 45,657 | 34.96 | 8,201 |
| 80 | Kochi | 70.93 | K. J. Maxi | CPI(M) | LDF | 54,632 | 42.45 | Tony Chammany | INC | UDF | 40,553 | 31.51 | 14,079 |
| 81 | Thrippunithura | 73.83 | K. Babu | INC | UDF | 65,875 | 42.14 | M. Swaraj | CPI(M) | LDF | 64,883 | 41.51 | 992 |
| 82 | Ernakulam | 66.87 | T. J. Vinod | INC | UDF | 45,930 | 41.72 | Shaji George | IND | LDF | 34,960 | 31.75 | 10,970 |
| 83 | Thrikkakara | 70.36 | P. T. Thomas | INC | UDF | 59,839 | 43.82 | J. Jacob | IND | LDF | 45,510 | 33.32 | 14,329 |
| 84 | Kunnathunad | 82.93 | P. V. Sreenijin | CPI(M) | LDF | 52,351 | 33.79 | V. P. Sajeendran | INC | UDF | 49,636 | 32.04 | 2,715 |
| 85 | Piravom | 74.85 | Anoop Jacob | KC(J) | UDF | 85,056 | 53.8 | Sindhumol Jacob | KC(M) | LDF | 59,692 | 37.76 | 25,364 |
| 86 | Muvattupuzha | 75.83 | Mathew Kuzhalnadan | INC | UDF | 64,425 | 44.63 | Eldo Abraham | CPI | LDF | 58,264 | 40.36 | 6,161 |
| 87 | Kothamangalam | 79.4 | Antony John | CPI(M) | LDF | 64,234 | 46.99 | Shibu Thekkumpuram | KEC | UDF | 57,629 | 42.16 | 6,605 |
Idukki district
| 88 | Devikulam | 68.53 | A. Raja | CPI(M) | LDF | 59,049 | 51.00 | D. Kumar | INC | UDF | 51,201 | 44.22 | 7,848 |
| 89 | Udumbanchola | 74.84 | M. M. Mani | CPI(M) | LDF | 77,381 | 61.80 | E. M. Augusthy | INC | UDF | 39,076 | 31.21 | 38,305 |
| 90 | Thodupuzha | 72.76 | P. J. Joseph | KEC | UDF | 67,495 | 48.63 | K. I. Antony | KC(M) | LDF | 47,236 | 34.03 | 20,259 |
| 91 | Idukki | 70.64 | Roshy Augustine | KC(M) | LDF | 62,368 | 47.48 | K. Francis George | KEC | UDF | 56,795 | 43.24 | 5,573 |
| 92 | Peerumade | 73.06 | Vazhoor Soman | CPI | LDF | 60,141 | 47.25 | Syriac Thomas | INC | UDF | 58,306 | 45.81 | 1,835 |
Kottayam district
| 93 | Pala | 75.26 | Mani C. Kappan | KDP | UDF | 69,804 | 50.43 | Jose K. Mani | KC(M) | LDF | 54,426 | 39.32 | 15,378 |
| 94 | Kaduthuruthy | 70.48 | Monce Joseph | KEC | UDF | 59,666 | 45.4 | Stephen George | KC(M) | LDF | 55,410 | 42.17 | 4,256 |
| 95 | Vaikom | 77.69 | C. K. Asha | CPI | LDF | 71,388 | 55.96 | P. R. Sona | INC | UDF | 42,266 | 33.13 | 29,122 |
| 96 | Ettumanoor | 75.45 | V. N. Vasavan | CPI(M) | LDF | 58,289 | 46.2 | Prince Lukose | KEC | UDF | 43,986 | 34.86 | 14,303 |
| 97 | Kottayam | 74.48 | Thiruvanchoor Radhakrishnan | INC | UDF | 65,401 | 53.72 | K. Anilkumar | CPI(M) | LDF | 46,658 | 38.33 | 18,743 |
| 98 | Puthuppally | 75.35 | Oommen Chandy | INC | UDF | 63,372 | 48.08 | Jaick C. Thomas | CPI(M) | LDF | 54,328 | 41.22 | 9,044 |
| 99 | Changanassery | 71.98 | Job Michael | KC(M) | LDF | 55,425 | 44.85 | V. J. Laly | KEC | UDF | 49,366 | 39.94 | 6,059 |
| 100 | Kanjirappally | 73.96 | N. Jayaraj | KC(M) | LDF | 60,299 | 43.79 | Joseph Vazhackan | INC | UDF | 46,596 | 33.84 | 13,703 |
| 101 | Poonjar | 74.21 | Sebastian Kulathunkal | KC(M) | LDF | 58,668 | 41.94 | P. C. George | KJ(S) | None | 41,851 | 29.92 | 16,817 |
Alappuzha district
| 102 | Aroor | 82.58 | Daleema Jojo | CPI(M) | LDF | 75,617 | 45.97 | Shanimol Usman | INC | UDF | 68,604 | 41.71 | 7,013 |
| 103 | Cherthala | 83.8 | P. Prasad | CPI | LDF | 83,702 | 47.00 | S. Sarath | INC | UDF | 77,554 | 43.55 | 6,148 |
| 104 | Alappuzha | 78.43 | P. P. Chitharanjan | CPI(M) | LDF | 73,412 | 46.33 | K. S. Manoj | INC | UDF | 61,768 | 38.98 | 11,644 |
| 105 | Ambalappuzha | 76.82 | H. Salam | CPI(M) | LDF | 61,365 | 44.79 | M. Liju | INC | UDF | 50,240 | 36.67 | 11,125 |
| 106 | Kuttanad | 74.86 | Thomas K. Thomas | NCP | LDF | 57,379 | 45.67 | Jacob Abraham | KEC | UDF | 51,863 | 41.28 | 5,516 |
| 107 | Haripad | 76.6 | Ramesh Chennithala | INC | UDF | 72,768 | 48.31 | R. Sajilal | CPI | LDF | 59,102 | 39.24 | 13,666 |
| 108 | Kayamkulam | 75.47 | U. Prathibha | CPI(M) | LDF | 77,348 | 47.97 | Aritha Babu | INC | UDF | 71,050 | 44.06 | 6,298 |
| 109 | Mavelikara | 73.28 | M. S. Arun Kumar | CPI(M) | LDF | 71,743 | 47.61 | K. K. Shaju | INC | UDF | 47,026 | 31.21 | 24,717 |
| 110 | Chengannur | 70.59 | Saji Cherian | CPI(M) | LDF | 71,502 | 48.58 | M. Murali | INC | UDF | 39,409 | 26.78 | 32,093 |
Pathanamthitta district
| 111 | Thiruvalla | 65.88 | Mathew T. Thomas | JD(S) | LDF | 62,178 | 44.56 | Kunju Koshy Paul | KEC | UDF | 50,757 | 36.37 | 11,421 |
| 112 | Ranni | 65.95 | Pramod Narayan | KC(M) | LDF | 52,669 | 41.22 | Rinku Cheriyan | INC | UDF | 51,384 | 40.21 | 1,285 |
| 113 | Aranmula | 68.13 | Veena George | CPI(M) | LDF | 74,950 | 46.3 | K. Sivadasan Nair | INC | UDF | 55,947 | 34.56 | 19,003 |
| 114 | Konni | 73.83 | K. U. Jenish Kumar | CPI(M) | LDF | 62,318 | 41.62 | Robin Peter | INC | UDF | 53,810 | 35.94 | 8,508 |
| 115 | Adoor (SC) | 74.4 | Chittayam Gopakumar | CPI | LDF | 66,569 | 42.83 | M G Kannan | INC | UDF | 63,650 | 40.96 | 2,919 |
Kollam district
| 116 | Karunagappally | 80.85 | C. R. Mahesh | INC | UDF | 94,225 | 54.38 | R. Ramachandran | CPI(M) | LDF | 65,017 | 37.52 | 29,208 |
| 117 | Chavara | 78.5 | Sujith Vijayanpillai | IND | LDF | 63,282 | 44.29 | Shibu Baby John | RSP | UDF | 62,186 | 43.52 | 1,096 |
| 118 | Kunnathur | 77.69 | Kovoor Kunjumon | IND | LDF | 69,436 | 43.13 | Ullas Kovoor | RSP | UDF | 66,646 | 41.4 | 2,790 |
| 119 | Kottarakkara | 74.6 | K. N. Balagopal | CPI(M) | LDF | 68,770 | 45.98 | Resmi R. | INC | UDF | 57,956 | 38.75 | 10,814 |
| 120 | Pathanapuram | 74.18 | K. B. Ganesh Kumar | KC(B) | LDF | 67,276 | 49.09 | Jyothikumar Chamakkala | INC | UDF | 52,940 | 38.63 | 14,336 |
| 121 | Punalur | 71.03 | P. S. Supal | CPI | LDF | 80,428 | 54.99 | Abdurahiman Randathani | IUML | UDF | 43,371 | 29.66 | 37,057 |
| 122 | Chadayamangalam | 73.23 | J. Chinchu Rani | CPI | LDF | 67,252 | 45.69 | M. M. Naseer | INC | UDF | 53,574 | 36.4 | 13,678 |
| 123 | Kundara | 75.91 | P. C. Vishnunath | INC | UDF | 76,405 | 48.85 | J. Mercykutty Amma | CPI(M) | LDF | 71,882 | 45.96 | 4,523 |
| 124 | Kollam | 74.05 | Mukesh | CPI(M) | LDF | 58,524 | 44.86 | Bindhu Krishna | INC | UDF | 56,452 | 43.27 | 2,072 |
| 125 | Eravipuram | 72.38 | M. Noushad | CPI(M) | LDF | 71,573 | 56.25 | Babu Divakaran | RSP | UDF | 43,452 | 34.15 | 28,121 |
| 126 | Chathannoor | 74.39 | G. S. Jayalal | CPI | LDF | 59,296 | 43.12 | B. B. Gopakumar | BJP | NDA | 42,090 | 30.61 | 17,206 |
Thiruvananthapuram district
| 127 | Varkala | 72.16 | V. Joy | CPI(M) | LDF | 68,816 | 50.89 | B. R. M. Shefeer | INC | UDF | 50,995 | 37.71 | 17,821 |
| 128 | Attingal | 72.93 | O. S. Ambika | CPI(M) | LDF | 69,898 | 47.35 | P. Sudheer | BJP | NDA | 38,262 | 25.92 | 31,636 |
| 129 | Chirayinkeezhu | 73.26 | V. Sasi | CPI | LDF | 62,634 | 43.17 | B. S. Anoop | INC | UDF | 48,617 | 33.51 | 14,017 |
| 130 | Nedumangad | 73.8 | G. R. Anil | CPI | LDF | 72,742 | 47.54 | P. S. Prasanth | INC | UDF | 49,433 | 32.31 | 23,309 |
| 131 | Vamanapuram | 73.14 | D. K. Murali | CPI(M) | LDF | 73,137 | 49.91 | Anad Jayan | INC | UDF | 62,895 | 42.92 | 10,242 |
| 132 | Kazhakootam | 71.37 | Kadakampally Surendran | CPI(M) | LDF | 63,690 | 46.04 | Sobha Surendran | BJP | NDA | 40,193 | 29.06 | 23,497 |
| 133 | Vattiyoorkavu | 66.19 | V. K. Prasanth | CPI(M) | LDF | 61,111 | 41.44 | V.V. Rajesh | BJP | NDA | 39,596 | 28.77 | 21,515 |
| 134 | Thiruvananthapuram | 63.03 | Antony Raju | JKC | LDF | 48,748 | 38.01 | V. S. Sivakumar | INC | UDF | 41,659 | 32.49 | 7,089 |
| 135 | Nemom | 71.49 | V. Sivankutty | CPI(M) | LDF | 55,837 | 38.24 | Kummanam Rajasekharan | BJP | NDA | 51,888 | 35.54 | 3,949 |
| 136 | Aruvikkara | 75.39 | G. Stephen | CPI(M) | LDF | 66,776 | 45.83 | K. S. Sabarinathan | INC | UDF | 61,730 | 42.37 | 5,046 |
| 137 | Parassala | 74.24 | C. K. Hareendran | CPI(M) | LDF | 78,548 | 48.16 | Sajitha Ressal | INC | UDF | 52,720 | 32.23 | 25,828 |
| 138 | Kattakkada | 74.39 | I. B. Sathish | CPI(M) | LDF | 66,293 | 45.49 | Malayinkeezhu Venugopal | INC | UDF | 43,062 | 29.55 | 23,231 |
| 139 | Kovalam | 72.81 | M. Vincent | INC | UDF | 74,868 | 47.06 | Neelalohithadasan Nadar | JD(S) | LDF | 63,306 | 39.79 | 11,562 |
| 140 | Neyyattinkara | 74.7 | K. Ansalan | CPI(M) | LDF | 65,497 | 47.02 | R. Selvaraj | INC | UDF | 51,235 | 36.78 | 14,262 |

== By-elections ==
| Constituency | | Winner | | | | | Runner-up | | | | | Margin |
| # | Name | Candidate | Party | Alliance | Votes | % | Candidate | Party | Alliance | Votes | % | Margin |
|---|---|---|---|---|---|---|---|---|---|---|---|---|
| 83 | Thrikkakara | Uma Thomas | INC | UDF | 72,770 | 53.76 | Jo Joseph | CPI(M) | LDF | 47,754 | 35.28 | 25,016 |
| 98 | Puthuppally | Chandy Oommen | INC | UDF | 80,144 | 61.38 | Jaick C. Thomas | CPI(M) | LDF | 42,425 | 32.49 | 37,719 |
| 56 | Palakkad | Rahul Mamkootathil | INC | UDF | 58,052 | 42.27 | C. Krishna Kumar | BJP | NDA | 39,549 | 28.26 | 18,840 |
| 61 | Chelakkara | U. R. Pradeep | CPI(M) | LDF | 64,827 | 41.44 | Ramya Haridas | INC | UDF | 52,626 | 33.64 | 12,201 |
| 35 | Nilambur | Aryadan Shoukath | INC | UDF | 77,737 | 44.17 | M. Swaraj | CPI(M) | LDF | 66,660 | 37.88 | 11,077 |

== Aftermath ==
=== Government formation ===
The incumbent Chief Minister Pinarayi Vijayan was sworn in on 20 May along with 20 other cabinet members, 18 of whom were fresh faces. The exclusion of incumbent Health Minister K. K. Shailaja from the cabinet drew criticism from the public and from some CPI(M) members. The swearing-in ceremony, which was restricted to 500 participants due to a state-wide lockdown, was not attended by opposition MLAs and representatives from Central government, citing COVID protocol concerns.

V. D. Satheesan replaced Ramesh Chennithala as the Leader of the Opposition in the Niyamasabha, after the decision was made by the Congress High Command.

=== Kodakara hawala scandal ===
A few weeks after announcement of election results, allegations were raised against BJP leadership of Kerala for carrying illegal black money (hawala), in relation to the 2021 election. Kerala Police seized ₹3.5 crore in cash at Kodakara 3 days before the election. The money was allegedly looted and was to be used for BJP's election campaign. BJP state president K. Surendran was the chief accused in the case. The case was later handed over to Enforcement Directorate.

=== Other events ===
On 20 March 2023, Kerala High Court nullified the election in Devikulam, where elected members are required to belong to Scheduled Castes (SC), after establishing that the elected MLA, A. Raja of CPI(M), did not belong to SC community and was hence deemed ineligible to be elected from the constituency. The court has stayed the decision to allow Raja to file an appeal to the Supreme Court.
