= Anna Democratic Human Rights Movement Party of India =

Political party in India

- Abbreviation: ADHRMPI
- President: Usha Kottarakkara
- General Secretary: Saji Kollam
- Founder: Thatthu Annan
- Founded: 24 July 2020 (6 years ago)
- Headquarters: Bheem Hut, Thrikkannamangal, Kottarakkara P.O, Kollam, Kerala - 691506
- Ideology: Republicanism; Ambedkarism; Socialism; Secularism
- Political position: Centre-left
- Colours
- ECI status: Registered Unrecognised Party
- Seats in Rajya Sabha: 0 / 245
- Seats in Lok Sabha: 0 / 543
- Seats in Kerala Legislative Assembly: 0 / 140

Election symbol
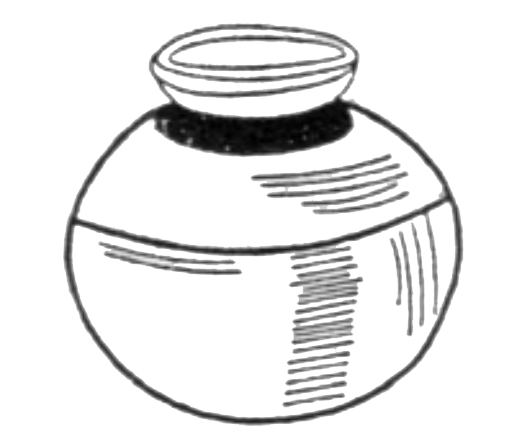

Party flag
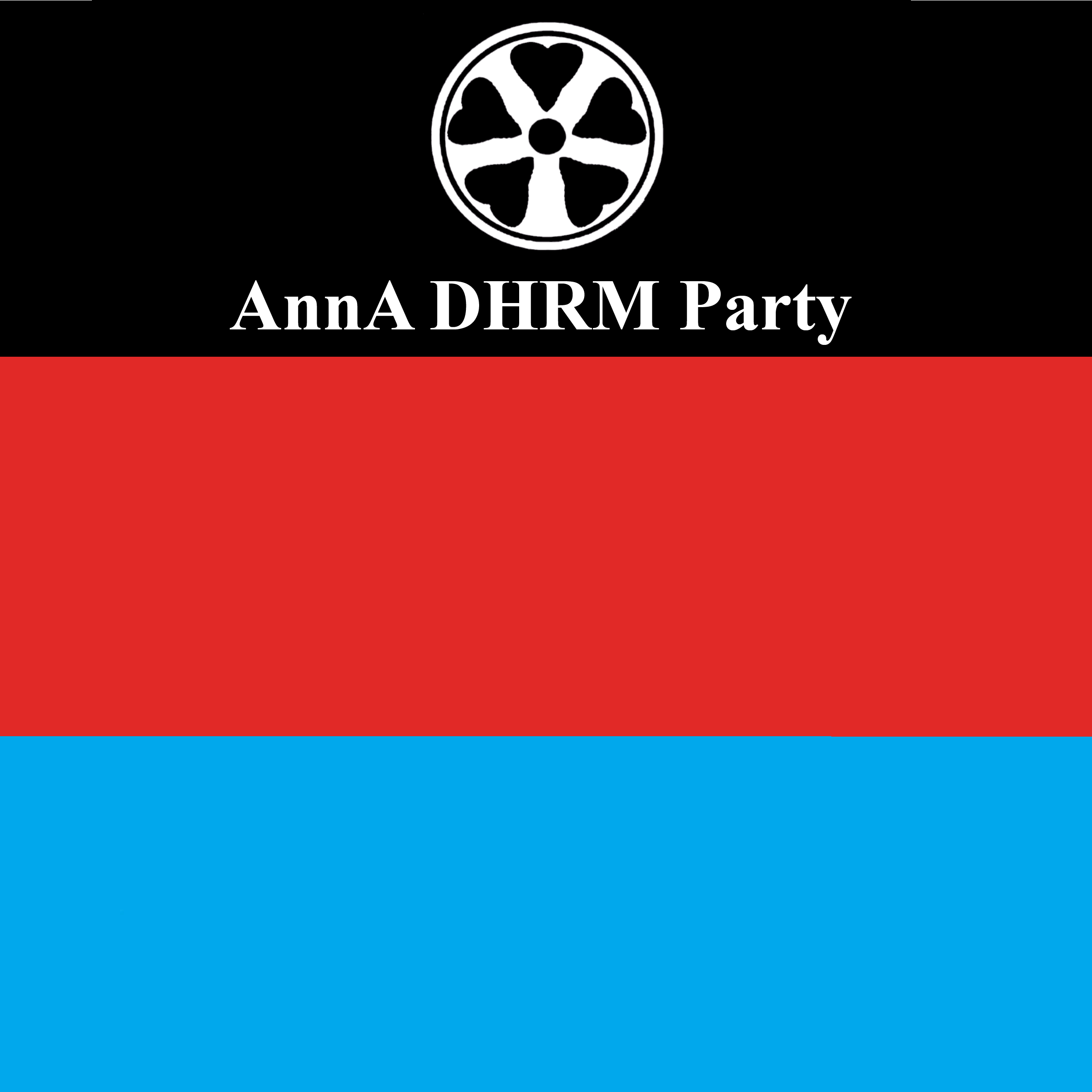

Website
- https://annadhrmparty.org/

The Anna Democratic Human Rights Movement Party of India (ADHRMPI) is a political party in India.

== Electoral performance ==
In the 2021 Kerala Legislative Assembly election, AnnA DHRM Party contested in 20 seats (out of 140) but won none

Kerala Legislative Assembly election results
Election Year	Seats contested	Seats won	Total Votes	Percentage of votes	+/- Vote
2021	20	0 / 140	5,881	0.03%	New
