= A. Subba Rao (politician) =

Indian politician

A. Subba Rao (October 1919 – 14 September 2003) was an Indian politician and leader of Communist Party of India. He was former minister for Irrigation in Kerala from 25 January 1980 to 20 October 1981. He represented Manjeshwar constituency in 6th and 7th Kerala Legislative Assembly. He was member in Rajya sabha from 1958 to 1964.
