= Kadambar =

- village
- Location in Kerala, India Kadambar (India)
- Coordinates: 12°43′0″N 74°54′0″E
- Country: India
- State: Kerala
- District: Kasaragod
- Taluk: Manjeshwaram

Population (2011)
  - Total: 1,912

Languages
  - Official: Malayalam, English
- Time zone: UTC+5:30 (IST)
- PIN: 671323
- Vehicle registration: KL-14

Kadambar is a village in Kasaragod district in the state of Kerala, India.

== Demographics ==
As of 2011 census, Kadambar village had population of 1,912 where 915 are males and 947 are females. Average literacy of Kadambar is 85.7 % which consists of 91.7 % male literates and 80 % female literates.

== Transportation ==
Local roads have access to National Highway No.66 which connects to Mangalore in the north and Calicut in the south. The nearest railway station is Manjeshwar on Mangalore-Palakkad line. Nearest airport is Mangalore.

== Languages ==
This locality is an essentially multi-lingual region. The people speak Malayalam, Kannada, Tulu, Beary bashe and Konkani. Migrant workers also speak Hindi and Tamil languages.

== Administration ==
This village is part of Meenja Panchayath and Manjeswaram assembly constituency which is again part of Kasaragod (Lok Sabha constituency)
