= C. H. Kunhambu =

Indian politician

- സി എച്ച് കുഞ്ഞമ്പു
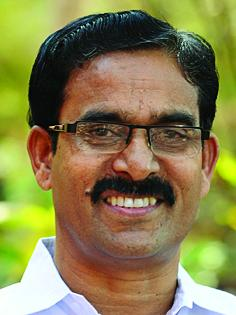

Member of the Kerala Legislative Assembly for Udma
- In office May 2021 – May 2026

Personal details
- Born: Bedadka, Kasaragod, Kerala, India.
- Party: Communist Party of India (Marxist)
- Education: Government College Kasaragod

C. H. Kunhambu (born 20 Aug 1959) is an Indian politician from Kerala who served as the MLA of Udma constituency from 2021 to 2026. He was the member of the 12th Kerala Assembly from Manjeshwar.
