= Enmakaje =

Enmakaje Perla, Kasaragod
- Village
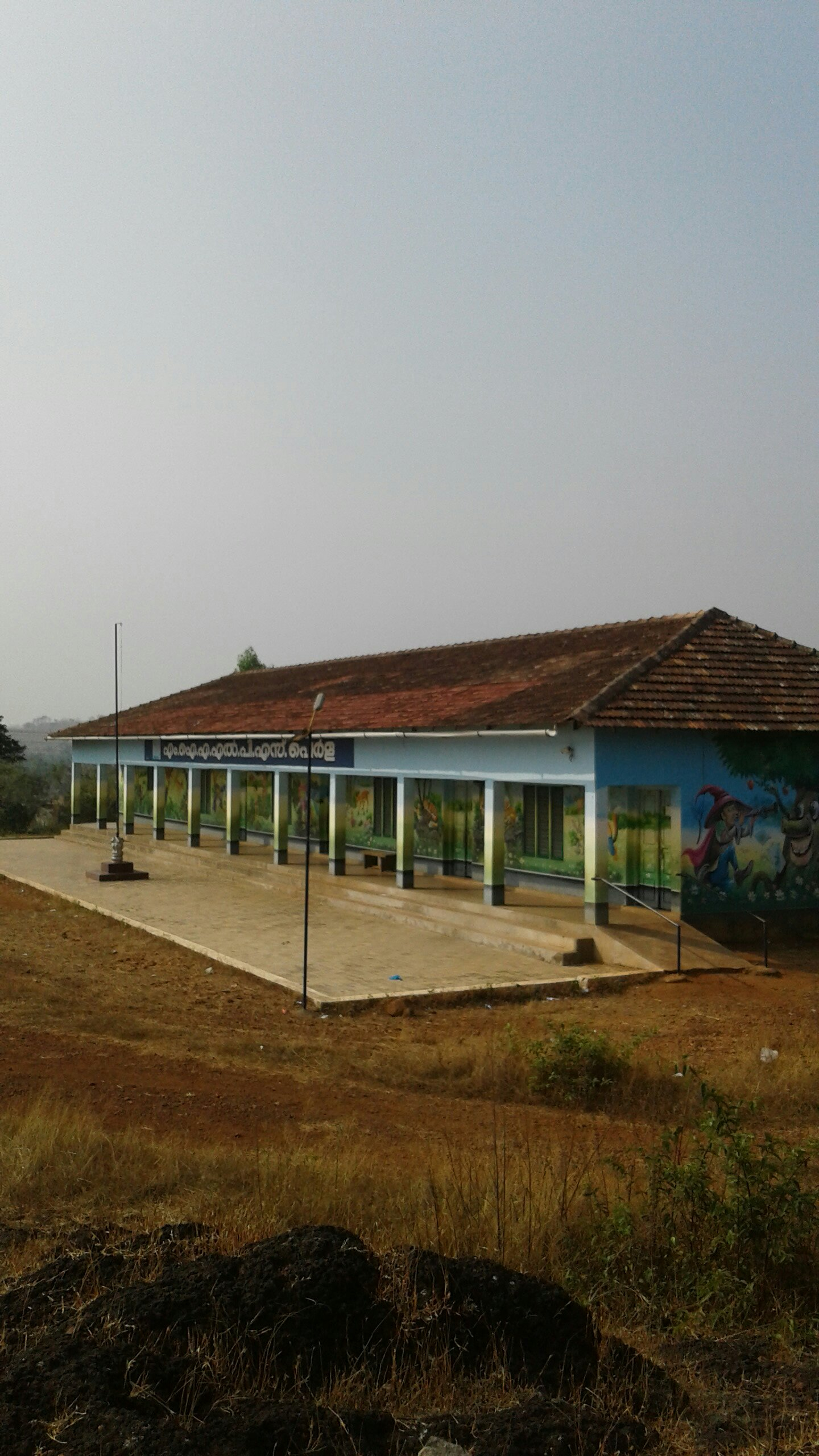
- MIALP School
- Interactive map of Enmakaje
- Coordinates: 12°39′0″N 75°4′0″E
- Country: India
- State: Kerala
- District: Kasaragod

Area
  - Total: 78.23 km^{2} (30.20 sq mi)

Population (2011)
  - Total: 12,697
  - Density: 162.3/km^{2} (420.4/sq mi)

Languages
  - Official: Malayalam, English
- Time zone: UTC+5:30 (IST)
- Postal codes: 671552 Perla
- Vehicle registration: KL- 14

Enmakaje is a village in Kasaragod district in the state of Kerala, India. The administrative capital of the village is Perla, Kasaragod.

== Demographics ==
As of 2011 India census, Enmakaje had a population of 12,697, with 6,344 males and 6,353 females.

== Transportation ==
The local roads have access to National Highway No.66, which connects to Mangalore in the north and Calicut in the south. The nearest railway station is Manjeshwar on the Mangalore-Palakkad line. There is an airport at Mangalore.

== Schools ==
- SSHSS Katukukke
- SNHS Perla
- MIALP School, Kannatikana
- Little Flower English Medium School
- GHSS Padre Vaninagar
- SSHSS SHENI

== Languages ==
It is a multi-lingual region. The people speak Malayalam, Kannada, Tulu, Beary bashe, and Konkani. Migrant workers also speak Hindi and Tamil languages. This village is part of Manjeshwaram assembly constituency which is again part of Kasaragod (Lok Sabha constituency)

== Destruction caused by pesticide ==
From 1975 onwards, the pesticide Endosulfan was used for various plantations in Enmakaje without any restrictions or control. This resulted in a huge number of deaths as well as serious injuries. Majority of the 4,000 deaths caused by Endosulfan in the Kasargode District occurred in Enmakaje. Padre village in the Enmakaje Panchayath was the most severely affected area, partly because it is surrounded on all sides by cashew nut plantations.

== See also ==
- Nadubail, an area near Enmakaje
