= Mambaram, Kannur =

Mambaram
- Town
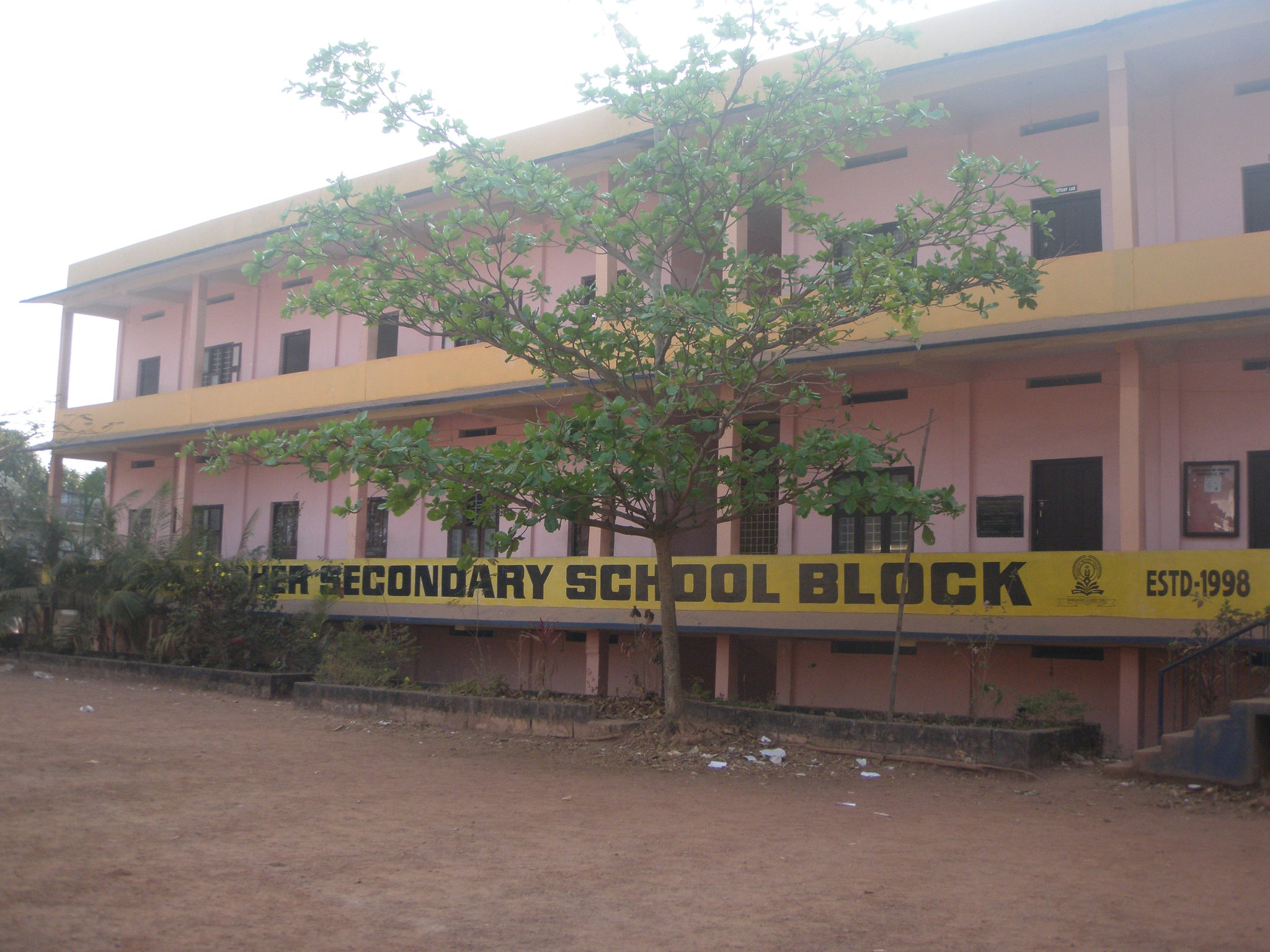
- Mambaram High School
- Interactive map of Mambaram
- Coordinates: 11.821989°N 75.511093°E
- Country: India
- State: Kerala
- District: Kannur

Government
  - Body: Vengad Grama Panchayat

Languages
  - Official: Malayalam, English
- Time zone: UTC+5:30 (IST)
- PIN: 670741
- Telephone code: +91-0490
- ISO 3166 code: IN-KL
- Vehicle registration: KL-13 KL-58
- Assembly constituency: Dhamrmadam
- Lok Sabha constituency: Kannur

Mambaram is a town in Vengad grama panchayat, situated on the banks of Anjarakandi River in Kannur district, Kerala state, India. It is located on State Highway 38 about 17 km (11 mi) southeast of the district headquarters Kannur and 7 km (4.3 mi) west of Kuthuparamba.

Education institutions in the town include Mambaram Higher Secondary School, Mambaram English Medium School, Indira Gandhi College of Science & Technology, Indira Gandhi Public School.

Mambaram is home to the Arathil Bhagavathi Temple, a highly revered shrine dedicated to Goddess Bhagavathi. The annual Thira festival is celebrated in this temple and attracts thousands of devotees.

== Transport ==
Mambaram is easily accessible by local buses from Kannur and Thalassery. Kozhikode is about 77 km away. The nearest bus station is at Kuthuparamba. Thalassery Railway Station serves this area. kannur Airport is the nearest airport. Mattannur {new airport} is 20 km from this town. The Peralassery A.K.G's native place is 3 km from this town. Pinarayi:Parapram is ~3–5 km from this town.

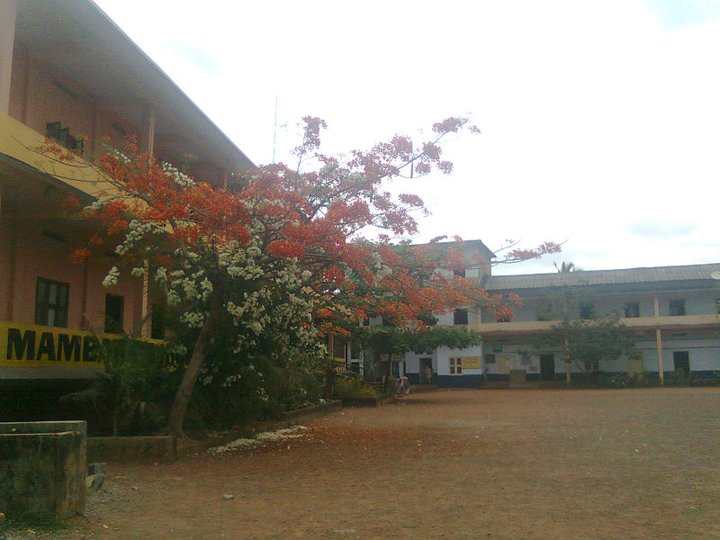
Mambaram HSS

After the opening of Kannur airport in December 2018, the nearest airport now is Kannur airport which is about 17 km.

== Education ==
Mambaram Higher Secondary School (MHSS) and Mambaram English Medium School (MEMS) promoted by Mr. Mambaram P. Madhavan are located 10 km from Thalassery and 20 km from Kannur.

Mambaram Higher Secondary School was founded in 1983. Principal Mr. C.V. Thilakaraj of MHSS won the President of India's medal for honorary services in 2005. The school celebrated its Silver Jubilee year in 2008. Winner of many district, state and national awards for arts, cultural & science competitions, the school has transformed itself to a well renowned name in school education in Kerala state now. It was considered the state's best school in Kerala Sastrolsavam for many years.

On 9 January 2008 Kerala State Governor, R.L. Bhatia inaugurated the Silver Jubilee celebrations. Kannur MP Mr. A. P. Abdullakutty, MLA Mr. K. C. Venugopal, District Collector Ms. Ishita Roy etc. presided over the function.

Mambaram English Medium School (CBSE) was founded in 1991 and is located on the Kuthuparamba Road. This is the first CBSE affiliated school in the area and also the largest Mr. R.K. Krishnan Nambiar famous educationalist, was the first principal.

Indiragandhi College of Science and Technology (IIST) and Indira Gandhi Public School are promoted by Mr. Mambaram Divakaran.

Indira Gandhi Public School Situated in Thalassery road, this is another school situated in Mambaram Town. There is also a well maintained students park in shore of the Mambaram River & beneath to the Indira Gandhi Public School.

Mambaram UP School

Mambaram Upper Primary School was established in 1915. The school consists of Grades from 1 through 7.

== Other Establishments ==
- BSNL office
- Post office
- Syndicate Bank
- District co op bank
- Kuthuparamb co op bank mambaram branch
- Pathiriyad co op bank mambaram branch
- North Malabar Gramin bank
- Daffodils Kindergarten
- Mambaram Children's Park
- Mambaram Juma Masjid
- Mambaram Darul irshad Secondary madrassa
- South Indian Bank

== See also ==
- Kannavam
- Pinarayi
- Mavilayi
- Thrippangottur
- Mattanur
- Kannur
- Iritty
- Mangattidam
- Pathiriyad
- Manantheri
- Cheruvanchery
