= Anjarakandi River =

Anjarakandi River Ancharakandy River
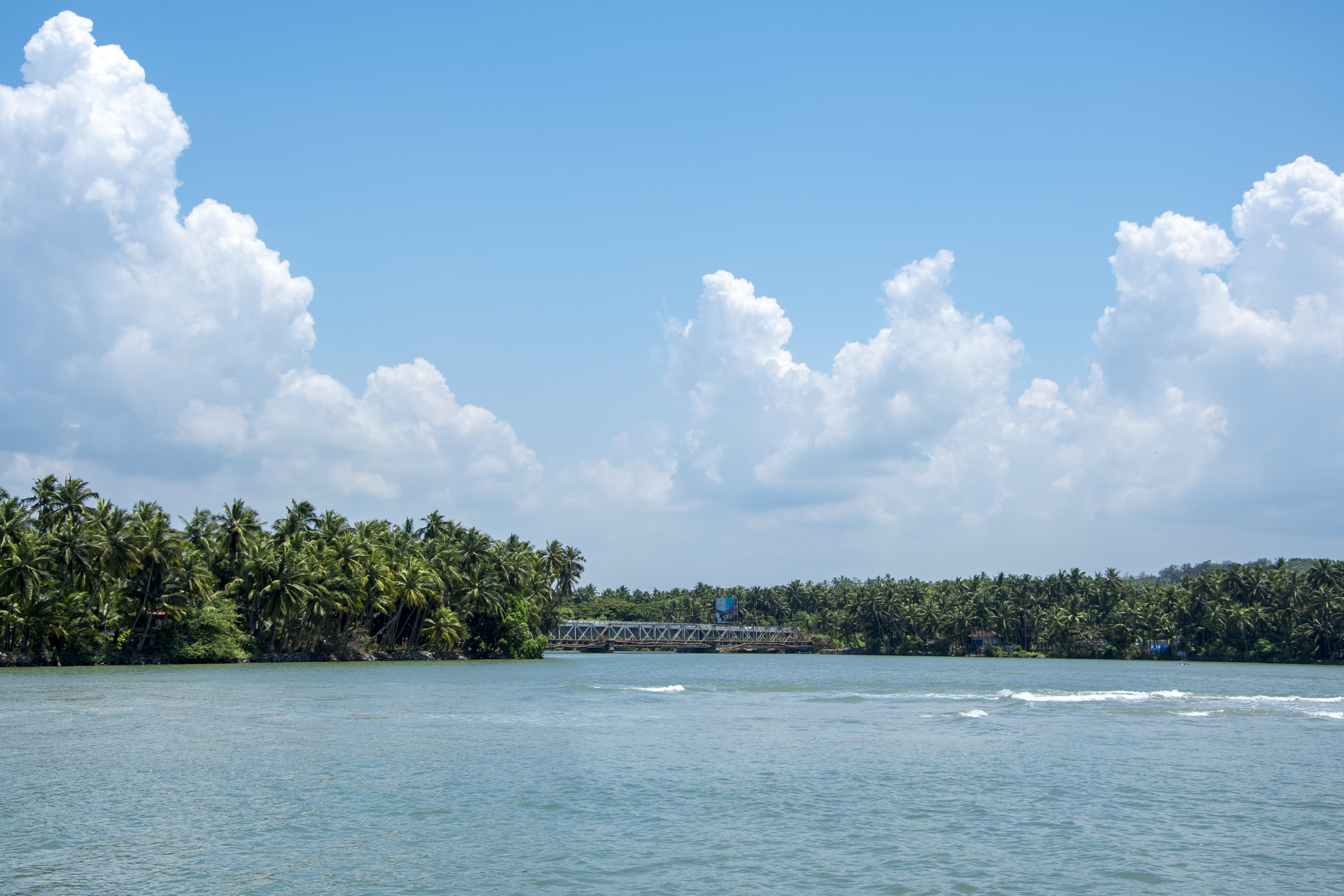
- Anjarakandi River

- Location within Kerala

Location
- Country: India
- State: Kerala
- District: Kannur
- Towns: Dharmadom, Ancharakandy, Peralasseri, Mambaram, Keezhallur

Physical characteristics
- Source: Kannoth Reserve Forest/Kannavam Hills
  - location: Kannur - Wayanad border, Kerala, India
  - coordinates: 11°50′35″N 75°40′30″E
  - elevation: 600 m (2,000 ft)
- Mouth
  - location: Muzhappilangad in Arabian Sea
  - coordinates: 11°46′42″N 75°27′18″E
- Length: 48 km (30 mi)

The Anjarakandi River is one of the 41 west-flowing rivers in Kerala, India. It flows through the Thalassery taluk in Kannur district. The river originates in the Kannoth Reserve Forest on the slopes of the Western Ghats, on the border of Wayanad and Kannur districts. The 48 km long river flows in the western direction emptying into the Arabian Sea at Dharmadom.

== Course ==
The Anjarakandy river originates in the slopes of the Western Ghats at the border of the Wayanad and Kannur districts. The river then flows through the hilly towns of Nedumpoyil, Kannavam, Cheruvanchery, Manantheri, Kandamkunnu, Chittaripparamba and Vengoor. Many minor tributaries like Mattanur river and Peravoor river joins the Anjarakandy at this region. Then the river plunges out of the hilly terrain into the Malabar plains. It then passes through Keezhalloor, Paduvilayi, Anjarakandy, Peralassery, Keezhattur, Mambaram and Palayad. At reaching Dharmadom the river empties into the Arabian Sea.

== Name ==
The river Anjarakandy is flowing through the Anjarakandy village of Kannur district. This place is prominent for its Cinnamon estate.

== Gallery ==
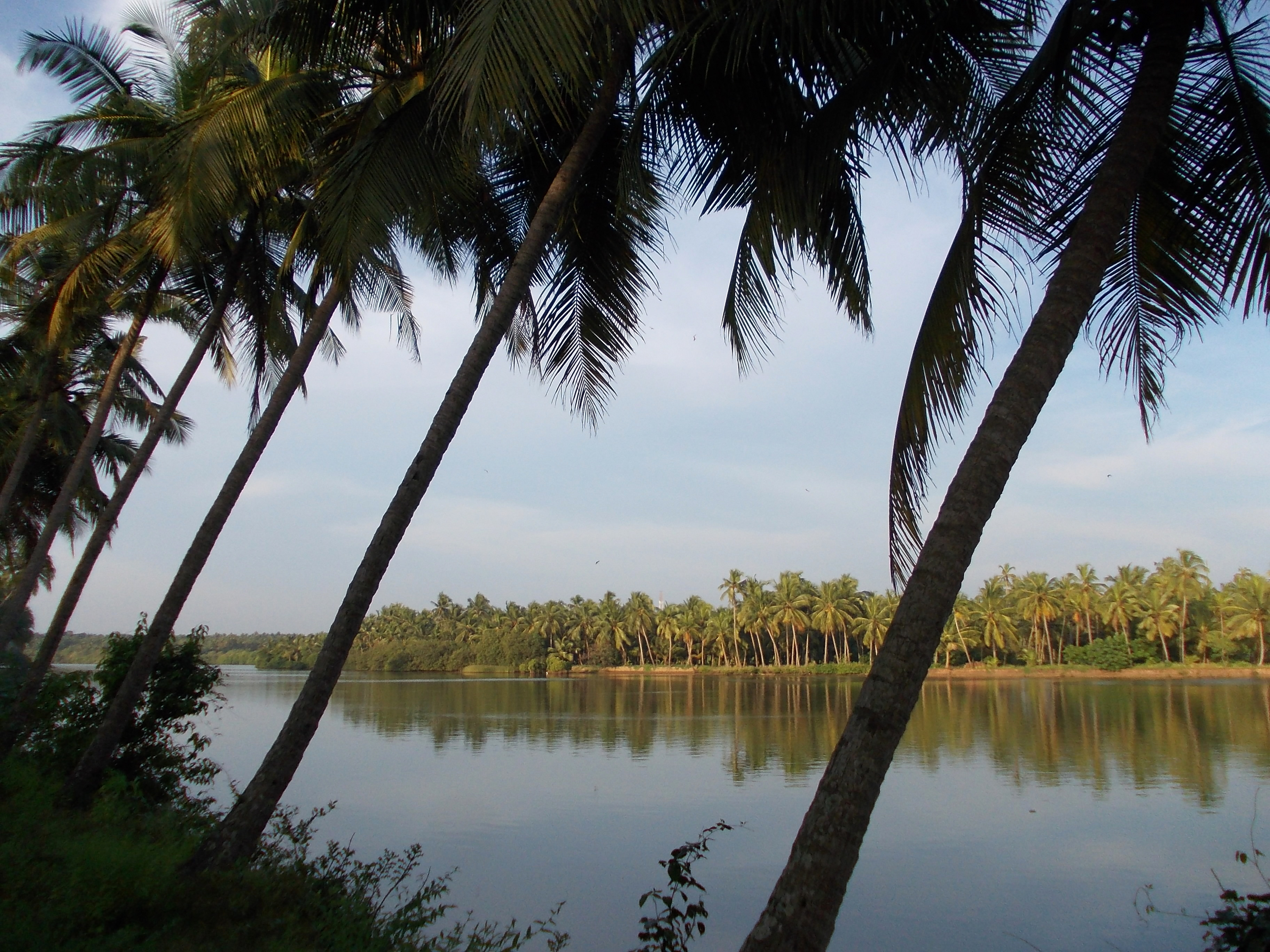

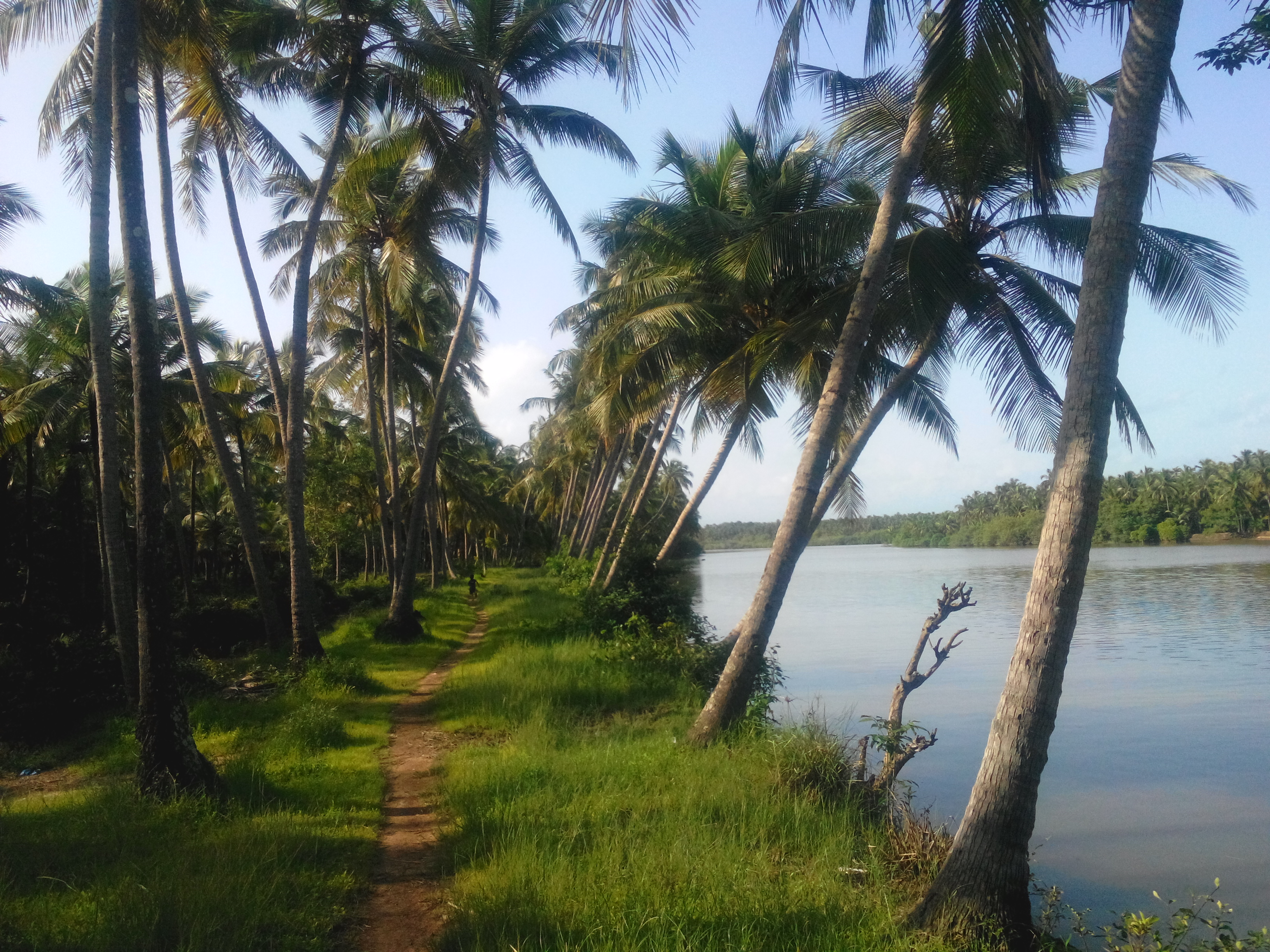

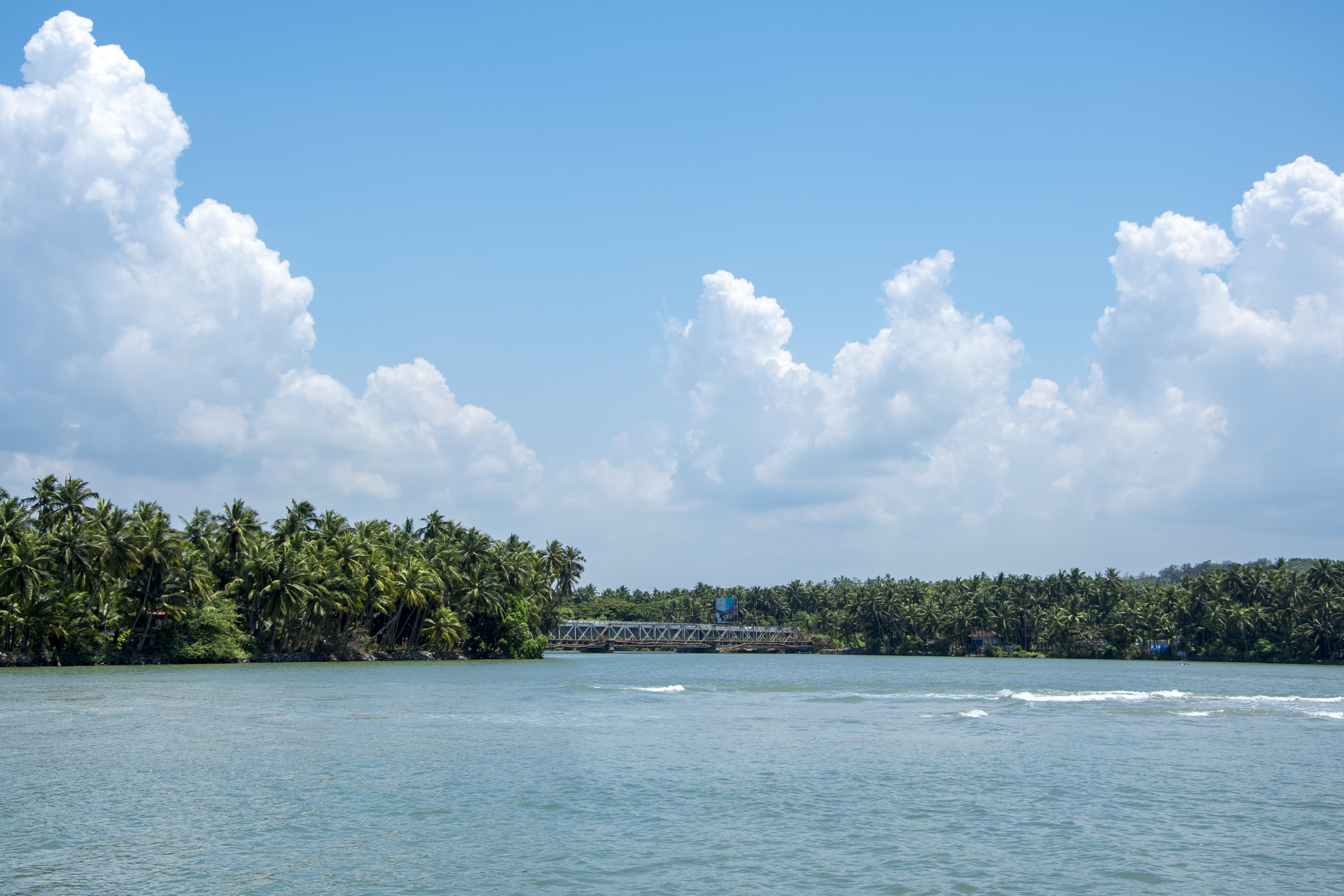
Basin

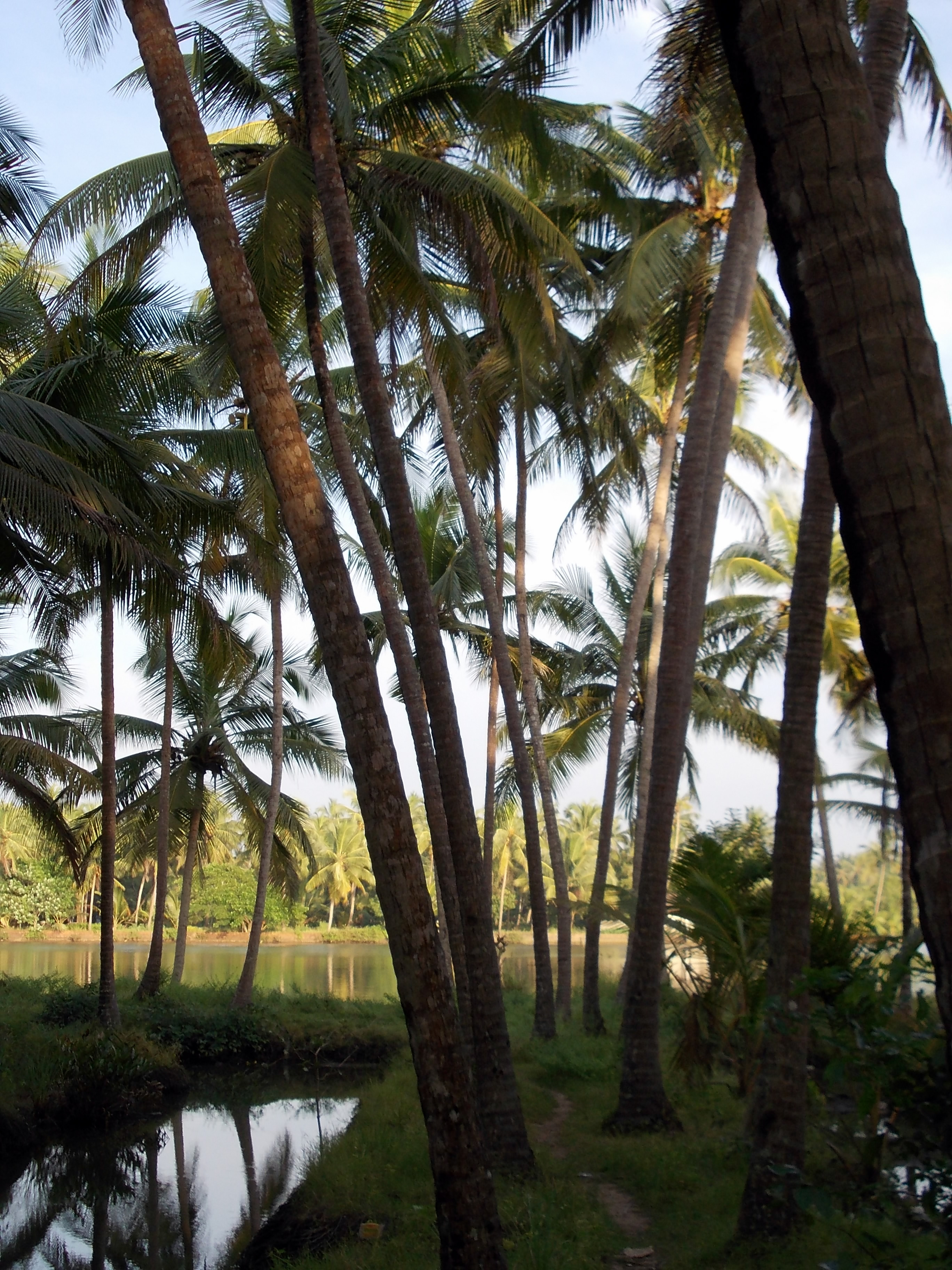

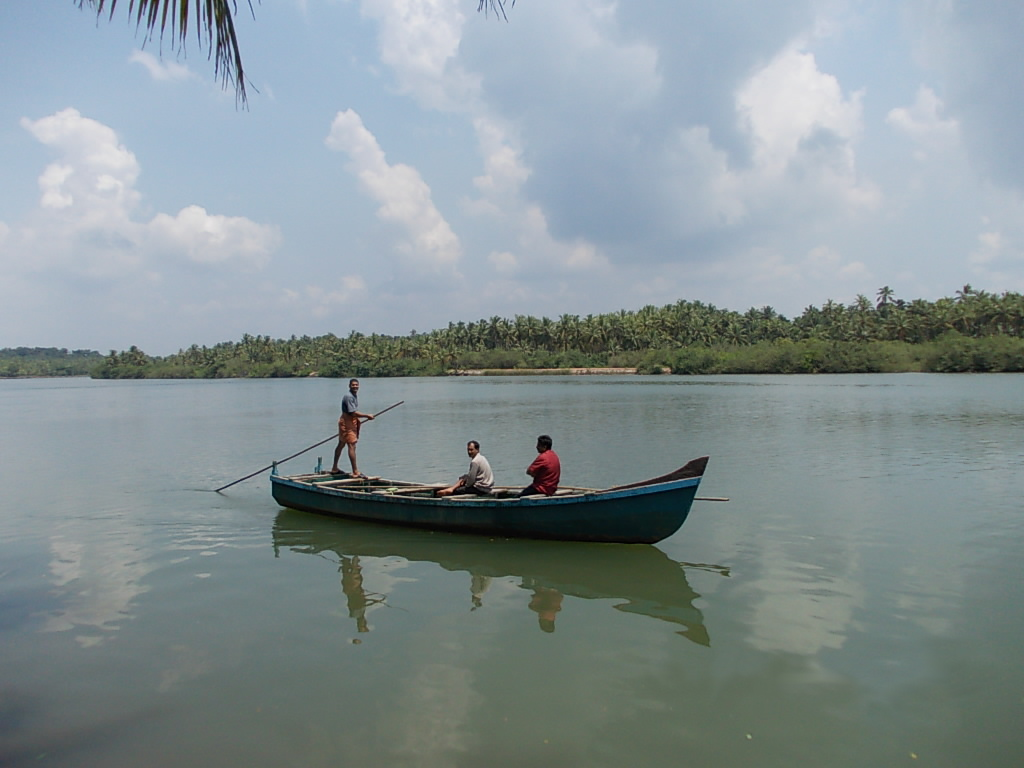
