= Kuthuparamba =

Kuthuparamba Koothuparamba
- Municipality
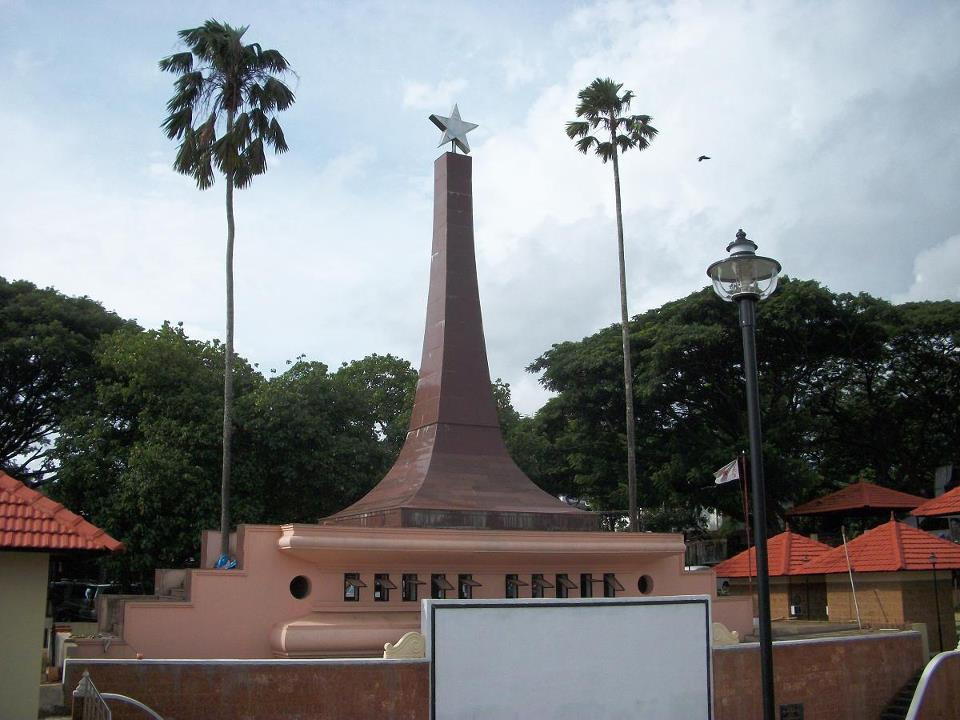
- Kuthuparamba Martyr's Memorial

- Location in Kerala, India Kuthuparamba (India)
- Coordinates: 11.83°N 75.58°E
- Country: India
- State: Kerala
- District: Kannur
- Taluk: Thalassery
- Municipality: 1990

Government
  - Type: Municipal Council
  - Body: Kuthuparamba Municipality
  - Municipal Chairman: V.Shijith
  - MLA: P. K. Praveen
  - Assistant Commissioner of Police: Pradeepan Kannipoyil

Area
  - Total: 16.76 km^{2} (6.47 sq mi)
- Elevation: 38 m (125 ft)

Population (2011)
  - Total: 29,619
  - Density: 1,767/km^{2} (4,577/sq mi)

Languages
  - Official: Malayalam, English
- Time zone: UTC+5:30 (IST)
- PIN: 670643
- ISO 3166 code: IN-KL
- Vehicle registration: KL 58
- Sex ratio: 1187 ♂/♀
- Literacy: 96.8%
- Lok Sabha constituency: Vatakara
- Assembly constituency: Kuthuparamba
- Climate: pleasant (Köppen)

Kuthuparamba or Koothuparamba is a municipality situated in the midland region of Kannur district, Kerala, India. It is located about 24 km southeast of Kannur and 14 km northeast of Thalassery.

== Administration ==
Kuthuparamba Municipality is a part of Kuthuparamba Assembly constituency under Vatakara Lok Sabha constituency.

=== Municipal wards ===
The town is administered by Kuthuparamba Municipality, headed by a chairman. For administrative purposes, the town is divided into 29 wards. The ruling party is CPI(M) with V. Shijith as the municipal chairman.

Ward no.	Name	Ward no.	Name
1	Vakkummal	2	Chorakkulam
3	Nirmalagiri	4	Palaparamba
5	Noonjumbayi	6	Adiyarappara
7	Mooriyad north	8	Mooriyad east
9	Punchakkalayi	10	Koluthuparamba
11	Mooriyad central	12	Naravoor south
13	Kuttikkad	14	Town
15	Kakkad	16	Naravoor central
17	Naravoor east	18	Thrikkannapuram
19	Thrikkannapuram south	20	Thrikkannapuram west
21	Paral	22	Pookode
23	Naravoor	24	Valiyapara
25	Elippattachira	26	Moolakkulam
27	Pazhayanirath	28	Panniyora
29	Edayilpeedika		

== Law and order ==
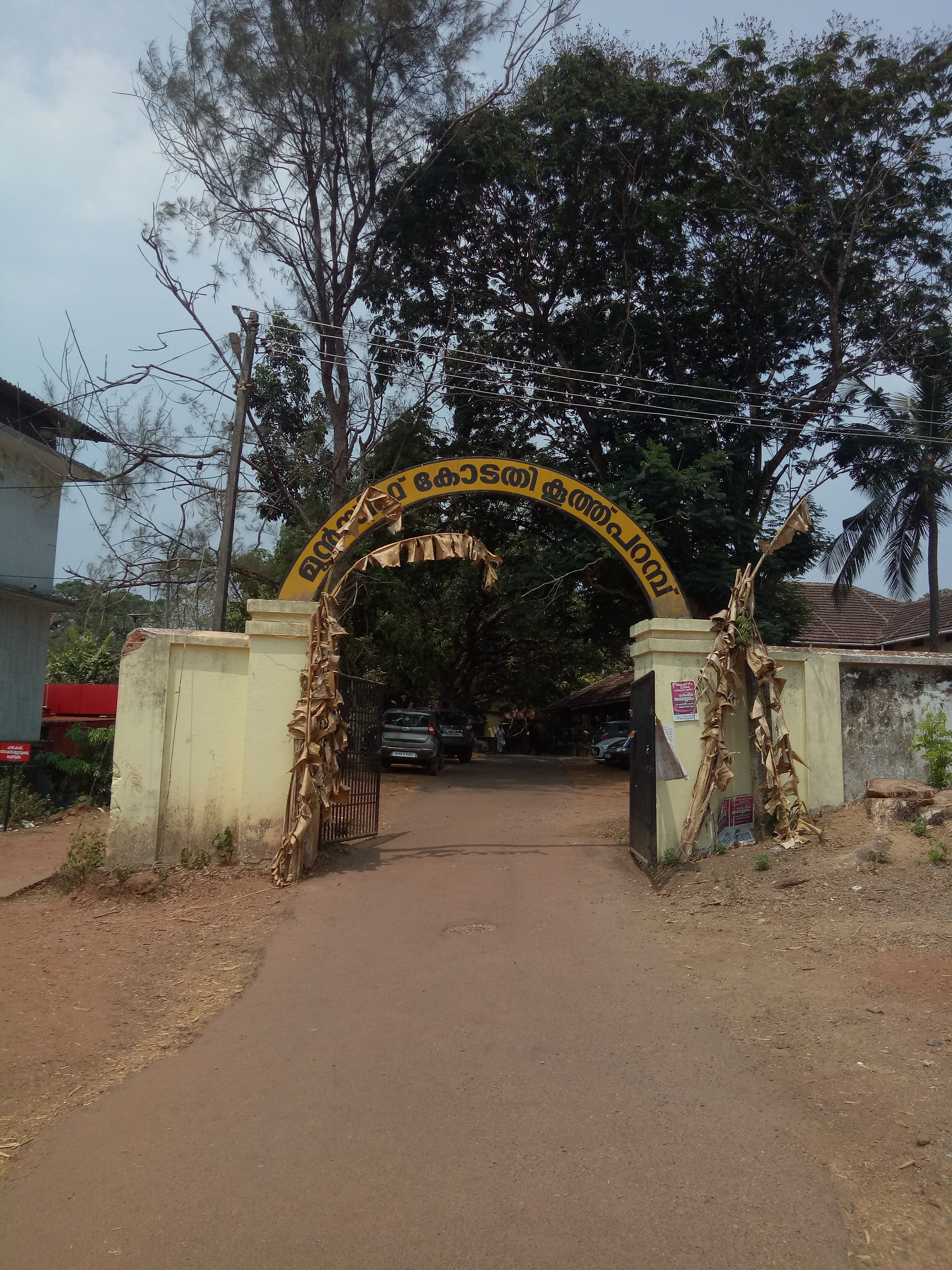
Munsiff Court, Kuthuparamba

The municipality comes under jurisdiction of Kuthuparamba Police Station, which was formed in 1871. The station limit is 72.68 km² covering five villages, Kuthuparamba, Paduvilayi, Pathiriyad, Kandamkunnu and Mangattidam, which includes Kuthuparamba municipality and panchayats like Vengad and Mangattidom.

Kuthuparamba is one of the three police sub-divisions in Kannur city formed on February 18, 2021. Kuthuparamba sub-division comprises six police stations, Kuthuparamba, Mattanur, Mattanur Airport, Kolavelloor, Panoor and Kannavam, with an area of 433.09 km^{2}, which are politically sensitive areas.

Kuthuparamba has a special sub-jail which is a renovation of the old sub-jail building established since British rule in 1871.

Court complexes in Kuthuparamba

- Judicial First Class Majistrate Court, Kuthuparamba
- Munsiff Court, Kuthuparamba

== Demographics ==
As of the 2011 Census, Kuthuparamba Municipality with an area of 16.76 square kilometres (6.47 sq mi) had a population of 29,619. Kuthuparamba was the third most densely populated municipal town in Kannur district. Males constituted 45.4% of the population and females 54.6%. Kuthuparamba had an average literacy rate of 96.76%, higher than the national urban average of 79% and state average of 94%: male literacy was 98.1%, and female literacy was 95.6%. In Kuthuparamba, 10.5% of the population was under 6 years of age.

== History ==
Kuthuparamba was part of Kottayam dynasty under the reign of Pazhassi Raja in the midievel period. Since the British captured Kuthuparamba area, the area fell under British rule was formed as Kottayam taluk. Thalassery – Coorg road which was made by the British for sending troops to Mysore also plays an important role in the history of Kuthuparamba. Kottayam dynasty had given much importance to the fine arts of Kathakali and Chakyar Koothu.

It is believed that the name Kuthuparamba was derived from the words 'Koothu' and 'Paramba' (the ground where the Koothu was performed). This name was given to the complete area by British military, there was a cantonment and was known as Kuthuparamba cantonment. The remnants of history are still alive in the structure like court complex, inspection bungalow, and maroli ghat.

Kuthuparamba was formed as Panchayat in the year 1939 by fixing Kuthuparamba revenue village as its boundary. The first president of the panchayat was Dr. C. Kumaran. Kuthuparamba was established as a municipality on April 1, 1990.

== Religion ==
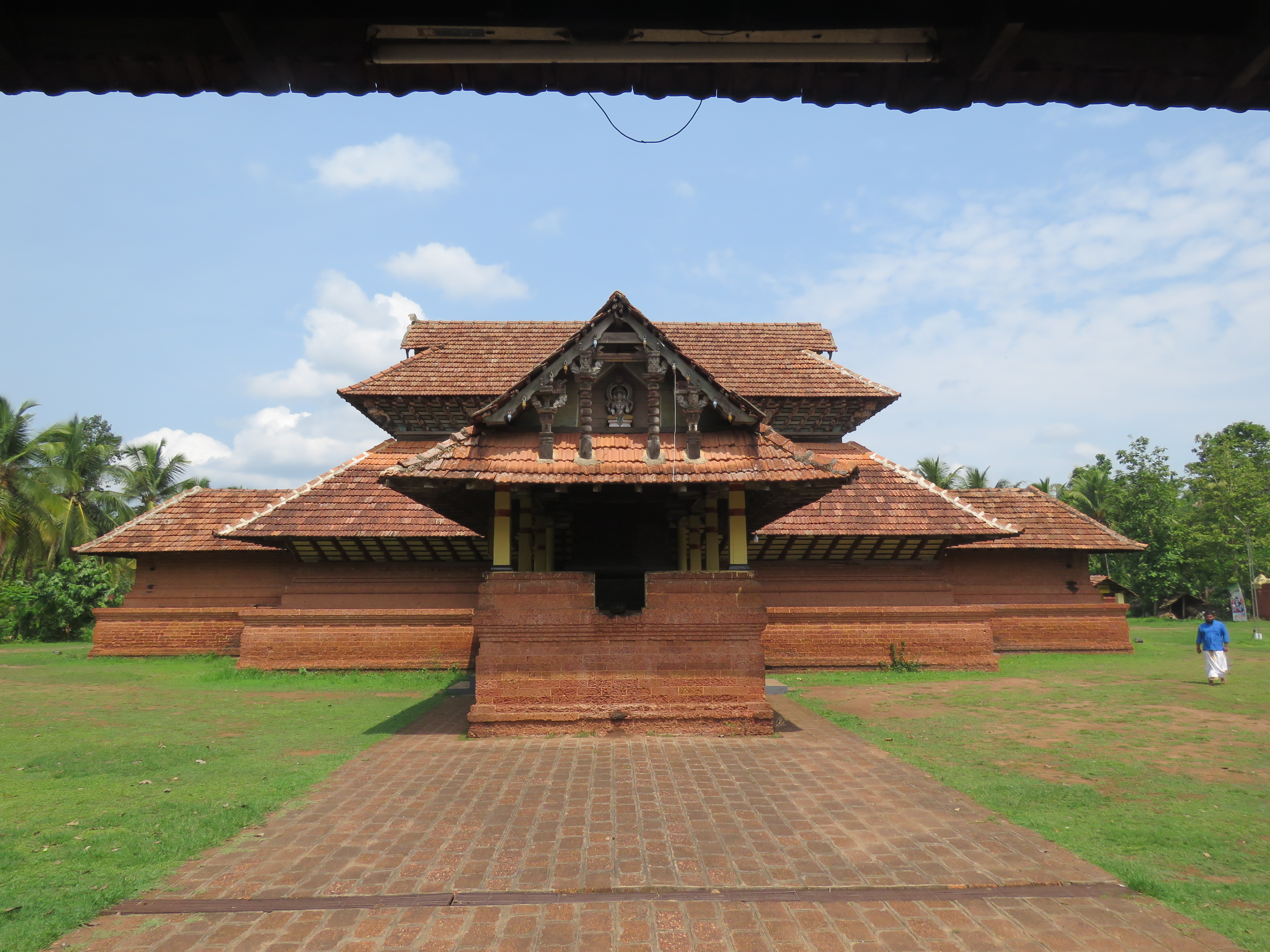
Thrikkaikunnu Mahadeva Temple

As of the 2011 India census, Kuthuparamba Municipality had a total population of 29,619, of whom 68.98% were Hindus, 28.94% Muslims, 1.94% Christians and 0.14% others. One of the 13 shakteya temples in Kerala, Thiruvancheri Kavu, is located near Kuthuparamba.

== Educational institutions ==
=== Colleges ===
- Nirmalagiri College, Kuthuparamba
- College of Applied Science, Kuthuparamba
- MG College, Kuthuparamba
- MES College, Naravoor
- Government ITI, Kuthuparamba

=== Schools ===
- Amrita Vidyalayam, Pookode, Kuthuparamba
- Government Higher Secondary School, Kuthuparamba
- Kuthuparamba UP School
- Rani Jai Higher Secondary School, Nirmalagiri
- South Kuthuparamba U P School
- Sree Narayana English Medium High School, Mangattidam, Kuthuparamba

== Healthcare ==
There are three main hospitals in Kuthuparamba. One in government sector, one in private sector and one in co-operative sector.

Kuthuparamba Government Taluk Hospital is the main government hospital in the town, with an average daily outpatient attendance of 1,200 to 1,500. Its 12-storey multi-speciality block, constructed at a cost of ₹59.23 crore with 171 beds, four operation theatres and 12 outpatient departments, was inaugurated in November 2025.

Christu Raj Hospital is a private hospital located at Thokkilangadi in the Kuthuparamba municipal area, situated along the State Highway 30. Established in 1983 and run by the Sisters of the Sacred Heart of Thalassery Province, it is a 100-bedded multi-specialty hospital with a nursing school since 2002.

Kuthuparamba Co-operative Hospital is a co-operative sector hospital located near the Government Taluk Hospital, providing primary and secondary healthcare services.

== Industrial growth centre ==
Kannur Industrial Growth Centre is located in Valiyavelicham near Kuthuparamba. It is one of the three IGCs in the state under Kerala Industrial Infrastructure Development Corporation (KSIDC).

Kannur IGC has well-developed infrastructure facilities, including power, water, and roads, facilitating setting up of solid waste/plastic recycling and processing units by interested entrepreneurs. A plastic recycling unit is operating in the Kannur IGC. Similarly, the KSIDC has allocated land for two recycling units and biomedical waste treatment unit, which are being set up.

Also, Kerala Agro Machinery Corporation Ltd (KAMCO) is located at Valiyavelicham, which facilitates setting up of power tiller manufacturing units. The products manufactured by the unit include new generation power tillers with self-starter, garden tiller and brush cutter with diesel engine.

== Linkage and connectivity ==
Kuthuparamba town is a major junction connected by two state highways and a major district road to Wayanad. Thalassery is the nearest railway station, 14 km (8.7 mi) away from the town. Kannur international airport is located 15 km (9.3 mi) away from the town.

There are two state highways passing through the town, SH-30 (Thalassery – Coorg inter-state highway) and SH-38 (Kannur – Kozhikode road). These act as major corridors of the town and possess good connectivity. Considerable volume of traffic from Karnataka passes through the town. In addition to this, other district roads and municipal roads exist within the town.

The Kuthuparamba Ring Road is a proposed 5.565 km road project intended to reduce traffic congestion in the town centre. The proposed road will bypass the town by connecting Kuttikkunnu–Ambilad–Purakkalam–Pazhayanirath, providing direct connectivity from Thalassery and Kannur towards Kannur International Airport, Mattannur and Wayanad. The project is divided into two phases: the first phase, a 1.5 km stretch connecting Pazhayanirath and Purakkalam Bombay hotel junction, has been completed, while the second phase, a 4.065 km stretch from Kuttikunnu to Purakkalam via Ambilad, is currently under construction.

== Koothuparamba Police firing ==
The Koothuparamba Police firing was an incident that took place in Koothuparamba on November 25, 1994. Police opened fire on DYFI protestors who protested against commoditisation and privatisation of education policy by the UDF government led by the Congress. Police resorted to firing when the protesters blocked minister M.V. Raghavan, who was in town to inaugurate an event.

== Notable people ==
- Ramesh Narayan, artist
- Sreenivasan, filmmaker
- Dhyan Sreenivasan, filmmaker
- Vineeth Sreenivasan, filmmaker
- K.G. Subramanyan, artist
- Vagbhatananda, social reformer
- V. K. Sanoj, Indian politician
- Ubaid Chono Kadavath, Indian footballer

== Political violence ==
This area is an epicenter of political violence between the Communist Party of India (Marxist) (CPI(M)) and the Rashtriya Swayamsevak Sangh (RSS), who have been fighting in this area for supremacy for the last 50 years. Clashes in 2008 left seven people dead and many injured. The High Court of Kerala called this manslaughter a "compelling sport" and suggested permanent deployment of Central forces in the affected areas.

== Transportation ==
Thalassery is the nearest railway station, 14 km from the town. Kuthuparamba is a town en route Thalassery-Coorg (SH30) road (commonly known as TC Road). The nearest airport is Kannur International Airport, which is 15 km away. It has road connectivity with major tourist attractions like Aralam, Mysore, Mangalore, Ooty, and Bangalore.

== Political parties ==
- Indian Union Muslim League
- Rashtriya Janata Dal
- Communist Party of India (Marxist)
- Communist Party of India
- Indian National Congress
- Bharatiya Janata Party
- Aam Aadmi Party (AAP)
- Janata Dal (Secular)
- Indian National League (INL)

== See also ==
- Kannavam
- Kolayad
- Pinarayi
- Mavilayi
- Thrippangottur
- Peravoor
- Kottayam-Malabar
- Mangattidam
- Pathiriyad
- Manantheri
- Cheruvanchery
- Mambram
- Kadamkunnu
- Nirmalagiri
