= Pinarayi =

- Census Town
- Location in Kerala, India Pinarayi (India)
- Coordinates: 11.821782°N 75.497288°E
- Country: India
- State: Kerala
- District: Kannur
- Taluk: Thalassery

Government
  - Type: Panchayati raj (India)
  - Body: Pinarayi Grama Panchayat
  - President: K. K. Rajeevan

Area
  - Total: 9.63 km^{2} (3.72 sq mi)

Population (2011)
  - Total: 16,801
  - Density: 1,740/km^{2} (4,520/sq mi)

Languages
  - Official: Malayalam, English
- Time zone: UTC+5:30 (IST)
- PIN: 670741
- Telephone code: 0490-382454
- ISO 3166 code: IN-KL
- Vehicle registration: KL 58 KL 13
- Sex ratio: 1000M/1047F ♂/♀
- Lok Sabha Constituency: Kannur
- Vidhan Sabha Constituency: Dharmadam

Pinarayi is a census town in Kannur district in the Indian state of Kerala.

== Geography ==
Pinarayi is 18 kilometres (11 mi) from the district headquarters Kannur. The nearest town and railway station is Thalassery which is 9 km (5.6 mi) away. The village is surrounded by rivers on three sides, and the remaining boundaries consist of five panchayats: Kadirur, Dharmadom, Peralasseri, Vengad, Kottayam and Eranholi. The Arabian Sea is just 5 km (3.1 mi) away. For administrational purposes the panchayat is divided into two villages Eruvatti and Pinarayi. Pinarayi consists of 19 wards and almost all wards contains one or more primary schools.

== History ==
In the 1920s peasant and teachers organizations were strong in this village and there was widespread support for the freedom movement. As a part of the independence struggle, a boycott of foreign clothes was conducted in 1930, its leaders being AKG, AK Sankaran Nambiar, Kacherikkandi Chathukkutty and Thattari Kunhiraman. In 1938, seven thousand peasants marched from Pinarayi to Kottayam Kovilakam for reducing varam and pattam (rent paid by peasants to landlords). The population of Pinarayi during that time was around 10,000. This was considered as the first instance of unified mass movement against landlordism. NE Balaram, NE Nanu, AK Gopalan, Kundancheri Kunhiraman master, Pandyala Gopalan Master, Pinarayi Krishnan master and TV Govindan Nair were the leaders.

Pinarayi is considered as a CPI(M) bastion after the division of CPI in 1964, and the first conference of the Communist party of India in present day Kerala was held at a place called Paraparam in Pinarayi and communist party formally constituted in this meeting. Pinarayi Vijayan, the former Chief Minister of Kerala and the former State Secretary of Communist Party of India (Marxist) is a native of this village, and he is usually simply referred to by his village name Pinarayi.

== Panchayat Presidents ==
- 1957-1961: Krishnan P. M. (un-united Pinarayi)
- 1961-1964: Kunhukutty Master
- 1964-1967: T. V. Achuthan Nair
- 1967-1979: P. Nanu
- 1979-1994: Pandyala Gopalan Master
- 1995-2005: Kakkoth Rajan
- 2005-2010: V. Leela
- 2010-2015: Konki Raveendran
- 2015-2020: Geethamma
- From 2020: K. K. Rajeevan

== Education ==
Pinarayi has had primary education for more than 150 years.

Kulathumkara village school that was established in the 1840s by Therela Kannan Gurikkal was later renamed as Therala lower primary school. However, in 1992 the Kerala state government closed the school arguing that it was uneconomic.

The Roman Catholic Amala Basic UP school was founded in 1919 by a missionary by the name of Fernandes, the first school in the village to provide English-medium education, drawing students also from neighbouring villages.

On 10 June 1977 a high school was inaugurated at Pinarayi in the memory of the communist leader AKG. Its campus has an area of 3.15 acres (12,700 m^{2}). Later this school was upgraded to higher secondary. High school and higher secondary studies are offered mainly by the A.K.G Memorial Higher secondary school. With the exception of this high school all the other schools were established in first part of 19th century. In total there are 9 lower primary schools and 6 upper primary schools and all these are under private management. There is a Government Industrial Training Institute (ITI) maintained by Government of Kerala. A computer training facility is offered by the Pinarayi Electronics Industrial co-operative society (PELISO).

== Economy ==
The main occupation is Beedi manufacturing in which the co-operative society Dinesh has a monopoly. Pinarayi is an industrially backward village. Modern industrial establishments are not there.

Electricity reached this village in 1958 and was inaugurated by the then Electricity Minister of Kerala VR Krishna Iyer.

== Co-operative societies ==
But Co-operative sector is very strong and it compensated to industrial backwardness to an extent. This village is considered to be having the highest number of Co-operative societies. Around 35 co-operative societies are there in this village. First co-operative society of this village was started in 1922. Totally there are 3 credit societies, 16 industrial co-operative societies, 6 school co-operative societies and 2 others. Peoples are the ultimate decision makers and investors in these societies. These societies are providing service in almost every aspect of life like banking, education, printing, milk and public distributions, garments manufacturing, hotels, health care, recreations, markets and stores, manufacturing, Information Technology etc. Pinarayi Service co-operative bank, Pinarayi Industrial co-operative society, Pinarayi beedi workers Industrial co-operative society (DINESH), Pinarayi women's multi Industrial co-operative society are leading co-operative societies. More than 2000 peoples are working in beedi manufacturing sector. Pole casting unit in Pinarayi Industrial co-operative society manufactures 7m, 8m and 9m pre stressed concrete poles and supplies to Kerala State Electricity Board for using in the construction of distribution lines.

== Peoples Planning Programme ==
Peoples Planning Programme revolutionized the development of the Panchayat. Pinarayi grama panchayat was chosen as the best panchayat in the district. Its grama sabha meetings registered a consistently high attendance, its 121 neighborhood committees have been active, it has achieved a 100% revenue and tax collection record. It has been particularly successful in the implementation of its total sanitation programme whereby 2,500 houses have been provided with private latrines.

== Demographics ==
As of 2011 Census, Pinarayi had a population of 16,801 where males constitute 46.3% of the population and females 53.7%. Pinarayi census town spreads over an area of 9.63 km^{2} (3.72 sq mi) with 3,922 families residing in it. The male female sex ratio was 1,158 higher than state average of 1,084. Pinarayi had an average literacy rate of 97.4%, higher than the national average of 59.5%: male literacy is 98.7%, and female literacy is 96.3%. In Pinarayi, 9% of the population is under 6 years of age.

Pinarayi Panchayat have administration over Pinarayi and Eruvatti census towns.

== Places of worship ==
7 mosques and 43 Hindu temples are located in this panchayat.

== Transportation ==
The national highway passes through Thalassery town. Goa and Mumbai can be accessed on the northern side and Kochi and Thiruvananthapuram can be accessed on the southern side. The road to the east of Iritty connects to Mysore and Bangalore. The nearest railway station is Thalassery on Mangalore-Palakkad line. Trains are available to almost all parts of India, subject to advance booking over the internet. There are airports at Kannur, Mangalore and Kozhikode. All of them are international airports but direct flights are available only to Middle Eastern countries.

== Famous people ==
- Pinarayi Vijayan

== See also ==
- Kannavam
- Mavilayi
- Thrippangottur
- Panoor
- Peravoor
- Kottayam-Malabar
- Mattanur
- Kannur
- Mangalore
- Iritty
- Mangattidam
- Pathiriyad
- Manantheri
- Cheruvanchery
- Mambaram
- Kadamkunnu
