= Vengad =

- Town
- Location in Kerala, India
- Coordinates: 11.88281°N 75.53513°E
- Country: India
- State: Kerala
- District: Kannur

Area
  - Total: 28.09 km^{2} (10.85 sq mi)

Population (2011)
  - Total: 38,606
  - Density: 1,374/km^{2} (3,560/sq mi)

Languages
  - Official: Malayalam, English
- Time zone: UTC+5:30 (IST)
- PIN: 670612
- Telephone code: 0497
- Vehicle registration: KL 58

Vengad is a gram panchayat situated in Thalassery taluk, Kannur district, Kerala, India, on the banks of the Anjarakandi River. Vengad is famous for its black pepper and handloom. One state seed farm is located in Vengad. Vengad gram panchayat consists of 21 wards; viz Pattathari (1), Kallayi (2), Vengad Angadi (3), Vengad Metta (4), Vengad Theru (5), Oorppalli (6), Kaitheripoyil (7), Valankichal (8), Pathiriyad (9), Pachapoika (10), Parambayi (11), Kelalur (12), Mambaram (13), Poyanad (14), Keezhathur Balavadi (15), Keezhathur Vayanasala (16), Kuzhiyil Peedika (17), Mailulli (18), Kunnirikka (19), Paduvilayi (20) and Thattari (21).

Vengad Panchayat has administration over Pathiriyad and Paduvilayi census towns. Vengad Gramapanchayat office is situated in Paduvilayi. The Kannur International Airport is 6 km away from Vengad.

== Places of worship ==
- Vengad Sree Mahavishnu temple
- Paduvilakkavu
- Peringali Aredath, Puthiyaveedu Kottam Devasthanam
- Vengad Mahaganapathy Temple (East Theru & West Theru)
- Vengad Sree kurumba kavu
- Vengad muthappan madapura
- Vengad juma masjid (Vengad angadi)
- Chambad Sri Kurumba Kavu
- Valanki Koodan Gurukkanmar Kaavu
- Koodan Gurukkanmar Kaavu Vengad
- Paduvilayi Sree Deyivathar Temple

== Schools ==
1. EKNS Govt Higher Secondary School
2. Vengad South UP School
3. Vengad LP School
4. Vengad Mappila UP School
5. Vani Vidyalayam
6. Indira Gandhi Public School
7. Kottayam Rajas High School Pathiriyad
8. Mambaram HSS Mambaram
9. Mambaram English Medium School Mambaram
10. Keezhathur U P School Keezhathur
11. Kunnirikka U P School Kunnirikka
12. Mambaram U P School Mambaram

== Transportation ==
The national highway passes through the town of Kannur. Goa and Mumbai can be accessed on the northern side and Cochin and Thiruvananthapuram can be accessed on the southern side. The road to the east of Iritty connects to Mysore and Bangalore. The nearest railway station is Kannur on Mangalore-Palakkad line. Trains are available to almost all parts of India subject to advance booking over the internet. There are airports at Mattanur, Mangalore and Calicut. All of them are international airports but direct flights are available only to Middle Eastern countries.

== See also ==
- Pachapoika
- Mambaram
