= Eruvatti =

Eruvatti Eruvatty
- Census Town
- Location in Kerala, India Eruvatti (India)
- Coordinates: 11.8090°N 75.5370°E
- Country: India
- State: Kerala
- District: Kannur

Government
  - Body: Pinarayi Grama Panchayat

Area
  - Total: 10.41 km^{2} (4.02 sq mi)

Population (2011)
  - Total: 16,905
  - Density: 1,624/km^{2} (4,206/sq mi)

Languages
  - Official: Malayalam, English
- Time zone: UTC+5:30 (IST)
- PIN: 670642
- Telephone code: 0490
- ISO 3166 code: IN-KL
- Vehicle registration: KL-58

Eruvatti is a census town in Thalassery taluk of Kannur district in the Indian state of Kerala.

== Demographics ==
As of 2011 Census, Eruvatti had a population of 16,905 with 7,769 (46%) males and 9,136 (54%) females. Eruvatti census town have an area of 10.41 km^{2} (4.02 sq mi) with 3,911 families residing in it. Average male female sex ratio was 1176 higher than the state average of 1084. In Eruvatti, 9.4% of the population was under 6 years of age. Eruvatti had an average literacy of 97% higher than the state average of 94%; male literacy was 98.2% and female literacy was 96%.

== Religion ==
As of 2011 census, Eruvatti census town had total population of 16,905 among which 14,413 (85.26%) are Hindus, 2,345 (13.87%) are Muslims and 0.87% others.

== Administration ==
Eruvatti census town is part of Pinarayi Grama Panchayat in Thalassery Block Panchayat. Eruvatti is politically part of Dharmadam (State Assembly constituency) under Kannur Loksabha constituency.
