= Pachapoika =

Village in Kerala, India

Pachapoika or Pachapoyika is a place in Vengad village, Kannur district, Kerala, India.

== Transportation ==
The national highway passes through Kannur town. Goa and Mumbai can be accessed on the northern side and Cochin and Thiruvananthapuram can be accessed on the southern side. The road to the east of Iritty connects to Mysore and Bangalore. The nearest railway station is Kannur on Mangalore-Palakkad line. Trains are available to almost all parts of India subject to advance booking over the internet. There are airports at Mattanur, Mangalore and Calicut. All of them are international airports but direct flights are available only to Middle Eastern countries. Pachapoyika pin code 670643.
