= Cheruvanchery =

- village
- Location in Kerala, India Cheruvanchery (India)
- Coordinates: 11.8284°N 75.7295°E
- Country: India
- State: Kerala
- District: Kannur

Area
  - Total: 15.21 km^{2} (5.87 sq mi)

Population (2011)
  - Total: 10,341
  - Density: 679.9/km^{2} (1,761/sq mi)

Languages
  - Official: Malayalam, English
- Time zone: UTC+5:30 (IST)
- PIN: 670650
- ISO 3166 code: IN-KL
- Vehicle registration: KL-58

Cheruvanchery is a village in Kannur district in the Indian state of Kerala. A detailed history of the town for the first time was written in a blog "Cheruvanchery: A Tale of Erased Times".

== Demographics ==
As of 2011 Census, Cheruvanchery had a population of 10,341 which constitute 4,900 (47.4%) males and 5,441 (52.6%) females. Cheruvanchery village has an area of 15.21 km^{2} (5.87 sq mi) with 2,179 families residing in it. Average sex ratio was 1110 higher than state average of 1084.

In Cheruvanchery, 11% of the population was under 6 years age. Cheruvanchery had average literacy of 92.7% lower than state average of 94%; male literacy stands at 96.1% and female literacy was 89.7%.

== Transportation ==
The national highway passes through Thalassery town. Mangalore, Goa and Mumbai can be accessed on the northern side and Cochin and Thiruvananthapuram can be accessed on the southern side. The road to the east of Iritty connects to Mysore and Bangalore. The nearest railway station is Thalassery on Mangalore-Palakkad line. Trains are available to almost all parts of India subject to advance booking over the internet. There are airports at Kannur, Mangalore and Calicut. Both of them are international airports but direct flights are available only to Middle Eastern countries.

== See also ==
- Kannavam
- Pinarayi
- Mavilayi
- Thrippangottur
- Panoor
- Peravoor
- Kottayam-Malabar
- Mattanur
- Kannur
- Iritty
- Mangattidam
- Pathiriyad
