= Dharmadam Assembly constituency =

Constituency of the Kerala legislative assembly in India

Dharmadam
- Constituency No. 12 for the Kerala Legislative Assembly
- Dharmadam within Kannur district

Constituency details
- Country: India
- Region: South India
- State: Kerala
- District: Kannur
- Lok Sabha constituency: Kannur
- Established: 2008
- Total electors: 2,06,000 (2026)
- Reservation: None

Member of Legislative Assembly
- 16th Kerala Legislative Assembly
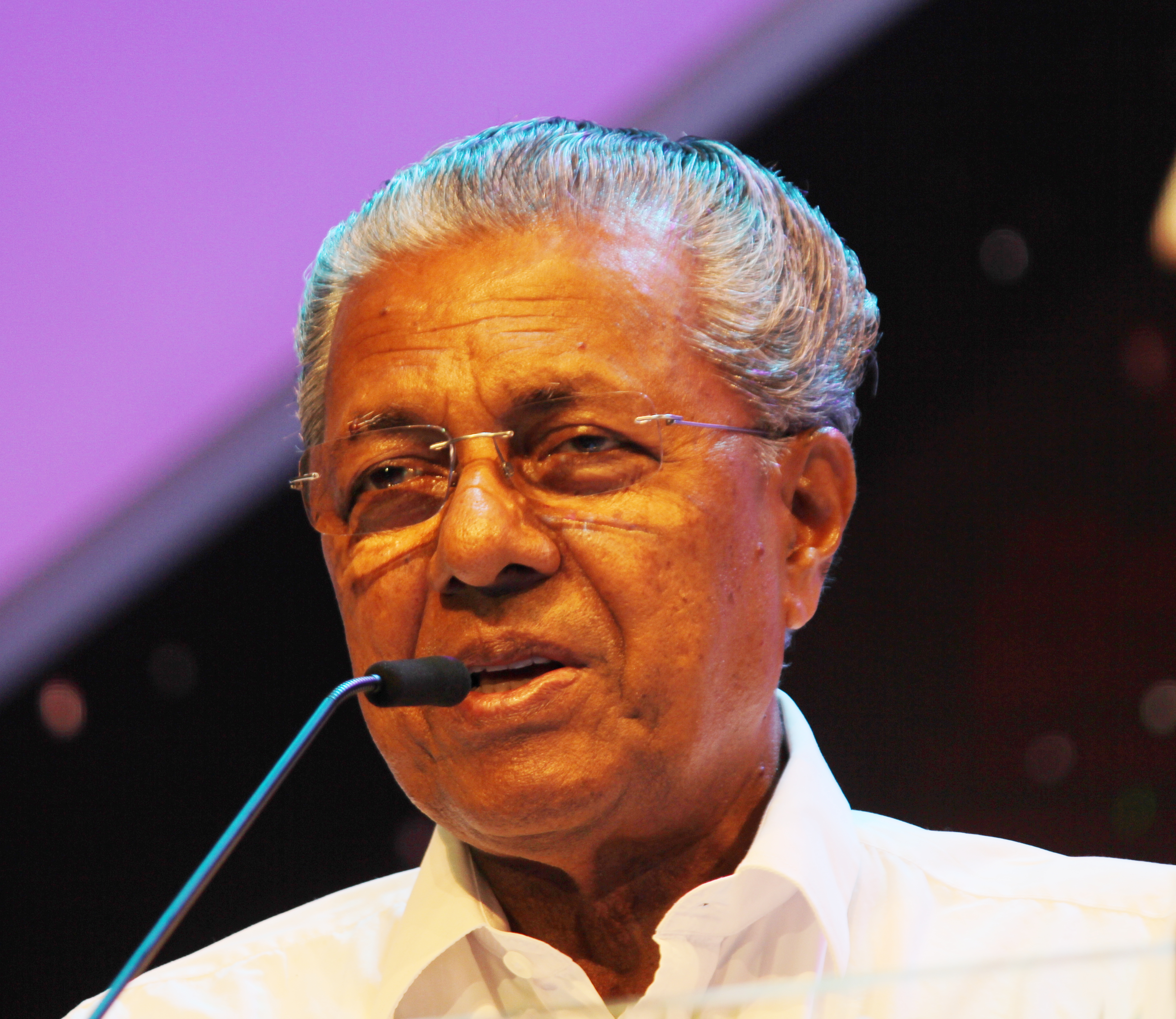
- Incumbent Pinarayi Vijayan; Leader of the Opposition in Kerala Legislative Assembly
- Party: CPI(M)
- Alliance: LDF
- Elected year: 2026

Dharmadam State assembly constituency is one of the 140 state legislative assembly constituencies in Kerala, India. It is one of the seven assembly segments that constitute the Kannur Lok Sabha constituency. Since 2016, it has been represented by Pinarayi Vijayan of the Communist Party of India (Marxist).

It was established in 2008 by incorporating major parts of the Edakkad Assembly constituency.

== Local self-governed segments ==
Dharmadam Assembly constituency is composed of the following local self-governed segments:

Name	Status (Grama panchayat/Municipality)	Taluk
Anjarakkandy	Grama Panchayat	Kannur
Chembilode	Grama panchayat	Kannur
Kadambur	Grama panchayat	Kannur
Muzhappilangad	Grama panchayat	Kannur
Peralasseri	Grama panchayat	Kannur
Dharmadom	Grama panchayat	Thalassery
Pinarayi	Grama panchayat	Thalassery
Vengad	Grama panchayat	Thalassery

== Members of Legislative Assembly ==
Year	Member	Political party
2011	K. K. Narayanan	Communist Party of India (Marxist)
2016	Pinarayi Vijayan	Communist Party of India (Marxist)
2021	Pinarayi Vijayan	Communist Party of India (Marxist)
2026	Pinarayi Vijayan	Communist Party of India (Marxist)

== Election results ==
Percentage change (±%) denotes the change in the number of votes from the immediate previous election.

=== 2026 ===
There were 2,06,000 registered voters in the Dharmadam constituency for the 2026 Kerala Assembly election.

2026 Kerala Legislative Assembly election: Dharmadam
Party	Candidate	Votes	%	±%
CPI(M)	Pinarayi Vijayan	85,614	49.87	▼9.74
INC	V. P. Abdul Rasheed	66,367	38.66	▲10.33
BJP	K. Ranjith	18,555	10.81	▲1.68
NOTA	None of the above	813	0.47	▲0.23
Independent	Vadi Hareendran	193	0.11	–
Independent	Vijayan A. M. s/o Kunhiraman	117	0.07	–
Margin of victory		19,247	11.21	▼19.95
Turnout		171,659	83.32	▲0.01
CPI(M) hold		Swing	▼9.74	

By Local body Segments
No.	Status (Local body)	Votes			Lead
No.	Status (Local body)	Pinarayi Vijayan	V. P. Abdul Rasheed	K. Ranjith	Lead
1	Chembilode	10,362	12,905	1,961	2,543
2	Anjarakandy	7,672	7,052	1,708	620
3	Vengad	13,634	12,557	2,512	1,077
4	Peralasseri	12,165	7,621	2,028	4,544
5	Kadambur	5,416	6,308	1,609	892
6	Muzhappilangad	7,211	6,600	1,378	611
7	Dharmadam	10,408	5,684	4,142	4,724
8	Pinarayi	16,550	6,347	2,875	10,203

=== 2021 ===
There were 1,93,486 registered voters in Dharmadam constituency for the 2021 Kerala Assembly election.

2021 Kerala Legislative Assembly election: Dharmadam
Party	Candidate	Votes	%	±%
CPI(M)	Pinarayi Vijayan	95,522	59.61	▲2.77
INC	C. Raghunath	45,399	28.33	▼4.49
BJP	C. K. Padmanabhan	14,623	9.13	▲0.82
SDPI	Basheer Kannadiparamba	2,280	1.42	▲0.12
Independent	Valayar Bhagyavathi	1,753	1.09	–
NOTA	None of the above	400	0.25	▼0.15
Independent	Chovva Raghunathan	137	0.09	–
Independent	C. P. Maharoof	72	0.04	–
Independent	Vadi Harindran	61	0.04	–
Margin of victory		50,123	31.16	▲7.14
Turnout		161,232	83.33	▲0.03
CPI(M) hold		Swing	▲2.77	

=== 2016 ===
There were 1,84,431 registered voters in Dharmadam constituency for the 2016 Kerala Assembly election.

2016 Kerala Legislative Assembly election: Dharmadam
Party	Candidate	Votes	%	±%
CPI(M)	Pinarayi Vijayan	87,329	56.84	▲3.71
INC	Mambaram Divakaran	50,424	32.82	▼9.18
BJP	Mohanan Mananthery	12,763	8.31	▲4.67
SDPI	Tharammal Niyas	1,994	1.30	–
NOTA	None of the above	615	0.40	New
Independent	Divakaran M. Thiruvathira	354	0.23	–
Independent	Divakaran Moottil House	148	0.10	–
Margin of victory		36,905	24.02	▲12.89
Turnout		1,53,627	83.30	▲0.10
CPI(M) hold		Swing	▲3.71	

=== 2011 ===
There were 1,63,674 registered voters in the constituency for the 2011 Kerala Legislative Assembly election.

2011 Kerala Legislative Assembly election: Dharmadam
Party	Candidate	Votes	%	±%
CPI(M)	K. K. Narayanan	72,354	53.13	
INC	Mambaram Divakaran	57,192	42.00	
BJP	C. P. Sangeetha	4,963	3.64	
Independent	Poyilore Kunnumbrom Divakaran	871	0.64	
BSP	Madhu S. Vayanan	797	0.59	
Margin of victory		15,162	11.13	
Turnout		1,36,351	83.31	
CPI(M) win (new seat)				

== See also ==
- Dharmadom
- Edakkad (State Assembly constituency)
- Kannur district
- List of constituencies of the Kerala Legislative Assembly
- 2016 Kerala Legislative Assembly election
