= Ambilad =

- Village
- Location in Kerala, India Ambilad (India)
- Coordinates: 11°51′N 75°33′E
- Country: India
- State: Kerala
- District: Kannur

Languages
  - Official: Malayalam, English
- Time zone: UTC+5:30 (IST)
- ISO 3166 code: IN-KL
- Vehicle registration: KL-

Ambilad is a village in Kannur district of Kerala, India.

== Geography ==
Ambilad is 24 km from the district headquarters, Kannur. It is in Kuthuparamba municipality.
