= Mavilayi =

- Census Town
- Location in Kerala, India Mavilayi (India)
- Coordinates: 11°50′0″N 75°28′0″E
- Country: India
- State: Kerala
- District: Kannur

Government
  - Type: Panchayati raj (India)
  - Body: Peralasseri Grama Panchayat

Area
  - Total: 8.6 km^{2} (3.3 sq mi)

Population (2011)
  - Total: 12,286
  - Density: 1,400/km^{2} (3,700/sq mi)

Languages
  - Official: Malayalam, English
- Time zone: UTC+5:30 (IST)
- ISO 3166 code: IN-KL
- Vehicle registration: KL-13
- Nearest city: Kannur
- Lok Sabha constituency: Kannur

Mavilayi is a census town in Kannur district in the Indian state of Kerala. Situated in Peralasseri Panchayath on Kannur-Kuthuparamba State Highway, 15 km away from Kannur Town.

== Demographics ==
As of 2011 Census, Mavilayi had total population of 12,286 which constitutes 5,593 (45.5%) males and 6,693 (54.5%) females. Mavilayi census town spreads over an area of 8.6 km^{2} (3.3 sq mi) with 2,699 families residing in it. The male female sex ratio was 1,197 higher than state average of 1,084. In Mavilayi, 10.5% of the population is under 6 years of age. Mavilayi had an overall literacy of 96.6% higher than state average of 94%. The male literacy stands at 98.3% and female literacy was 95.3%.

== Culture ==
Maavila Kaavu near Maavilayi is one of the historic temple in Kannur and is famous for annual celebrations of Adiyutsavam - a mock war festival which is related to the story of Daivathar trying to resolve the issue between Mootha kaikor and Ilaya kaikor.

== Educational institutions ==
- Mavilayi Central LP School
- Mavilayi LP School
- A.K.G Memorial College of Nursing
- RDC Mavilayi
- Mundayode LP School

== Government offices ==
- Mavilayi Village Office
- Sub Post Office, Mavilayi
- Veterinary Hospital

== Co-operative sector ==
- Mavilayi Service Co-Operative Bank
- Raidco Curry Powder Unit

== Art and culture ==
- Moithu Memorial Library and Public Reading Room, Mavilayi
- Voice of mavilayi Arts & Sports Club, Mavilayi
- Rural Development Centre (R D C Mavilayi)
- Mundayode Podujana Vayanassala. Mundayode
- Navajeevan Vayanasala, Mavilayi
- Cheguvera Arts club, Trikkapalam
- Victory Arts & Sports Club Cherumavilayi

== Transportation ==
The national highway passes through Thalassery town. Mangalore, Goa and Mumbai can be accessed on the northern side and Cochin and Thiruvananthapuram can be accessed on the southern side. The road to the east of Iritty connects to Mysore and Bangalore. The nearest railway station is Thalassery on Mangalore-Palakkad line. Trains are available to almost all parts of India subject to advance booking over the internet. There are airports at Mangalore and Calicut. Both of them are international airports but direct flights are available only to Middle Eastern countries.

== See also ==
- Kannavam
- Pinarayi
- Thrippangottur
- Panoor
- Peravoor
- Kottayam-Malabar
- Mattanur
- Kannur
- Iritty
- Mangattidam
- Pathiriyad
- Manantheri
- Cheruvanchery
