= Kannur City Police =

Kannur City Police കണ്ണൂർ സിറ്റി പോലീസ്
- Abbreviation: KCPD
- Motto: മൃദു ഭാവെ ദൃഢ കൃത്യേ "Mridhu Bhave Dhrida Kruthye"; Soft in Temperament, Firm in Action

Agency overview
- Formed: 2018
- Preceding agency: Kannur District Police

Jurisdictional structure
- Operations jurisdiction: Kannur City, India
- Legal jurisdiction: Kannur City, Thalassery, Kuthuparamba
- Governing body: Department of Home, Government of Kerala
- General nature: Local civilian police

Operational structure
- Headquarters: Kannur, Kerala
- Elected officer responsible: Ramesh Chennithala, Minister for Home and Vigilance, Govt of Kerala
- Agency executive: Nidhinraj P IPS, Commissioner of Police
- Parent agency: Kerala Police
- SDPOs: 3

Facilities
- Police Stations: 22

Website
- https://kannurcity.keralapolice.gov.in

Kannur City Police (KCPD) (Malayalam: കണ്ണൂർ സിറ്റി പോലീസ്), a division of the Kerala Police, is the law enforcement agency for the city of Kannur, Thalassery and Kuthuparamba. The Kannur city police force is headed by District Police Chief, also known as Commissioner of Police and the administrative control vests with the Home Department of Kerala.

The Kannur City Police District came into existence vide GO(MS)No.32/2011 dated 05/02/2011, on 3/March/2011. After the bifurcation, erstwhile Kannur District Police has been divided into Kannur city and Kannur Rural. There are 3 Subdivisions and 24 Police stations in Kannur City Police District.

The Kannur City Police Commissioner is an officer from the IPS cadre and holds the rank of Superintendent of Police (SP).

== Units ==
- District Special Branch
- C - Branch
- Narcotic Cell
- Command and control center
- Traffic Enforcement Unit
- Highway Police
- Pink Police Patrol
- District Crime Records Bureau
- Armed Reserve (AR)
- Cyber Crime PS

Special units such as District Special Branch, C-Branch (Dist. Crime Branch), Narcotics Cell, District Crime Records Bureau, District Headquarters (DHQ) are headed by Assistant Commissioners of Police (ACs).

== Police stations under Kannur City ==
Kannur City Police district have jurisdiction over 22 police(ACs) stations and 2 police control rooms. Kannur and Thalassery sub-divisions consist of eight police stations and one control rooms each and Kuthuparamba sub-division has six police stations under its jurisdiction limits.

=== Kannur Sub-division ===
- Kannur Town
- Kannur Traffic PS
- Kannur City
- Edakkad
- Chakkarakal
- Valapattanam
- Kannapuram
- Mayyil

=== Thalassery Sub-division ===
- Thalassery
- Thalassery Traffic PS
- Thalassery Coastal PS
- Dharmadom
- New Mahe
- Chockli
- Kathirur
- Pinarayi

=== Kuthuparamba Sub-division ===
- Kuthuparamba
- Mattanur
- Mattanur Airport
- Kolavelloor
- Panoor
- Kannavam
