= Manantheri =

- Census Town
- Location in Kerala, India
- Coordinates: 11.8428°N 75.6150°E
- Country: India
- State: Kerala
- District: Kannur

Area
  - Total: 17.06 km^{2} (6.59 sq mi)

Population (2011)
  - Total: 14,667
  - Density: 859.7/km^{2} (2,227/sq mi)

Languages
  - Official: Malayalam, English
- Time zone: UTC+5:30 (IST)
- PIN: 670643
- ISO 3166 code: IN-KL

Manantheri is a census town near Kuthuparamba in Kannur district in the Indian state of Kerala.

== Demographics ==
As of 2011 Census, Manatheri had a population of 14,667 which constitute 47.3% males and 52.7% females. Manantheri census town has an area of 17.06 km^{2} (6.59 sq mi) with 3,219 families residing in it. Average sex ratio was 1115 higher than the state average of 1084. Manantheri had an average literacy rate of 93.4%, lower than the state average of 94%; male literacy was 96%, and female literacy was 91%. In Manantheri, 10.77% of the population was under 6 years of age.

== History ==
Mananthery temples was the regency of mooshikarajas. These temple's first renovation was in 750 A.D Mushika Kingdom (also called Ezhimalai Kingdom, Puzhinadu, or Mushaka Rajya) was an ancient kingdom of the Tamil Sangam age in present-day northern Kerala, India, ruled by the Royal dynasty of the same name. They ruled the strip of land between Mangalore in the north and Vatakara in the south. It was one of the three kingdom of Sangam Age Kerala, along with the Chera kingdom and the Ay kingdom. Ezhimalai Mannan was the most powerful ruler of Ezhimalai, he expanded the kingdom to Wynad, Gudallore and to parts of Coimbatore. With the death of Mannan in a battle against the Cheras, the kingdom dissolved in the Chera kingdom. The heritage temples of Mananthery Mahadeva temple, Subrahmanya temple, parthasaradhi temple, Vanasasta temple and ozhakkilerykotta mahavishnu temples can be seen in their original form on Koothuparamba waynad road right turn from Manantheri Sathram Vannathimoola road 1 km (0.62 mi).

Mananthery Maha kshetra samuchaya have 5000 years of tradition. This is the Meditation place of Maha mathanga Maharshi. He used sivalinga related to kottiyoor dakshayaga story is the main temple called Mananthery Mahadeva Temple. Later on, Pazhasssiraja used this temple as his camp house in the battles with Tippusulthan and the British. The British army destroyed the compound wall and major parts of this temple. Pazhassirajas army commander Kaithery Madathil Ambu and his sister Makkam resided on the left side of the temple. The renovation of this temple started in 1996. As a part of a historic investigation related to the temple, the story of Pazhassiraja got from the folksong Thottam pattu. We requested Mathrubumi chief editor to convey the message of Pazhassirajas unknown First war against British in the history. You can see the original battlefield of Pazhassi, the destroyed Regency of Kaithery Ambu Nair and the Ancient temples of Mahadeva, Sreekrishna, Sreeporkkali, Mahavishnu, Deva senapathi Subrahmanyaswami. Valiyavelicham Industrial Estate is situated near the place up on the hill.

This place is part of the Ramayana Trail and Srirama and Lakshmana visited the hermitage of Mathanga Maharshi as advised by Kabanda. See Ramayanam. From there they proceed to Shabari Ashram, which is further south.

== Transportation ==
The national highway passes through Kannur town. Goa and Mumbai can be accessed on the northern side and Cochin and Thiruvananthapuram can be accessed on the southern side. The road to the east of Iritty connects to Mysore and Bangalore. The nearest railway station is Thalassery on Mangalore-Palakkad line. Trains are available to almost all parts of India subject to advance booking over the internet. There are airports at Mattannur, Mangalore and Calicut. All of them are international airports, but direct flights are available only to Middle Eastern countries.

== See also ==
- Thrippangottur
- Panoor
- Peravoor
- Kottayam-Malabar
- Mattanur
- Kannur
- Iritty
- Mangattidam
- Pathiriyad
