= K. K. Narayanan =

Indian politician (1948–2025)

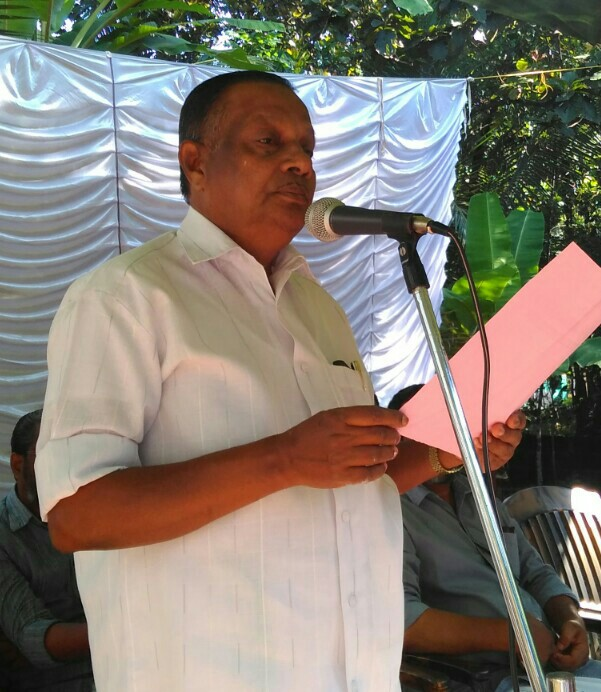

MLA, Kerala
- In office 2011–2016
- Succeeded by: Pinarayi Vijayan
- Constituency: Dharmadam

Personal details
- Born: 15 February 1948 Dharmadam, Madras Province, India
- Died: 30 December 2025 (aged 77) Kannur, Kerala, India
- Party: CPI(M)
- Spouse: Smt. Susheela

K.K. Narayanan (15 February 1948 – 30 December 2025) was an Indian politician from the state of Kerala, who was a member of the Legislative Assembly of Kerala from 2011 to 2016. He represented the Dharmadom constituency of Kerala and was a member of the Communist Party of India (Marxist) (CPI(M)) political party.

== Background ==
Narayanan was born at Peralassery on 15 February 1948. He died on 30 December 2025, at the age of 77.

== Political career ==
Narayanan was the president of Kannur District Panchayat and Kannur District Co-operative Bank. He was also a Member of C.P.I.(M) Kannur District Secretariat. Also he was the president, Motor Labourers Union (C.I.T.U.) Kannur District Committee, Chairman of Vismaya Amusement Park, Kannur and President, A.K.G. Co-operative Hospital.
