= Peralasseri =

- Census Town
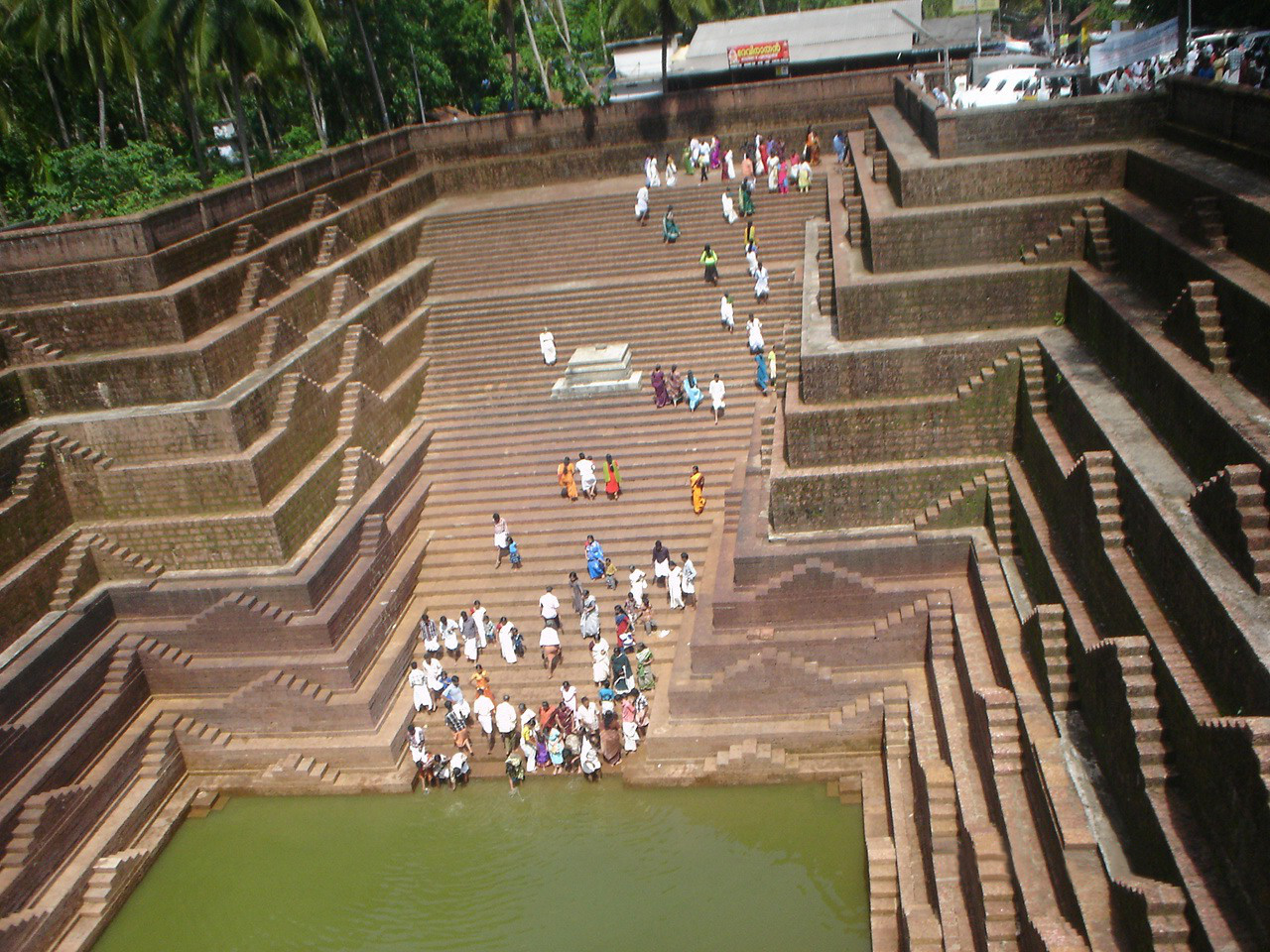
- Temple Pond in Peralassery

- Location in Kerala, India Peralasseri (India)
- Coordinates: 11.849140°N 75.486010°E
- Country: India
- State: Kerala
- District: Kannur
- Taluk: Kannur

Government
  - Body: Peralasseri Grama Panchayat

Area
  - Total: 10.76 km^{2} (4.15 sq mi)

Population (2011)
  - Total: 16,821
  - Density: 1,563/km^{2} (4,049/sq mi)

Languages
  - Official: Malayalam, English
- Time zone: UTC+5:30 (IST)
- ISO 3166 code: IN-KL

Peralasseri is a census town and a grama panchayat in Kannur district in the Indian state of Kerala. It is located on the State Highway 38, about 15 km (9.3 mi) south east of Kannur city and 10 km (6.2 mi) west of Kuthuparamba town, on the banks of Anajarakandy river.

== Geography ==
Peralasseri is 16 kilometres (9.9 mi) from the district headquarters Kannur. The nearest railway stations are Thalassery and Kannur which are located 15 km (9.3 mi) and 16 km (9.9 mi) respectively from here. It is surrounded by 4 panchayats: Kadambur, Vengad, Anjarakandi and Pinarayi.

== Demographics ==
As of 2011 Census, Peralasseri had a population of 16,821 which constitutes 7,687 (45.7%) males and 9,134 (54.3%) females. Peralasseri census town spreads over an area of 10.76 km^{2} (4.15 sq mi) with 3,830 families residing in it. The male female sex ratio was 1,188 higher than state average of 1,084. In Peralasseri, 10.3% of the population is under 6 years of age. Peralasseri had an overall literacy of 97.9% higher than state average of 94%. The male literacy stands at 98.8% and female literacy was 97%.

== Religion ==
As of 2011 census, Peralasseri census town had total population of 16,821, which constitutes 79.4% Hindus, 20.4% Muslims and 0.2% others.

== Transportation ==
Kannur - Kuthuparamba state highway passes through Peralasser, which is about 14 km from Kannur International Airport.

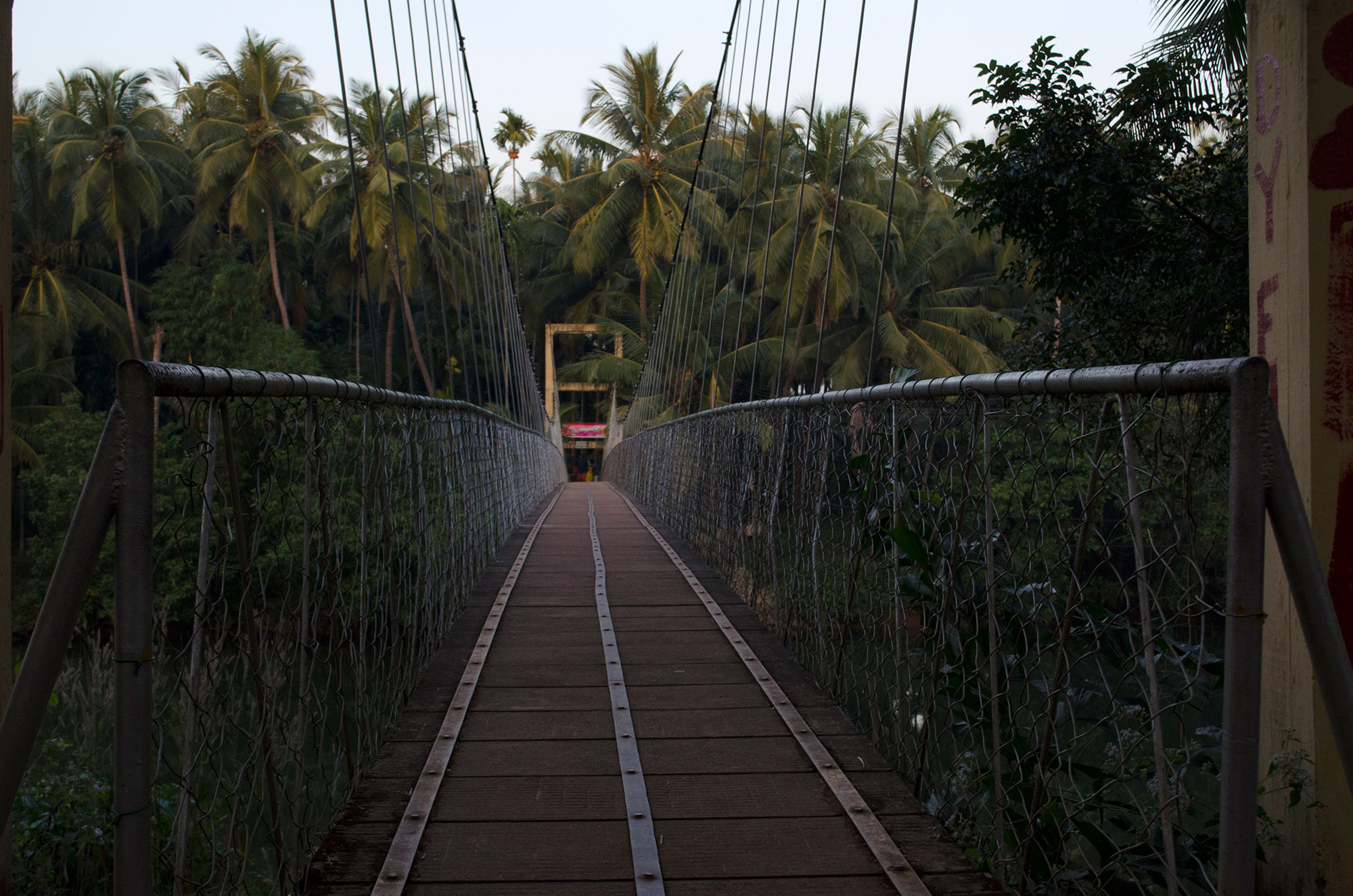
Hanging Bridge at Peralassery

The bridge of Peralasseri across the Anjarakandy River is one of the few hanging bridges in Kannur district.

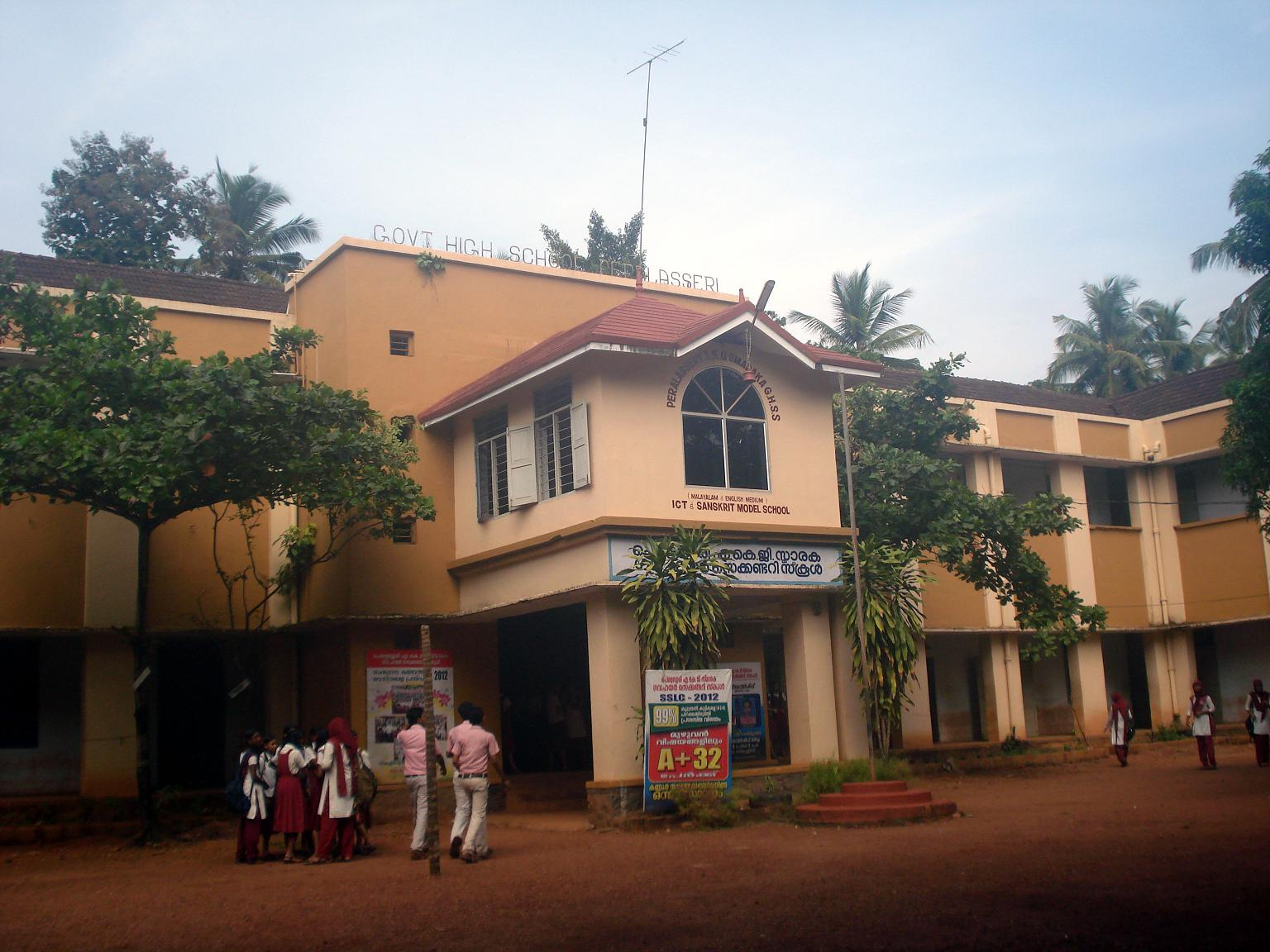
AKG High School, Peralassery

== Education ==
- AKG Smaraka Govt.Higher secondary school
- Viswabharathi Public School, Mavilayi
