= Keezhallur =

- Census Town
- Location in Kerala, India Keezhallur (India)
- Coordinates: 11°55′0″N 75°33′0″E
- Country: India
- State: Kerala
- District: Kannur

Government
  - Type: Panchayati Raj (India)

Area
  - Total: 29.02 km^{2} (11.20 sq mi)

Population (2011)
  - Total: 20,440
  - Density: 704.3/km^{2} (1,824/sq mi)

Languages
  - Official: Malayalam, English
- Time zone: UTC+5:30 (IST)
- PIN: 670612
- Telephone code: 0490
- ISO 3166 code: IN-KL

Keezhallur is a census town in Kannur district in the Indian state of Kerala.

== Demographics ==
As of 2011 Census, Keezhallur had a population of 20,440 with 9,756 males and 10,684 females. Keezhallur Census Town has an area of 29.02 km^{2} (11.20 sq mi) with 4,434 families residing in it. The average sex ratio was 1095 higher than the state average of 1084. In Keezhallur, 10.9% of the population was under 6 years of age. Keezhallur had an average literacy of 95.5% higher than the state average of 94%: male literacy was 97.7% and female literacy was 93.5%.

== Religion ==
As of 2011 Census, Keezhallur census town had a population of 20,440 among which 15,342 (75%) are Hindus, 5,014 (24.53%) are Muslims and 0.43% others.

== Administration ==
Keezhallur Panchayat is part of Mattanur Assembly constituency in Kannur Lok Sabha constituency.

== Transportation ==
The national highway passes through Kannur town. Goa and Mumbai can be accessed on the northern side and Cochin and Thiruvananthapuram can be accessed on the southern side. The road to the east of Iritty connects to Mysore and Bangalore. The nearest railway station is Kannur on Mangalore-Palakkad line. Trains are available to almost all parts of India subject to advance booking over the internet. There are airports at Mattanur, Mangalore and Calicut. All of them are international airports but direct flights are available only to Middle Eastern countries.
