= Mangattidam =

- Census Town
- Location in Kerala, India Mangattidam (India)
- Coordinates: 11°51′40″N 75°33′45″E
- Country: India
- State: Kerala
- District: Kannur

Government
  - Type: Panchayati raj (India)

Area
  - Total: 16.38 km^{2} (6.32 sq mi)

Population
  - Total: 18,627
  - Density: 1,137/km^{2} (2,945/sq mi)

Languages
  - Official: Malayalam, English
- Time zone: UTC+5:30 (IST)
- ISO 3166 code: IN-KL
- Vehicle registration: KL-58

Mangattidam is a census town and a panchayat situated near Kuthuparamba in Thalassery taluk, Kannur district, Kerala, India.

== Demographics ==
As of 2011 Census, Mangattidam had a population of 18,627. Males constitute 47.3% of the population and females 52.7%. Mangattidam census town has an area of 16.38 km^{2} (6.32 sq mi) with 4,169 families residing in it. Average sex ratio was 1115 higher than state average of 1084. Mangattidam had an average literacy rate of 95.6%, higher than the state average of 94%: male literacy stands at 97.9%, and female literacy was 93.6%. In Mangattidam, 9.8% of the population was under 6 years of age.

== Education ==
Nirmalagiri college, Kuthuparamba is situated in Mangattidam panchayat.

== Transportation ==
The national highway passes through Thalassery town. Mangalore, Goa and Mumbai can be accessed on the northern side and Cochin and Thiruvananthapuram can be accessed on the southern side. The road to the east of Iritty connects to Mysore and Bangalore. The nearest railway station is Thalassery on Mangalore-Palakkad line. Trains are available to almost all parts of India subject to advance booking over the internet. There are airports at Kannur ( Mattannur ) Mangalore and Calicut. Both of them are international airports but direct flights are available only to Middle Eastern countries.

== See also ==
- Kannavam
- Pinarayi
- Mavilayi
- Thrippangottur
- Kuthuparamba
