= Paduvilayi =

- Census Town
- Location in Kerala, India Paduvilayi (India)
- Coordinates: 11°52′0″N 75°31′10″E
- Country: India
- State: Kerala
- District: Kannur

Area
  - Total: 15.08 km^{2} (5.82 sq mi)

Population (2011)
  - Total: 20,598
  - Density: 1,366/km^{2} (3,538/sq mi)

Languages
  - Official: Malayalam, English
- Time zone: UTC+5:30 (IST)
- PIN: 670612,670643
- ISO 3166 code: IN-KL

Paduvilayi is a census town in Kannur district in the Indian state of Kerala. Paduvilayi is situated in Anjarakandi. There are more than 20,000 people living in this census town.

== Demographics ==
As of 2011 Census, Paduvilayi had a population of 20,598. Males constitute 47.3% of the population and females 52.7%. Paduvilayi census town has an area of 15.08 km^{2} (5.82 sq mi) with 4,243 families residing in it. Average male female sex ratio was 1113 higher than state average of 1084. Paduvilayi has an average literacy rate of 95.4%, higher than the state average of 94%; male literacy was 97.7%, and female literacy was 93.4%. In Paduvilayi, 11.3% of the population was under 6 years of age.

== Transportation ==
The national highway passes through Kannur town. Goa and Mumbai can be accessed on the northern side and Cochin and Thiruvananthapuram can be accessed on the southern side. The road to the east of Iritty connects to Mysore and Bangalore. The nearest railway station is Kannur on Mangalore-Palakkad line. Trains are available to almost all parts of India subject to advance booking over the internet. There are airports at Mattanur, Mangalore and Calicut. All of them are international airports but direct flights are available only to Middle Eastern countries.
