= Kandamkunnu =

- Census Town
- Location in Kerala, India Kandamkunnu (India)
- Coordinates: 11°52′0″N 75°34′0″E
- Country: India
- State: Kerala
- District: Kannur

Area
  - Total: 16.93 km^{2} (6.54 sq mi)

Population (2011)
  - Total: 16,025
  - Density: 946.5/km^{2} (2,452/sq mi)

Languages
  - Official: Malayalam, English
- Time zone: UTC+5:30 (IST)
- PIN: 670701
- ISO 3166 code: IN-KL

Kandamkunnu is a census town in Kannur district in the Indian state of Kerala.

== Demographics ==
As of 2011 Census, Kandamkunnu had a population of 16,025 which constitute 7,552 males and 8,473 females. Kandamkunnu census town have an area of 16.93 km^{2} (6.54 sq mi) with 3,337 families residing in it. Average male female sex ratio was 1122 higher than state average of 1084. In Kandamkunnu, 11.5% of the population was under 6 years of age. Kandamkunnu had an average literacy of 95.4% higher than the state average of 94%; male literacy was 97.7% and female literacy was 93.4%.

== Transportation ==
The national highway passes through Kannur town. Goa and Mumbai can be accessed on the northern side and Cochin and Thiruvananthapuram can be accessed on the southern side. The road to the east of Iritty connects to Mysore and Bangalore. The nearest railway station is Thalassery on Mangalore-Palakkad line. Trains are available to almost all parts of India subject to advance booking over the internet. There are airports at Mattanur, Mangalore and Calicut. All of them are international airports but direct flights are available only to Middle Eastern countries.
