= Kannavam =

- Village
- Location in Kerala, India Kannavam (India)
- Coordinates: 11°50′0″N 75°40′0″E
- Country: India
- State: Kerala
- District: Kannur

Government
  - Type: Panchayati raj (India)

Area
  - Total: 16.74 km^{2} (6.46 sq mi)
- Elevation: 16 m (52 ft)

Population (2011)
  - Total: 9,211
  - Density: 550.2/km^{2} (1,425/sq mi)

Languages
  - Official: Malayalam, English
- Time zone: UTC+5:30 (IST)
- PIN: 670650
- ISO 3166 code: IN-KL
- Literacy: 93.66%
- Lok Sabha constituency: Kannur
- Assembly constituency: Mattanur

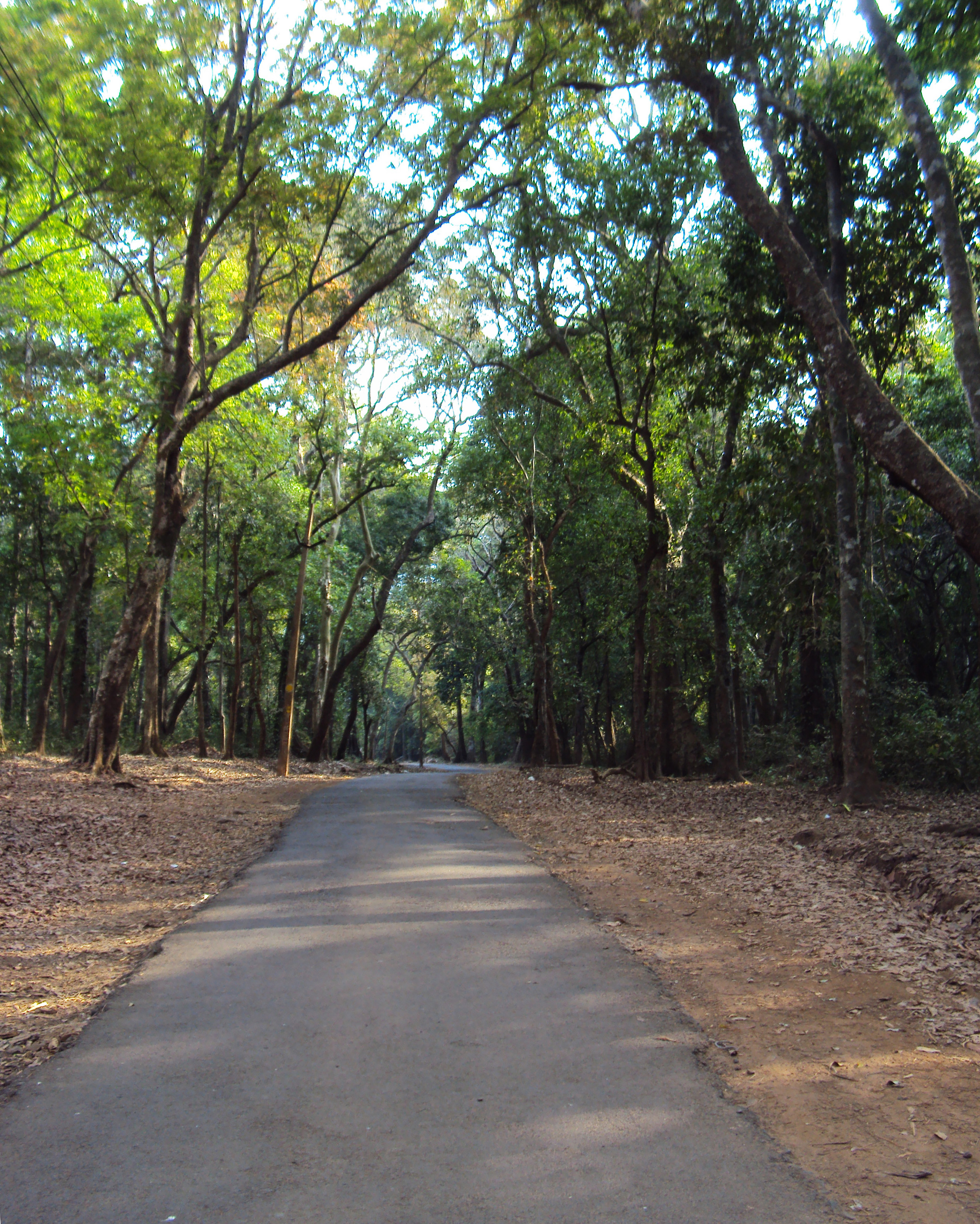
Kannavam

Kannavam is a village and forest in Thalassery Taluk in Kannur District of Kerala State, India. It comes under Chittaripparamba Panchayat. It is located 37 km (23 mi) south east of District headquarters Kannur, 13 km (8.1 mi) east of Kuthuparamba and 466 km (290 mi) from State capital Thiruvananthapuram

== Velumbath Makham Sharif ==
Kannavam forest started to become popular during the reign of Kottayam Veera Pazhassi The glory of the forest was the glory of Kannnavam. Kannavam forest could be seen if you travel on Thalassery - Manthavadi route before 1815. The historical Velumbath Makham is situated in the middle of this forest.

This mosque is in the middle of a vast forest and is absolutely amazing. Once, the journey from Thalassery to Mananthavadi was by passing this mosque. Since, there was no mosque in both Cheruvanchery and Kannavam, people used to come to this mosque for performing their daily prayer. Thalassery - Mananthavadi journey became easy after the construction of Kannavam Bridge over the Kannavam river in 1815 by the British.

== Demographics ==
As of 2011 Census, Kannavam had a population of 9,211 of which 4,345 are males while 4,866 are females. Kannavam village has a geographical area of 16.73 km^{2} (6.46 sq mi) with 2,084 families residing in it.

In Kannavam village population of children with age 0-6 is 943 which makes up 10.24% of total population of village. Average Sex Ratio of Kannavam village is 1120 which is higher than Kerala state average of 1084. Child Sex Ratio for the Kannavam as per census is 1059, higher than Kerala average of 964.

Kannavam village has lower literacy rate compared to Kerala. In 2011, literacy rate of Kannavam village was 93.66% compared to 94.00% of Kerala. In Kannavam Male literacy stands at 96.50% while female literacy rate was 91.14%.

== Transportation ==
The national highway passes through Thalassery town. Mangalore, Goa and Mumbai can be accessed on the northern side and Cochin and Thiruvananthapuram can be accessed on the southern side. The road to the east of Iritty connects to Mysore and Bangalore. The nearest railway station is Thalassery on Mangalore-Palakkad line. Trains are available to almost all parts of India subject to advance booking over the internet. There are airports at Mangalore and Calicut. Both of them are international airports but direct flights are available only to Middle Eastern countries.

== Caste profile ==
Schedule Tribe (ST) constitutes 1.66% while Schedule Caste (SC) were 1.26% of total population in Kannavam village.

== Work profile ==
In Kannavam village out of total population, 3533 were engaged in work activities. 92.90% of workers describe their work as Main Work (Employment or Earning more than 6 Months) while 7.10% were involved in Marginal activity providing livelihood for less than 6 months. Of 3533 workers engaged in Main Work, 180 were cultivators (owner or co-owner) while 496 were Agricultural labourer.

== See also ==
- Nedumpoyil
- Pinarayi
- Mavilayi
- Thrippangottur
- Panoor
- Peravoor
- Kottayam-Malabar
