= Thrippangottur =

- Village
- Location in Kerala, India Thrippangottur (India)
- Coordinates: 11.78435°N 75.655918°E
- Country: India
- State: Kerala
- District: Kannur
- Taluk: Thalassery

Government
  - Type: Panchayati raj (India)
  - Body: Thrippangottur Grama Panchayat

Area
  - Total: 32.39 km^{2} (12.51 sq mi)

Population (2011)
  - Total: 29,911
  - Density: 923.5/km^{2} (2,392/sq mi)

Languages
  - Official: Malayalam, English
- Time zone: UTC+5:30 (IST)
- ISO 3166 code: IN-KL
- Vehicle registration: KL 58

Thrippangottur is a Village and a Grama Panchayat in Kannur district in the Indian state of Kerala.

== Demographics ==
As of 2011 Census, Thrippangottur had a population of 29,911, with 13,644 (45.6%) males and 16,267 (54.4%) females. Thrippangottur village spreads over an area of 32.39 km^{2} (12.51 sq mi) with 6,536 families residing in it. Average sex ratio was 1192 higher than the state average of 1084. In Thrippangottur, 13% of the population was under 6 years of age. Thrippangottur had an average literacy of 94% same as the state average of 94%; male literacy stands at 96.8% and female literacy was 91.7%.

== Transportation ==
The national highway passes through Thalassery town. Mangalore, Goa and Mumbai can be accessed on the northern side and Cochin and Thiruvananthapuram can be accessed on the southern side. The road to the east of Iritty connects to Mysore and Bangalore. The nearest railway station is Thalassery on Mangalore-Palakkad line. Trains are available to almost all parts of India subject to advance booking over the internet. There are airports at Kannur and Kozhikode Calicut. Both of them are international airports but direct flights are available only to Middle Eastern countries.

== See also ==
- Kannavam
- Pinarayi
- Mavilayi
- Panoor
- Peravoor
