= Pathiriyad =

- Census Town
- Location in Kerala, India Pathiriyad (India)
- Coordinates: 11.842470°N 75.5093900°E
- Country: India
- State: Kerala
- District: Kannur

Government
  - Type: Panchayati raj (India)
  - Body: Vengad Grama Panchayat

Area
  - Total: 13.01 km^{2} (5.02 sq mi)

Population (2011)
  - Total: 18,008
  - Density: 1,384/km^{2} (3,585/sq mi)

Languages
  - Official: Malayalam, English
- Time zone: UTC+5:30 (IST)
- ISO 3166 code: IN-KL

Pathiriyad is a census town in Kannur district in the Indian state of Kerala.

== Transportation ==
The national highway passes through Thalassery town. Mangalore, Goa, and Mumbai can be accessed on the northern side, and Cochin and Thiruvananthapuram can be accessed on the southern side. The road to the east of Iritty connects to Mysore and Bangalore. The nearest railway station is Thalassery on the Mangalore-Palakkad line. Trains are available to almost all parts of India subject to advance booking over the internet. There are airports at Mangalore and Calicut. Both of them are international airports, but direct flights are available only to Middle Eastern countries.

== Demographics ==
As of 2011 Census, Pathiriyad had a population of 18,008 which constitute 46.4% males and 53.6% females. Pathiriyad census town has an area of 13.01 km^{2} (5.02 sq mi) with 3,914 families residing in it. Average sex ratio was 1156 higher than state average of 1084. Pathiriyad has an average literacy rate of 96.2%, higher than the state average of 94%; male literacy was 98%, and female literacy was 95.3%. In Pathiriyad, 10.5% of the population is under 6 years of age.
