= Kannur International Airport =

Airport serving Kannur, Kerala, India

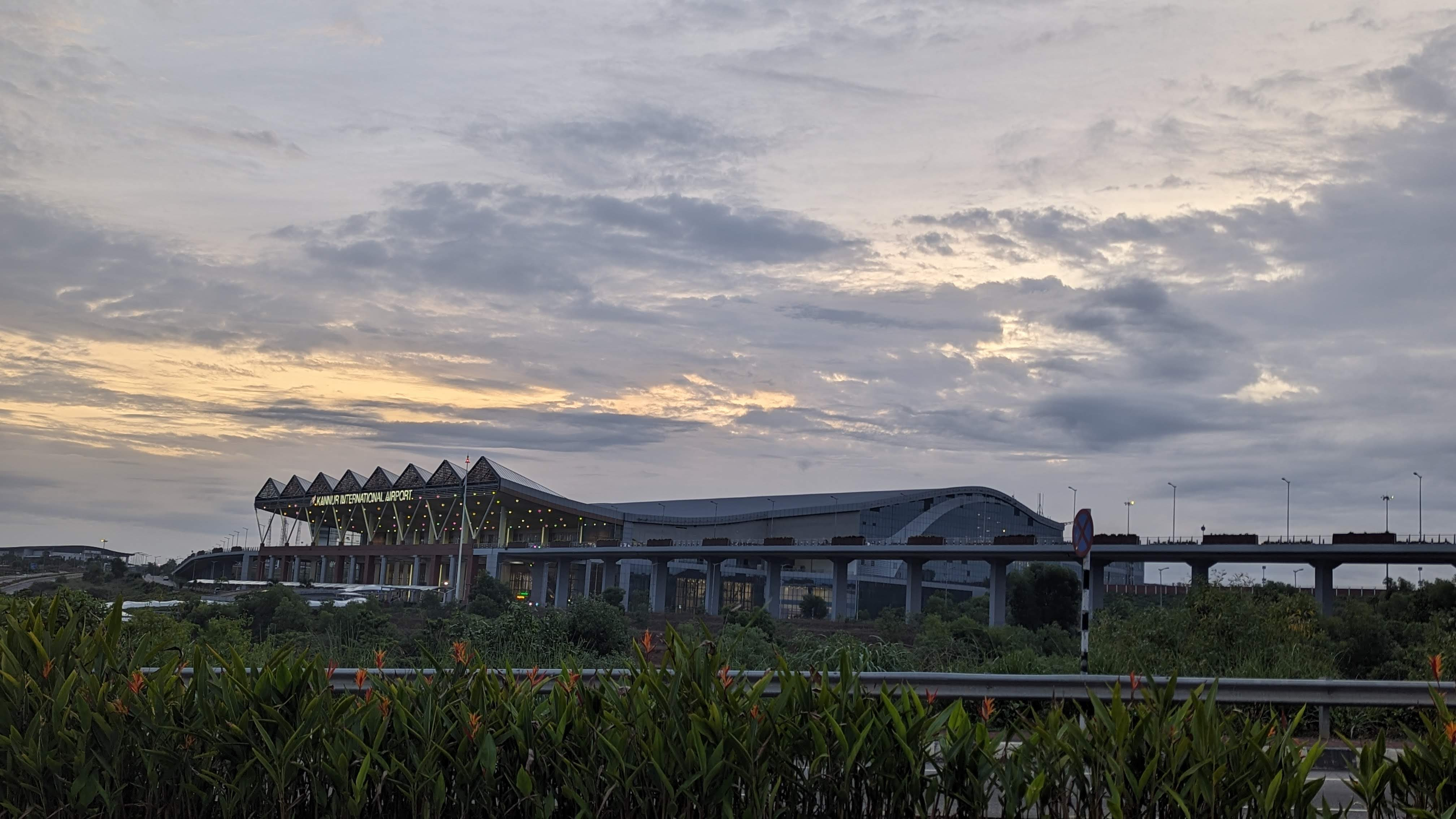
- IATA: CNN; ICAO: VOKN

Summary
- Airport type: Public
- Owner/Operator: Kannur International Airport Limited (KIAL)
- Serves: Kannur district
- Location: Mattanur, Kannur district, Kerala, India
- Opened: 9 December 2018; 7 years ago
- Hub for: Air India Express
- Focus city for: IndiGo
- Elevation AMSL: 344 ft (105 m)
- Coordinates: 11.92°N 75.55°E
- Website: kannurairport.aero

Map
- Location within Kerala Location within India

Runways
Direction	Length		Surface
Direction	m	ft	Surface
07/25	3,050	10,007	Asphalt

Statistics (April 2025 - March 2026)
- Passengers: 1,434,168 (▲6.7%)
- Aircraft movements: 11,719 (▲1.4%)
- Cargo tonnage: 3,498 (▼15.8)
- Source: AAI, Airport facilities per AIM India

Kannur International Airport (IATA: CNN, ICAO: VOKN) is an international airport serving the city of Kannur, Wayanad district, Mahé district of Puducherry and the rest of northern Kerala in India. It is located in Mattanur, 28 km (17 mi) east of Kannur and 24 km (15 mi) east of Thalassery. It is owned and operated by Kannur International Airport Limited (KIAL), a public–private consortium. The airport opened for commercial operations on 9 December 2018.

The airport served one million passengers in just nine months since commercial operations began. Amidst the COVID-19 pandemic in India, the airport could maintain stable growth, and it achieved the milestone of two million passengers in the twenty-third month of operations in November 2020. Though several international airlines have reportedly shown interest in operating from Kannur, they are unable to operate regularly scheduled flights from Kannur International Airport as the airport lacks point of call status. The airport handled 1.5 million passengers in 2025, marking the highest annual passenger traffic since it began operations. The previous record was 1.47 million passengers in 2019.

The first aircraft to land was an Indian Air Force (IAF) aircraft that touched down at the airport on 29 February 2016. The first trial passenger flight operation was conducted on 20 September 2018, using a Boeing 737-800 aircraft of Air India Express. On the inaugural day, 9 December 2018, an Air India Express flight IX 715, operated with a Boeing 737-800, took off to Abu Dhabi at 10:13 (IST), becoming the first commercial passenger aircraft to depart from Kannur. The airport was inaugurated by then Minister of Civil Aviation, Suresh Prabhu and Chief Minister of Kerala, Pinarayi Vijayan.

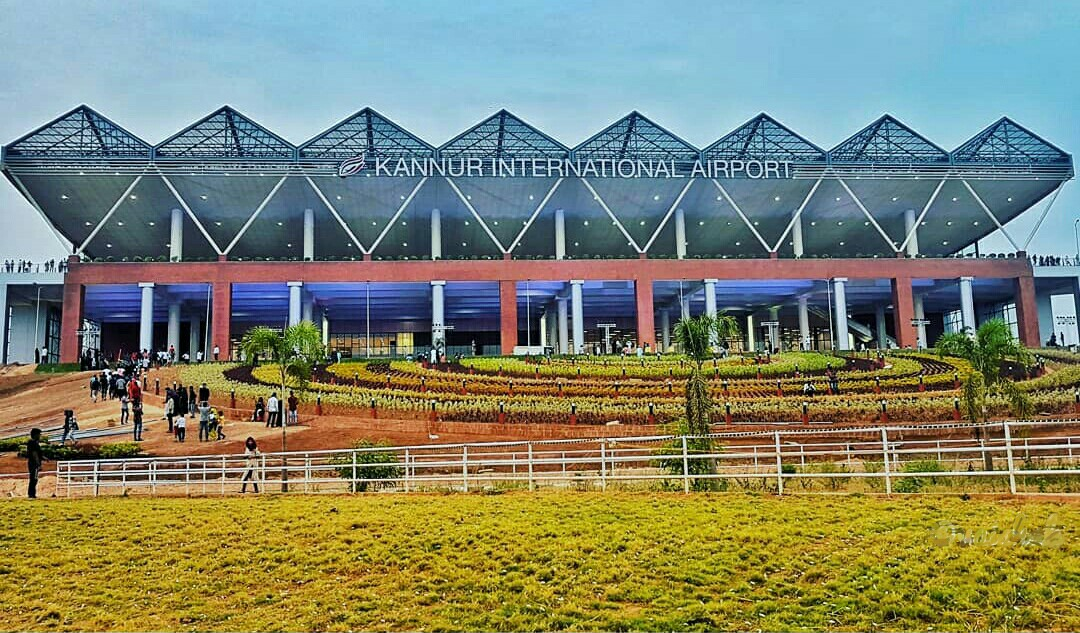
Terminal building of the airport

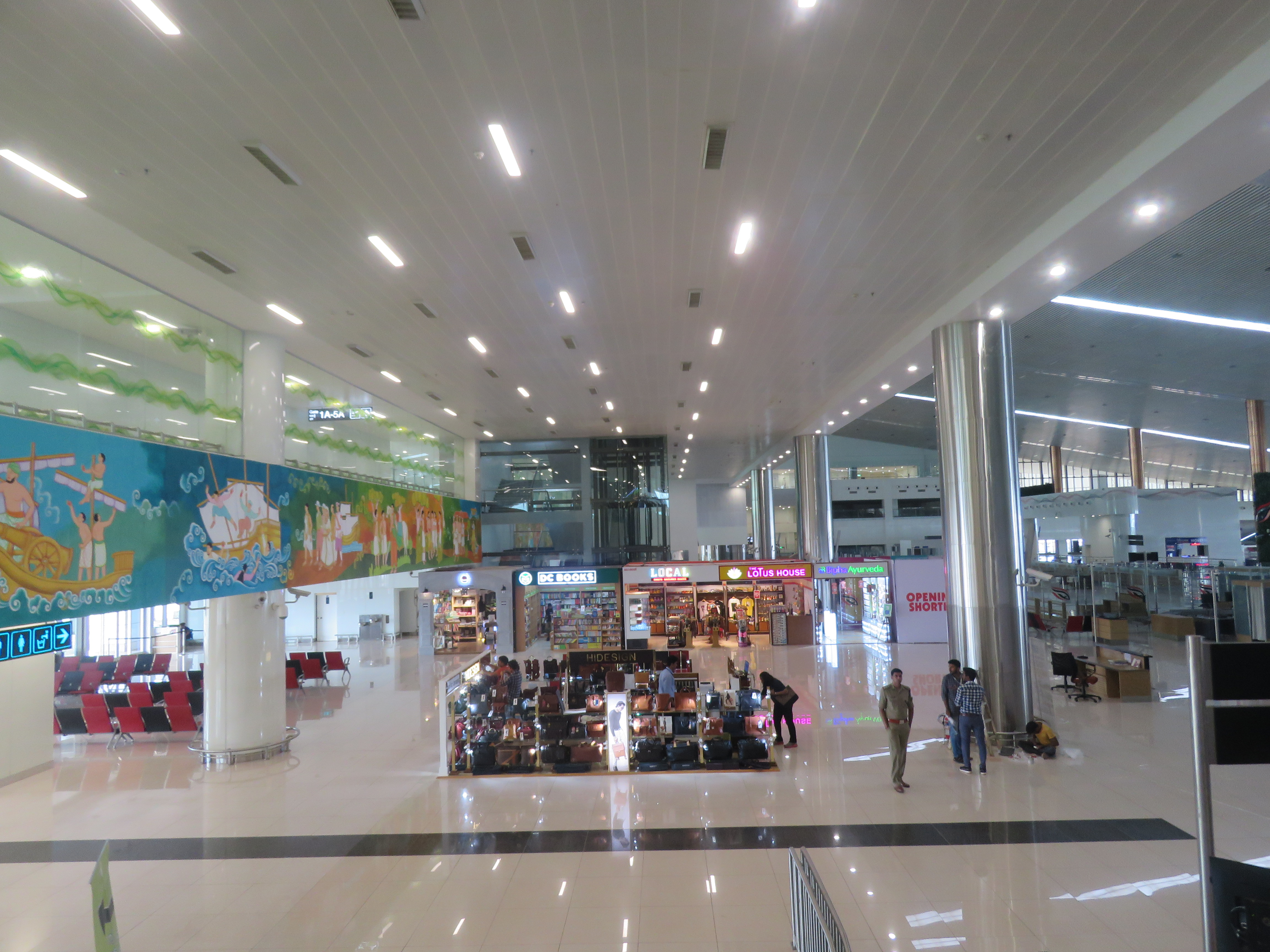
Terminal Interior

== History ==
Kannur had an airstrip used for commercial aviation as early as 1935 when TATA airlines operated weekly flights between Bombay and Thiruvananthapuram – stopping at Goa and Cannanore. This airstrip was located within the Kannur Cantonment area at Fort Maidan. The operator started service to Kerala on 29 October 1935 but service did not last long.

The long-standing demand for a full-fledged airport was only conceptualized in 1997, when C. M. Ibrahim, the then Union Minister of Civil Aviation, backed the proposal for an airport in the district. The vast extent of land at Moorkhanparamba near Mattannur was identified for the project a few months later following a hectic search for land for developing the proposed airport. The then Chief Minister of Kerala V. S. Achuthanandan laid the foundation stone for the airport at the project site marking the formal commencement of construction activities on 17 December 2010 at a function attended by the then Civil Aviation Minister Praful Patel. Though the State government accorded sanction for the Kannur International Airport project in January 1998 and appointed Kerala Industrial Infrastructure Development Corporation (KINFRA) as the nodal agency for its implementation, it had to wait for a decade until it was finally approved by the Central government in January 2008. During the period, a private agency appointed by Kerala Industrial Infrastructure Development Corporation (KINFRA) to study techno-economic feasibility report submitted its report. The earlier site proposed at Madayipara was dropped owing to ecological concerns. Two vast plateaus near Mattannur were identified for the airport, namely Moorkhanparamb and Velliyamparamb, with about 1300 acres and 800 acres of land to be acquired from each respectively.

After a prolonged wait, the airport received in-principle approval from the Ministry of Civil Aviation and Union cabinet in January 2008. Land acquisition began in December 2008 after issuing notifications and fixing compensation. The public company Kannur International Airport Limited (KIAL), under the Public-Private Partnership (PPP) model, was registered in October 2009. The foundation stone for the airport was laid on 17 December 2010 by then-Chief Minister V. S. Achuthanandan. On 26 November 2013, KIAL and Larsen & Toubro Ltd signed a contract on construction work at the airport. In January 2014, the Kerala State Government Minister for Excise and Ports announced the Kerala State Government and AAI plan to sign an MoU on the equity structure of Kannur International Airport Limited.

Construction work at the airport was inaugurated by Defence Minister and senior Congress leader A. K. Antony on 2 February 2014. On 29 February 2016, the first trial flight landed, and Chief Minister Oommen Chandy flagged off the inauguration of the runway.

Kannur International Airport commenced operations on 9 December 2018. The first commercial aircraft to operate out of the airport was Air India Express IX 715 (Boeing 737-800) to Abu Dhabi, which took off at 10:13 (IST) on the same day. The flight was jointly flagged off by the Chief Minister of Kerala, Pinarayi Vijayan and Union Minister for Civil Aviation, Suresh Prabhu.

Aircraft of several foreign airlines touched down for the first time at Kannur International Airport in June 2020 as part of the repatriation flights arranged owing to the COVID-19. Widebody aircraft also landed for the first time in June. Airbus A330-200 of Kuwait Airways, was the first foreign airline and also the first widebody aircraft that landed at Kannur. The aircraft of Kuwait Airways, Flydubai, Jazeera Airways, SalamAir, Gulf Air, Air Arabia, Etihad Airways, Saudia, and Oman Air operated to and from Kannur during June–August 2020 as repatriation/chartered flights.

== Construction ==
By August 2010, acquisition of about 1200 acres of land was completed in two phases, and acquisition of another 780 acres was in progress for the third phase.

In July 2011, the Oommen Chandy government decided to make Airports Authority of India a consultant tasked with preparing a revised techno-economic feasibility report and a new master plan and design. As the Airports Authority of India failed to submit the report in time, the consultancy was canceled and Cochin International Airport (CIAL) was entrusted to prepare the detailed project report, but the floating of tenders for construction was further delayed as experts found several technical flaws in the design prepared by CIAL.

Land acquired by the government under KINFRA was transferred to KIAL earlier in February 2012. In August 2012, Mumbai based company STUP Consultants Pvt Ltd. was made consultant to review the revised report by CIAL and to assist KIAL in other aspects of the project, but the agreement was canceled within two weeks as it was found that the company had been blacklisted in other states. Fresh bids were solicited and Hong Kong-based AECOM Asia was awarded the consultancy. The project office was inaugurated at Mattannur in December 2012.

=== EPC-I & EPC-II ===
It was decided to build the airport in two stages of engineering, procurement, and construction (EPC). The first stage, EPC-I included complete earthwork, runway, taxiway, apron, ground lighting and associated infrastructure such as perimeter and operational walls.

The second stage, EPC-II, involved the integrated terminal building, air traffic control tower, administrative and technical blocks, and facilities in the buildings such as aerobridges, escalators, elevators and counters. Infrastructure and engineering conglomerate Larsen & Toubro (L&T) was awarded work for EPC-I on 27 November 2013, after inviting bids. Airport work was flagged off by the then Defense Minister A.K. Antony at a public function in Mattannur on 2 February 2014. L&T also won the tender for EPC-II works including the construction of the passenger terminal building (PTB) on 25 June 2014. A huge amount of earthwork was carried out at the site including the cutting and filling of a total 2,340,000 cubic metres (3,060,000 cu yd) of land at a maximum rate of 70,000 cubic metres (92,000 cu yd) per day. About 50% of the land works and foundation and piling work for constructing the PTB and air traffic control tower were completed by March 2015. By August 2015, about 60% of the runway was completed. Steps were initiated to procure lifts, a baggage handling system, passenger boarding bridges, and the four Airfield Crash Fire Tenders. About 70% of the work on the runway, apron and associated work, and 52% of the PTB and allied work was completed by December 2015. Works for a 28,000 square metres (33,000 yd^{2}) fuel farm also began the same month. The then Kerala Airports Minister K. Babu ruled out the popular demand to extend the runway to 4,000 metres (4,400 yd). Meanwhile, the third phase of land acquisition involving about 785 acres on Velliyamparmb, which began in 2011, had been progressing at a very slow pace and only 612 acres were acquired in five years. The late decision to acquire more land for a runway extension from 3,050 metres (3,340 yd) to 3,400 metres (3,700 yd) on the western side, in the finishing stages of the project, triggered protests from residents. A trial landing was conducted on a completed 2,400 metres (2,600 yd) runway by a 14-seater code B aircraft on 29 February 2016. The air traffic control tower was not involved as it was still under construction. Technical assistance of the Aviation Control of the Calicut airport was sought for the landing. No runway calibration, or testing of flight parameters, was done during the landing. The trial landing was organized as a major event by the authorities and involved extensive public participation. The Oommen Chandy government faced fierce criticism for organizing such an event when the whole airport project was not complete. The opposition termed it an "election stunt" as Kerala was going to the polls in the coming months. Around ₹30 lakh (US$32,000) were spent on the event.

By May 2016, the 3,050 metres (3,340 yd) runway was completed with work on the 150 metres (160 yd) grading side strip on both ends progressing. 68% of the PTB, 75% of the ATC tower and much of the work for the fuel farm was completed. Work on the ancillary buildings – fire rescue station, power house, the area for the India Meteorological Department (IMD), sewage treatment plant, service block, and the airfield ground lighting substation were progressing. The newly elected Pinaryi government decided to begin land acquisition to extend the runway to 4,000 metres (4,400 yd) in August 2016.

=== Phase I & Phase II ===
The Phase I expansion period is from 2016–17 to 2025–26. It includes a 4,000 metres (4,400 yd) runway extension, a full-length taxiway, commissioning of a fuel farm, an aviation academy etc. and developing city side facilities. Works for the Phase-I expansion are already progressing. A cargo terminal and cargo complex which was initially in Phase-II has been shifted to Phase I and is under construction. The Phase II expansion will happen from 2026–27 to 2045–46. It includes another runway and a dedicated domestic terminal at Veliamparamba, and a long flyover to link it with Moorkhanparamba.

== Management ==
Kannur International Airport is the second greenfield airport to be built on a public private partnership (PPP) platform in Kerala. The airport is managed by Kannur International Airport Ltd.(KIAL), a public company. Venu V, IAS, is the current managing director of KIAL. Chief minister of Kerala holds the post of chairman. The principal investor in KIAL, the Government of Kerala, owns 32.86% of the company's shares. Other shareholders are: 22.54% by State and Central Public Sector Undertakings, 9.39% by Airports Authority of India, 35.21% by others, including QIBs, Individuals, Companies, Cooperative, Banks/Societies, and other legal entities as approved by the Board of Directors from time to time.

=== Passenger terminal ===
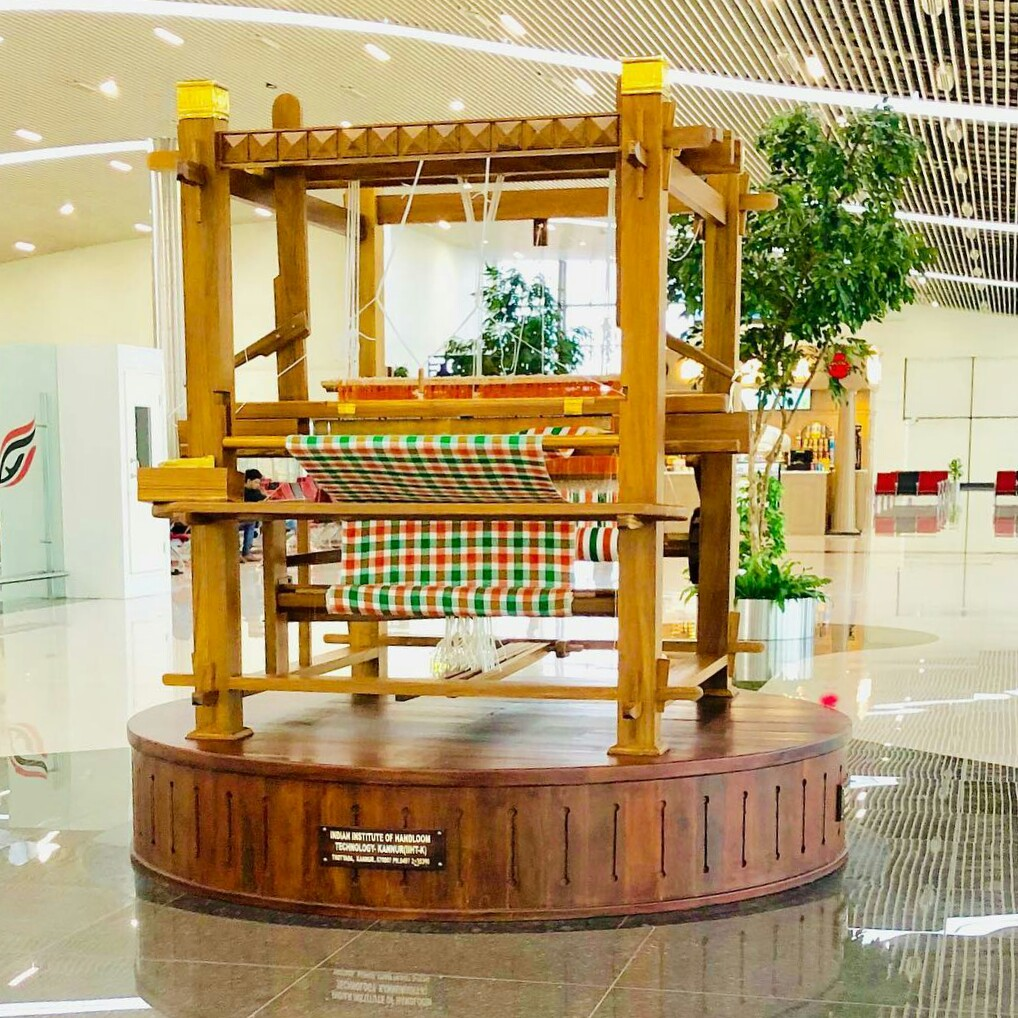
Handloom model at the departure area

The airport has an integrated passenger terminal for both international and domestic travellers with a floor area of 97,000 m^{2} (1,040,000 sq ft) for arrival and departure separately. It is able to handle up to 2,000 passengers during peak hours with its unique swing facility. It features six aerobridges with 48 check-in counters, 32 emigration counters, 16 customs counters, four conveyor belts and access control inside the terminal. The passenger terminal uses the swing facility. The international gates are used for domestic operations when there are no international flights. The passenger terminal building has a double skin aluminium roofing system and efficient LED lighting adopting the green building concept.

=== Cargo terminal ===
A cargo terminal complex having an 8-floor space of 32,000 m^{2} (340,000 sq ft) will also be constructed.

== Airlines and destinations ==
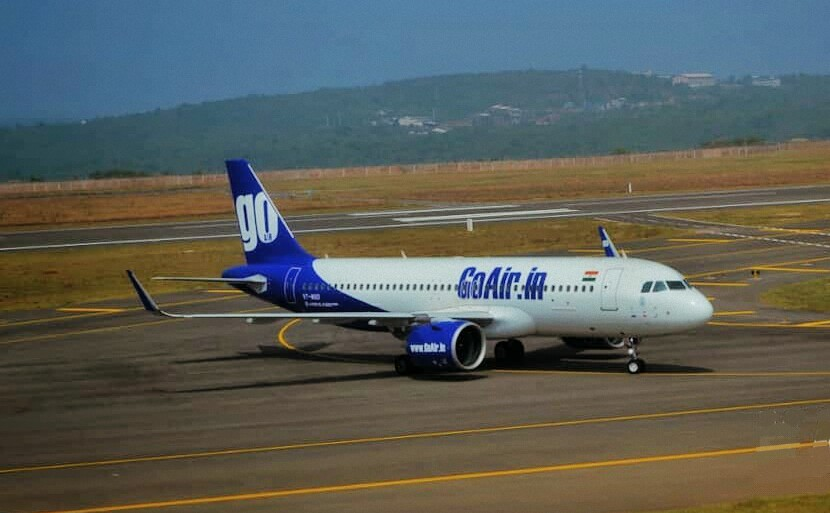
A GoAir Airbus A320neo taxiing to the airport's apron

Airlines	Destinations
Air India Express	Abu Dhabi, Bahrain, Bengaluru, Dammam, Doha, Dubai–International, Jeddah, Kuwait City, Muscat, Ras Al Khaimah, Riyadh, Sharjah, Thiruvananthapuram
IndiGo	Abu Dhabi, Bengaluru, Chennai, Delhi, Doha, Fujairah, Hyderabad, Kochi, Mumbai, Navi Mumbai,

== Operational infrastructure ==
Kannur Airport has one runway, 07/25 which is 3,050 by 45 metres (10,007 by 148 feet). Runway 07/25 orientation permits an obstacle-free approach. Runway 25's end will have Category I approach lighting and the 07 end will have simple approach lighting. The runway is planned to be extended to 4,000 metres (13,000 ft) as part of the Phase I expansion. Land acquisition of about 260 acres is underway for this purpose. The runway will have a full-length parallel taxiway and its apron will allow 20 wide-bodied aircraft to park simultaneously.

The airport's air navigation services and air traffic control are handled by the Airports Authority of India (AAI). The ATC tower is equipped with Doppler variable omni range and distance measuring equipment, air traffic system automation, instrument landing system, voice recorder, and a GPS clock system. It has VHF communication facilities and equipment for obtaining radar signals from the Cochin International Airport. The tower is 30 metres (98 ft) high and has a floor area of 1,923 square metres (20,700 ft^{2}).

Various weather monitoring, weather forecasting and alert systems are being installed at the airport by the India Meteorological Department (IMD). The Automated Weather Observing System (AWOS) for weather observations, is supplemented by climatological data, weather forecasting and aerodrome warning from IMD. The IMD will send minute-by-minute weather updates in the form of audio messages directly to pilots, instead of passing the information manually to the ATC and through them to the pilot. The information could include wind speed, gusts and direction, temperature and dew point, visibility, density, altitude, thunderstorm, lightning etc. ensuring smooth aircraft operation.

The airport will have a 300 metres (330 yd)-long, 90 metres (98 yd)-wide runway end safety area (RESA) on both ends of the runway. This reduces the risk of casualties and damage to aircraft in the event of an undershoot, overshoot or excursion from the runway. The RESA is protected with a Reinforced Earth wall. The airport will have an isolation bay towards the 07 side. An isolation bay, with a diameter of 125 metres (137 yd) is a special parking space created for an aircraft facing an exigency like hijack or bomb threat.

Ground handling in the airport is managed by Air India Air Transport Services Ltd. (AI-ATSL).

=== Aviation fuel farm ===
The airport has a 28,000 square metres (33,000 yd^{2}) fuel farm constructed and operated as a joint venture company floated by KIAL and Bharat Petroleum Corporation Ltd. (BPCL) — the BPCL-KIAL Fuel Farm Private Ltd. The Rs. 17-crore fuel farm has underground tanks for aviation fuel storage and will provide fuel for aircraft operating from the airport. BPCL has a Rs. 170-crore stake in KIAL.

=== MRO ===
Kannur Airport has an aircraft maintenance, repair and overhaul (MRO) facility. A large maintenance terminal is dedicated for this. The facility caters to both narrow and wide-bodied aircraft. The MRO undertakes maintenance work on aircraft and their components, such as jet engines, landing gear, air frames and components and involves line maintenance and hangars.

=== Enclaves ===
The airport has an Indian Navy air enclave on ten acres of land. The location is a priority for the Navy since the Ezhimala Naval Academy, the only naval academy in India, and the largest in Asia, is just 60 kilometres (37 mi) away from the airport. Ezhimala is also a strategic defense location. The original demands for transfer of the ten acres of airport land to the Navy included having a representative from Southern Naval Command on KIAL's board of directors, to set up the enclave. This was dropped by the Navy. The land was transferred to the Navy on a long-term lease against token rent for establishing the enclave.

The Indian Air Force has a presence at the airport with a separate enclave set up on ten acres of land. Defence officials approved the enclave in view of the airport's strategic location. Kannur Cantonment, the only Army Cantonment in Kerala is 30 kilometres (19 mi) away from the airport. The land provided on a long-term lease, against a token rent, is located beside the operational apron of the airport. Work on the enclave's hangars and administrative buildings is underway.

An enclave has been set up by the Indian Coast Guard (ICG) at the Kannur airport to augment air surveillance along the coast. India's first Coast Guard Academy is located at Azhikkal, 36 kilometres (22 mi) from the airport. Considering this, the strategic location and the proximity to the coast of the airport the ICG had sought 20 acres of airport land. The KIAL board authorized the airport's managing director to provide 10 acres on a long-term lease against token rent to establish the enclave.

=== Aviation academy ===
An aviation academy has been set up in the airport by the Rajiv Gandhi Aviation Academy and Technology on two acres of land allotted for it. The institute offers students courses in aeronautics and provides flight training.

=== HAL helicopter manufacturing base ===
Hindustan Aeronautics Limited (HAL) had sought airport land from KIAL to have a manufacturing base for helicopters. 80 acres of land had been allotted by the board to HAL in 2014. The HAL complex will include helicopter manufacturing for exporting, helicopter maintenance and repair, and a helicopter pilot training centre.

== Security and Law Enforcement ==
The airport comes under the jurisdiction of Mattanur Airport Police station under Kannur City Police established on 12 August 2018. The jurisdictional area coming inside the airport compound wall in Morkanparamaba in Keezhallur Panchayat and area of Kallerikkara ward of Mattanur Municipality coming inside the Airport compound wall. The whole area of the station is owned by KIAL. The magisterial jurisdiction of the station is Judicial First Class Magistrate Court, Mattanur.

== Ground transport ==
Pre-paid taxi service is available at the airport round the clock. KSRTC provides service to various destinations in Kannur, Kasaragod, Kozhikode and Malappuram districts from the airport. The nearest town is at Mattannur situated 5 km (3.1 mi) away from the airport which has bus connectivity to various parts of Kannur district, Kodagu district and Mysore. Autorickshaw service is available at the airport to Mattannur. The closest railway stations are at Thalassery (25 km [16 mi]) and Kannur (27 km [17 mi]) from the airport. As of 2026, there is no Uber or Ola Cabs service facility from the airport.

=== Future developments ===
The proposed Kannur-Mysore National Highway under Bharatmala project, passes through Airport provides easy access to the important cities and towns in Kerala and Karnataka states.

Kerala government has given node for developing Mattanur-Kootupuzha road, Thalassery-Anjarakandy-Mattanur road, Kuttiady-Panoor-Mattanur road, Mananthavady-Mattanur road, Kannur-Airport roads for better connectivity.

== See also ==
- Kozhikode International Airport
- Mangalore International Airport
- Cochin International Airport
- Thiruvananthapuram International Airport
- List of airports in Kerala
- Airports in India
- Payyanur
