= Mahé River =

Mahe River (Mayyazhipuzha)
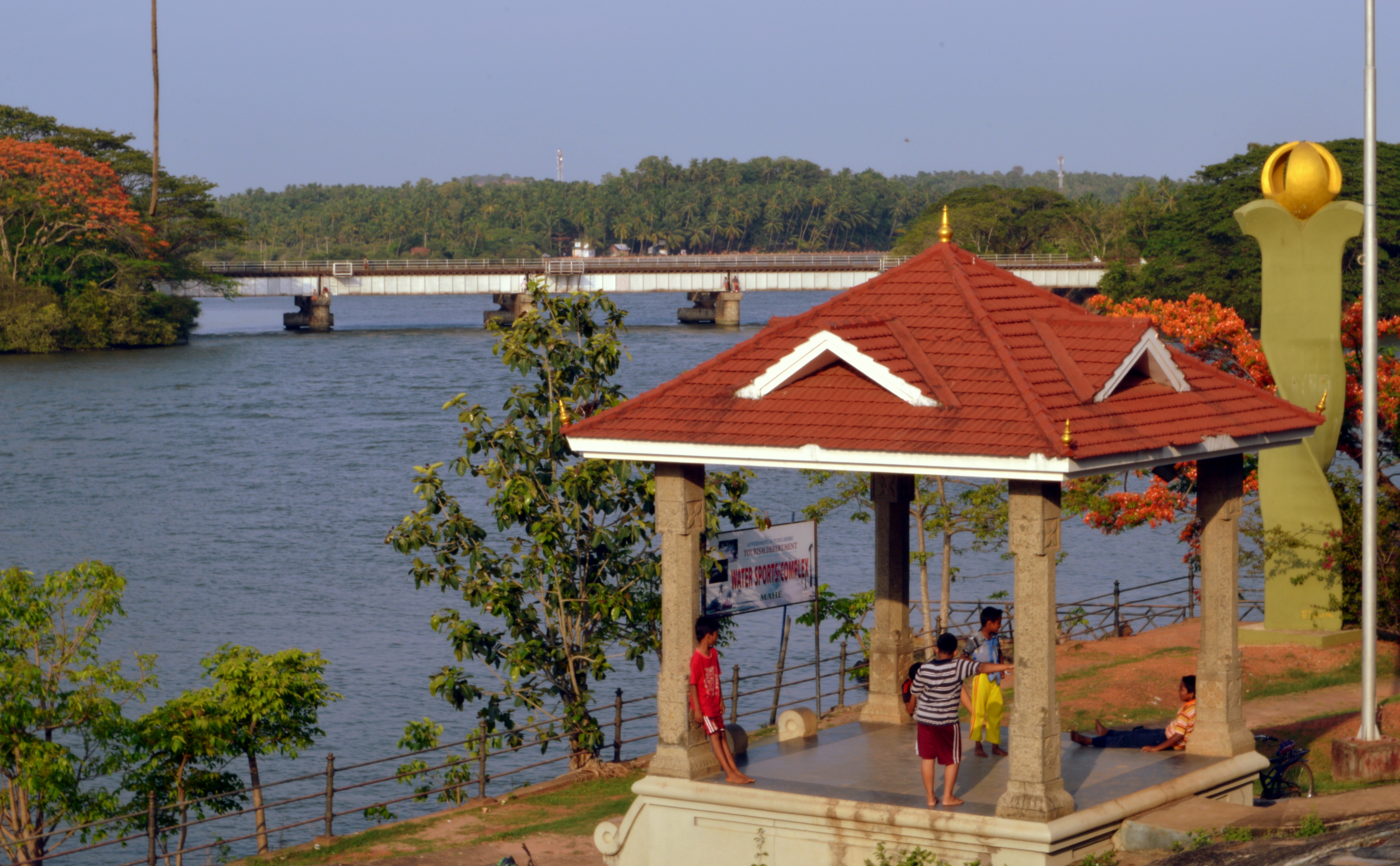

Location
- Country: India
- State: Kerala
- Districts: Kozhikode, Kannur, Mahe
- Towns: Nadapuram, Peringathur, Mahe

Physical characteristics
- Source: Vanchimagate hills, Western Ghats
  - location: Wayanad district - Kozhikode district border, Kerala, India
  - coordinates: 11°44′15″N 75°50′10″E
  - elevation: 910 m (2,990 ft)
- Mouth: Arabian Sea
  - location: Mahe, Mahe district, Puducherry, India
  - coordinates: 11°42′04″N 75°32′12″E
  - elevation: 0 m (0 ft)
- Length: 54 km (34 mi)
- Basin size: 394 km^{2} (152 sq mi)

The Mahe River (/ˈmɑːheɪ/) natively Mayyazhipuzha (Malayalam: [mɐjːɐɻipːuɻɐ]) is a river in South India. It flows through the state of Kerala and the coastal exclave of Mahe in Puducherry.

The Mahe River originates in the slopes of the Western Ghats part of the Wayanad district and passes through the taluks of Mananthavady, Vatakara and Thalassery before it joins the Arabian sea at Mahe about 6 km (3.7 mi) south of Thalassery. The river flows through the hilly eastern towns and villages of the Kozhikode district like Vilangad, Vanimal, Jathiyeri and Nadapuram. Then, the river enters into the Malabar plains where it flows through several towns, including Parakkadavu, Kadavathur, Peringathur, Eramala, Kunnukara, Kariyad and Peringandoor. The river then flows through the northern boundary of the Union Territory of Mahe and empties into the Arabian Sea.

== Economy ==
There is very little influence on the economy of the region traversed by the river. The river has been used for inland navigation and transportation of articles from interior villages to Mahe and back in the past. The government of Puducherry has planned to build a fishing harbour at the estuary of the river. However, owing to technical reasons, the harbour (which is under construction) is on the beach adjacent to the estuary. To enhance tourist potential of Mahe, a riverside walkway (originating from the Water Sports Complex at Manjakkal, Mahe, on the banks of the river stretching out to the breakwater of the [Fishing Harbour]) is also being built by the government of Puducherry.

== Trivia ==
During the British Raj, the Mahe River was nicknamed the English Channel because it separated British-ruled Thalassery from French-ruled Mahe.

== In popular culture ==
The river is mentioned in M. Mukundan's 1974 magnum opus novel Mayyazhippuzhayude Theerangalil (Malayalam for "On the banks of the Mahe River").

== See also ==
- List of rivers in Kerala
- List of dams and reservoirs in Kerala
- List of rivers in India
