= Kolavelloor =

- Census Town
- Location in Kerala, India
- Coordinates: 11.7788°N 75.6298°E
- Country: India
- State: Kerala
- District: Kannur

Government
  - Body: Kunnothuparamba Panchayat

Area
  - Total: 14.11 km^{2} (5.45 sq mi)

Population (2011)
  - Total: 19,817
  - Density: 1,404/km^{2} (3,638/sq mi)

Languages
  - Official: Malayalam, English
- Time zone: UTC+5:30 (IST)
- PIN: 670693
- ISO 3166 code: IN-KL
- Vehicle registration: KL 58
- Nearest city: Panoor

Kolavelloor is a census town in Kannur district in the Indian state of Kerala.

== Demographics ==
As of 2011 Census, Kolavelloor had a population of 19,817 with 9,110 (46%) males and 10,707 (54%) females. Kolavelloor census town have an area of 14.11 km^{2} (5.45 sq mi) with 4,372 families residing in it. The average sex ratio was 1175 higher than the state average of 1084. 12.1% of the total population was under 6 years of age. Kolavelloor had average literacy of 94.6% higher than the state average of 94%; male literacy was 97% and female literacy was 92.6%.

== Settlements ==
Villages associated with the census town include:

- Thuvakkunnu
- Vilakkottur

== Transportation ==
The national highway passes through Thalassery town. Goa and Mumbai can be accessed on the northern side and Cochin and Thiruvananthapuram can be accessed on the southern side. The road to the east of Iritty connects to Mysore and Bangalore. The nearest railway station is Thalassery on Mangalore-Palakkad line. Trains are available to almost all parts of India subject to advance booking over the internet. There are airports at Mangalore and Calicut. Both of them are international airports but direct flights are available only to Middle Eastern countries.
