= Mathiparamba =

Village in Kannur district, Kerala, India

Mathiparamba is a small village near Peringathur, Thalassery Taluk, Kannur District of Kerala state, India. There is a population of 1500 peoples.

== Geography ==
Mathiparamba is 3 km away from Peringathur and 12 km away from Thalassery. Other important places are Chokly, Pnoor, Pallur.

== Demography ==
Most of the peoples are working in Gulf countries.

== Infrastructure/Amenities ==
There is road passing through Mathiparamba from NH 17 connecting Panoor and Koothuparamba. In Mathiparamba, all facilities like government school, Mosque, Temple, Madrasa, Anganavaadi, Playgrounds, etc. are available. A Primary Health Centre is available in just 1 km.

== Government ==
Mathiparamba is came under two Panchayaths, Kariyad and Chokly. Mathiparamba is the part of Koothuparamba Legislative Constituency and Vatakara Parliament Constituency. The current MLA is K. P Mohanan and MP is Hon. Union Minister for Home Mullapally Ramachandran. And the current member of XIIth ward of Kariyad Panchayth is K. T Reena, and K. T. K Riyas master.

== Transportation ==
The national highway passes through Thalassery town. Goa and Mumbai can be accessed on the northern side and Cochin and Thiruvananthapuram can be accessed on the southern side. The road to the east of Iritty connects to Mysore and Bangalore. The nearest railway station is Thalassery on Mangalore-Palakkad line. Trains are available to almost all parts of India subject to advance booking over the internet. There are airports at Mangalore and Calicut. Both of them are international airports but direct flights are available only to Middle Eastern countries.
