= Pilgrimage centres in Kannur district =

Kannur District or Cannanore District is one of the 14 districts in the state of Kerala, India. The town of Kannur is the district headquarters, and gives the district its name. The old name 'Cannanore' is the anglicised form of the Malayalam name Kannur.

- Muthappan temple
- Rajarajeshwara Temple
- Kunnathoor padi
- St. Mary's Forane Church Edoor (Iritty).

== See also ==
- Kannur town
- Kannur district
- Temples of Kerala
