= Velimanam =

Village in Kerala, India

Velimanam (originally Keezhpparambum Chola) is a small village 12 km from Iritty, a migrant hub in Kannur district, Kerala, India.

The village includes St. Sebastian’S Church, St. Sebastians HSS, St.Sebastian’s High School and LP, UP schools.St. Gregorios Orthodox Church affiliated with the Malankara Orthodox Syrian Church.

== History ==
Remnants of Neolithic civilization exist in and around the village. The indigenous people of the area- Paniyas, Malayalars, and Kurichyas- have lived there since ancient times. Keezhppally, Meppally, and other places exhibit the Buddhist past of the area, which is within the Coorg region of Karnataka. The history of modern-day Velimanam started with the migration of Syrian Christians from Travencore from the late 1940s until the 1970s.

== Schools ==
The establishment of Sree Ramananda Vilasam School in 1950 by the late M. Kunhiraman was the first attempt at modernization of the community. Fr. Joseph Kanjirakkattukunnel, Fr. Francis Valayil, and Rev. Mullanmada also established schools and other religious institutions in the village. In 1954, St. Sebastian Church was founded, and the village was renamed Velimanam by the late Devasia Koothanadiyil and Mathew Adakkamundayil.

The village now hosts St. Sebastian Higher Secondary School, a high school, two banks, a post office, Krishi Bhavan, and a village extension office.

== Transport ==
The national highway passes through Kannur town. Mangalore and Mumbai can be accessed on the northern side and Cochin and Thiruvananthapuram can be accessed on the southern side. The road to the east of Iritty connects to Mysore and Bangalore. The nearest railway station is Kannur on Mangalore-Palakkad line. The nearest airport is 26 km away, Kannur International Airport, Mattannur.
