= Kannadiparamba =

- Census Town
- Location in Kerala, India Kannadiparamba (India)
- Coordinates: 11.935°N 75.403°E
- Country: India
- State: Kerala
- District: Kannur

Government
  - Type: Panchayati raj (India)
  - Body: Narath Grama Panchayat

Area
  - Total: 8.93 km^{2} (3.45 sq mi)

Population (2011)
  - Total: 13,677
  - Density: 1,530/km^{2} (3,970/sq mi)

Languages
  - Official: Malayalam, English
- Time zone: UTC+5:30 (IST)
- PIN: 670604
- ISO 3166 code: IN-KL
- Vehicle registration: KL-13

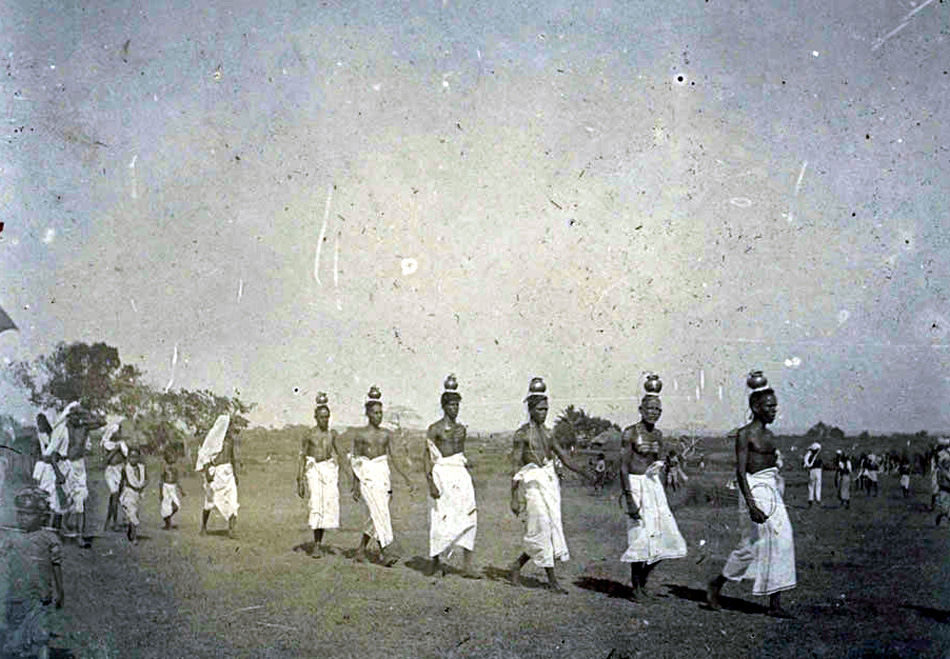
Visitors to Kannadiparamba temple, 1902

Kannadiparamba is a census town in Kannur district in the Indian state of Kerala.

== Location ==
Kannadiparamba is located about 5.5 - 6.5 km from Kannur town. The village is the part of Narath Grama Panchayat.

== Temples ==
Kannadiparamba Sree Dharma Shastha Temple, one of the oldest and famous temples in Malabar is in Kannadiparamba.

== Transportation ==
The national highway passes through Valapattanam town. Goa and Mumbai can be accessed on the northern side and Cochin and Thiruvananthapuram can be accessed on the southern side. The road to the east of Iritty connects to Mysore and Bangalore. The nearest railway station is Kannur on Mangalore-Palakkad line. Trains are available to almost all parts of India subject to advance booking over the internet. There are airports at Mattanur, Mangalore and Calicut. All of them are international airports but direct flights are available only to Middle Eastern countries.

== Demographics ==
As of 2011 India Census, Kannadiparamba had a population of 13,677 which constitutes 6,056 (44.3%) males and 7,621 (55.7%) females. Kannadiparamba census town spreads over an area of 8.93 km^{2} (3.45 sq mi) with 2,791 families residing in it. The male female sex ratio was 1,258 higher than state average of 1,084. In Kannadiparamba, 12.7% of the population is under 6 years of age. Kannadiparamba had an overall literacy of 93.1% higher than national average of 59% and lower than state average of 94%. The male literacy stands at 96.7% and female literacy was 90.5%.

== Religion ==
As of 2011 census, Kannadiparamba census town had total population of 13,677, which constitutes 53.37% Hindus, 43.53% Muslims, 2.74% Christians and 0.36% others.

== Weavers ==
Kannadiparamba has a long tradition of handloom weaving. Since around 2008-2009, the local handloom industry has faced difficulties, including the closure of weaving companies and a decline in employment. These changes have affected the livelihood of people who were traditionally employed in this sector with some former weavers being unemployed.
