= Onakkunnu =

Village in Kerala, India

Onakkunnu is a village of the panchayat town Karivellur in Kannur district, Kerala, India. Its post code is 670521.

== Temples ==
There is a notable temple to the Hindu god Siva in the village.

== Transportation ==
The national highway passes through Perumba junction. Goa and Mumbai can be accessed on the northern side and Cochin and Thiruvananthapuram can be accessed on the southern side. The road to the east of Iritty connects to Mysore and Bangalore. The nearest railway station is Payyanur on Mangalore-Palakkad line. Trains are available to almost all parts of India subject to advance booking over the internet. There are airports at Kannur, Mangalore and Calicut. All of them are international airports but direct flights are available only to Middle Eastern countries.
