= St. Mary's Forane Church, Edoor =

St. Mary's Forane Church Edoor
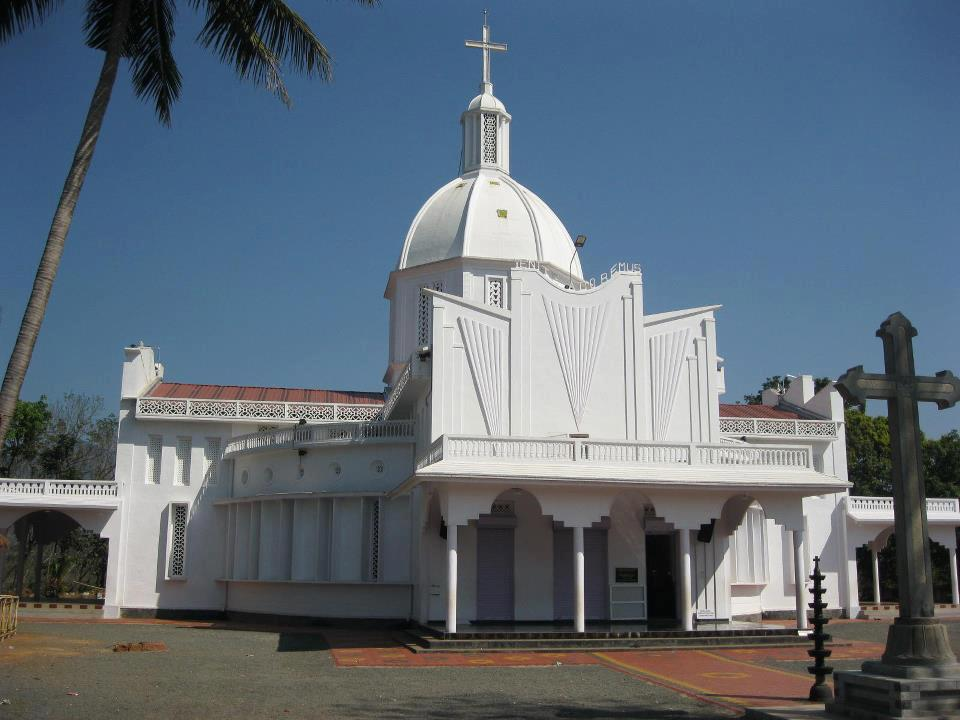
- St. Mary's Forane Church Edoor

- 11.998038°N 75.726163°E
- Location: Edoor, Iritty, Kerala
- Country: India
- Denomination: Syro-Malabar Catholic Church
- Tradition: East Syriac Rite
- Website: stmarysshrineedoor.com

History
- Founded: 1946
- Dedication: Saint Mary

Architecture
- Architectural type: Modern

Administration
- District: Kannur
- Archdiocese: Thalassery
- Parish: St. Mary's Forane Church, Edoor

Clergy
- Archbishop: Joseph Pamplany
- Vicar: Thomas Vadakkemuriyil

St. Mary's Archi Episcopal Marian Pilgrim Forane Church Edoor is one of the oldest churches and a notable Marian pilgrim centre in Kannur district of Kerala. It is near Iritty, the eastern town of Kannur district. This church is the first church in the name of St. Mary under the archdiocese of Thalassery. It is also the largest parish in the archdiocese. It is situated about 6.5 kilometres from the town of Iritty, which is also known as 'The Coorg valley in the God's own country'.

== Basic Information ==
Edoor town is a small marketplace for the farmer communities of the surrounding regions. This place is well-connected to any part of Kannur and other parts of Kerala by road.

== History ==
This parish was established in 1946. In its initial times, it was under the Latin Catholic Diocese of Kozhikode. Later, it came under the Syro-Malabar Catholic Archdiocese of Thalassery. In those times, the members of the parish were the Christian people who had migrated from Travancore. In 1970, the new church was built.

== Architectural Features ==
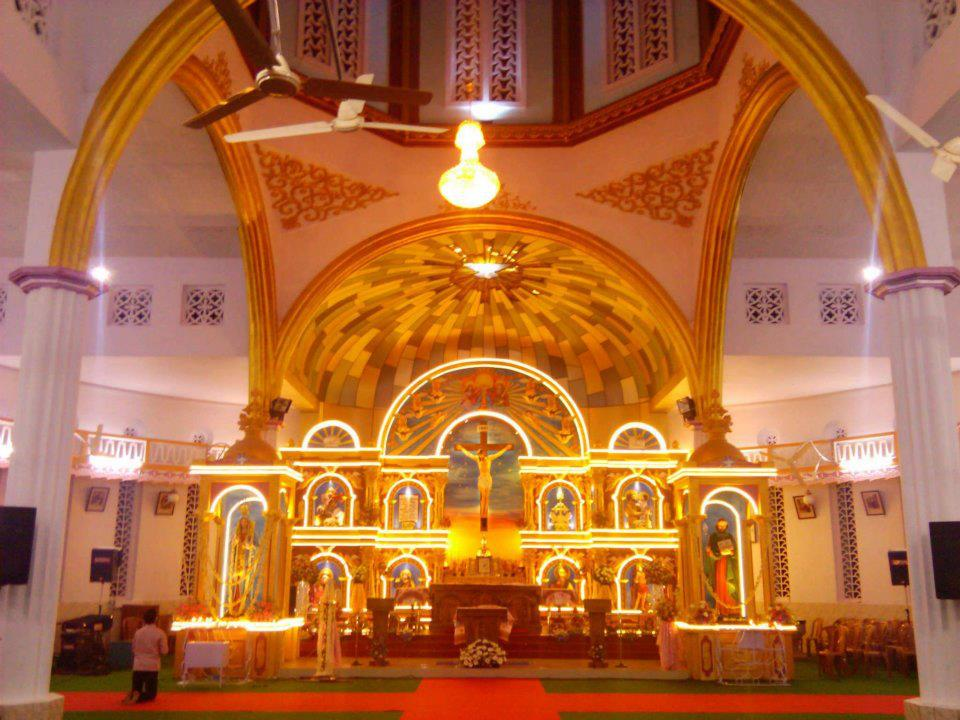
The interior of 'St. Mary's Forane Church Edoor' with a far view of the altar.

The church is in a circular shape and it has a dome in the centre. As it is circular, it has a large area and a wide angle of viewing the altar. It is also one of the largest churches in Malabar. The altar of this church was renovated in 2012, which creates a heavenly feeling in our mind. The altarpieces include the sculptures of various saints. The church has entrances from three directions; viz. West, South and North. Above the main entrance which is from the south, we can see a Latin text: "VENITE ADOREMUS", meaning Come, Let us worship. Above the entrance from the south, we can see the text: "AVE MARIA", and above the northern entrance we can see the text: "MY LORD, MY GOD", which is a declaration by St. Thomas, who is the apostle of India and the father of the Syro-Malabar Church.

== Special Features ==
- The major attraction here is the presence of Mother Mary, The Immaculate. Here is a statue of Mother Mary which may not be seen anywhere else. The people here call it as 'Edooramma (എടൂരമ്മ)', meaning 'The Mother of Edoor'.
- Another feature of this church is the wooden statue of crucified Jesus. Unlike other statues, here we can see Jesus crucified on 'four' nails.
- Unlike most of the churches in Syro-Malabar Church, this does not have a veil (curtain) in between the 'Madbaha' (altar) and 'Haikala' (the place in the church where people stand).
- The feast of St. Mary is held in the first week of January always. Thus it is also considered as the thanksgiving feast for the New Year. People from various parts of the district including those who belong to other religions come here to celebrate this festival.

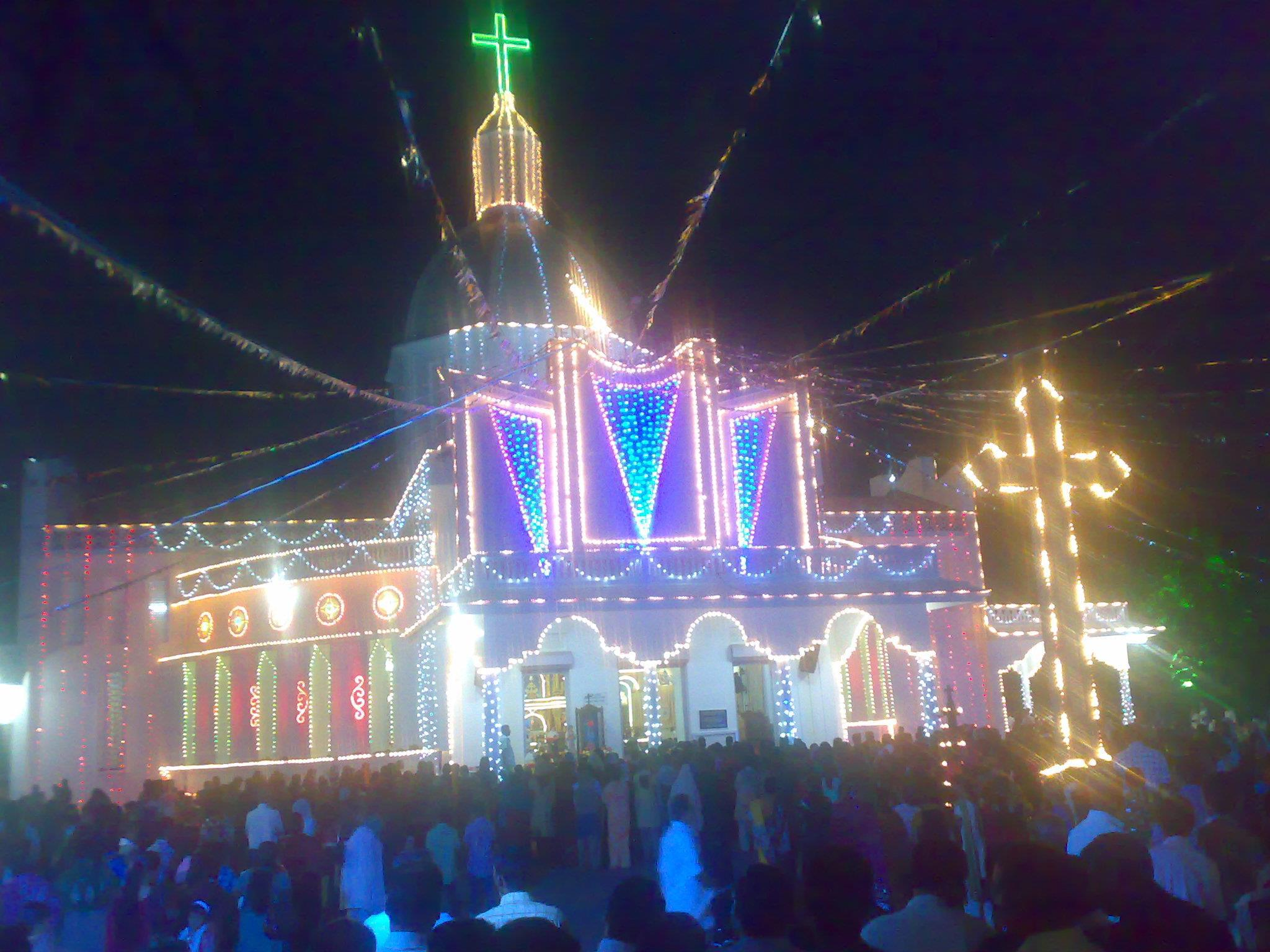
Night View of 'St. Mary's Forane Church Edoor' on the feast day in 2012.

== Edooramma ==
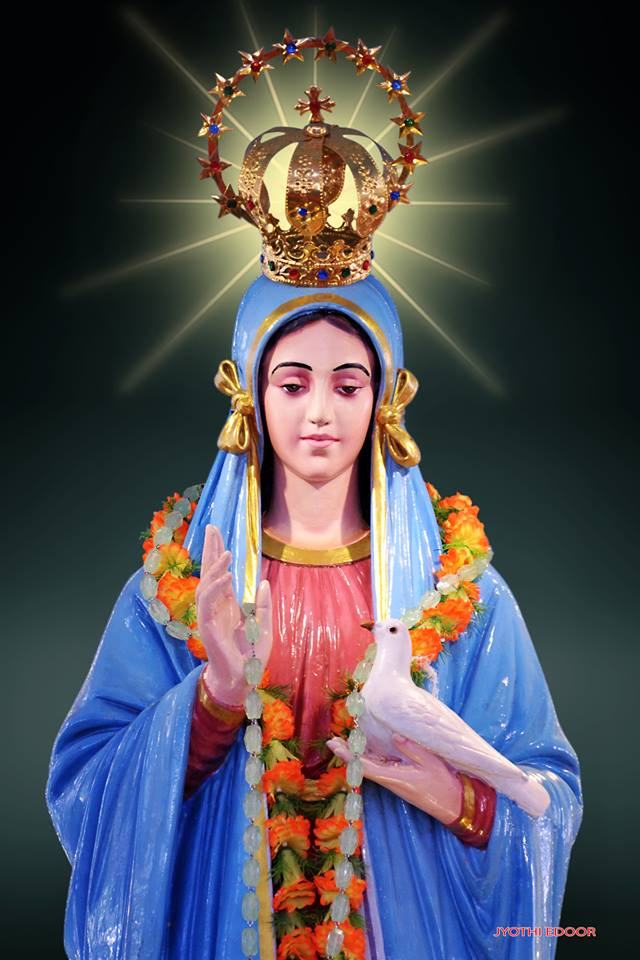
Edooramma, The mother of Edoor.

The presence of St. Mary is the reason for its popularity. The statue of Mother Mary or Edooramma which may not be seen anywhere else is the most beautiful thing in this church.

- Edooramma wearing a blue gown means that 'the gown is the sky which covers Earth. So, the whole Earth is protected by her presence.'
- In the left hand, Edooramma holds a 'white dove', and in her right hand there is a rosary. This means that she spreads peace on earth. It is through the way of rosaries that she spreads the peace.
- She wears a golden crown with twelve stars around it, showing that she is the queen of the Heaven and the Earth.
- There is always a charming smile in her face. It really feels like she is staring at us if we kneel in front of her to pray.

This statue was made in foreign country and brought here by the European Missionaries who were working in this region. Actually it was decided to place it in a nearby church and not in St. Mary's Church. It is said that while it was transported to another church via Edoor, the vehicle had a breakdown when it reached Edoor. As the defect could not be solved soon, they placed the statue in the Edoor Church. This is the story how Edooramma reached here.

== Educational Institutions ==
This church has played a role in the educational landscape of the region. St. Mary's LP School, established in 1946, holds the distinction of being the oldest school in the area. Following this, St. Mary's UP School was founded in 1949, providing primary education. Subsequently, St. Mary's High School was established in 1957, and in 1998, St. Mary's Higher Secondary School expanded opportunities for higher education in the region. Today, St. Mary's Higher Secondary School integrates primary, secondary, and higher secondary education under one roof. Additionally, the church, through its leadership at CMC Convent, facilitated the establishment of St. Treesa’s Nursery School in 1972 and Vikas Bhavan Special School for disabled children in 1984. Vikas Bhavan Special School is among the few specialized schools in Kerala.

== Parishes Under Edoor Forane ==
1. St. Thomas Church Karikottakkari
2. St. Sebastian's Church Velimanam
3. St. Mary's Church Mangode
4. St. Mary's Church Uruppumkutty
5. St. Sebastian's Church Chedikulam
6. Bl. Chavara Kuriakose Elias Church Keezhpally
7. St. Sebastian's Church Vattiyara
8. St. Joseph Church Edappuzha

== Major Institutions in the parish ==
- CMC Convent
- Vikas Bhavan Special School
- St. Treesa's Nursery School
- St. Mary's LP School
- St. Mary's Higher secondary School
- St. Mary's Sunday School
- Alphonse Bhavan
- Don Bosco Convent
- Sneha Bhavan Orphanage
- Mythree Bhavan Old age Home
- Friends Credit Union (TSSS)
- Carmel Homeo Clinic

== Priests Served in the Parish ==
1.Fr.Kudakkachira Kuriakose(1945–47)
2.Fr.Kuzhikkalathil C.J.Varkey(1947–49)
3.Fr.Kattakkayam Joseph(1949–54)
4.Fr.Elamthuruthiyil Sebastian(1954–59)
5.Fr.Moongammackal Abraham(1959–65)
6.Fr.Kollamparambil Joseph(1965–72)
7.Fr.Koottiyani Peter(1972–77)
8.Fr.Kadukummackal John(1977–80)
9.Fr.Kattackal Zacharias(1980–84)
10.Fr.Kunnapallil Varkey(1984–90)
11.Fr.Kollakombil George(1990–93)
12.Fr.Kavalakkattu Kuriakose(1993–99)
13.Fr.Purayidam Antony(1999-2005)
14.Fr.Emmanuel Poovathinkal(2005-2010)
15. Fr. Andrews Thekkel (2010-2016)
16. Fr. Antony Muthukunnel from 2016-
