= Kaithery =

Kaithery Kaitheri
- village
- Location in Kerala, India Kaithery (India)
- Coordinates: 11°51′0″N 75°34′0″E
- Country: India
- State: Kerala
- District: Kannur
- Elevation: 63 m (207 ft)

Population
  - Total: ~1,000

Languages
  - Official: Malayalam, English
- Time zone: UTC+5:30 (IST)
- Telephone code: 0490
- ISO 3166 code: IN-KL
- Vehicle registration: KL-58
- Literacy: 100%

Kaithery, or Kaitheri, is a village in Mangattidam panchayat in Kannur district of Kerala. It is located on Kuthuparamba - Mananthavady road, about 5 km from Kuthuparamba.

== Etymology ==
" Kaithery " Name derives from "Kai" a Malayalam word that means "Hand" "thery/tharuvin" (Malayalam Word) means giving (hand shakes).

== Geography ==
Kaithery is located on the southern portion of Kannur district, to the east of Kerala State Highway 30.

== Temples ==
Kaithery Ramapuram temple, Kaithery Bhagavathi Temple, pootheeyocavo temple, muthappan temple and Kaithery Sree Neela Karingali temple are situated here.

== Transportation ==
The national highway passes through Kannur town. Goa and Mumbai can be accessed on the northern side and Cochin and Thiruvananthapuram can be accessed on the southern side. The road to the east of Iritty connects to Mysore and Bangalore. The nearest railway station is Kannur on Mangalore-Palakkad line. Trains are available to almost all parts of India subject to advance booking over the internet. There are airports at Mattanur, Mangalore and Calicut. All of them are international airports but direct flights are available only to Middle Eastern countries.
