= Cheppanool =

Village in Kerala, India

Cheppanool is a small village in the Kurumathur Panchayat, Kannur district in the state of Kerala, India.

== Landmarks ==
One of Cheppanool's landmarks is its public library. The village also contains a public distribution platform operated by the government, known as the Ration shop. The Krishnapillasmarakavayanasala Grandhalayam And Sports Club is an NGO there is libaray in Krishnapilla smaraka vayanshala and libararian name is TV BABURAJ. based in Cheppanool. There is an Akshaya Centre of Cheppanool under the Government of Kerala to offer many of the government services to the public.

The Cheppanool road ends at Mappath Pedika. Cheppanool's vast farmland, which cultivates paddy and seasonal vegetables, starts and ends on the bank of a small river called Karimbam river (Kuttikol river). The river runs from Cheppanool to Parassinikadavu.

== Transport ==
A national highway passes through the town of Taliparamba. Goa and Mumbai can be accessed on the northern side, while Cochin and Thiruvananthapuram can be accessed on the southern side. Taliparamba has a bus station. Buses are available to all parts of Kannur district. The road to the east of Iritty connects to Mysore and Bangalore. Buses to these cities are only available from Kannur, which is 22 km to the south. The nearest railway stations are Kannapuram and Kannur on the Mangalore-Palakkad line. Trains are available to almost all parts of India, subject to advance booking. There are small international airports at Kannur, Mangalore, and Calicut, with direct flights only available to Middle Eastern countries.

== See also ==
- Kannur district
- Kerala
- Taliparamba
