= Vilakkottur =

Village in Kerala, India

Coordinates: 11.7575°N 75.6493°E

Vilakkottur is a small village within the Kannur district of Kerala state, India.

== Places of worship ==
=== Temples ===
The famous Vilakkottur Muthappan Madapura, and Meethal Sree Bhagavathy Temple situated in Vilakkottur.

=== Mosques ===
Quvvathul Islam Madrasa is situated on the roadside (Thuvakkunnu - Vilakkottur road) near Transformer mukk. Vilakkottur Jumua Masjid, Kuniyil Jumua Masjid, and a maddrasa (1st std. to 10th std.) that is controlled by Vilakkottur Jumua Masjid committee are in the village.

== Education ==
- Sreekrishna Vilasam LP (Lower Primary) School
- Vilakkottur LP School, at Naalam mukk
- Vilakkottur UP School

== Transportation ==
The national highway passes through Thalassery town. Goa and Mumbai can be accessed on the northern side and Cochin and Thiruvananthapuram can be accessed on the southern side. The road to the east of Iritty connects to Mysore and Bangalore. The nearest railway station is Thalassery on Mangalore-Palakkad line. Trains are available to almost all parts of India subject to advance booking over the internet. There are airports at Mangalore and Calicut. Both of them are international airports but direct flights are available only to Middle Eastern countries.
