= Muzhappala =

Village in Kerala, India

Muzhappala is a village in Anjarakkandy panchayat, Kannur district, Kerala.

== Economy ==
The village have an agriculture based economy, paddy fields are abundant in this area, and cash crops like cashew nuts and pepper are widely grown in this area, A milk producer's co operative society is also situated.

== Education ==
"Mamba Central Lower Primary school" - A private held Model school established in 1822awarded as best school in the year 2001 is also situated here .

Anjarkkandy Farmers Co Operative bank, Anjarakkandy Milk Society, BEd College, Arabic college, Paddy field are also there.

== Transportation ==
The national highway passes through Kannur town. Goa and Mumbai can be accessed on the northern side and Cochin and Thiruvananthapuram can be accessed on the southern side. The road to the east of Iritty connects to Mysore and Bangalore. The nearest railway station is Kannuron Mangalore-Palakkad line. Trains are available to almost all parts of India subject to advance booking over the internet. There are airports at Mattanur, Mangalore and Calicut. All of them are international airports but direct flights are available only to Middle Eastern countries.
