= Kadavathur =

Kadavathur Kadavathur Desham
- village
- Location in Kerala, India Kadavathur (India)
- Coordinates: 11.7425356°N 75.6270933°E
- Country: India
- State: Kerala
- District: Kannur

Government
  - Type: Panchayati Raj (India)
  - Body: Grama Panchayat
- Demonym(s): Kadavathurkaran, Kadavathurkari, Kadavathurkar

Languages
  - Official: Malayalam, English
- Time zone: UTC+5:30 (IST)
- PIN: 670676
- Telephone code: 0490-
- ISO 3166 code: IN-KL
- Vehicle registration: KL 58 -
- Nearest city: Thalassery
- Literacy: 100%
- Lok Sabha constituency: Vatakara
- Gram Panchayat: Thripangottur

Kadavathur is a village near Thalassery, situated in Kannur district of Kerala state, India.

Kadavu in Malayalam means the bank of a river where there is no bridge and people use country boats to cross the river. A proposed bridge in the region would enable people of Kadavathur to reach Vadakara and Nadapuram without relying on ferry boat services.

== Transportation ==
The national highway passes through Thalassery town. Goa and Mumbai can be accessed on the northern side and Cochin and Thiruvananthapuram can be accessed on the southern side. The road to the east of Iritty connects to Mysore and Bangalore. The nearest railway station is Thalassery on Mangalore-Palakkad line. Trains are available to almost all parts of India subject to advance booking over the internet. There are airports at Mangalore, Kannur and Calicut. All of them are international airports but direct flights are available only to Middle Eastern countries.
