= Vishnumoorthy Theyyam =

Ritual dance in India

Vishnumoorthy Theyyam is a ritual form of dance worship in Kerala and Karnataka, India.

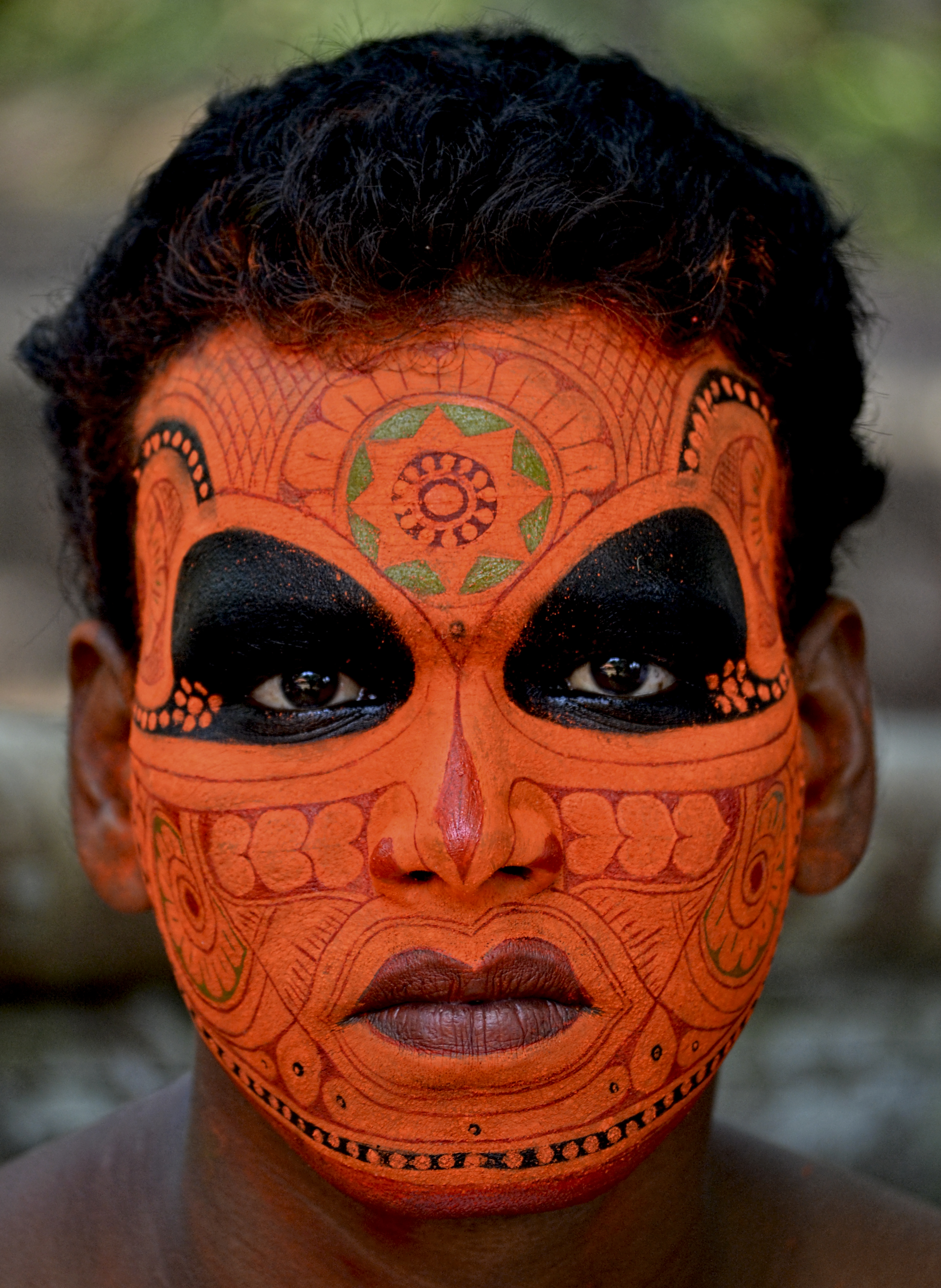
Make up of Vishnumoorthi Theyyam

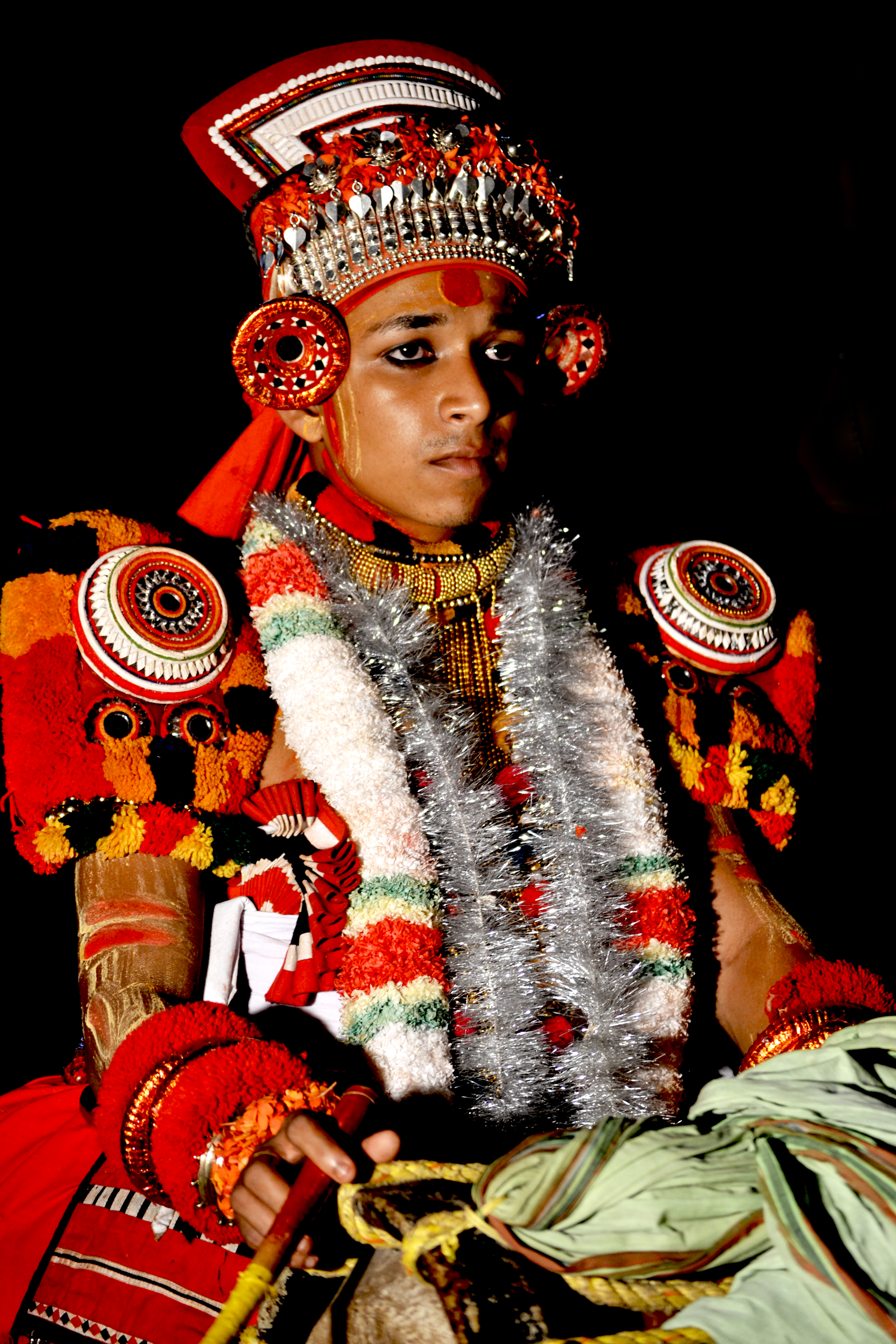
Thottam of Vishnumoorthi Theyyam

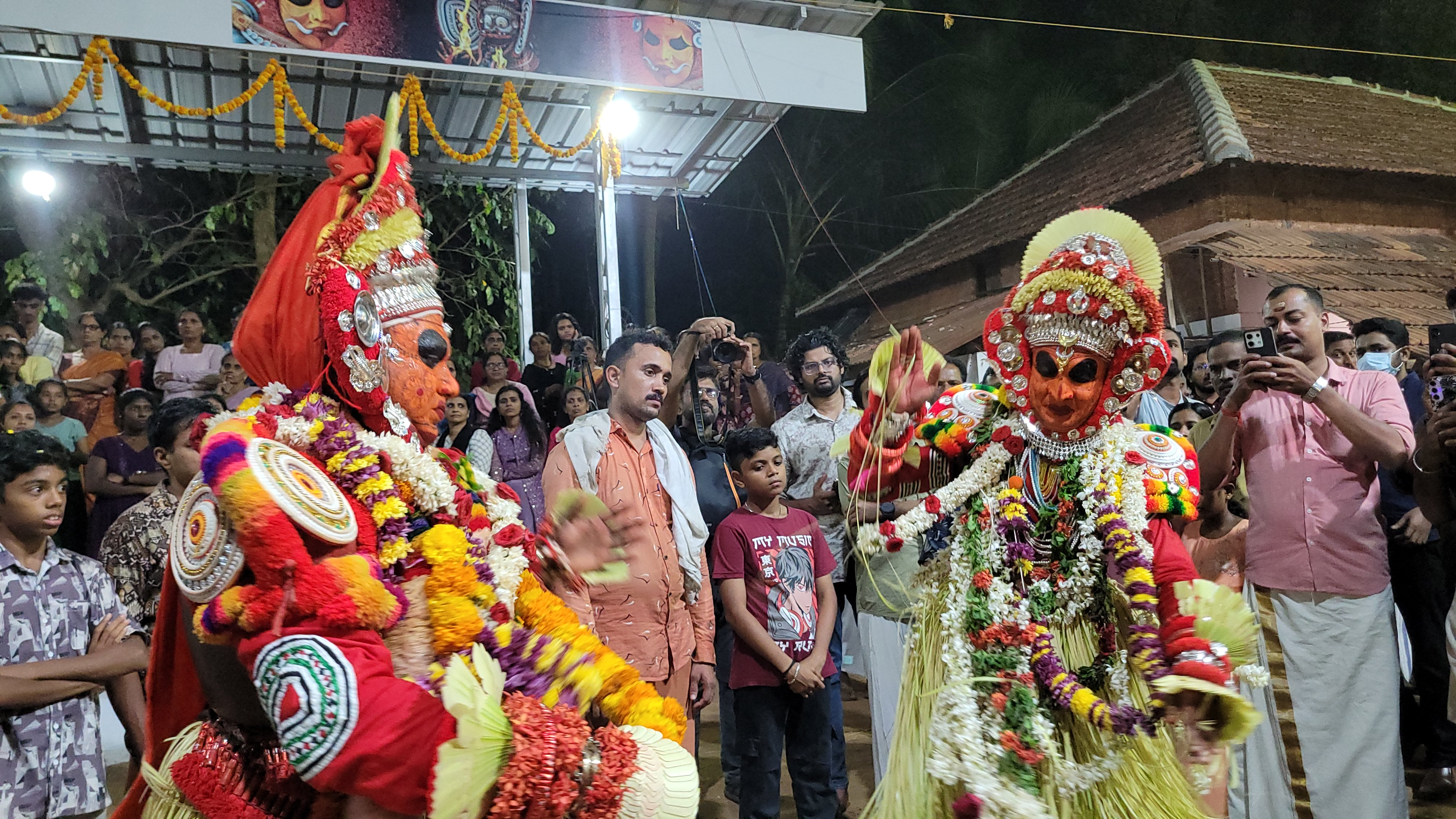
A picture of Vishnumurthi Elamkolam

The Theyyam of Vishnumoorthi is a customary practice at numerous temples, Kavus, and households where Theyyam is a part of the tradition. The idol of Vishnumoorthi is at the Vaikunteshwara temple in Kottapuram, Neeleswaram.
