= Peringathur =

- Census Town
- Location in Kerala, India Peringathur (India)
- Coordinates: 11.713715°N 75.585976°E
- Country: India
- State: Kerala
- District: Kannur

Government
  - Type: Municipal Council
  - Body: Panoor Municipality

Area
  - Total: 20.46 km^{2} (7.90 sq mi)

Population (2011)
  - Total: 40,292
  - Density: 1,969/km^{2} (5,100/sq mi)
- Time zone: UTC+5:30 (IST)
- PIN: 670675
- ISO 3166 code: IN-KL

Peringathur is a census town in Thalassery taluk of Kannur district in the Indian state of Kerala. It is a part of the municipality of Panoor.

== Demographics ==
As of the 2011 Census, Peringathur had a population of 40,292. Males constitute 46% of the population and females were 54%. Peringathur had an average literacy rate of 96%, higher than the state average of 94%: male literacy was 97.6%, and female literacy was 94.6%. In Peringathur, 12.5% of the population was under 6 years of age.

== Etymology ==
It is believed that the name "Peringathur" was derived from Peringalath Ur, which means the place where great wars took place. It gradually came to be known as Peringathur. Kanakamala is a developing tourist spot and the hill ranges of Wayanad and Mahe beach can be viewed from this hilltop.

Peringathur town is situated in the southern border of Kannur district. This town comes under Panoor Municipality and is 6 km away from Mahe. The Mayyazhi river flows through this town. The nearest towns include Panoor, Nadapuram, Kadavathur, Chokli, Thalassery, and Kuthuparamba.

== Transportation ==
The national highway passes through Thalassery town. Goa and Mumbai can be accessed on the northern side and Cochin and Thiruvananthapuram can be accessed on the southern side. The road to the east of Iritty connects to Mysore and Bangalore. The nearest railway station is Thalassery on the Mangalore-Palakkad line.

Trains are available to almost all parts of India subject to advance booking over the internet. Nearby airports include Kannur International Airport, Calicut International Airport, and Mangalore International Airport.
