= Kannur district =

Kannur district Cannanore district
- District
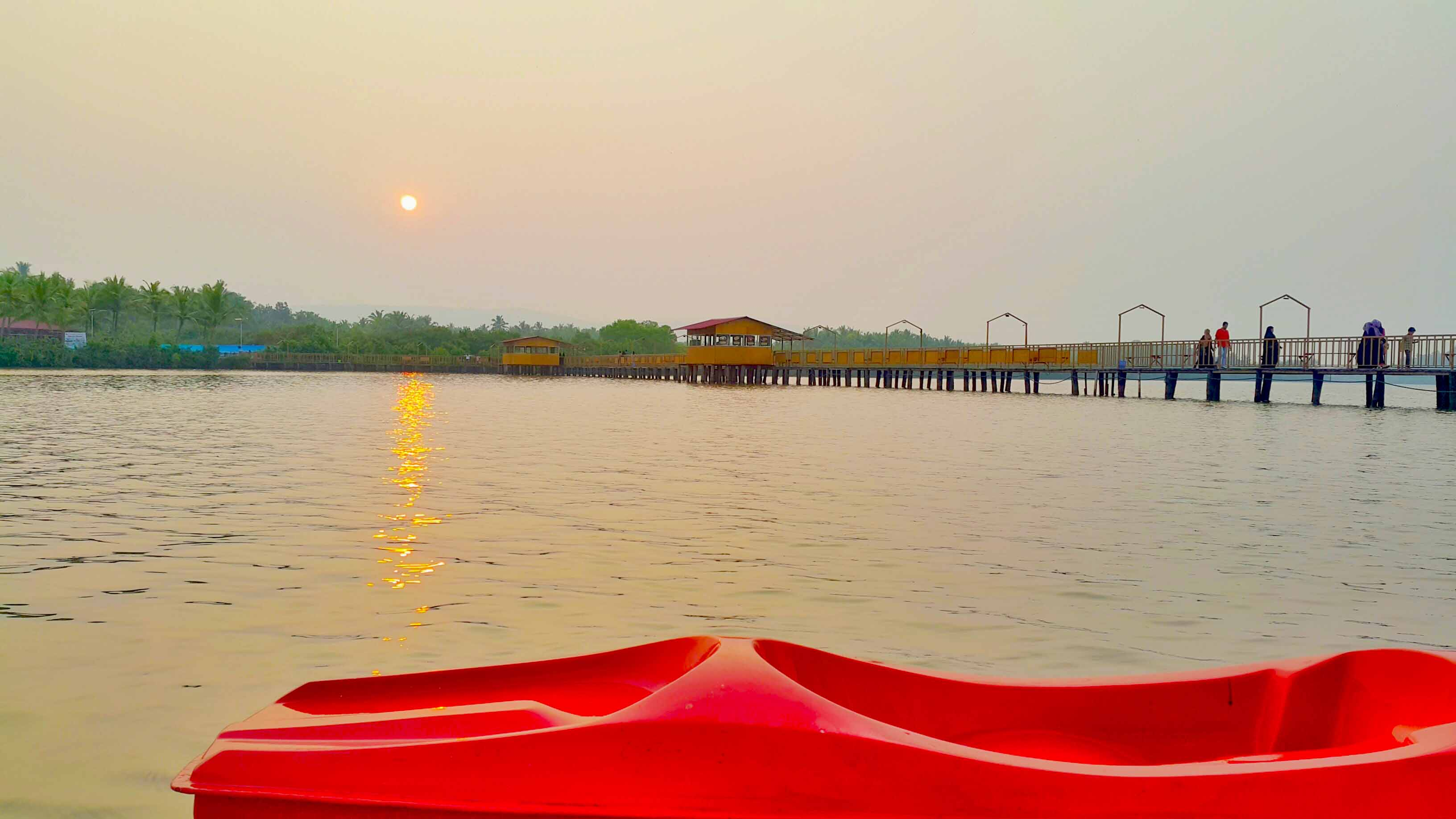
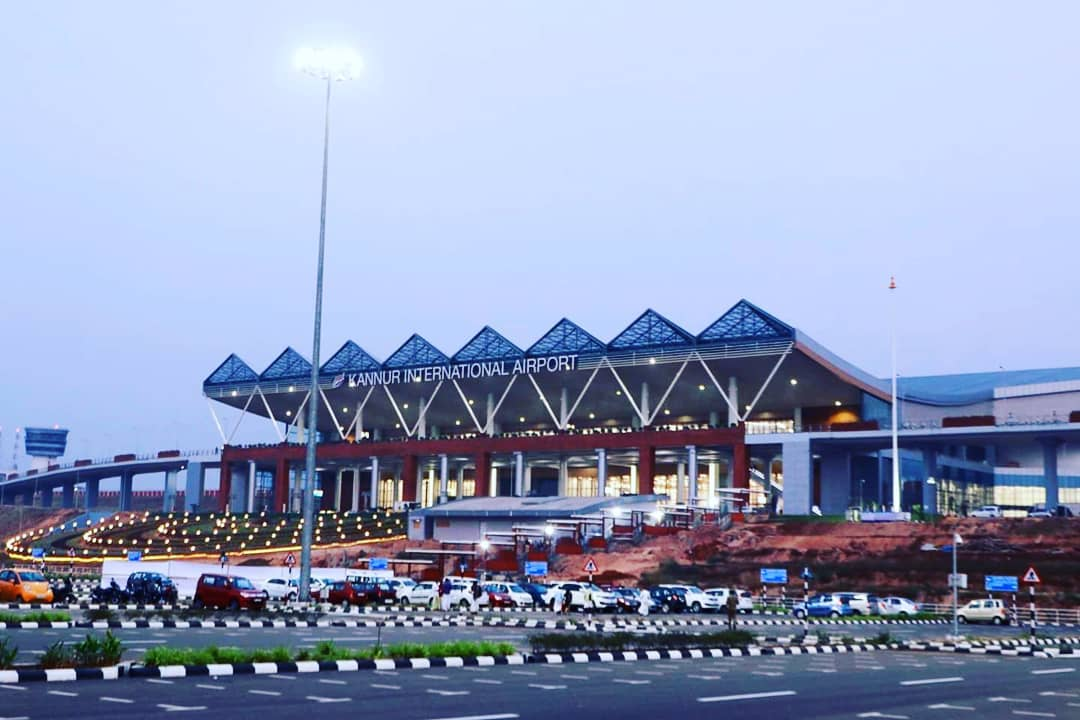
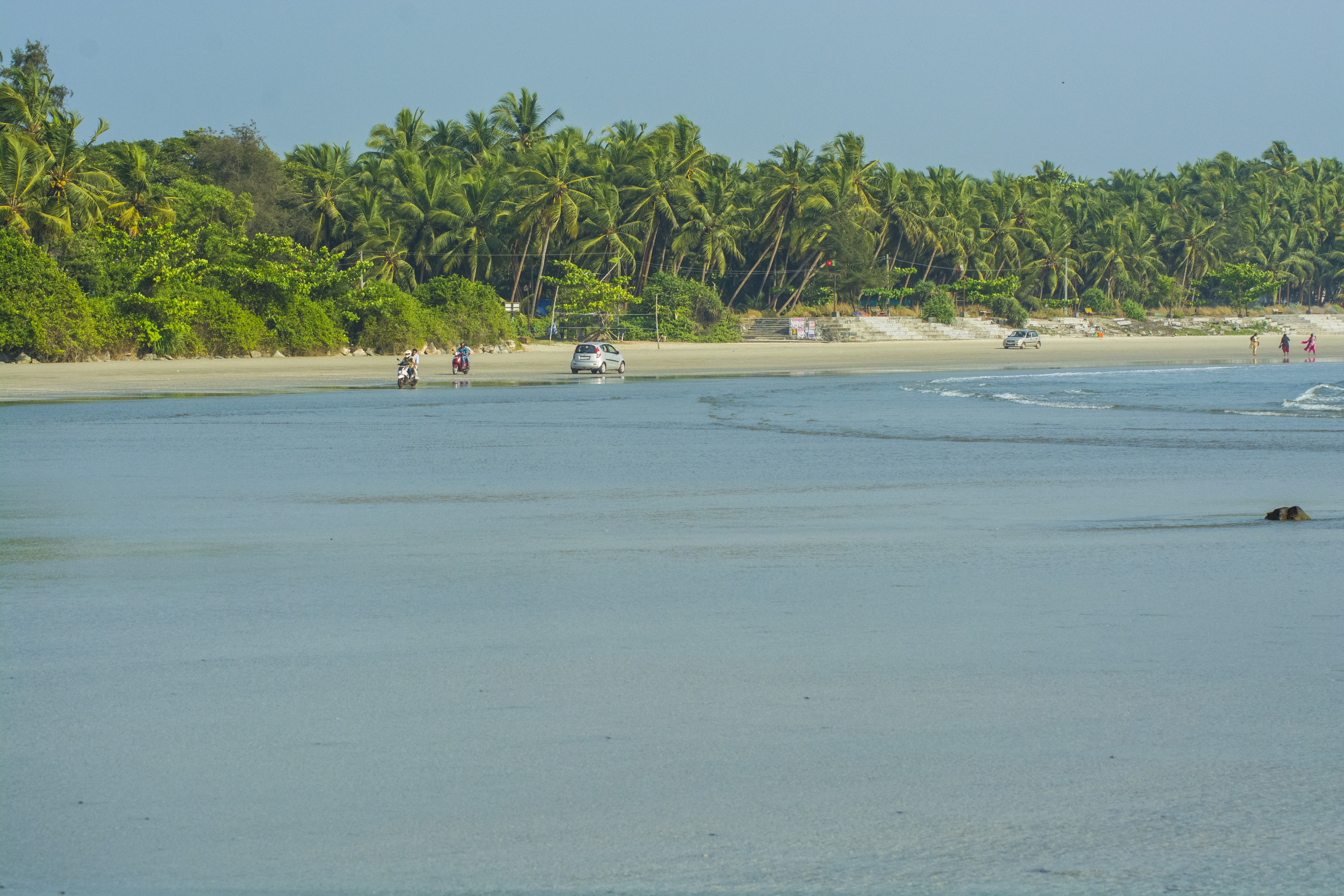
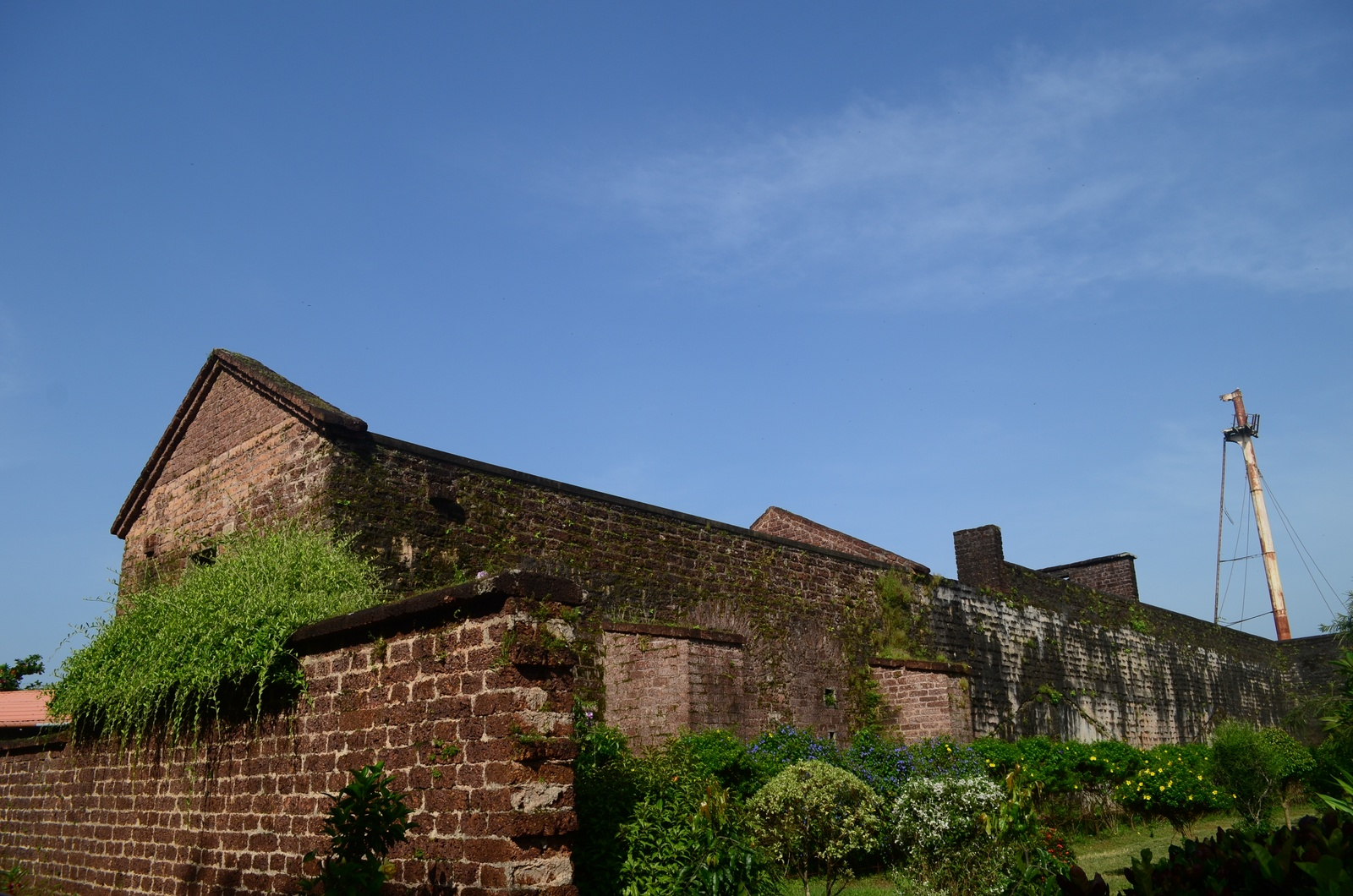
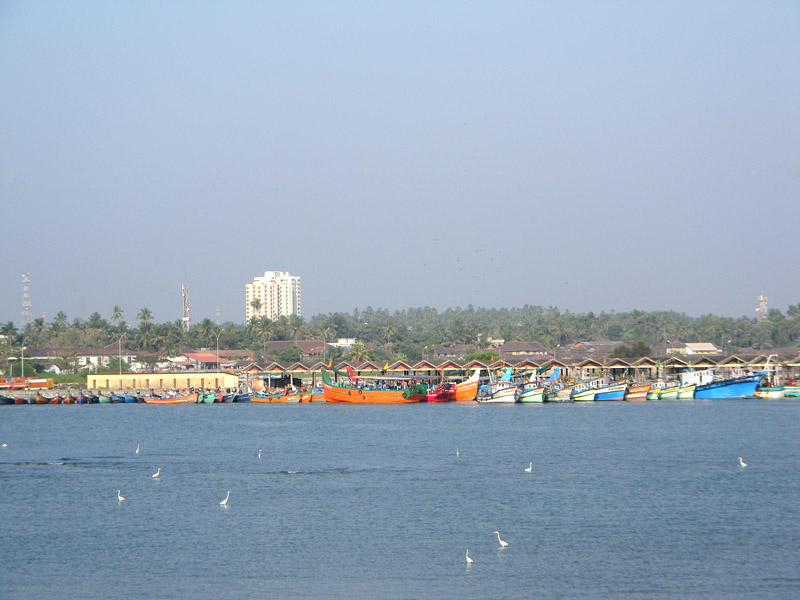
- Clockwise from top: Vayalapra lake, Muzhappilangad Beach, Mappila Bay, St. Angelo Fort, Kannur International Airport.
- Nickname: Crown of Kerala
- Location in Kerala
- Interactive map of Kannur district
- Coordinates: 11.8689°N 75.35546°E
- Country: India
- State: Kerala
- Established: 1957
- Headquarters: Kannur
- Subdivisions: Revenue Divisions: 2: Taliparamba; Thalassery; Taluks: 5: Kannur; Payyanur; Taliparamba; Iritty; Thalassery

Government
  - Body: District administration
  - District in-charge Minister: Sunny Joseph
  - District Collector: Arun K Vijayan. IAS
  - City Police Commissioner: R Ilango, IPS
  - Rural Superintendent of Police: Navneet Sharma, IPS

Area
  - Total: 2,966 km^{2} (1,145 sq mi)
  - Rank: 5th

Population (2018)
  - Total: 2,615,266
  - Density: 882/km^{2} (2,280/sq mi)
- Demonym: Kannurian

Languages
  - Official: Malayalam, English
- Time zone: UTC+5:30 (IST)
- ISO 3166 code: IN-KL-KNR, IN-KL
- Vehicle registration: KL-13 Kannur; KL-58 Thalassery; KL-59 Taliparamba; KL-78 Iritty; KL-86 Payyanur
- HDI (2005): ▲0.783 ( High)
- Sex ratio: 1090 ♂/♀
- Literacy: 95.10%
- Website: kannur.nic.in

Kannur district (pronounced [kɐɳ.ɳuːr]) is one of the 14 districts along the west coast in the state of Kerala, India. The city of Kannur is the district headquarters and gives the district its name. The old name, Cannanore, is the anglicized form of the Malayalam name "Kannur". Kannur district is bounded by Kasaragod District to the north, Kozhikode district to the south, Mahé district to the southwest and Wayanad District to the southeast. To the east, the district is bounded by the Western Ghats, which forms the border with the state of Karnataka (Kodagu district). The Arabian Sea lies to the west. Paithalmala is the highest point in Kannur District (1,372m). Enclosed within the southern part of the district is the Mahé district of the Union Territory of Puducherry. The district was established in 1957.

Kannur Municipal Corporation is the sixth-largest urban local body in the state and Kannur Cantonment is the only Cantonment Board in Kerala. Indian Naval Academy at Ezhimala is the Asia's largest, and the world's third-largest, naval academy. Muzhappilangad beach is the longest Drive-In Beach in Asia and is featured among the top 6 best beaches for driving in the world in BBC article for Autos. Kannur district is home to some forts which include St. Angelo Fort, and Tellicherry Fort. Thalassery town in the district is known for the Thalassery pepper.

Kannur is the sixth-most urbanised district in Kerala, with more than 50% of its residents living in urban areas. Kannur has an urban population of 1,640,986, which is the second largest in Kerala after Ernakulam district. It was part of the Malabar District under the Madras province during the British Raj.

== Formation ==
Following the formation of the state of Kerala in 1956, the erstwhile Malabar District was divided into three: Kannur District, Kozhikode district, and Palakkad district. On 1 November 1980, the North Wayanad Taluk of Kannur district was separated to form Wayanad district. Again in 1984, Kasaragod and Hosdurg Taluks were separated to form Kasargod district.

== History ==
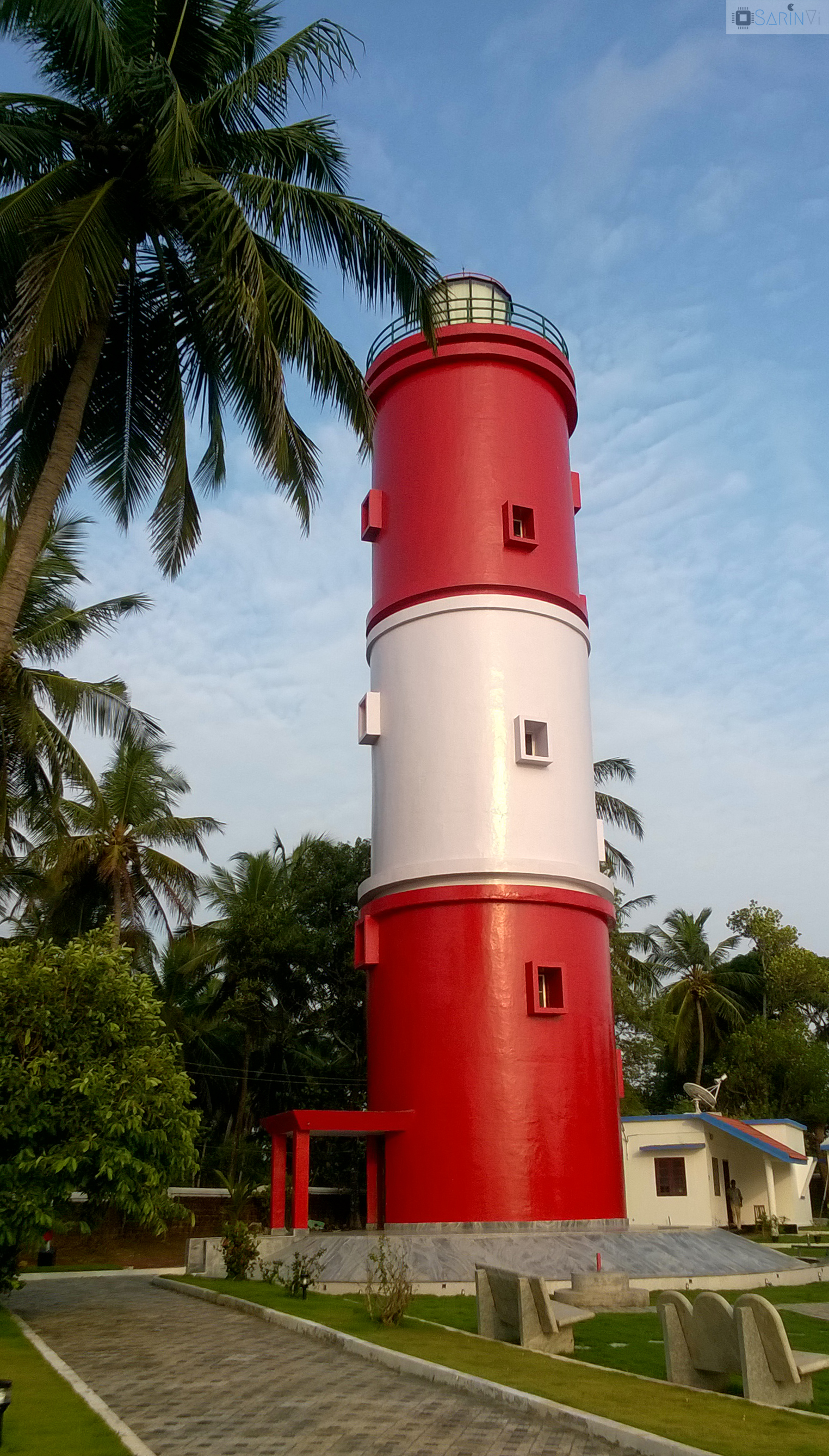
Kannur Lighthouse

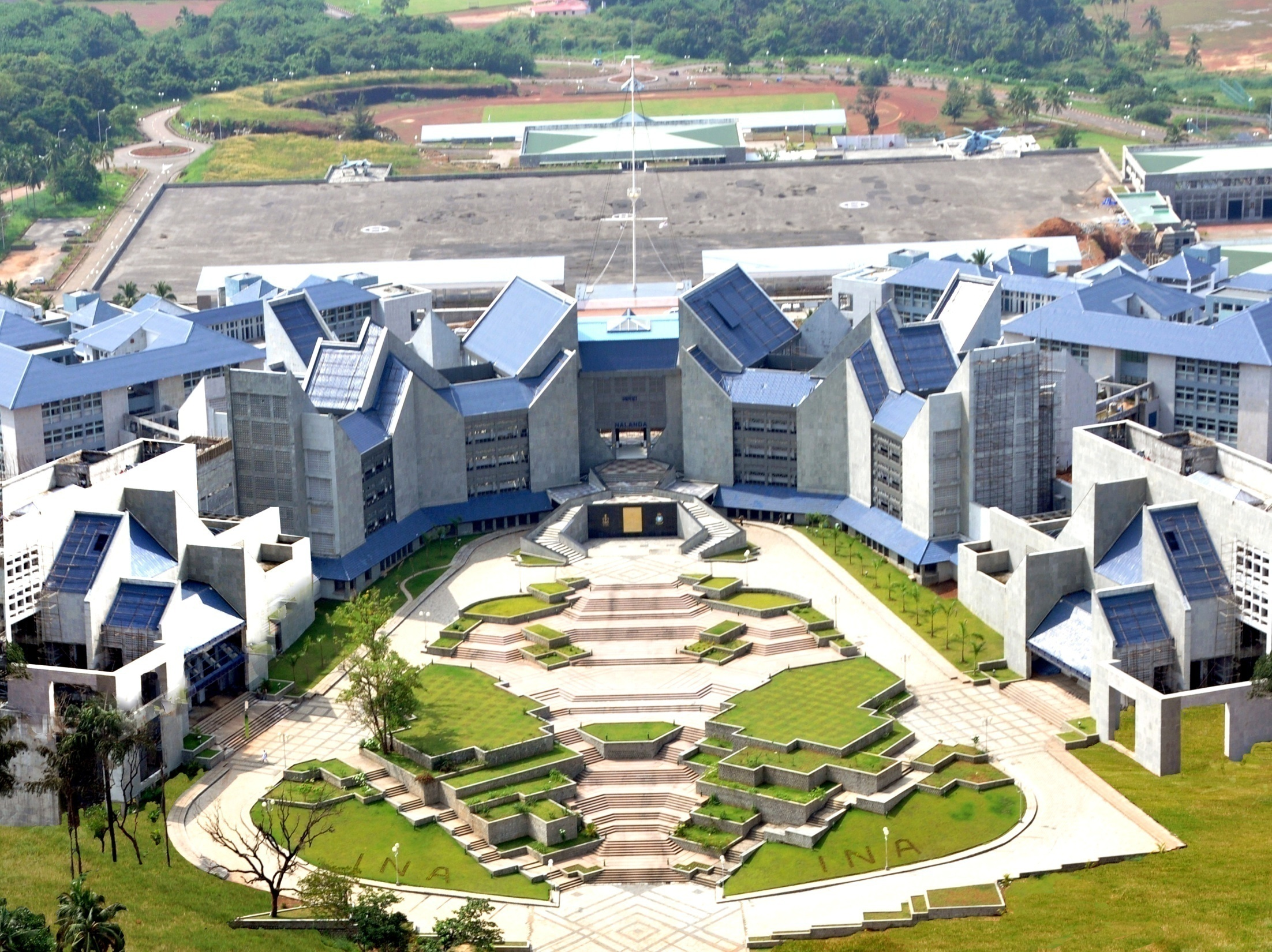
Indian Naval Academy at Ezhimala

=== Pre-history and Ancient Era ===
The earliest evidence of human habitation in the district are rock-cut caves and megalithic burial sites of the Neolithic age. The Taliparamba-Kannur-Thalassery area abounds in rock-cut caves, dolmens, burial stone circles and menhirs, all of megalith. Kannur was the seat of powerful kingdom based at Ezhimala in the Sangam period (1st–5th century CE). The ancient port of Naura, which is mentioned in the Periplus of the Erythraean Sea as a port somewhere north of Muziris is identified with Kannur.

The kingdom of Ezhimala had jurisdiction over two Nadus - The coastal Poozhinadu and the hilly eastern Karkanadu. According to the works of Sangam literature, Poozhinadu consisted much of the coastal belt between Mangalore and Kozhikode. Karkanadu consisted of Wayanad-Gudalur hilly region with parts of Kodagu (Coorg). It is said that Nannan, the most renowned ruler of Ezhimala dynasty, took refuge at Wayanad hills in the 5th century CE when he was lost to Cheras, just before his execution in a battle, according to the Sangam works.

=== Early Middle Ages ===
Ezhimala kingdom was succeeded by Mushika dynasty in the early medieval period, most possibly due to the migration of Tuluva Brahmins from Tulu Nadu. The Mushika-vamsha Mahakavya, written by Athula in the 11th century, throws light on the recorded past of the Mushika Royal Family up until that point. The Indian anthropologist Ayinapalli Aiyappan states that a powerful and warlike clan of the Bunt community of Tulu Nadu was called Kola Bari and the Kolathiri Raja of Kolathunadu was a descendant of this clan. The Kolathunadu (Kannur) Kingdom at the peak of its power, reportedly extended from Netravati River (Mangalore) in the north to Korapuzha (Kozhikode) in the south with Arabian Sea on the west and Kodagu hills on the eastern boundary, also including the isolated islands of Lakshadweep in the Arabian Sea.

An Old Malayalam inscription (Ramanthali inscriptions), dated to 1075 CE, mentioning king Kunda Alupa, the ruler of Alupa dynasty of Mangalore, can be found at Ezhimala (the former headquarters of Mushika dynasty) near Kannur. The Arabic inscription on a copper slab within the Madayi Mosque in Kannur records its foundation year as 1124 CE. In his book on travels (Il Milione), Marco Polo recounts his visit to the area in the mid 1290s. Other visitors included Faxian, the Buddhist pilgrim and Ibn Batuta, writer and historian of Tangiers.

=== Late Middle Ages ===
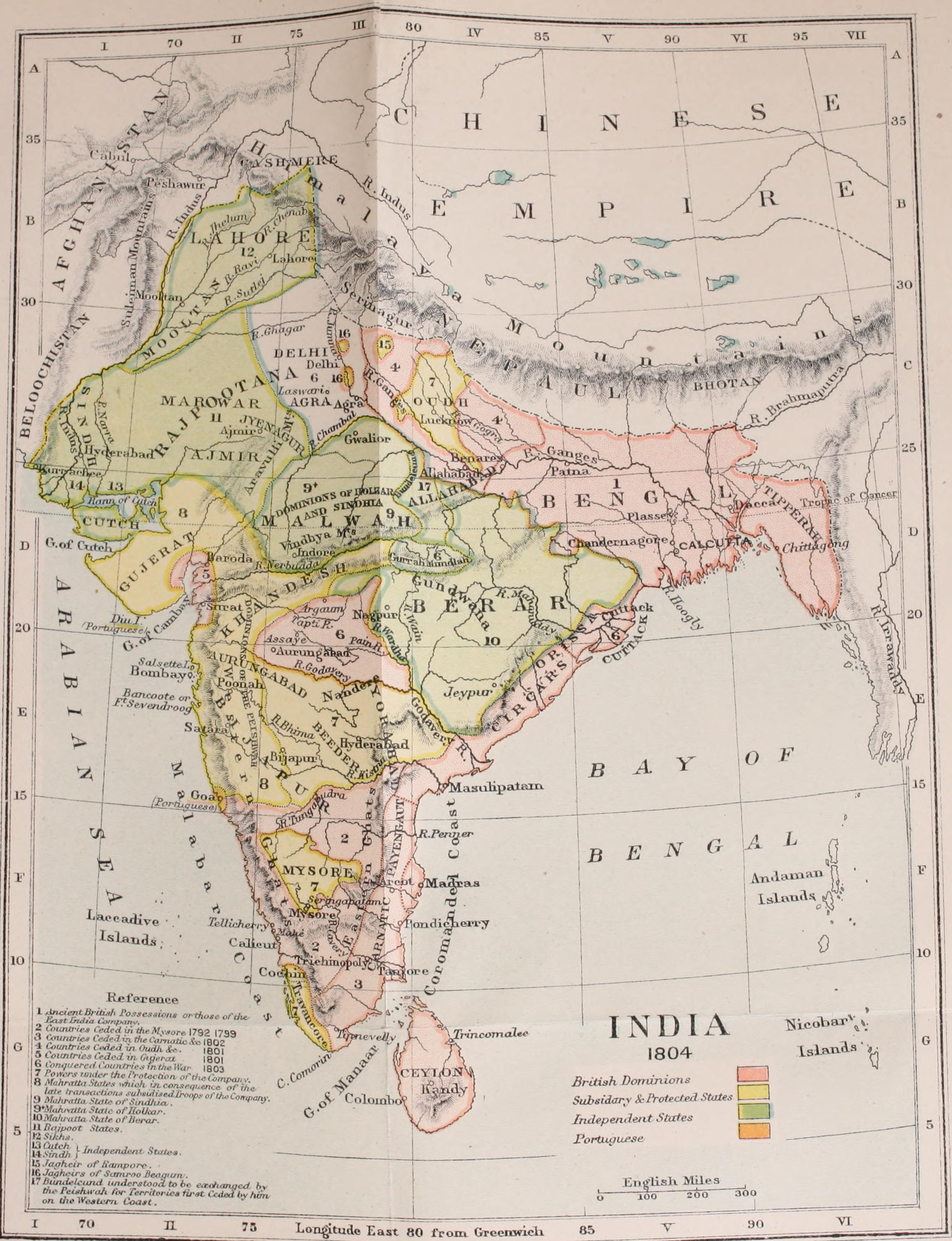
An old map of India in 1804. Note that only Thalassery, Kozhikode, and Kochi, are marked as cities within the present-day state of Kerala

Until the 16th century CE, the Kasargod town was known by the name Kanhirakode (may be by the meaning, 'The land of Kanhira Trees') in Malayalam. The Kumbla dynasty, who swayed over the land of southern Tulu Nadu wedged between Chandragiri River and Netravati River (including present-day Taluks of Manjeshwar and Kasaragod) from Maipady Palace at Kumbla, had also been vassals to the Kolathunadu, before the Carnatic conquests of Vijayanagara Empire. The Kumbla dynasty had a mixed lineage of Malayali Nairs and Tuluva Brahmins. They also claimed their origin from Cheraman Perumals of Kerala. Francis Buchanan-Hamilton states that the customs of Kumbla dynasty were similar to those of the contemporary Malayali kings, though Kumbla was considered as the southernmost region of Tulu Nadu. Just like other contemporary kings of Kerala in the medieval period, The powerful Kolathu Raja also came under the influence of Zamorin later. The Kolathunadu in the late medieval period emerged into independent 10 principalities i.e., Kadathanadu (Vadakara), Randathara or Poyanad (Dharmadom), Kottayam (Thalassery), Nileshwaram, Iruvazhinadu (Panoor, Kurumbranad etc., under separate royal chieftains due to the outcome of internal dissensions. The Nileshwaram dynasty on the northernmost part of Kolathiri dominion, were relatives to both Kolathunadu as well as the Zamorin of Calicut, in the early medieval period.

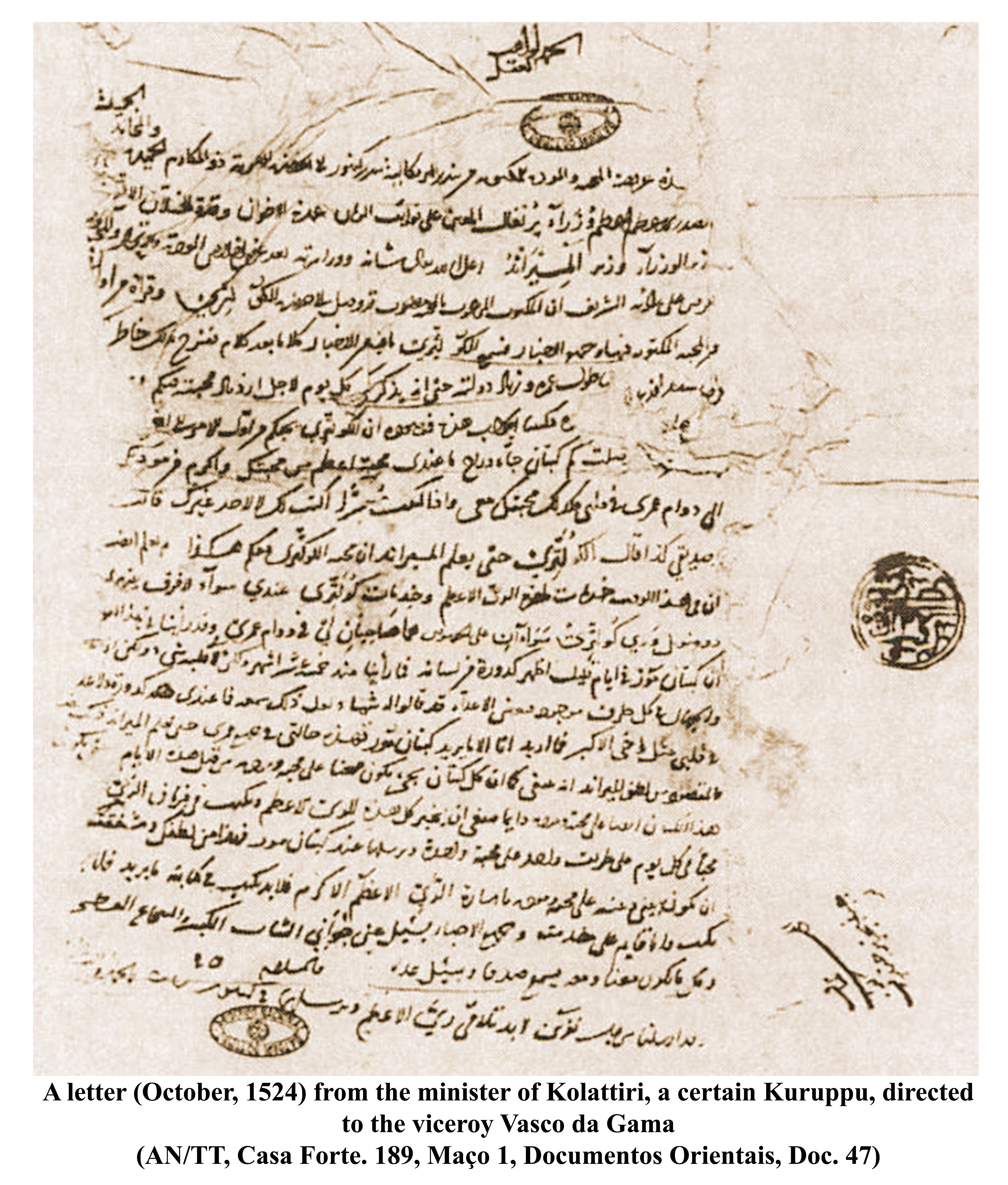
Kolattiri Raja's minister Kuruppu's Arabic letter to Vasco da Gama (1524)

=== Colonial era ===
Kannur was an important trading center in the 12th century with active business connections with Persia and Arabia. The port at Kozhikode held the superior economic and political position in medieval Kerala coast, while Kannur, Kollam, and Kochi, were commercially important secondary ports, where the traders from various parts of the world would gather. Kannur served as the British military headquarters on India's west coast until 1887. In conjunction with her sister city, Tellicherry, it was the third-largest city on the western coast of British India in the 18th century after Bombay and Karachi. The Arakkal kingdom had right over the city of Kannur and Laccadive Islands in the late medieval period.

The Portuguese arrived at Kappad Kozhikode in 1498 during the Age of Discovery, thus opening a direct sea route from Europe to India. The St. Angelo Fort at Kannur was built in 1505 by Dom Francisco de Almeida, the first Portuguese Viceroy of India. The Dutch captured the fort from the Portuguese in 1663. They modernized the fort and built the bastions Hollandia, Zeelandia, and Frieslandia that are the major features of the present structure. The original Portuguese fort was pulled down later. A painting of this fort and the fishing ferry behind it can be seen in the Rijksmuseum Amsterdam. The Dutch sold the fort to the king Ali Raja of Arakkal in 1772. The British conquered it in 1790 and used it as one of their major military stations on the Malabar Coast.

During the 17th century, Kannur was the capital city of the only Muslim polity in the Far-South of India – Arakkal – who also ruled the Laccadive Islands in addition to the city of Kannur. Arakkal Kingdom and Chirakkal kingdom were two vassal kingdoms based in the city of Kannur. The island of Dharmadom near Kannur, along with Thalassery, was ceded to the East India Company as early as 1734, which were claimed by all of the Kolattu Rajas, Kottayam Rajas, Mannanar and Arakkal Bibi in the late medieval period, where the British initiated a factory and English settlement following the cession. In 1761, the British captured Mahé, and the settlement was handed over to the ruler of Kadathanadu. The British restored Mahé to the French as a part of the 1763 Treaty of Paris. In 1779, the Anglo-French war broke out, resulting in the French loss of Mahé. In 1783, the British agreed to restore to the French their settlements in India, and Mahé was handed over to the French in 1785.

During the British Raj, Kannur was part of the Madras Presidency in the Malabar District. Initially the British had to suffer local resistance against their rule under the leadership of Kerala Varma Pazhassi Raja, who had popular support in Thalassery-Wayanad region. The municipalities of Kannur and Thalassery were formed on 1 November 1866 according to the Madras Act 10 of 1865 (Amendment of the Improvements in Towns act 1850) of the British Indian Empire, along with the municipalities of Kozhikode, Palakkad, and Fort Kochi, making them the first modern municipalities in the modern state of Kerala.

== Geography ==
The Kannur district covers an area of 2966 km², accounting for 7.63% of Kerala's total area, making it the fifth-largest district in Kerala.

=== Physiography ===
1) Cannanore coast

This region forms a narrow coastal strip on the western side of the district, extending longitudinally across all taluks. The central tract is generally flat, except for the rocky cliff near Ezhimala (260 m) and isolated pockets along the northern coast and around Thalassery.

2) Taliparamba - Kuthuparamba plains

It is a rolling plain that slopes gently westward, with elevations ranging from 63 m at Pattuvam in Taliparamba taluk to 159 m at Kolavelloor in Thalassery taluk. The landscape is characterized by lateritic mesas and low lateritic hills, with isolated hills such as Ezhimala, along with floodplains and river terraces formed by the Anjarakandi, Thalassery and Mahe rivers.

3) Peringome - Mattanur Undulating Upland

This region has an undulating terrain with isolated hills and plantation surfaces of varying elevations, generally sloping westward. The elevation ranges from around 100 m in the west to a maximum of 933 m at Payyavoor village in Taliparamba taluk.

4) Kannoth forested hills

This region borders the Wayanad Plateau with steep slopes and a sudden drop in gradient. Its elevation ranges from 100 m along its western border to a maximum of 1,047 m at Cheruvanchery in Thalassery taluk, sloping generally westward. It forms the catchment area of the Valapattanam, Kuttikol, Bavali and Anjarakandi Rivers, which originate from the ridges bordering the Wayanad Plateau and flow down to the midlands forming deep gorges. Landslides are common in the region during the monsoon season.

=== Mountains ===
The mountains form a continuation of the midland, gradually rising to the main ridge of the Western Ghats. The highest peak in the district is Paithalmala, in Taliparamba taluk, at 1,371.6 m. Ezhimala, an isolated hill rising to 260.6 m and projecting into the Laccadive Sea, has served as an important navigational landmark since ancient times. There are forested hills on the eastern side of Iritty taluk.

=== Rivers ===
SL no.	Name of River	Origin	Length in km	
SL no.	Name of River	Origin	Total	Navigable
1	Valapattanam River	Brahmagiri Hills (Karnataka)	110	45.06
2	Kuppam River	Padinalkad forest (Karnataka)	82	24
3	Perumba River	Pekkunnu hills	51	21
4	Anjarakandi River	Kannavam forest hills	48	16
5	Mahe River	Wayanad hills	54	20
6	Ramapuram River	Pariyaram village	19	8
7	Thalassery River	Kannavam forest hills	28	5

Kannur district has a well-developed river system, with most rivers being perennial, supporting irrigation and minor flood-control works. Seven rivers flow through Kannur district, of which the Valapattanam River is the longest and the Ramapuram River is the shortest.

== Government and politics ==
Local bodies in Kannur district

Municipalities

Anthoor
Iritty
Kuthuparamba
Mattanur
Panoor
Payyanur
Sreekandapuram
Taliparamba
Thalassery

Kannur district consists of two revenue subdivisions - Taliparamba and Thalassery. For sake of rural administration, 71 Gram Panchayats are combined in 11 Blocks, which together form the Kannur District Panchayat. For the sake of urban administration, Kannur Municipal Corporation and 9 municipal towns are there.

For the representation of Kannur in Kerala Legislative Assembly, there are 11 assembly constituencies. These are included in three parliamentary constituencies, i.e., Kasaragod, Kannur, and Vatakara. The district is further divided into 132 villages which together form 5 subdistricts.

=== Political divisions ===
==== Parliament ====
Parliamentary Constituency	Political Party	Political Coalition	Elected Representative
Kasargod	INC	UDF	Rajmohan Unnithan
Kannur	INC	UDF	K. Sudhakaran
Vatakara	INC	UDF	Shafi Parambil

== Demographics ==
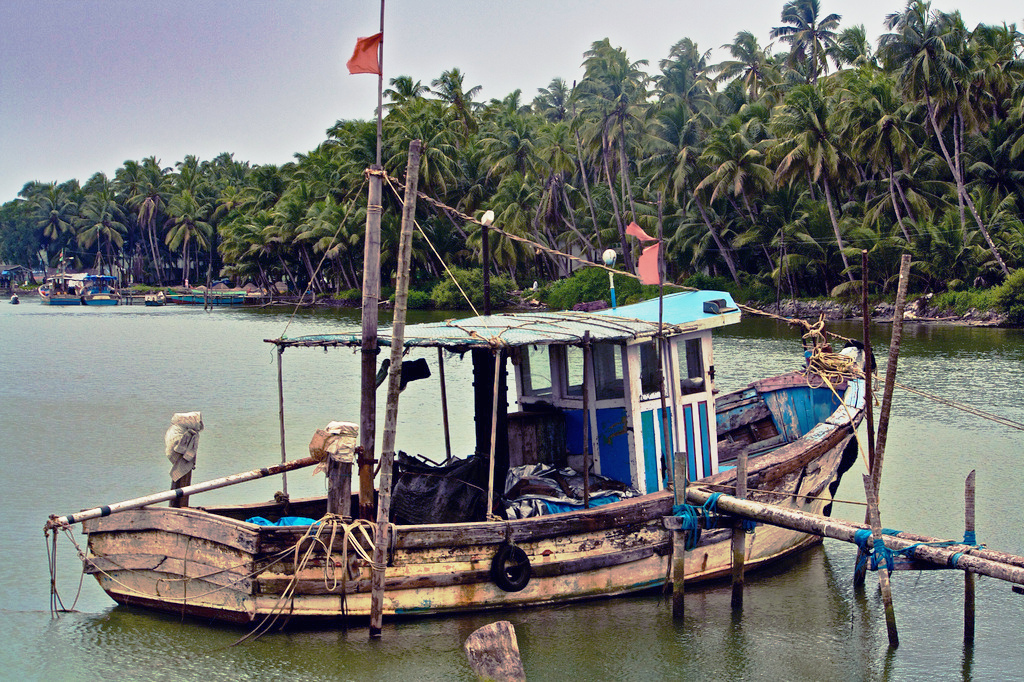
Matool ferry

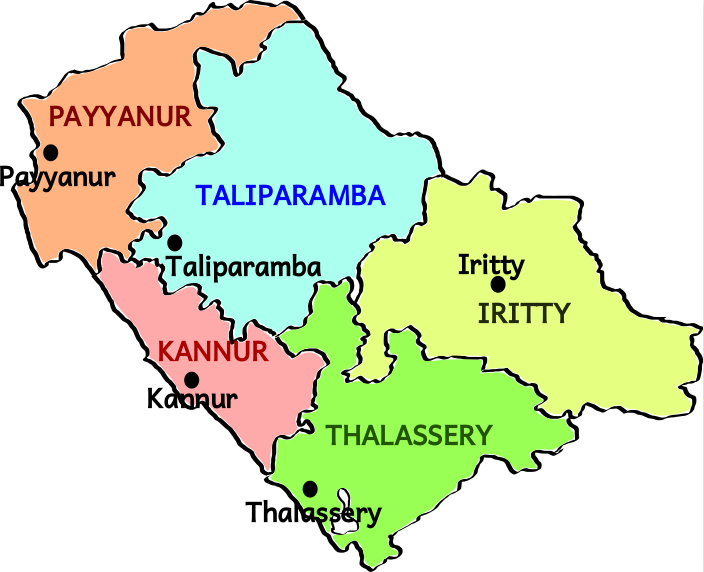
Taluks of Kannur

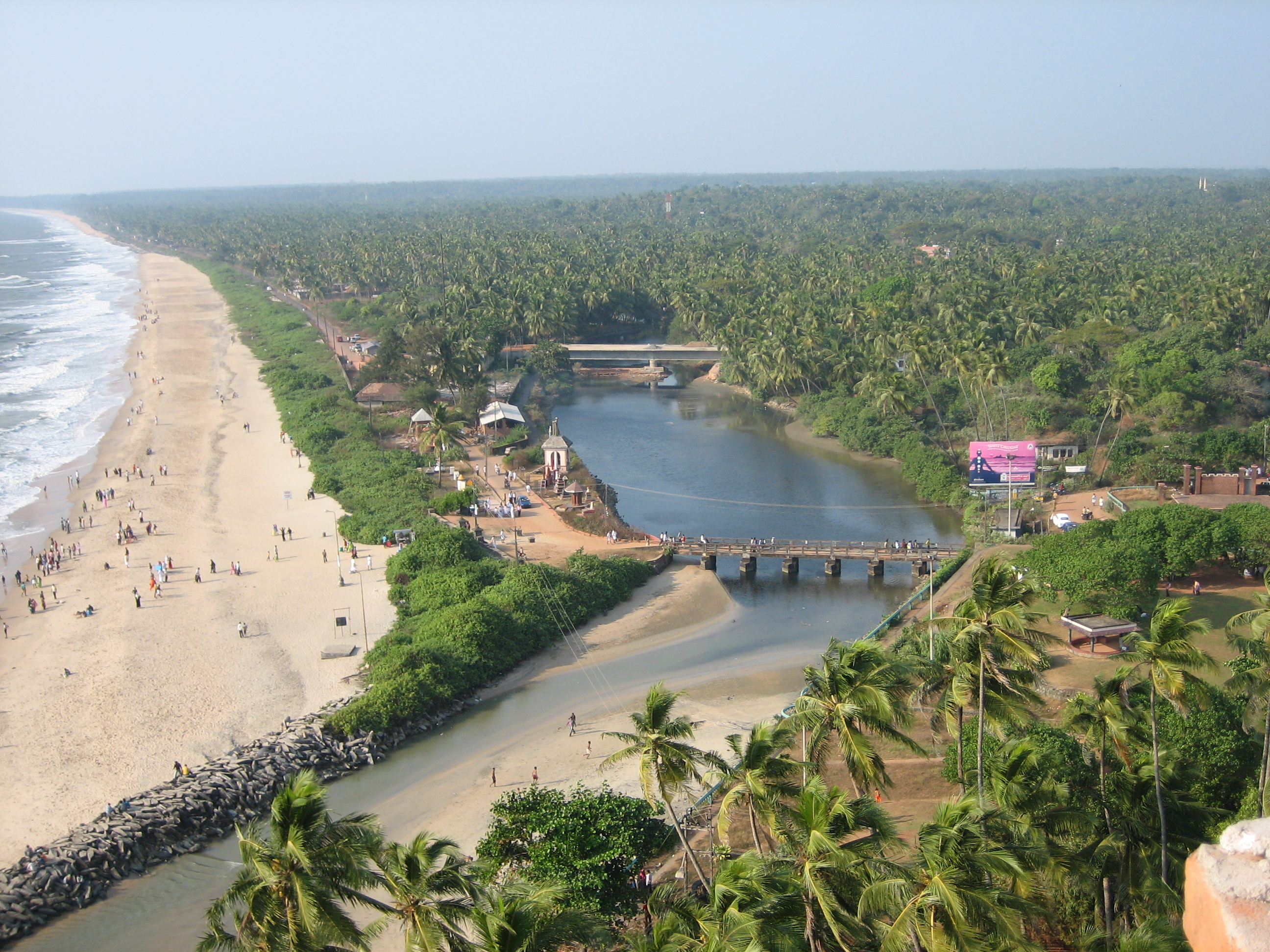
Payyambalam beach

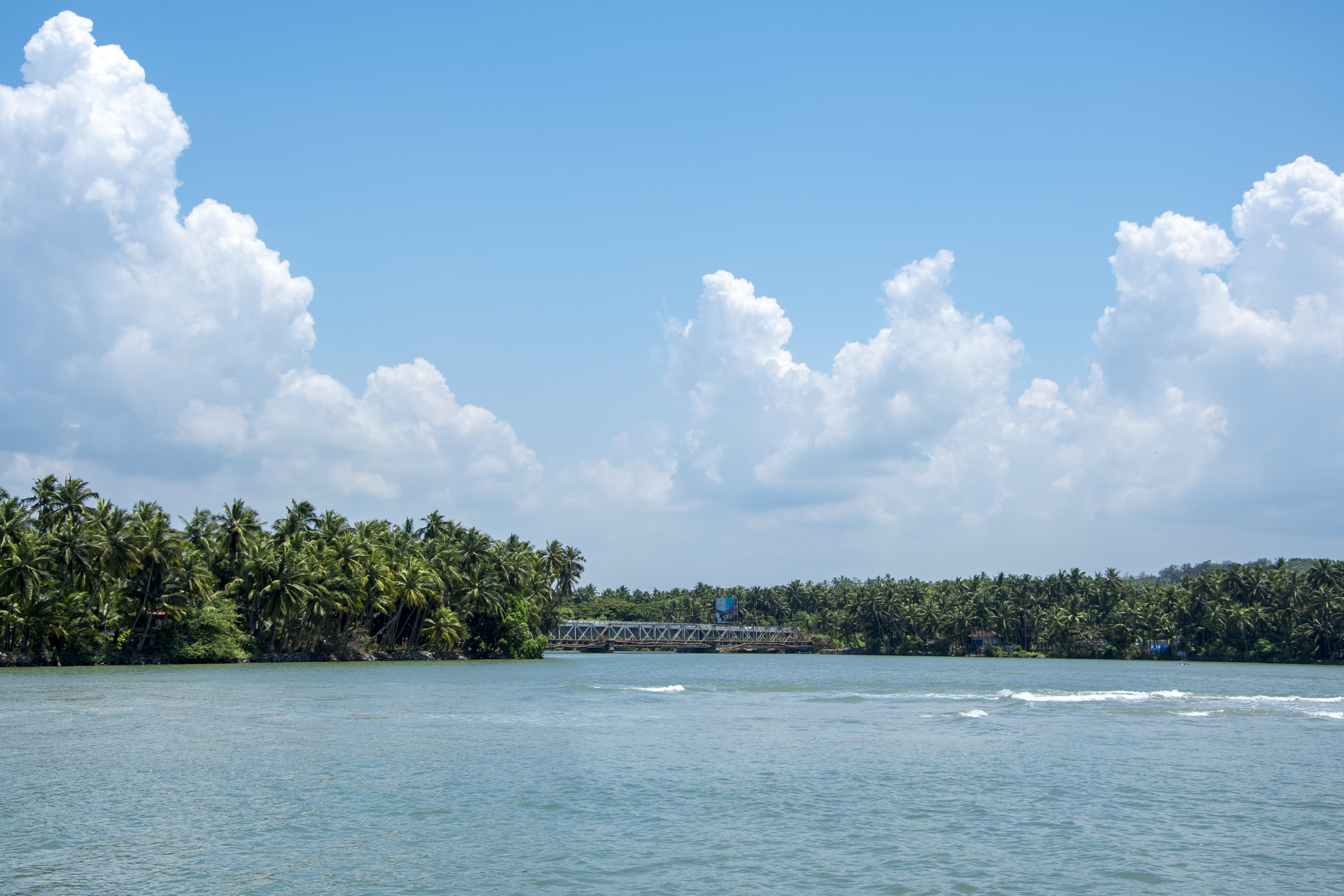
Estuary of Anjarakandi River

Historical population
Year	Pop.	±% p.a.
1901	529,623	—
1911	565,261	+0.65%
1921	578,680	+0.23%
1931	662,715	+1.37%
1941	743,322	+1.15%
1951	904,470	+1.98%
1961	1,177,948	+2.68%
1971	1,552,809	+2.80%
1981	1,930,726	+2.20%
1991	2,251,727	+1.55%
2001	2,408,956	+0.68%
2011	2,523,003	+0.46%
2018	2,615,266	+0.51%

According to the 2018 Statistics Report, Kannur district has a population of 2,615,266, The district has a population density of 882 inhabitants per square kilometre (2,280/sq mi). Its population growth rate over the decade 2001–2011 was 4.84%. The 2011 Census of India gives the district a ranking of 170th in India (out of a total of 640). Kannur has a sex ratio of 1133 females for every 1000 males, the highest among any district in India, and a literacy rate of 95.10%. Scheduled Castes and Scheduled Tribes make up 3.30% and 1.64% of the population respectively. Malayalam is the predominant language, spoken by 98.88% of the population. Small minorities speak Tamil, Hindi and Kannada, mainly in urban areas.

The District has a population of 2,412,365 (2001 census). This was the most urbanised district in Kerala in 2001, but was pushed to 4th place after Ernakulam, Thrissur and Kozhikode in 2011. About 50.35% of the population reside in the urban agglomerations. The total urban population of Kannur district is 1,640,986. This is the second largest urban population in Kerala after Ernakulam and is more than the population of a metro city.

The high urban population is due to the 45 towns in the district which was the highest in Kerala as per 2001 census. 2011 census has Thrissur with 135 towns with Kannur having 67. Kannur district has one Municipal Corporation Kannur, and other major municipalities including Thalassery, Payyanur, Taliparamba, Kuthuparamba and Mattannur. In addition to this there are 60 including Ancharakandy, Azhikode North, Azhikode South, Chala, Chelora, Cherukunnu, Cheruthazham, Chirakkal, Chockli, Dharmadom, Elayavoor, Eranholi, Iriveri, Kadachira, Kadirur, Kalliasseri, Kanhirode, Kannadiparamba, Kannapuram, Kottayam-Malabar, Mayyil, Mavilayi, Munderi, Muzhappilangad, Narath, New Mahe, Paduvilayi, Pallikkunnu, Panniyannur, Panoor, Pappinisseri, Pathiriyad, Pattiom, Iritty, Peralasseri, Peringathur, Pinarayi, Puzhathi, Thottada, Valapattanam, Varam.

=== Religion ===
Religions in Kannur district (2011)
Religion	Percent
Hinduism	59.83%
Islam	29.43%
Christianity	10.41%
Other or not stated	0.33%

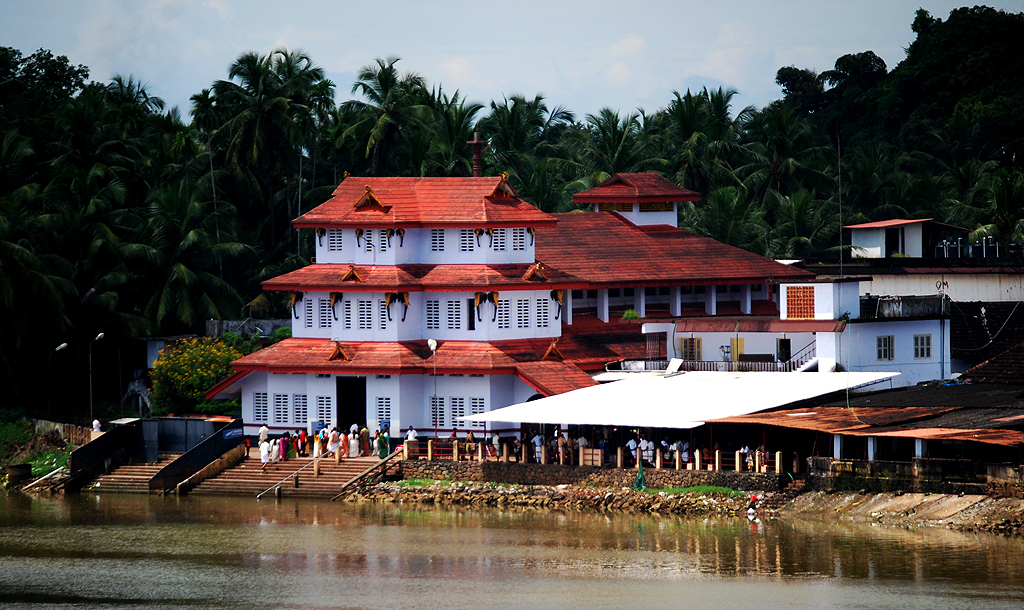
Parassinikkadavu Muthappan Temple

A Masjid at Payyanur

Hinduism is the majority religion of Kannur district with 59.83% of the population. Muslims and Christians form a significant minority with 29.43% and 10.41% of the population respectively.

Most of the Christians in Kannur district are descendants of Christians who migrated to Malabar in the 20th century.

== Education ==
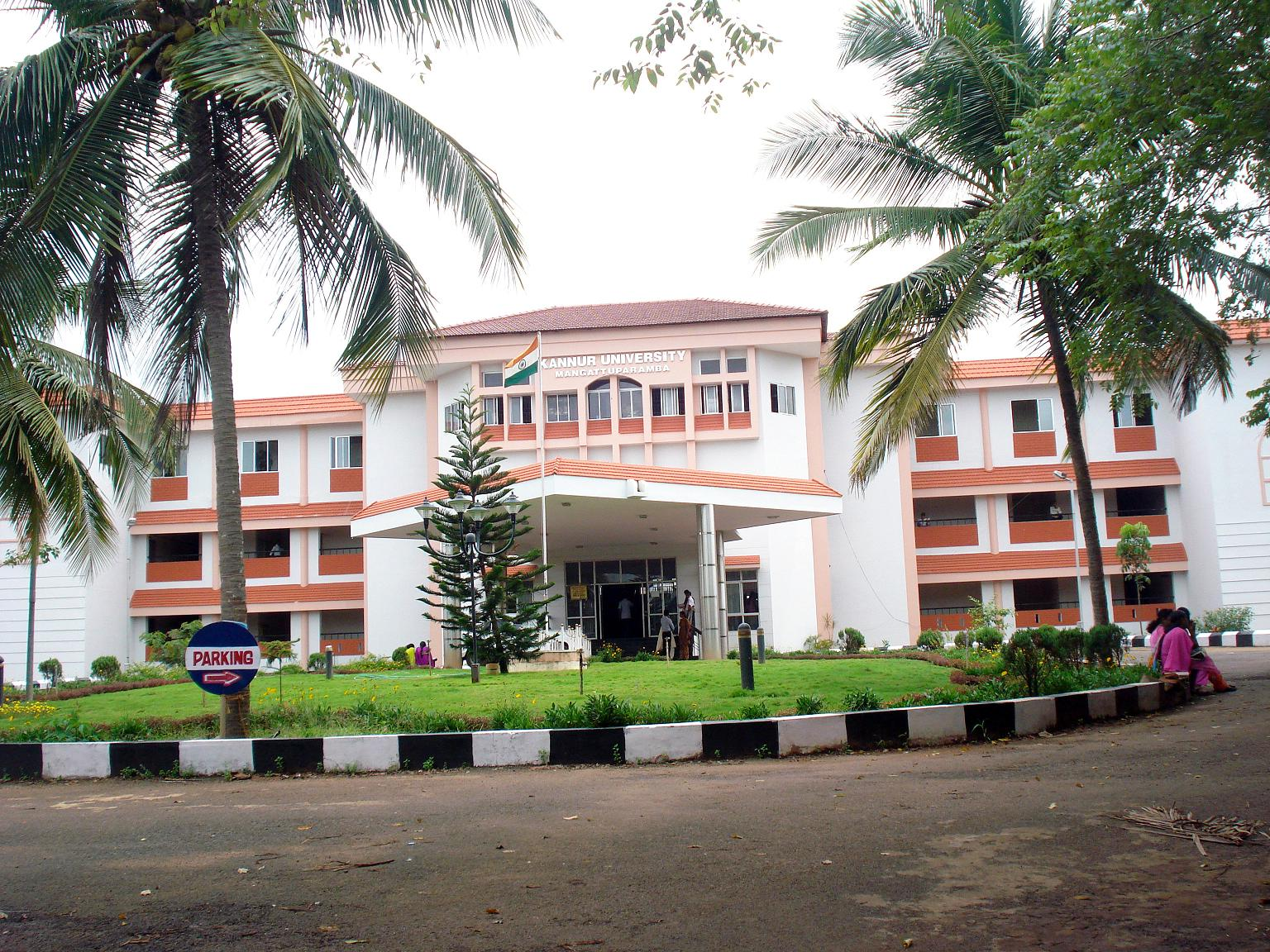
The Kannur University

- Government College of Engineering, Kannur
- Government Brennen College, Thalassery
- S. N. College, Kannur

== Culture ==
Kerala Folklore Academy, an autonomous centre for cultural affairs constituted by the Government of Kerala situated in Chirakkal, Kannur to promote and project the traditional art forms of Kerala. The academy awards prizes and to notable artistes and experts in the field of folklore. The fellowships comprise ₹15000 each and citation. The folklore awards and book award carries ₹7500 and citation. The Gurupooja and Yuvaprathibha award winners will get ₹5000 each and citation.

=== Theyyam ===
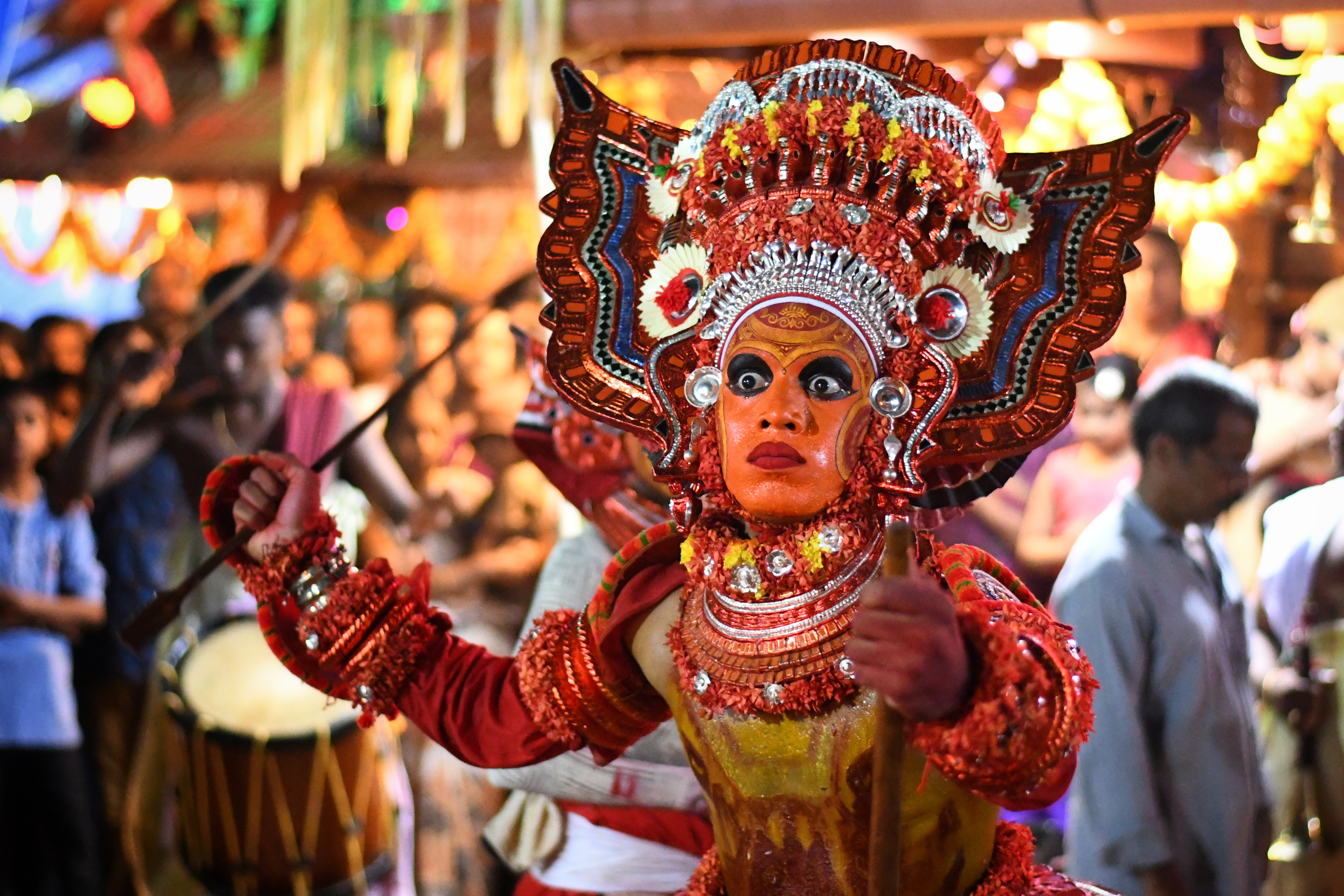
Theyyam of Kerala

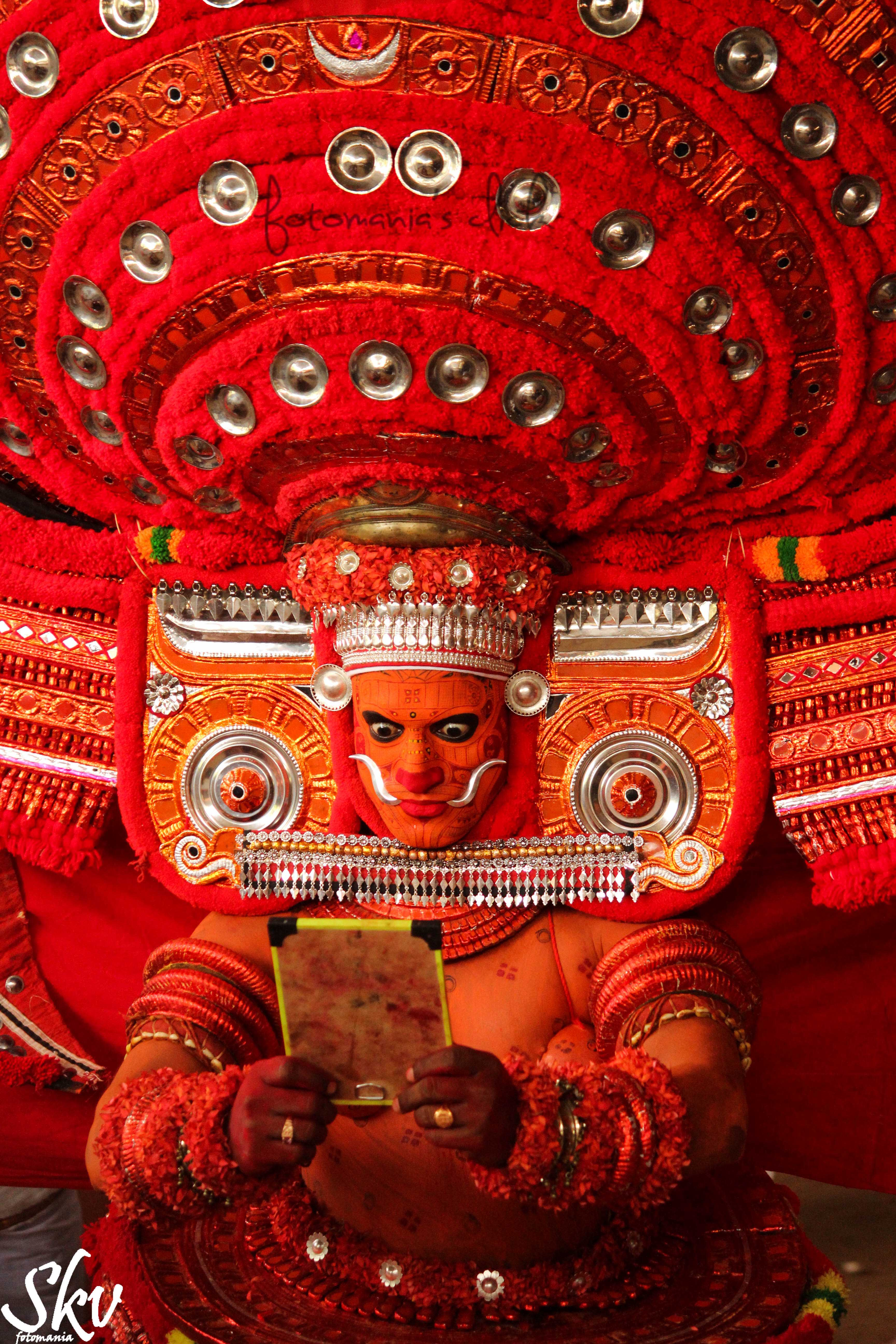
Puliyoor Kali Theyyam at Mathamangalam

Theyyam is a popular ritual form of dance worship in Kannur-Kasaragod region of Kerala. Theyyam consisted of several thousand-year-old traditions, rituals, and customs. The performers of Theyyam belong to the lower caste community in ancient caste structure formed by Namboothiri Brahmins in Kerala, and have an important position in Theyyam. It is performed mainly by males, except the Devakoothu theyyam. The Devakoothu is the only Theyyam ritual performed by women. It is performed only on the Thekkumbad Kulom temple.

There are 456 types of Theyyam, including Vettakkorumakan, Vishnumoorthy Theyyam, Muchilot Bhagavathi and Sree Muthappan.

A Theyyam museum is planned to be built at Chanthappura in Kadannappalli panchayat of Kannur district in 2019.

=== Kalaripayattu ===
Ponnyam, a village in Kannur district is known as the birthplace of the northern style of Kalaripayattu (Vadakkan Kalari). Several traditional training centres (kalaris) are located in the district.

Vadakkan Pattukal (Northern Ballads) are folk songs about local heroes. Poorakkali and Marathukali are traditional art forms performed during temple festivals in the region.

=== Kannur Cuisine ===
The Kannur cuisine depicts its culture and heritage. It is famous for Thalassery biriyani. The city is also known for Haluva. Another speciality is banana chips, which are made crisp and wafer-thin. Other popular dishes include seafood preparations (prawns, mussels, mackerel) . Vegetarian fare includes the sadya.

Kannur cuisine is a blend of traditional Kerala, Persian, Yemenese and Arab food culture. This confluence of culinary cultures is best seen in the preparation of most dishes. Kallummakkaya (mussels) curry, irachi puttu (irachi meaning meat), parottas (soft flatbread), Pathiri (a type of rice pancake) and ghee rice are some of the other specialties. The characteristic use of spices is the hallmark of the cuisine—black pepper, cardamom and clove are used profusely.

The Kerala version of biryani, popularly known as kuzhi mandi in Malayalam is another popular item, which has an influence from Yemen. Various varieties of biriyanis like Thalassery biriyani, and Kannur biriyani, are prepared here.

The snacks include unnakkaya (deep-fried, boiled ripe banana paste covering a mixture of cashew, raisins and sugar), pazham nirachathu (ripe banana filled with coconut grating, molasses or sugar), muttamala made of eggs, chatti pathiri, a dessert made of flour, like a baked, layered chapati with rich filling, arikkadukka, and more.

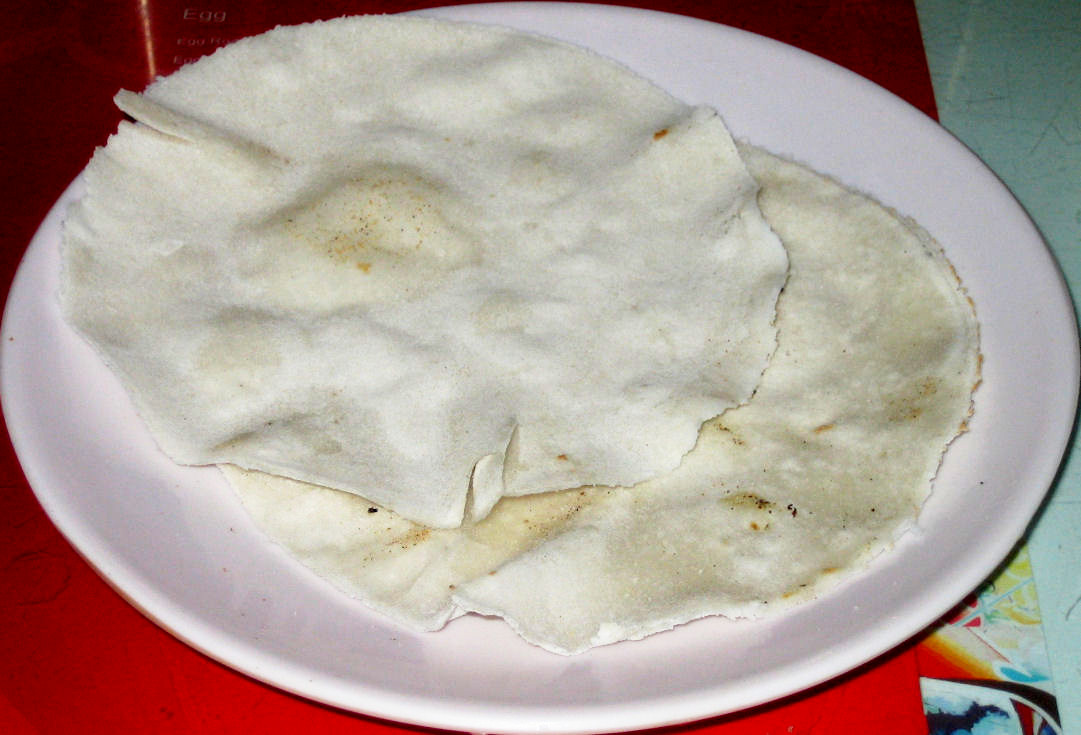
Pathiri, a pancake made of rice flour, is one of the common breakfast dishes in Kannur

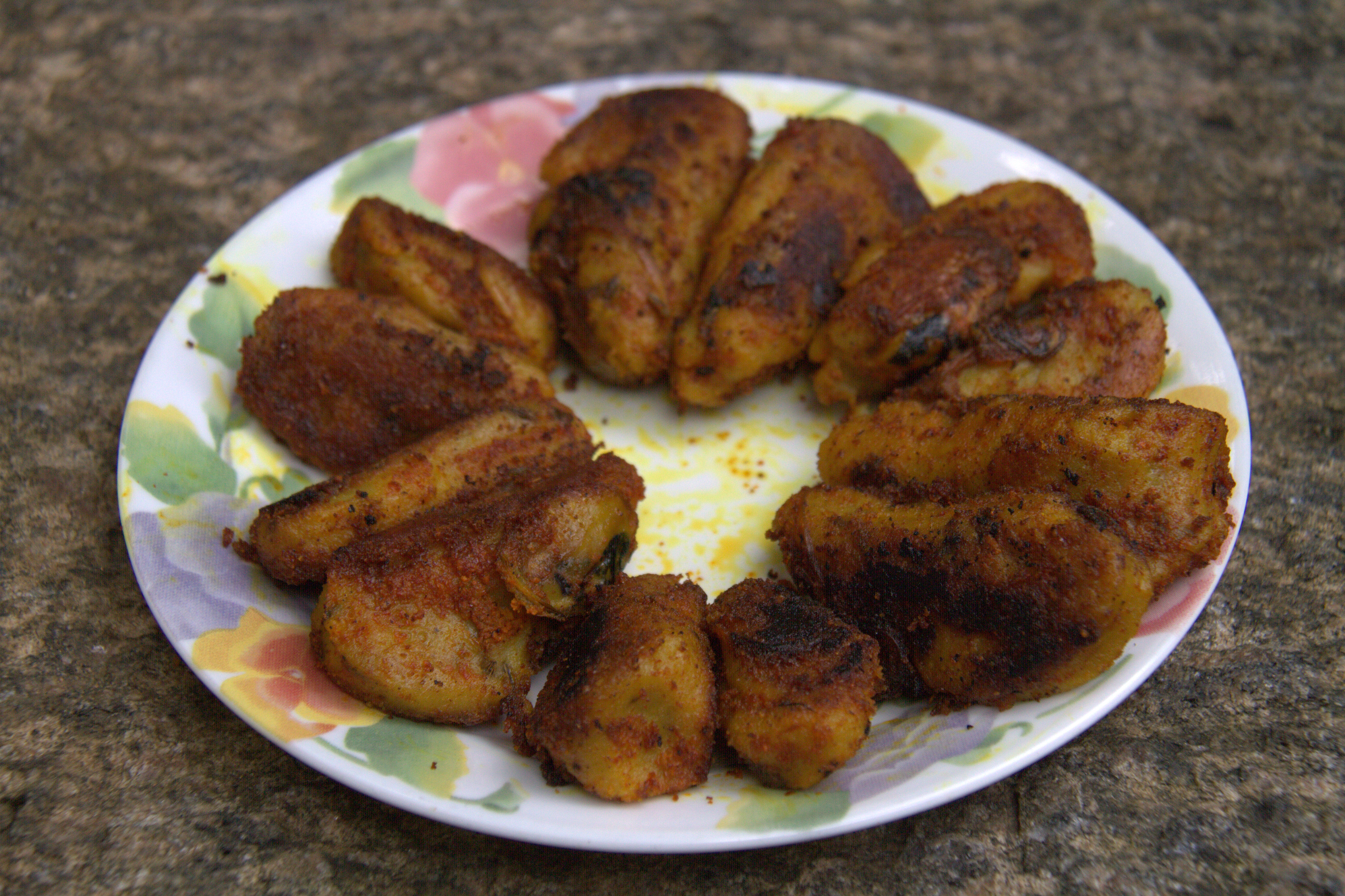
Kallummakkaya nirachathu or arikkadukka (mussels stuffed with rice)

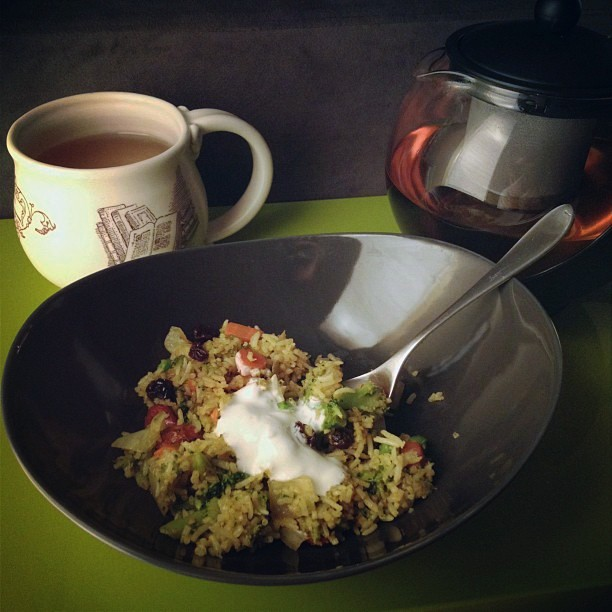
Thalassery biryani with raita

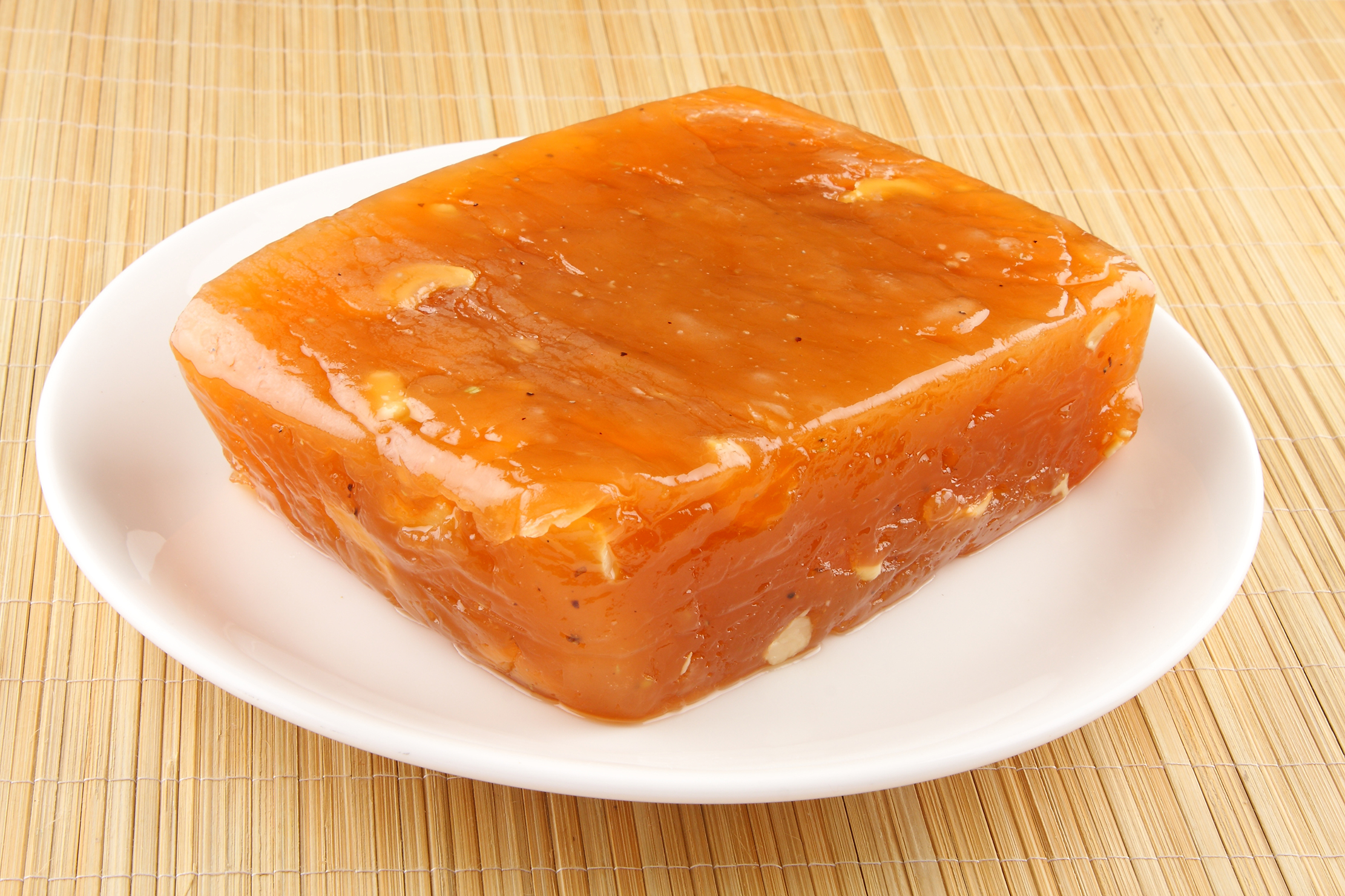
Halwas are popular in Kannur and Thalassery

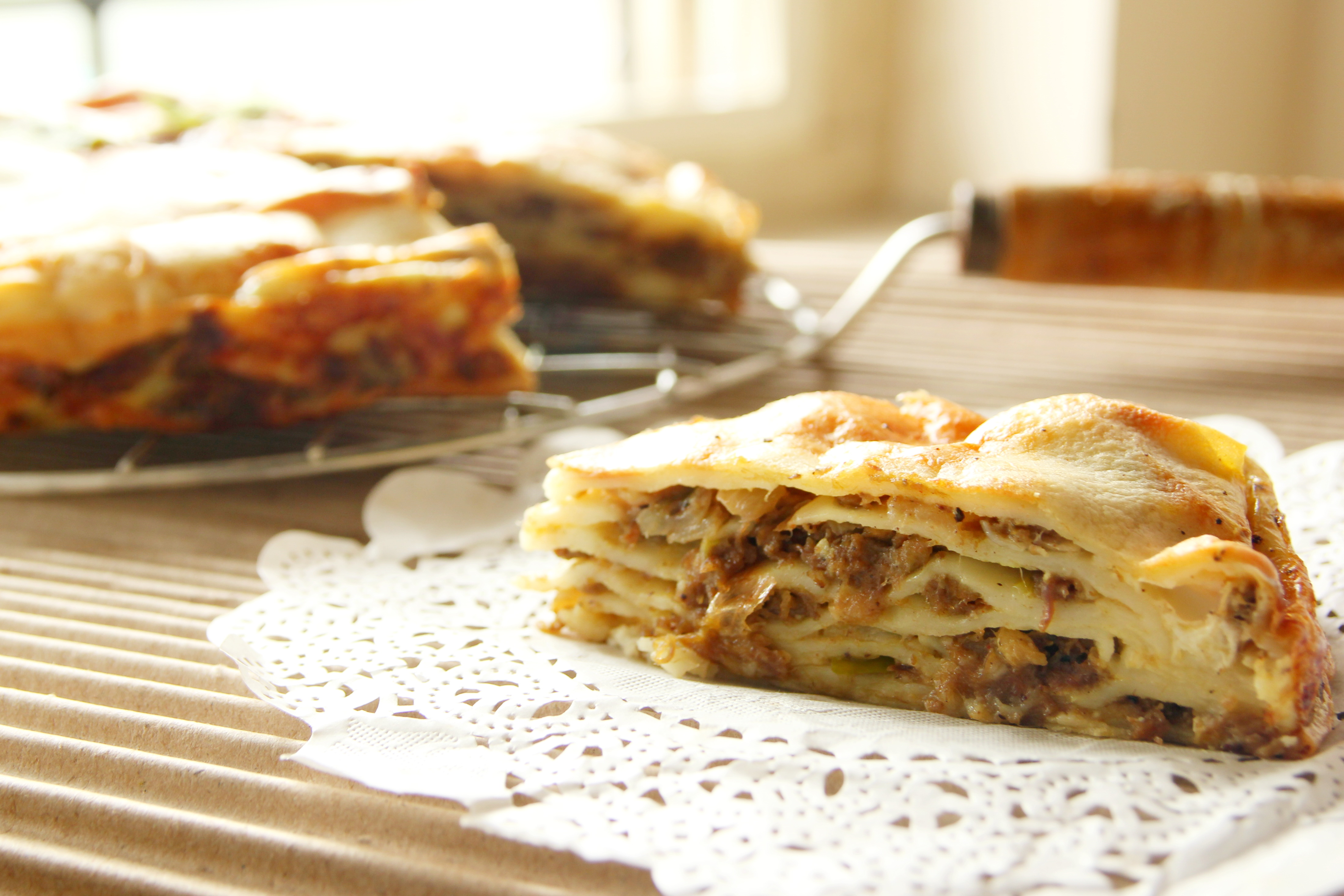
Chatti pathiri is usually served in Malabar Muslim weddings and reception parties.

== Tourism ==
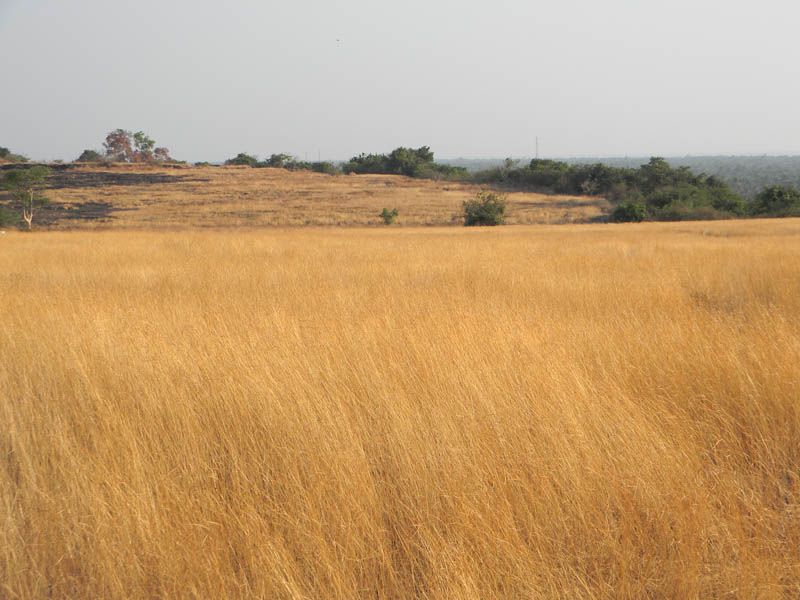
Madayi rock during February

== Geographical Indication (GI) tags ==
=== Payyanur Pavithra Ring ===
The Payyanur Pavithra Mothiram, a GI-tagged sacred ring, holds profound spiritual and cultural significance in North Malabar. Crafted by a specific family in Payyanur, this ring is traditionally worn during Pithru Bali rituals. Originally made from dharba grass, it is now often crafted from gold, while retaining its sacred importance.

=== Cannanore Home Furnishings ===
Cannanore Home Furnishings is a GI-tagged product line that emphasizes wide range of fabrics and lifestyle products, including curtains, linens, upholstery fabrics, and decorative accessories. Kannur fabrics are crafted on fly shuttle looms by generations of skilled artisans.

=== Kuttiattoor Mango ===
Kuttiattoor mango is popular and traditional cultivar of Kuttiattoor and neighbouring panchayats of Kannur district. Kuttiattoor mango received Geographical Indication (GI) tag from the GI registry at Chennai. The distinctiveness of Kuttiattoor mango is aided by the combination of specific environmental conditions of the area of its cultivation and varietal characters. Even though it is popularly known as Kuttiattoor mango, it is also known as ‘Nambiar mānga’, ‘Kannapuram mānga’, ‘Kunjimangalam mānga’ and ‘Vadakkumbhagam mānga’ in small pockets of Kannur district.

== Notable people ==
- E. Ahamed – former Minister of State for Railways
- Salim Ahamed – film director, screenwriter, film producer
- Ayathan Janaki Ammal – first female doctor of Kerala
- Janaki Ammal – botanist
- Sukumar Azhikode – writer
- C. V. Balakrishnan – writer
- Ajit Balakrishnan – founder and current CEO of Rediff.com
- N. E. Balaram – one of the founding leaders of the communist movement in Kerala
- John Brittas – Journalist and managing director of Kairali TV
- Deepak Dev – music composer
- M. V. Devan – painter, sculptor, writer, art critic and orator
- Jimmy George – volleyball player
- A. K. Gopalan – politician, former leader of the Communist Party of India (Marxist)
- Ayathan Gopalan – doctor, social reformer, philanthropist
- Gita Gopinath – chief economist of the International Monetary Fund
- T. Govindan – former Member of Parliament
- Ifthi – music composer
- E. P. Jayarajan – politician and current Industries and Sports Minister of Kerala State
- K. Karunakaran – former Chief Minister of Kerala and Indian National Congress leader
- Shamna Kasim – actor
- Santhosh Keezhattoor – actor
- Shajith Koyeri – sound designer
- P. Santhosh Kumar - Member of Parliament. Former general secretary AIYF
- Vineeth Kumar – actor
- Major General C. K. Lakshmanan – first Malayali Olympian
- Sruthi Lakshmi – actor
- Tintu Luka – athlete
- V. K. Krishna Menon – academic, diplomat, and politician
- K. U. Mohanan- director of photography
- Malavika Mohanan – actor
- Geetu Mohandas – actor
- Mamta Mohandas – actor
- V. Muraleedharan – politician and the current union minister of state for external affairs and parliamentary affairs
- C. P. Krishnan Nair – businessman and founder of Leela group of hotels
- Bejoy Nambiar- director and screenwriter
- K. P. P. Nambiar – industrialist and technocrat
- M. N. Nambiar – actor
- Parvathy Nambiar – actor
- Kaithapram Damodaran Namboothiri – lyricist, music director, actor, singer, screenwriter, and performer of Carnatic music
- Unnikrishnan Namboothiri – actor
- Madhushree Narayan – playback singer
- Ramesh Narayan – music composer
- E. K. Nayanar – former three time Chief Minister of Kerala
- T. Padmanabhan – writer
- Deepak Parambol – actor
- Sayanora Philip- playback singer, music composer
- N. Prabhakaran – writer
- Azhikodan Raghavan – politician
- K. Raghavan – music composer
- M. V. Raghavan – former minister
- Shaan Rahman – music composer
- Pazhassi Raja – ruler of the Pazhassi Kingdom in present-day Kannur district
- Anaswara Rajan – actor
- Athmiya Rajan – actor
- Kannur Rajan – music composer
- T. V. Rajesh – politician
- Kadannappalli Ramachandran – Minister of Port of Kerala
- Moorkoth Ramunni – fighter pilot
- Neha Ratnakaran – actor
- Byju Raveendran – entrepreneur, founder of Byju's App
- Sreeja Ravi – voice-dubbing artist
- Sahal Abdul Samad – footballer
- Sanjayan – writer
- Mattannoor Sankarankutty – percussionist
- Sanoop Santhosh – actor
- Sanusha – actor
- A. K. Saseendran – politician andcCurrent Transport Minister of Kerala State
- Mafia Sasi – film actor, stuntman
- V. P. Sathyan – footballer
- Roshan Sebastian – playback singer
- K. K. Shailaja – politician and current Minister of Health and Social Welfare of Kerala State
- Sushin Shyam – music composer
- P. K. Sreemathy – MP
- Sreenivasan – actor
- Dhyan Sreenivasan – actor
- Vineeth Sreenivasan – actor, singer, film director
- K. Sudhakaran – Member of Parliament, Congress leader (KPCC Executive leader)
- Njattyela Sreedharan – lexicographer
- Samvrutha Sunil – actor
- Nivetha Thomas – actor
- Ashish Vidyarthi – actor
- Pinarayi Vijayan – former CPI(M) State Secretary and Chief Minister of Kerala.
- Nikhila Vimal – actor
- Vineeth – actor
- C. K. Vineeth – footballer
- Manju Warrier – actor (originally from Thrissur, lived in Kannur during her schooling)

== See also ==
- Chakkarakkal
- Cheppanool
- Kaithery
- Kanayi
- Kannur East
- Kannur International Airport
- Kannur North
- Kannur South
- Kuniyan River
- Mathiparamba
- Muzhappala
- Onakkunnu
- Padapengad
- Padiyotchal
- Perumannu
- Pilgrimage centres in Kannur district
- Velimanam
