= Kuthuparamba Assembly constituency =

Constituency of the Kerala legislative assembly in India

Kuthuparamba
- Constituency No. 14 for the Kerala Legislative Assembly
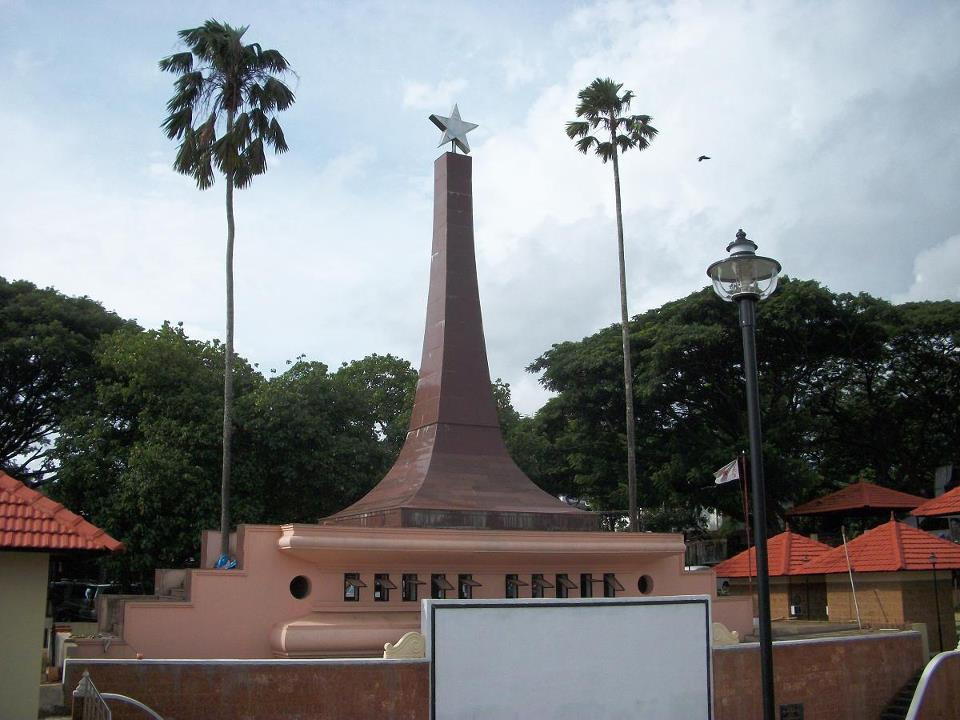
- Kuthuparamba Martyrdom Memorial

Constituency details
- Country: India
- Region: South India
- State: Kerala
- District: Kannur
- Established: 1957
- Total electors: 205,771 (2026)
- Reservation: None

Member of Legislative Assembly
- 16th Kerala Legislative Assembly
- Incumbent P. K. Praveen
- Party: RJD
- Alliance: LDF
- Elected year: 2026

Kuthuparamba State assembly constituency is one of the 140 state legislative assembly constituencies in Kerala in southern India. It is also one of the seven state legislative assembly constituencies included in Vatakara Lok Sabha constituency. As of the 2026 Assembly elections, the current MLA is P. K. Praveen of RJD.

== Local self-governed segments ==
Seven out of the nine local bodies included by the 2008 delimitation in the current Kuthuparamba Assembly constituency were parts of the erstwhile Peringalam Assembly constituency before the delimitation. In 2015, the Gram panchayats of Panoor, Peringalam, and Kariyad were merged to form Panoor Municipality.

Kuthuparamba Assembly constituency is composed of the following local self-governed segments:

Sl no.	Name	Status (Grama panchayat/Municipality)	Taluk
1	Kuthuparamba	Municipality	Thalassery
2	Panoor	Municipality	Thalassery
3	Kottayam-Malabar	Grama panchayat	Thalassery
4	Kunnothuparamba	Grama panchayat	Thalassery
5	Mokeri	Grama panchayat	Thalassery
6	Pattiom	Grama panchayat	Thalassery
7	Thrippangottur	Grama panchayat	Thalassery

== Members of Legislative Assembly ==
The following list contains all members of Kerala Legislative Assembly who have represented the constituency:

Election	Niyama Sabha	Name	Party	Tenure
1957	1st	P. R. Kurup	Praja Socialist Party	1957 – 1960
1960	2nd	P. R. Kurup	Praja Socialist Party	1960 – 1965
1967	3rd	K. K. Abu	Samyukta Socialist Party	1967 – 1970
1970	4th	Pinarayi Vijayan	Communist Party of India	1970 – 1977
1977	5th	Pinarayi Vijayan	Communist Party of India	1977 – 1980
1980	6th	M. V. Raghavan	Communist Party of India	1980 – 1982
1982	7th	P. V. Kunhikannan	Communist Party of India	1982 – 1987
1987	8th	K. P. Mamoo Master	Communist Party of India	1987 – 1991
1991	9th	Pinarayi Vijayan	Communist Party of India	1991 – 1996
1996	10th	K. K. Shailaja	Communist Party of India	1996 – 2001
2001	11th	P. Jayarajan	Communist Party of India	2001 – 2005
2005*	11th	P. Jayarajan	Communist Party of India	2005 – 2006
2006	12th	P. Jayarajan	Communist Party of India	2006 – 2011
Major boundary changes
2011	13th	K. P. Mohanan	Socialist Janata	2011 – 2016
2016	14th	K. K. Shailaja	Communist Party of India	2016 - 2021
2021	15th	K. P. Mohanan	Rashtriya Janata Dal	2021-2026
2026	16th	P. K. Praveen	Rashtriya Janata Dal	2026-

*by-election

== Election results ==
=== 2026 ===
There were 205,771 registered voters in the Kuthuparamba Assembly constituency for the 2026 Kerala Assembly elections.

2026 Kerala Legislative Assembly election: Kuthumparamba
Party	Candidate	Votes	%	±%
RJD	P. K. Praveen	70,448	42.90	▼2.46
IUML	Jayanthi Rajan	69,162	42.12	▲2.89
BJP	Adv. Shijilal	22,195	13.52	▼0.10
Independent	Jayanthi	671	0.41	
Independent	Praveen Kumar	560	0.34	
NOTA	None of the above	495	0.30	
AAP	Rafeed A.P	254	0.15	
Independent	Mohanan K. P.	169	0.10	
Independent	Shylaja	133	0.08	
Independent	Shahul Hameed	115	0.07	
Margin of victory		1,286	0.78	▼6.72
Turnout		1,64,202		
RJD hold		Swing	▼2.46	

Local Body	Booths	UDF Votes	LDF Votes	NDA/BJP Votes	Leader	Lead
Kottayam-Malabar	21	5633	8812	1495	LDF	3179
Kuthuparamba Municipality	23	6766	9642	2512	LDF	2876
Pattiam	32	6999	12325	4063	LDF	5326
Kunnothuparamba	41	13793	11198	4192	UDF	2595
Mokeri	15	3893	5744	1315	LDF	1851
Panoor Municipality	54	21111	13747	4843	UDF	7364
Thrippangottur	29	10014	7555	3450	UDF	2459
TOTAL (EVM Only)	215	68209	69023	21870	LDF	814

=== 2021 ===
2021 Kerala Legislative Assembly election: Kuthuparamba
Party	Candidate	Votes	%	±%
RJD	K. P. Mohanan	70,626	45.36	▼0.28
IUML	Pottankandi Abdulla	61,085	39.23	▲1.96
BJP	C. Sadanandan Master	21,212	13.62	▼3.06
Majority		9,541	7.5	−0.87
Turnout		154,826	79.76	0.33
Registered electors		1,94,124		
LDF hold		Swing		

=== 2016 ===
There were 1,81,095 registered voters in the constituency for the 2016 election.

2016 Kerala Legislative Assembly election: Kuthuparamba
Party	Candidate	Votes	%	±%
CPI(M)	K. K. Shailaja	67,013	45.64	−
JD(U)	K. P. Mohanan	54,722	37.27	−
BJP	C. Sadanandan Master	20,787	16.68	▲7.43
SDPI	Muhammad Shabeer K. C.	1,681	1.14	−
Independent	K. P. Mohanan Vedichalil	1,041	0.71	−
NOTA	None of the above	501	0.34	−
Independent	K. P. Mohanan Hridayam	355	0.24	−
Independent	K. Raghunathan	296	0.20	−
Independent	Shylaja Prashanth	265	0.18	−
Independent	Shylaja Nelliyulla Parambath	163	0.11	−
Margin of victory		12,291	8.37	
Turnout		1,46,824	79.43	▼0.36
CPI(M) gain from SJ(D)		Swing		

=== 2011 ===
There were 1,60,335 registered voters in the constituency for the 2011 election.

2011 Kerala Legislative Assembly election: Kuthuparamba
Party	Candidate	Votes	%	±%
SJ(D)	K. P. Mohanan	57,164	44.68	
INL	S. A. Puthiya Valappil	53,861	42.10	
BJP	O. K .Vasu	11,835	9.25	
Independent	K. P. Mohanan	1,982	1.55	
Independent	S. Poovalappil	1,199	0.94	
Independent	K. P. Mohanan	1,130	0.88	
Independent	Sulaim T. B.	758	0.59	
Margin of victory		3,303	2.58	
Turnout		1,27,929	79.79	
SJ(D) gain from CPI(M)		Swing		

== See also ==
- Kuthuparamba
- Peringalam Assembly constituency
- Kannur district
- List of constituencies of the Kerala Legislative Assembly
- 2016 Kerala Legislative Assembly election
