= List of schools in Kannur district =

Kannur is one of 14 districts along the west coast in the southern state of Kerala, India. It has a population of over 2.4 million people.

There are fifteen blocks within Kannur and all schools are divided into blocks, and then subdivided into clusters. Schools are operated by the government, private trusts, or individuals. Schools are affiliated with either the Indian Certificate of Secondary Education (ICSE), the Central Board for Secondary Education (CBSE), Kerala State Education Board or the National Institute of Open Schooling.

In most private schools, English is the language of instruction. In government run schools, English or Malayalam are offered as the language of instruction.

== Kannur Area ==
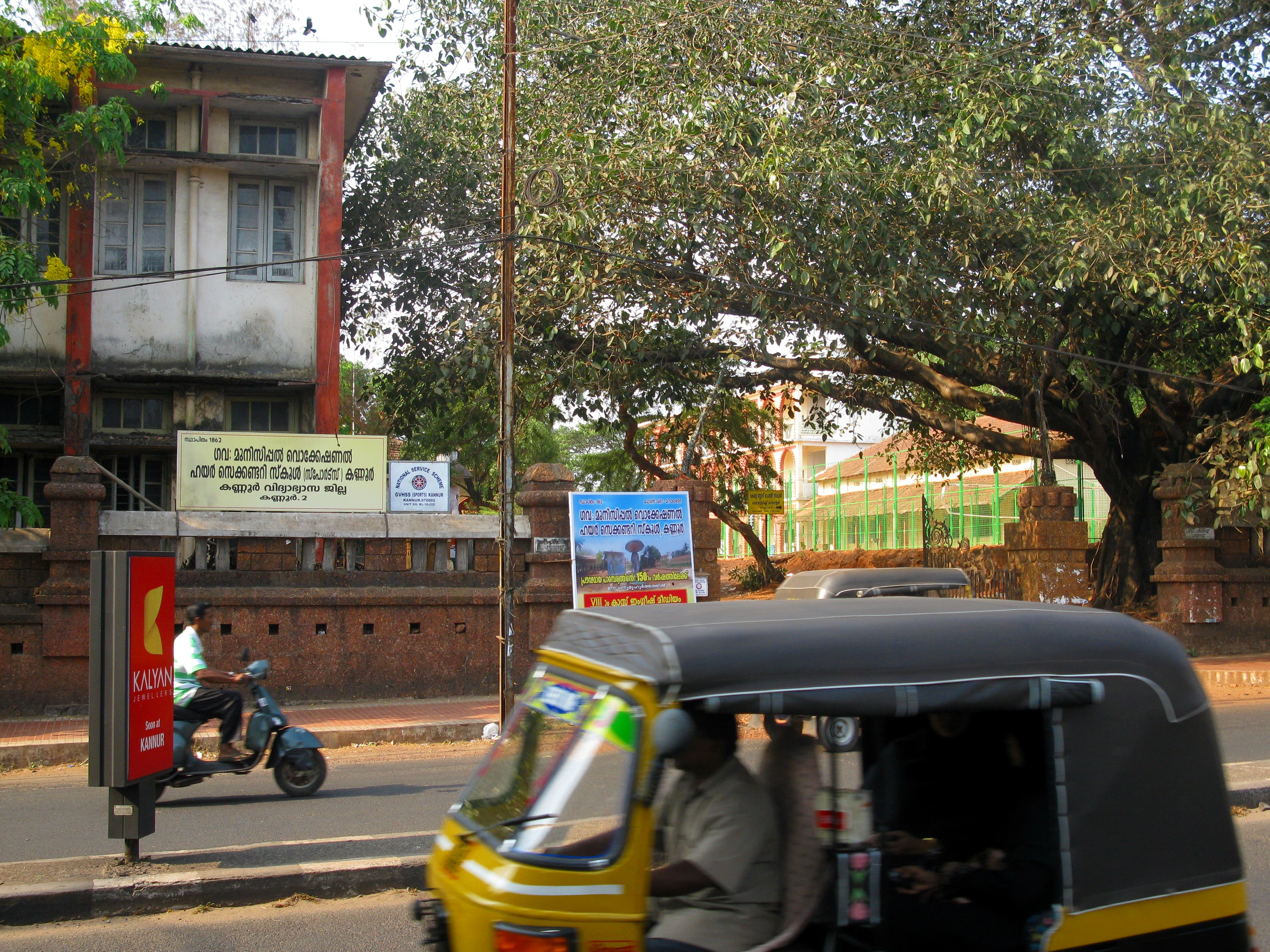
Municipal Highschool, Talap is one of the oldest schools in the city of Kannur

- St. Francis School, Thottada
- Municipal High School, Talap
- Sreepuram School, Talap
- S.N.Vidya Mandir, Kannur
- Chinmaya Vidyalaya, Kannur
- Seventh-day Adventist School, Kannur
- Central School, Kannur
- St. Michael's Boys School, Kannur
- St. Teresa's Girls School, Kannur
- Army School, Kannur
- Amrita Vidyalam, Kannur
- GHSS Cherukunnu, Kannur
- RIMS International School, Kannur
- Ursuline Senior Secondary School, Kannur

== Thalassery Area ==
- Basel Evangelical Mission Parsi High School
- Sacred Heart Girls' High School
- St Joseph's Higher Secondary School
- GVHSS Kadirur
- Bright English School
- Palayathu Vayal Government Upper Primary School
- Rajeev Gandhi Memorial Higher Secondary School, Mokeri

== Taliparamba Area ==
- Central School, Mangattuparamba
- Bharathiya Vidya Bhavan, Taliparamba
- Al Maquar School, Taliparamba

== Payyanur Area ==
- Navodaya Vidyalaya, Chendayad
- Central School, Payyannur

== Iritty Area ==
- St. Anne's School, Payyavoor
- Alphonsa School, Keezhpally
