= Peringalam Assembly constituency =

Constituency of the Kerala Legislative Assembly

Coordinates: 11.73°N 75.58°E

Peringalam
- Former constituency for the Kerala Legislative Assembly

Constituency details
- Country: India
- Region: South India
- State: Kerala
- District: Kannur
- Established: 1965
- Abolished: 2008
- Total electors: 1,48,842 (2006)
- Reservation: None

Peringalam State Assembly constituency was one of the 140 state legislative assembly constituencies in Kerala in southern India, before the 2008 delimitation of constituencies. It was one of the seven state legislative assembly constituencies included in Vatakara Lok Sabha constituency until the 2008 delimitation. The last election to the constituency was conducted in 2006, and the MLA was K. P. Mohanan of JD(S).

After the delimitation in 2008, Kariyad, Kunnothuparamba, Mokeri, Panoor, Pattiom, Peringalam, and Thrippangottur Gram Panchayats became a part of Kuthuparamba Assembly constituency, whereas Chokli and Panniyannur were added to Thalassery Assembly constituency.

== Local self-governed segments ==
Peringalam Assembly constituency was composed of the following local self-governed segments:

Sl no.	Name	Status (Grama panchayat/Municipality)	Taluk	Now part of
1	Kariyad	Grama panchayat	Thalassery	Kuthuparamba constituency
2	Kunnothuparamba	Grama panchayat	Thalassery	Kuthuparamba constituency
3	Mokeri	Grama Panchayat	Thalassery	Kuthuparamba constituency
4	Panoor	Grama panchayat (Now municipality)	Thalassery	Kuthuparamba constituency
5	Pattiom	Grama panchayat	Thalassery	Kuthuparamba constituency
6	Peringalam	Grama panchayat	Thalassery	Kuthuparamba constituency
7	Thrippangottur	Grama panchayat	Thalassery	Kuthuparamba constituency
8	Chokli	Grama panchayat	Thalassery	Thalassery constituency
9	Panniyannur	Grama panchayat	Thalassery	Thalassery constituency

== Election history ==
Election	Votes polled	Winner				Runner-up 1				Runner-up 2				Margin of victory	
Year		Name	Party	Votes		Name	Party	Votes		Name	Party	Votes		Votes	Percent
Constituency defunct as a result of delimitation (2011)
2006	111366 (74.8%)	K. P. Mohanan	JD(S)	57840	51.94%	Abdul Khader	IUML	38604	34.66%	A. Ashokan	BJP	9381	8.42%	19236	17.27%
2001	111728 (77.3%)	K. P. Mohanan	JD(S)	52657	47.14%	K. K. Muhammad	IUML	45679	40.89%	K. Satyaprakasan Master	BJP	9702	8.69%	6978	6.25%
1996	108621 (71.1%)	P. R. Kurup	JD	51921	50.02%	K. M. Soopy	IUML	37841	36.45%	Panniannur Chandran	BJP	10306	9.93%	14080	13.57%
1991	103745 (73.4%)	K. M. Soopy	IUML	49183	48.81%	P. R. Kurup	JD	47534	47.17%	O. K. Vasu Master	BJP	2186	2.17%	1649	1.64%
1987	91676 (79.4%)	P. R. Kurup	JNP	41694	45.77%	E. T. Mohammed Basheer	IUML	41338	45.38%	Gopalan Parambath	BJP	7658	8.41%	356	0.39%
1985*	91676 (79.4%)	E. T. Mohammed Basheer	AIML	42410		P. K. Muhammad	IUML	30668		C. K. Sreenivasan	Ind.	4865		11742	
1982	68444 (72.7%)	N. A. Mammoo Haji	AIML	38825	57.25%	K. Janardhanan	INC	19973	29.45%	Gopalan Parambath	BJP	7914	11.67%	18852	27.80%
1980	71349 (76.9%)	A. K. Saseendran	INC (U)	33863	68.32%	K. C. Marar	JNP	32159	45.26%	Pattiom Sathyan	Ind.	840	1.18%	1704	23.06%
1977	66790 (78.3%)	P. R. Kurup	INC	33916	51.49%	B. K. Achuthan	JP	31958	48.51%	Only two candidates contested				1958	2.98%
Major delimitation of constituency
1970	60685 (76.3%)	K. M. Soopy	ISP	34003	57.09%	V. Ashokan	INC	25559	42.91%	Only two candidates contested				8444	14.18%
1967	53360 (78.2%)	P. R. Kurup	SSP	38701	74.81%	N. M. Nambiar	INC	13034	25.19%	Only two candidates contested				25667	49.62%
1965	55341 (80.8%)	P. R. Kurup	SSP	34580	63.59%	N. Madhusoodhanan Nambiar	INC	19797	36.41%	Only two candidates contested				14783	27.18%

* Bypoll

== Election results ==
Percentage change (±%) denotes the change in the number of votes from the immediate previous election.

=== 2006 ===
There were 1,48,842 registered voters in Peringalam Constituency for the 2006 Kerala Niyamasabha Election.

2006 Kerala Legislative Assembly election: Peringalam
Party	Candidate	Votes	%	±%
JD(S)	K. P. Mohanan	57,840	51.94%	▲4.80
IUML	Abdul Khader	38,604	34.66%	▼6.23
BJP	Anilkumar	9,381	8.42%	▼0.27
Independent	Mohanan S/O Pokkan	2,684	2.41%	N/A
Independent	Mohanan S/O Kumaran	1,082	0.97%	N/A
Independent	Abdul Khader S/O Moideen Haji	932	0.84%	N/A
Independent	Abdul Khader Musliyar	843	0.76%	N/A
Margin of victory		19,236	17.27%	▲11.02
Turnout		1,11,366	74.83%	▼2.46
JD(S) hold		Swing	▲11.02	

=== 2001 ===
There were 1,44,564 registered voters in Peringalam Constituency for the 2001 Kerala Niyamasabha Election.

2001 Kerala Legislative Assembly election: Peringalam
Party	Candidate	Votes	%	±%
JD(S)	K. P. Mohanan	52,657	47.14%	▲47.14
IUML	K. K. Muhammad	45,679	40.89%	▲4.44
BJP	P. Satyaprakashan Master	9,702	8.69%	▼1.24
Independent	Kunhiparambath K. P. Mohanan	1,382	1.24%	N/A
Independent	Chathoth Muhammad	1,327	1.19%	N/A
Independent	Kattilparambath K. P. Mohanan	956	0.86%	N/A
Margin of victory		6,978	6.25%	N/A
Turnout		1,11,728	77.29%	
JD(S) gain from JD		Swing	N/A	

== See also ==
- Peringalam
- Kuthuparamba (State Assembly constituency)
- Kannur district
- List of constituencies of the Kerala Legislative Assembly
- 2006 Kerala Legislative Assembly election
