= Panniyannur =

- Census Town
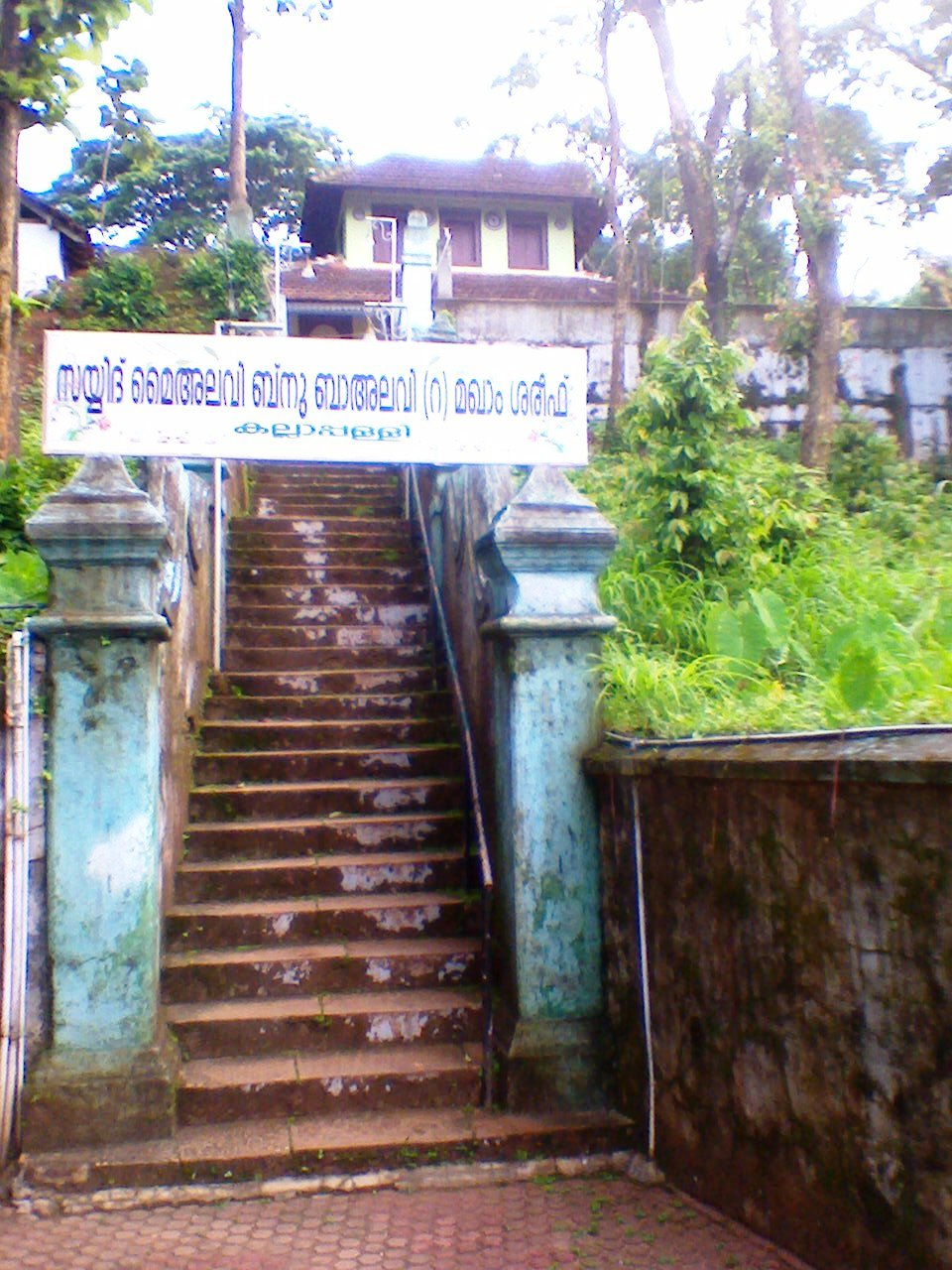
- Kallappally Mosque

- Location in Kerala, India Panniyannur (India)
- Coordinates: 11.7538000°N 75.5528400°E
- Country: India
- State: Kerala
- District: Kannur

Government
  - Type: Panchayati raj (India)

Area
  - Total: 10.02 km^{2} (3.87 sq mi)

Population (2011)
  - Total: 22,308
  - Density: 2,226/km^{2} (5,766/sq mi)
- Time zone: UTC+5:30 (IST)
- ISO 3166 code: IN-KL

Panniyannur is a census town in Thalassery taluk of Kannur district in the Indian state of Kerala.

== Demographics ==
As of 2011 Census, Panniyannur had a population of 22,308. Males constitute 45% of the population and females 55%. Panniyannur census town has an area of 10.02 km^{2} (3.87 sq mi) with 4,866 families residing in it. Average sex ratio was 1120 higher than state average of 1084. Panniyannur had average literacy rate of 97.3%, higher than the state average of 94%: male literacy was 98.2% and female literacy was 96.7%. In Panniyannur, 10.8% of the population was under 6 years of age.

== Location ==
Panniyannur is located 8 km from the town of Tellichery or Thalassery. The same is surrounded by the places like Chokli, Mahedistrict, Kadirur, Mokery, Panoor. personalities like Moyarath Shankaran, Thayatt Shankaran and M. V. Devan are from this village.

== Transportation ==
The national highway (NH66) passes through Thalassery town, NewMahe and Mahe(puduchery).Goa and Mumbai can be accessed on the northern side and Cochin and Thiruvananthapuram can be accessed on the southern side. The road to the east of Iritty connects to Mysore and Bangalore. The nearest railway station is Thalassery on Mangalore-Palakkad line. Trains are available to almost all parts of India subject to advance booking over the internet. There are airports at Kannur and Calicut. Both of them are international airports but direct flights are available only to Middle Eastern countries.
