= Kanavu =

Kanavu may refer to:

- Kanavu (school), an alternative school/commune in Kerala, India
- Kanavu (film), a 1954 Indian Tamil-language film
