= List of educational institutions in Kannur district =

Educational Institutions in Kannur, Kerala

This is a list of the educational institutions in Kannur District, State of Kerala, India.

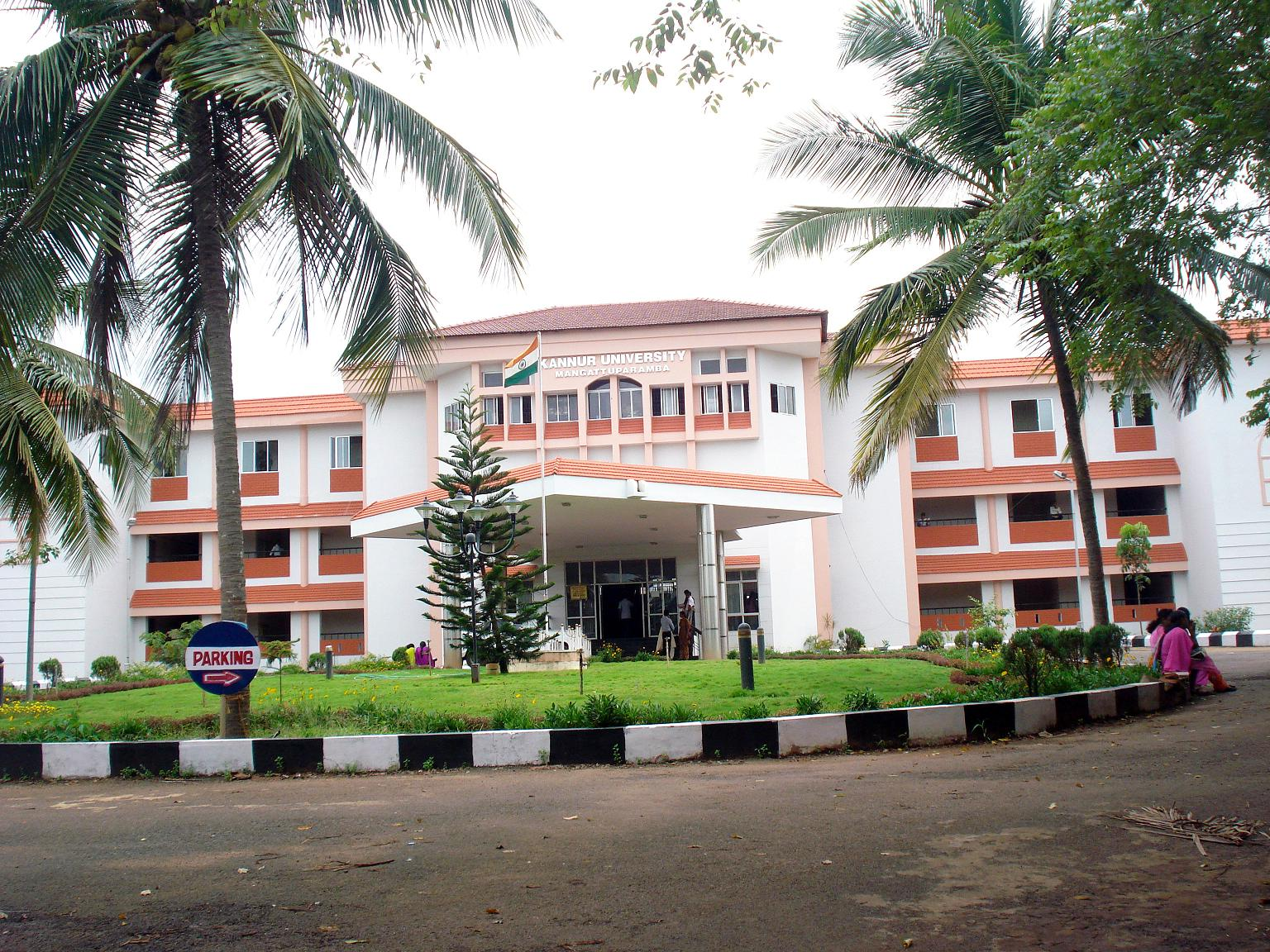
Kannur University

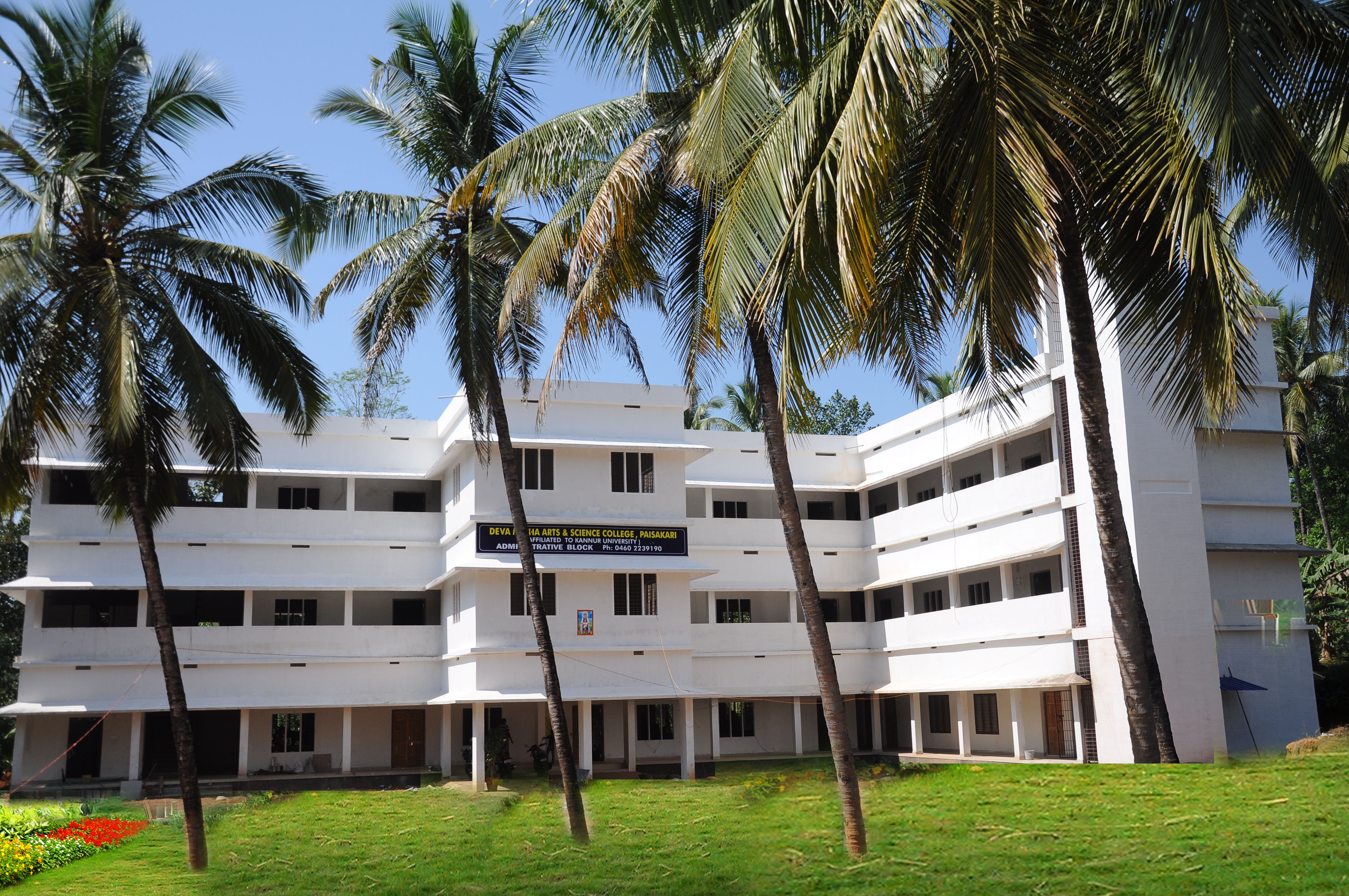
Paisakary College

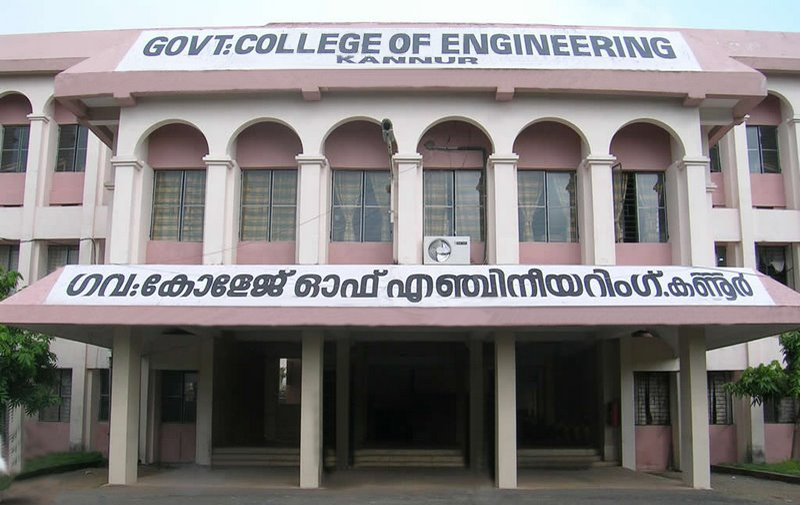
Mangad Engineering College

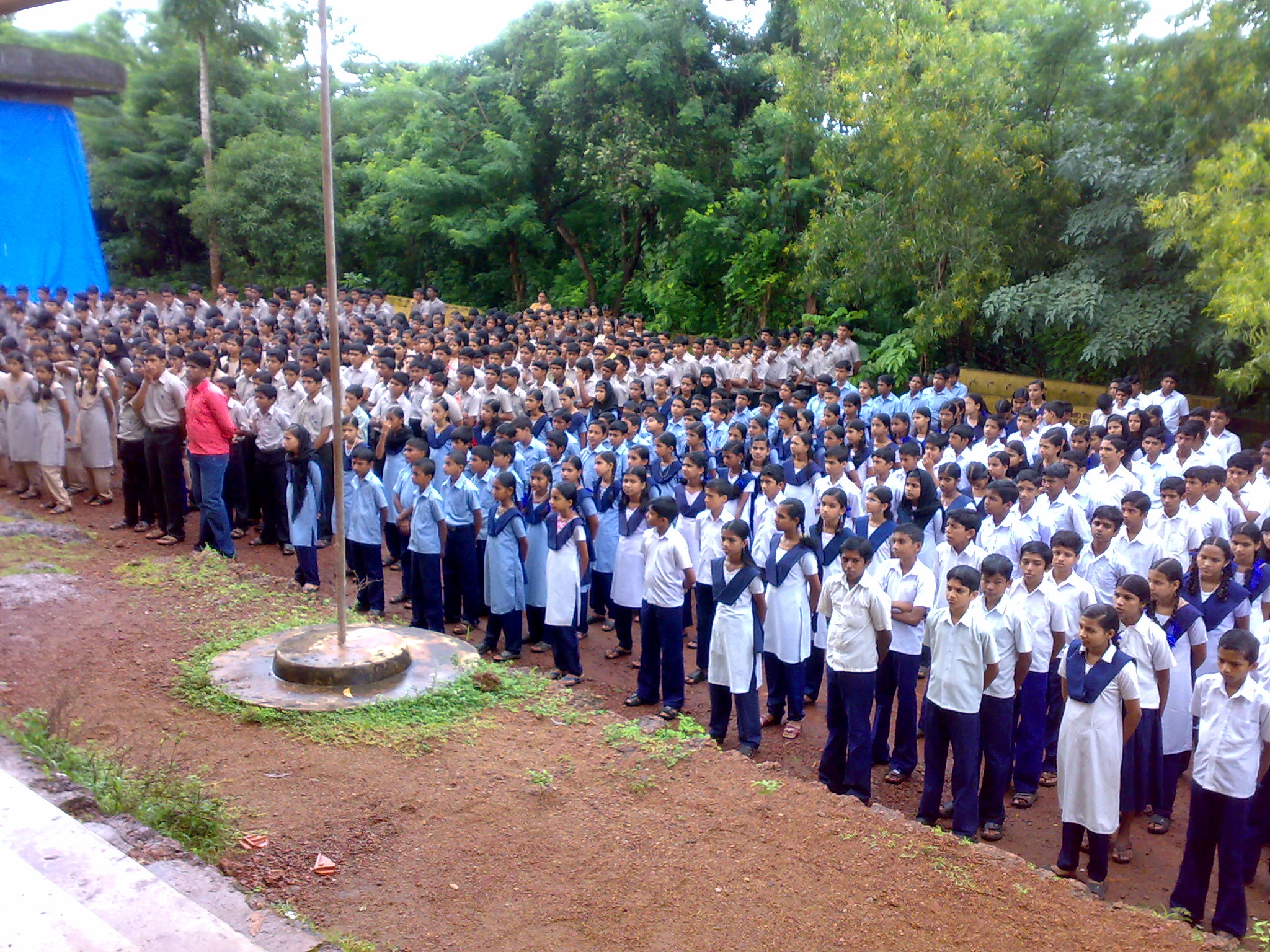
Kadannappally School

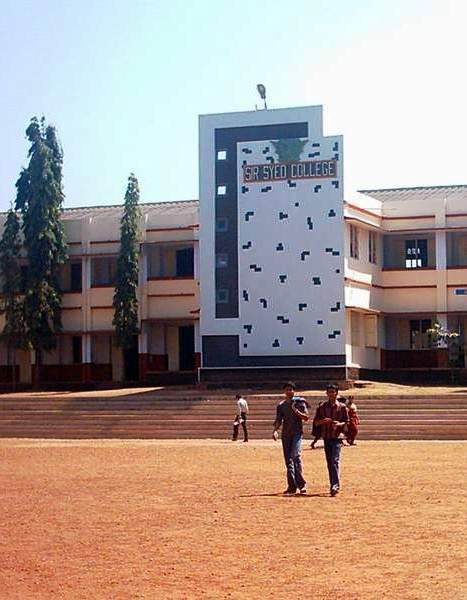
Sir Syed College, Taliparamba

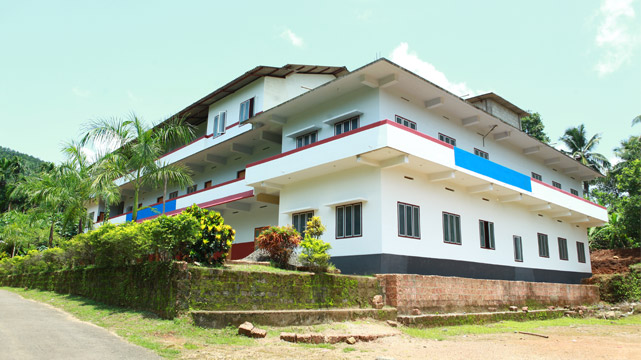
Navajyothi College, Kannikkalam

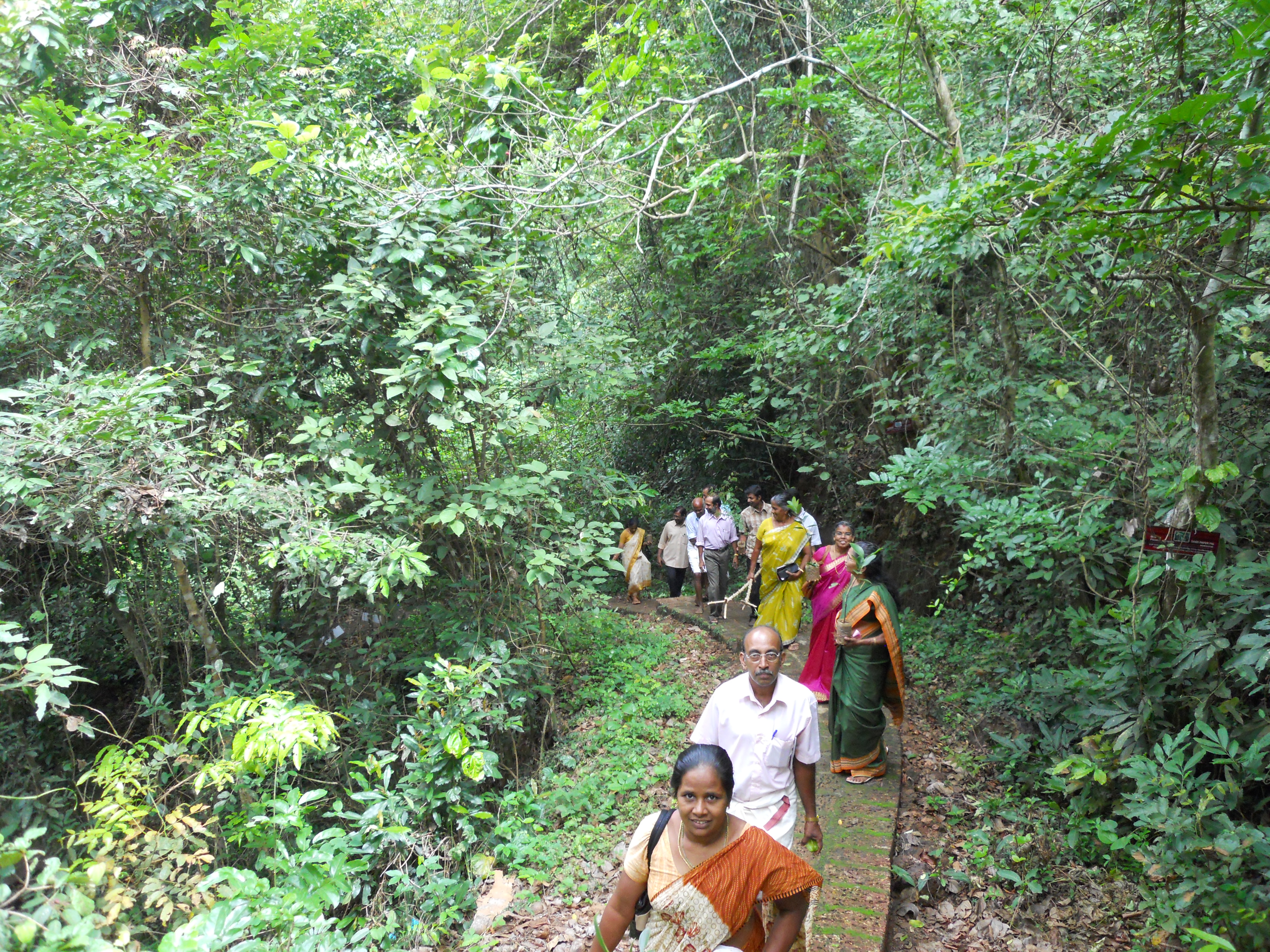
Karimbam Biodiversity Center

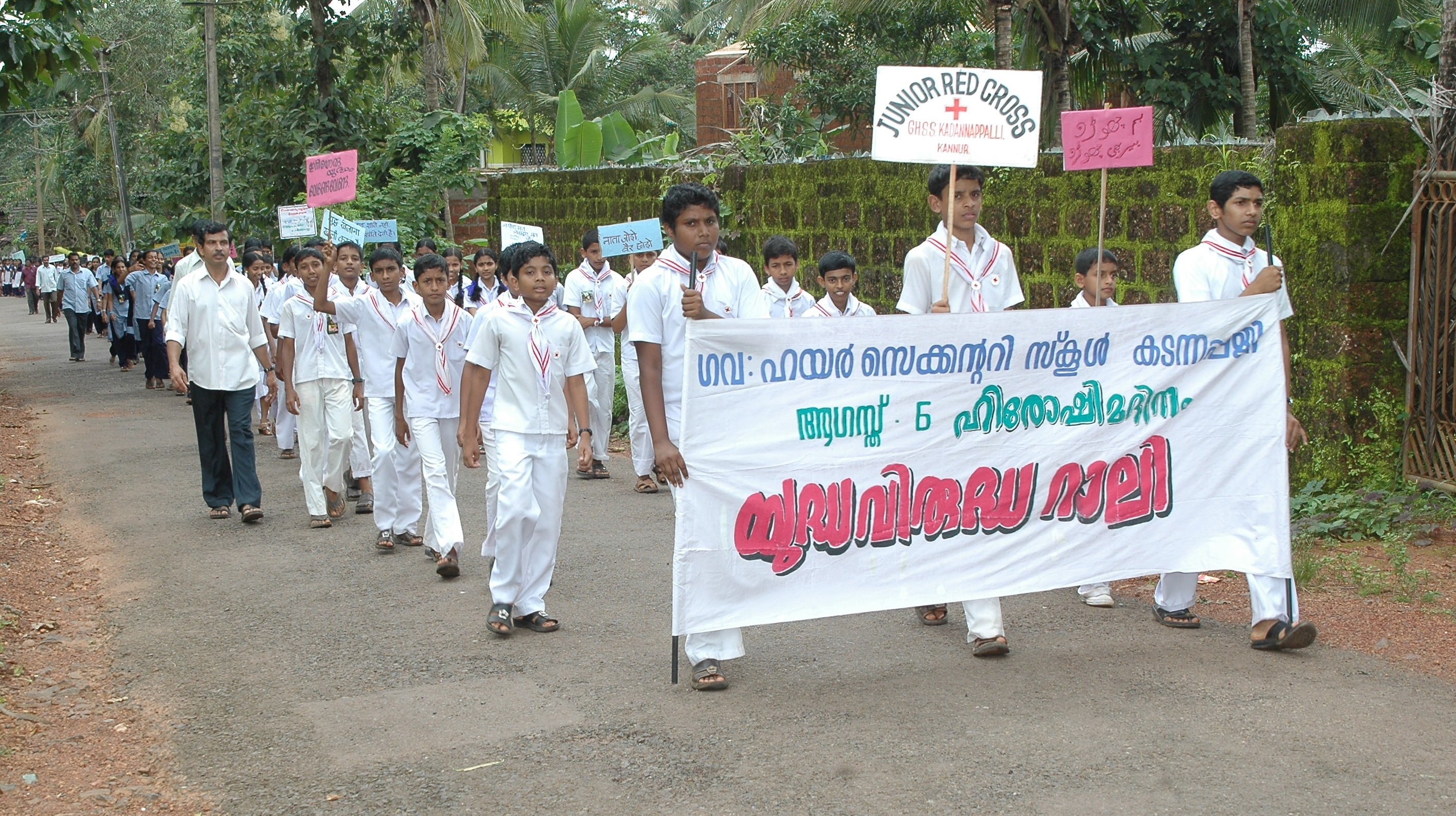
School children in Pilathara

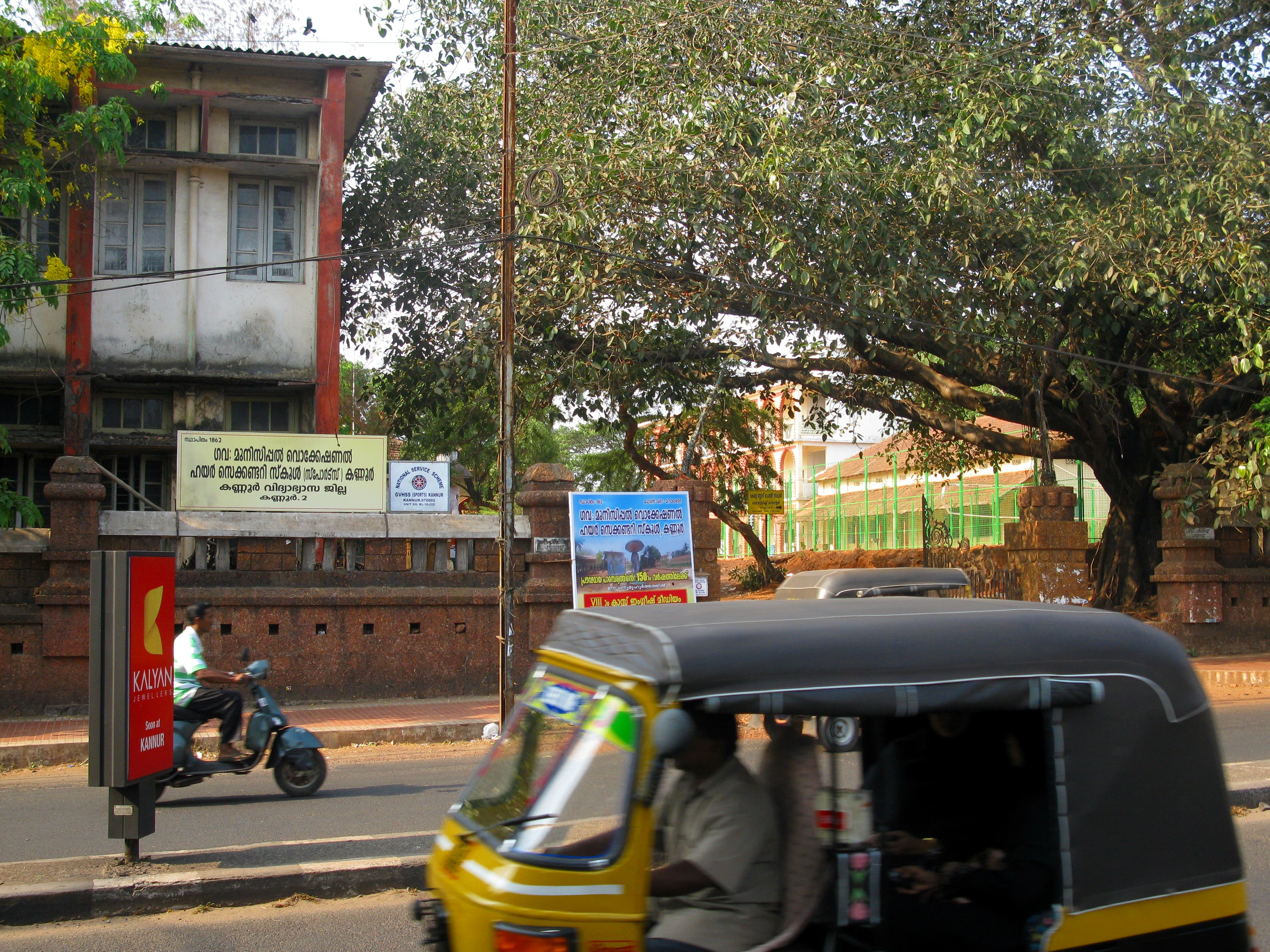
Municipal High School, Kannur

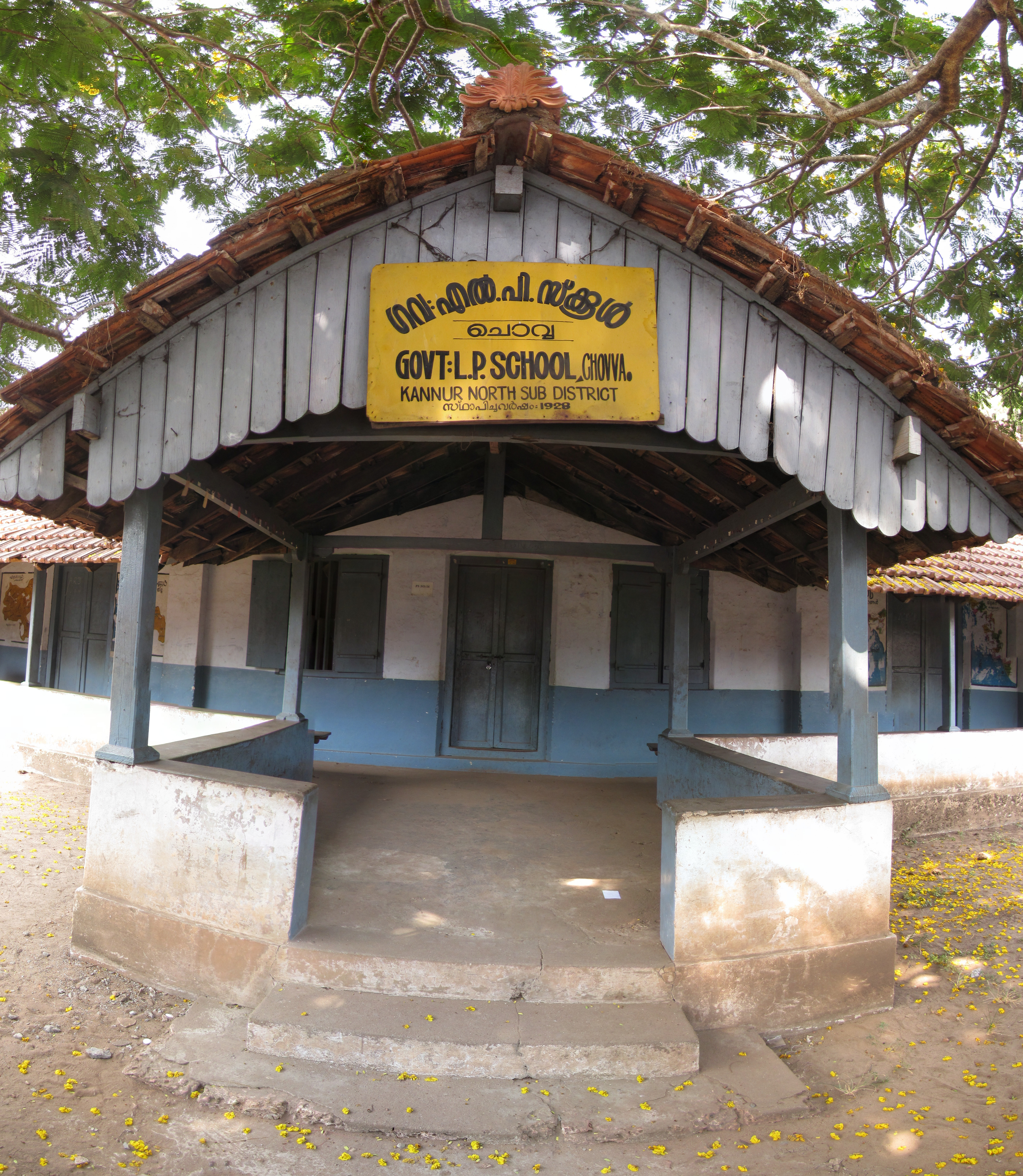
Chovva School

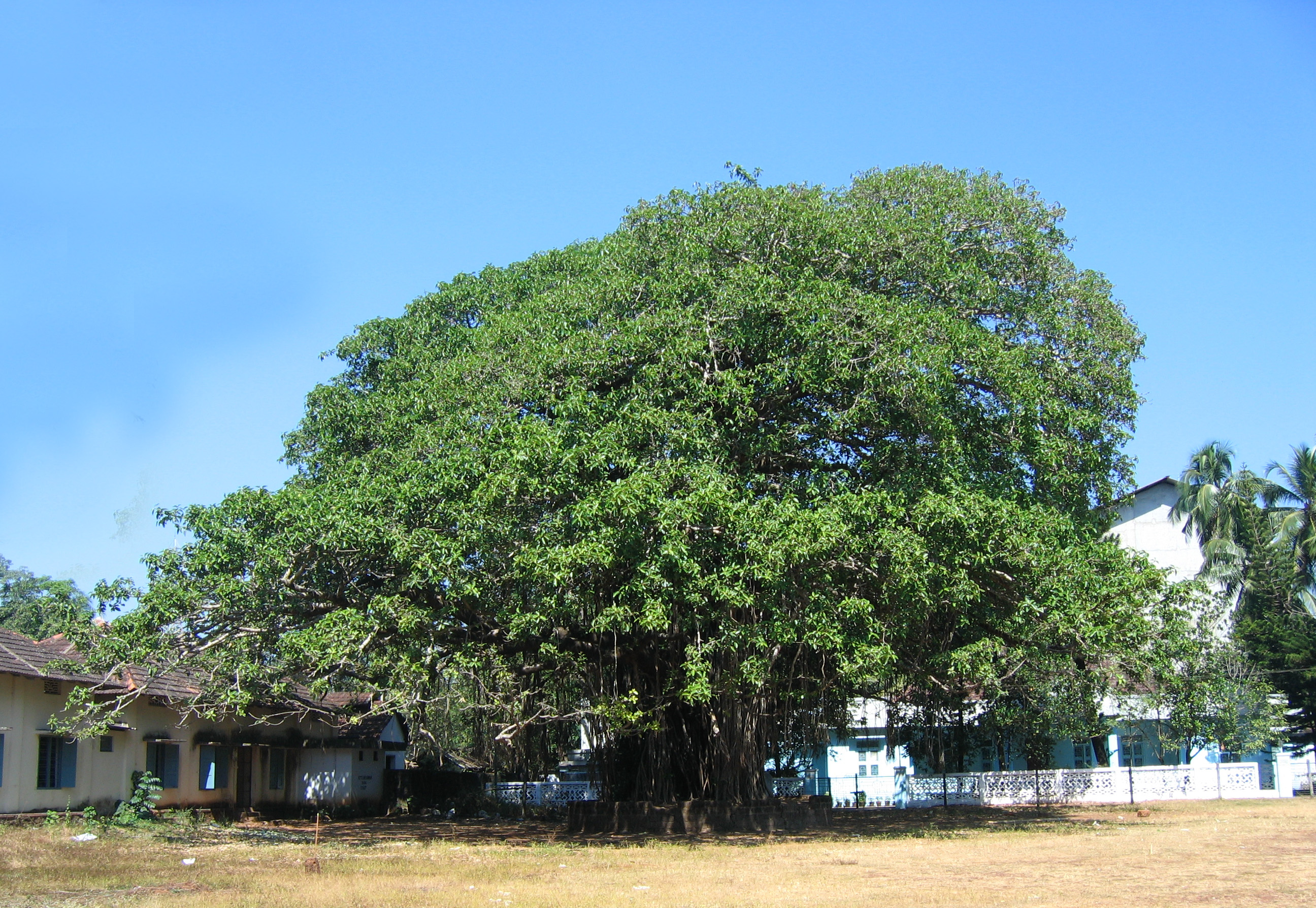
Science Park, Kannur

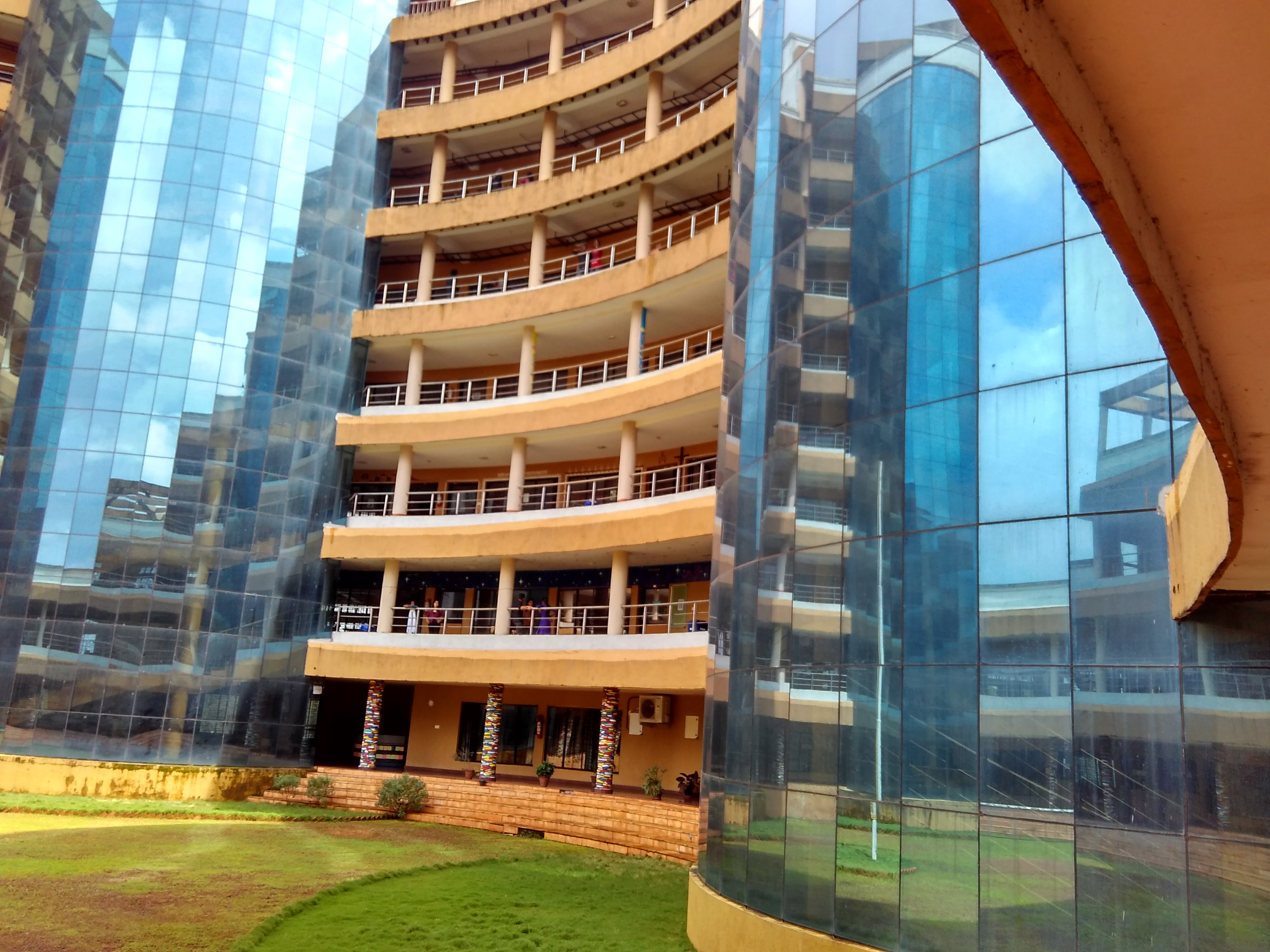
Fashion Technology Institute

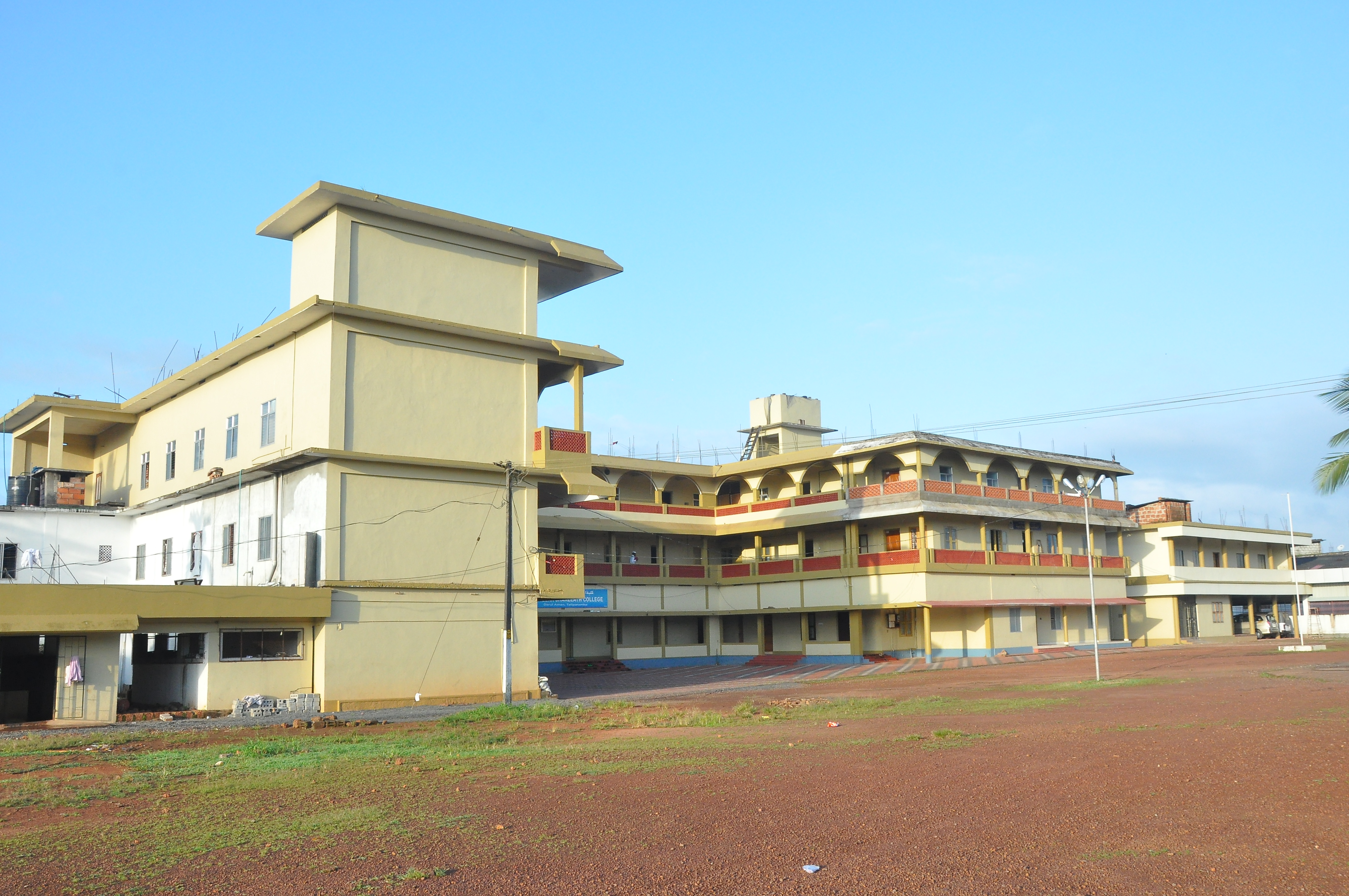
Al-Maqar Madrassa, Taliparamba

== Universities ==
- Kannur University, Thavakkara

== Medical Colleges ==
- Government Ayurveda College, Kannur
- Parrasianikkadavu Ayurveda Medical College, Kannur
- Kannur Dental College, Anjarakkandy
- Govt. Medical College, Pariyaram
- Kannur Medical College, Anjarakkandy

== Professional Colleges ==
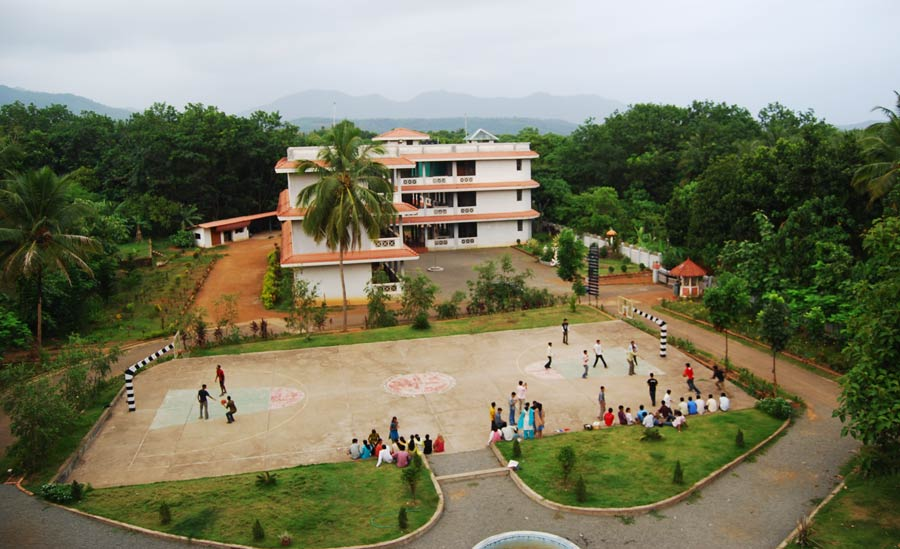
Vimal Jyothi Engineering College, Chemperi

- University Department of Engineering
- University Teacher Education College Puzhathi
- Sree Narayana Guru College of Engineering and Technology
- Jaybees Training College of B.Ed.
- Sir Syed Institute of Technology
- Aditya Kiran College of Applied Studies
- S.U.M.College of Teacher Education, Varam
- Salafi B.Ed.College Kanhirode
- Government College of Engineering
- Govt.College of Teacher Education Thalassery
- St Thomas college of engineering and technology (STM), Sivapuram, Mattanur
- College of Engineering Thalassery Eranholi
- Keyi Sahibtraining College Taliparamba
- Sir Syed Institute for Technical Studies Taliparamba
- Chinmaya Institute of Technology Pathiriyad
- Vimal Jyothi Engineering College Chemperi
- Rajeev Memorial College of Teacher Education Mattannur
- P.K.M.College of Education Taliparamba
- Crescent B.Ed.College Payyannur
- Alsalama college of optometry and management studies, south bazar, makani

== Arts and Science Colleges ==
- Aditya Kiran College of Applied Studies, Kannur
- Bhaskara College of Arts, Kannur
- Chinmaya Arts and Science for Women, Kannur
- College of Applied Science, Kuthuparamba
- College of Applied Science, Neruvambram
- College of Applied Science, Taliparamba
- Co-Operative Arts and Science College, Pazhayangadi
- Devamatha Arts and Science College, Paisakari
- Govt. Brennen College, Thalasery
- Gurudev Arts and Science College, Mathil
- I.T.M. College of Arts and Science, Kannur
- Jamia Hamdard, Kannur
- Krishna Menon Memorial women's College, Kannur
- M.G. College, Iritty
- Mahatma Gandhi Arts and Science, Kannur
- Mary Matha Arts and Science College, Alakode
- M M Knowledge Arts And Science College, Karakund
- N.A.M. College, Kallikandy
- Nirmalagiri College, Kuthuparamba
- Payyanur College, Payyannur
- Pazhassi raja N.S.S. College, Mattanur
- S.E.S. College, Sreekandapuram
- S. N. College, Kannur
- Sir Syed College, Taliparamba
- Sir Syed Institute for Technical Studies, Taliparamba
- Sree Sankaracharya University of Sanskrit, Payyannur
- Taliparamba Arts and Science College, Taliparamba

== Indian Certificate of Secondary Education|ICSE Schools ==
- Sreepuram School, Kannur
- Seventh Day School, Iritty
- St. Francis School, Thottada
- St. Anne's School, Payyavoor.

== Central Board of Secondary Education|CBSE Schools ==
- Al Maquar School, Thangalpeedika
- Alphonsa School, Keezhpally
- Amritha Vidyalayam (Kannur, Kuthuparamba and Punnol)
- Army Public School, Kannur
- Benhill School, Iritty
- Bharathiya Vidya Bhavan (Taliparamba, and Kannur)
- Chinmaya Vidyalaya (Kannur, Taliparamba and Payyanur)
- CMI Christ School, Thalassery
- Crescent SChool, Valapattanam
- Dr. Gundert School, Tellicherry
- Ezhimala School, Ramanthali
- Fazl Omar School, Koodali
- Fusco School, Eruvessy
- Gracious School, Mayyil
- Holy Cross School, Naduvil
- ISD SChool, Payyannur
- Indira Gandhi School, Mambram
- Ishlahi School, Irikkur
- Jawahar Navodaya Vidyalaya, Chendayadu
- Kadambbur School, Etakkad
- Kaoser School, Pulloopy
- Kendiriya Vidyalaya, Kannur
- Kendriya Vidyalaya, Mangattuparamba
- Kendriya Vidyalaya, Payyannur
- Latheefiya School, Payyannur
- MES School, Panoor
- Little Flower School, Karuvanchal
- Majlis School, Uliyil
- Malabar School, Koottumugham
- Mary Matha School, Pilathara
- Marygiri School, Koottumugham
- Modern School, Taliparamba
- Nithyananda School, Chirakkal
- Navajyothi School, Peravoor
- PES School, Payyanur
- Perfect School, Muzhappilangad
- Progressive School, Payangadi
- Royal School, Taliparamba
- Sal Sabeel School, Sreekandapuram
- Safa School, Mattool
- Sanjos School, Taliparamba
- Sree Narayana School, Punnol
- Sree Narayana School, Kuthuparmba
- SN Vidya Mandir, Kannur
- Sree Sankara Vidya Peedam, Mattannur
- St.Mary's School, Alakode
- Tellicherry Public SChool, Kindoormala
- Thunchathacharya Vidyalayam, Edachovva
- Urusuline School, Kannur
- Kasthurba Public School, Chirakkal
- Zahra Public School, Thangalpeedika, Mokeri

== Kerala Syllabus High Schools ==
- Aroli GHSS
- Azhikkal GRFT VHSS
- Azhikode GHSS
- Chala GHSS
- Chatukapara GHSS
- Chelora GHSS
- Cherukkunnu Welfare GHSS
- Cherukunnu Boys GHSS
- Cherukunnu GVHSS
- Cheruthazham GHSS
- Chuzhali GHSS
- Ettikulam M.A.Sahib Smaraka GHSS
- Iriukkur GHSS
- Jamia Al-Maqar, Taliparamba
- Kadannapally GHSS
- Kallisassery KPRG Smaraka GHSS
- Kaniyanchal GHSS
- Kannadiparamba GHSS
- Kannur City GHSS
- Kannur GVHSS for Girls
- Kannur GVHSS
- Kannur Town GHSS
- Karivellur AV Smaraka GHSS
- Karthikapuram GVHSS
- Korome GHSS
- Kottila GHSS
- Koyyam GHSS
- Kozhichal GHSS
- Kuhimangalam GHSS
- Kurumathur GVHSS
- Madayi GBHSS /GVHSS
- Madayi GGHSS
- Malapattam AKS GHSS
- Mathamangalam GHSS
- Mathil GHSS
- Mattool CHMKS GHSS
- Mayyil IMNS GHSS
- Morazha GHSS
- Munderi GHSS
- Muzhapilangad GHSS
- Neduungome GHSS
- Padiyoor GHSS
- Pallikunnu GHSS
- Pappinissery E M S SmarakaGHSS
- Pariyaram KKNPM GVHSS
- Pattuvam GHSS
- Pattuvam Model Res.H.SS
- Payyannur GGHSS
- Payyanur AKAS GVHSS
- Payyannur NSS Memorial GHSS
- Peralasery AKG Smaraka GHSS
- Peringome GHSS
- Prapoil GHSS
- Puliongome GVHSS
- Puzhathi GHSS
- Ramanthali GHSS
- Sreekandapuram GHSS
- Sreeppuram GHSS
- St. Michael's AIHSS, Kannur
- Taliparamba Tagore Vidayaniketan
- GHSS (GVHSS)
- Thirumeni GHSS
- Thottada GHSS
- Ulikkal P.K.Panchayath GHSS
- Valapattanam GHSS
- Vayakara GHSS
- Vellur GHSS
- Alakode NSS HSS
- Anjarakanday HSS
- Azhikode HSS
- Chadanakkampara Cherupushpa HSS
- Chapparapadavu HSS
- Chembilode HSS
- Chempanthotty St George HS
- Chempery Nirmla HSS
- Cherupuzha St Marys HS
- Chirakkal Rajas HSS
- Chov va HSS
- Elayavoor CHM HSS
- Kadacharia HSS
- Kadambur HSS
- Kambil Moplia HSS
- Kannur DIS Girls HSS
- Kannur St Michles Anglo Ind HSS
- Kannur St Teresa Anglo.Ind. HSS
- Payyannur St Marys Girls HS
- Kudianmala Mary Queen HSS
- Madampam Maryland HS
- Manikadavu St Thomas HS
- Naduvil HSS
- Nellikutty St Augustine HS
- Paisakkary Devamatha HSS
- Parassinikadavu HSS
- Payyavoor Sacred Heart HSS
- Perumpadavu BVJM HSS
- Pulikurumba St Joseph HS
- Puthiyangadi Jamat HSS
- Moothedath Higher Secondary School
- Seethi Sahib H S S, Taliparamba
- Thaynery SABTM HSS,
- Thertally Mary Giri HS
- Thottada S.N.Trust HSS
- Vayattuparmba St Joseph HSS
- Vellora Tagore HSS
- Taliparamba Sir Syed HS
- Bekkalam Jaybees Public HS
- Cherupuzha St Joseph ENG.MED. HSS
- Irikkur Rehmaniya Orphanage HSS
- Thiruvattur Jama-ath HS
- Kannur Deenul Sabha ENG.MED HSS
- Madai Crescent English Med. HSS
- Mattool Najath Girls HSS
- Muttam Rehmaniya HS
- Naduvil St.Mary's E.M.HS
- Narath Falah Eng.Med.HS
- Pappinissery Hidayath Eng.Med. HS
- Payyangadi Wadi Huda HSS
- Payyannur Khayidemllath Mem HSS Kavvayi
- Pushpagiri St.Joseph HS
- Ramanathali CHM Koya Mem HS
- Valapattanam Tajul Uloom Orphanage HSS
- Valapattanam Muslim W A HSS
- Aralam GHSS
- Aralam Farm GHS
- ChavasseryGHSS
- Cherakkra GHSS (GVHSS)
- GVHSS Kadirur (Government VHSS Kadirur)
- Cheruvanchery P.G Memorial GHSS
- Chittariparamba GHSS
- Chundangapoil GHSS
- Edayannur GHSS (GVHSS)
- Kavumbhagam GHSS
- Koduvally GVHSS
- Kottayam (Malabar) GHSS
- Kuthuparamba GHSS
- Malur GHSS
- Mambram GHSS
- Manathana GHSS
- Pala GHSS
- Palayad GHSS
- Pattiam GHSS
- Pinarayi A.K.G.M. GHSS
- Thalassery GGHSS
- Thalassery Brennen GHSS
- Thiruvangad GHSS
- Vadakkumpad GHSS
- Vengad E.K.Nayanar Smaraka GHSS
- Adakatodu St Joseph HS
- Angadikadavu Sacret Heart HSS
- Chokli VP Oriental HS
- Chokly Ramavilasam HSS
- Chothavoor H.S S. Champad
- Edoor St Mary's HSS
- Iritty HSS
- Kadavathur VHSS
- Karikottakkari St Thomas HS
- Kariyad Nambiars HSS
- Kavumpadi CHM HSS
- Kelakam St Thomas HSS
- Kilianthara St. Thomas HSS
- Kodiyeri Oniyan HS
- Kolakad Santhome HSS
- Kolavalloor HSS
- Kolayad St Cornelius HSS
- Koodali HSS
- Kottayam Rajas HS
- Kottiyoor IJM HSS
- Kunnoth St Joseph HS
- Kuthuparamba HS
- Mambram HSS
- Mattannoor HSS
- Rajeev Gandhi Memorial HSS, mokeri
- New Mahe MM HSS
- Olavilm Ramakrishna HS
- Panoor P.R.Mem.HSS
- Panoor K.K.V. Memorial HSS
- Pattannur KPC HSS
- Peravoor St Joseph HS
- Peringathur NAM Memorial HSS
- Sivapuram HSS
- Thalasserry MMHSS
- Thalasserry Sacred Heart HSS
- Thalassery BEMP HSS
- Thalassery St Joseph HSS
- Velimanam St.Seb.HSS
- Kelakam Little Flower HS
- Zahra HSS-Mokeri
- Kadathumkadav St. John Baptist Eng. Med. H
- Nirmalagiri Ranijai HSS
- Peringadi Indian Public School
