= Puthoor (Kannur) =

- Village
- Location in Kerala, India Puthoor (India)
- Coordinates: 11.7755°N 75.6033°E
- Country: India
- State: Kerala
- District: Kannur
- Taluk: Thalassery

Government
  - Type: Panchayati raj (India)
  - Body: Kunnothuparamba Grama Panchayat

Area
  - Total: 15.66 km^{2} (6.05 sq mi)

Population (2011)
  - Total: 19,575
  - Density: 1,250/km^{2} (3,237/sq mi)

Languages
  - Official: Malayalam, English
- Time zone: UTC+5:30 (IST)
- ISO 3166 code: IN-KL
- Vehicle registration: KL 58

Puthoor is a village in Thalassery taluk of Kannur district in Kerala state, India. Puthoor is located 15 km east of Thalassery and 10 km south of Kuthuparamba towns.

== Demographics ==
As of 2011 Census, Puthoor had a population of 19,575 which constitute 9,051 (46.2%) males and 10,524 (53.8%) females. Puthoor village has an area of 15.66 km^{2} (6.05 sq mi) with 4,224 families residing in it. The average sex ratio was 1163 higher than the state average of 1084. In Puthoor, 11.9% of the population was under 6 years of age. Puthoor had average literacy of 95% higher than state average of 94%; male literacy was 97.3% and female literacy was 93.1%.

== Administration ==
Puthoor village is part of Kunnothuparamba Grama Panchayat in Kuthuparamba Block Panchayat. Puthoor is politically part of Kuthuparamba (State Assembly constituency) under Vatakara Loksabha constituency.
