= K. P. Mohanan =

Indian politician

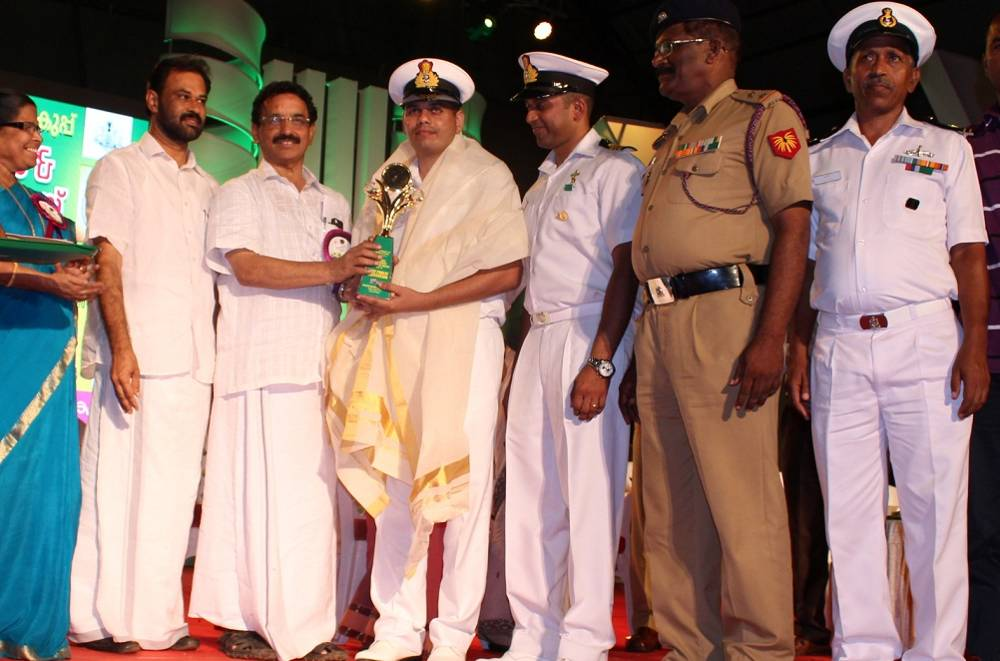

Member of Kerala Legislative Assembly
- In office May 2021 – May 2026
- Preceded by: K. K. Shailaja
- Succeeded by: P. K. Praveen
- Constituency: Kuthuparamba

Agriculture Minister of Kerala
- In office 18 May 2011 – 20 May 2016
- Preceded by: Mullakkara Ratnakaran
- Succeeded by: V. S. Sunil Kumar
- Constituency: Kuthuparamba

Personal details
- Born: 3 March 1950 (age 76) Puthoor, Kannur, Kerala, India
- Party: Rashtriya Janata Dal
- Spouse: Smt. Hemaja Mohanan
- Children: Ram Mohan; Ramila Mohan (Minnu); Rajila Mohan (Chinnu)

K. P. Mohanan is an Indian politician. He served as Kerala State Minister for Agriculture in UDF Cabinet from 18 May 2011 to 20 May 2016. He was the General Secretary of SJD based in Kerala. SJD was part of Congress-led UDF until it dissolved in 2014. He is a member of RJD. (Note: According to few sources) As a minister, Mohanan handled portfolios of Agriculture, Soil Conservation, Soil Survey, Warehousing Corporation, Agricultural University, Animal Husbandry, Veterinary University, Printing and Stationery.

== Early life ==
He was born at Puthoor near Panoor in Kannur district of Kerala on 3 March 1950.

He is the son of Kerala's former Minister Late Shri. P. R. Kurup and Late Smt. K.P. Leelavathy Amma. His father had been elected from Peringalam constituency in the third, fifth, eighth, and 10th elections to the Assembly. Before that, he was elected from the Koothupramba constituency in 1957, the first Assembly elections in reorganised Kerala, and again in 1960. He served as Minister for Irrigation and Cooperation from 1967 to 1969 in the E. M. S. Namboodiripad Ministry and as Forest and Transport Minister from 1996 to 1999 in the E. K. Nayanar Ministry.

C.V. Narayanan Gurukkal of the CVN Kalari was his grandfather's younger brother.

Mohanan completed his Pre-degree and A.M.A.E.S.I. (Aeronautical Engineering Diploma) at Nehru College, Coimbatore, and then worked as editor-in-chief for Padayani Daily, a National Socialist evening newspaper in Malayalam published from Thalassery. Mohanan worked in Qatar for a short time in photography, film processing, and sales in the colour Labs of Vegas and Salam Studio & Stores.

== Career ==
Mohanan started his political career as a member of ISO, the Student's Organization of socialist party. He held the post of state treasurer of ISO, and participated in many student movements and agitations. He became the member of Janatha party when it formed. He was elected as the Kannur district secretary of Yuva Janatha. He became a member of the National working committee of Janatha Dal and the Janatha Dal State committee. He served on the Kunnothu Paramba Gram Panchayat executive committee for 7 years. He was the president of Perigalam Mandalam state fencing association and member of the volleyball association and sports council.

Mohanan represented Peringalam constituency in the 2001 and 2006 Legislative assembly. In the 2011 assembly elections he won from Kuthuparamba constituency. He is the Parliamentary Board Chairman of Socialist Janatha (Democratic).

== Achievements ==
Mohanan won the first award instituted by Kerala NRI centre state committee for "People's MLA".

== Personal life ==
Mohanan's wife, Smt. Hemaja Mohanan, is from Perambra in Kozhikode district. He has three children, including son Ram Mohan, and daughters Rajila Mohan and Ramila Mohan.
