= Uyarum Njan Nadake =

Uyarum Njan Naadaake
- Directed by: P. Chandrakumar
- Screenplay by: P. M. Thaj
- Story by: K. C. Prabhakaran
- Based on: Keralathile Africa by K. Panoor
- Produced by: Kuttiyil Balan
- Starring: Mohanlal; Aruna; Venu Nagavally; Balan K. Nair
- Cinematography: S. J. Thomas
- Edited by: K. Rajagopal
- Music by: K. P. N. Pillai; Maniraja (Score)
- Production company: Marshal Pictures
- Distributed by: Murali Films
- Release date: 20 November 1985
- Country: India
- Language: Malayalam

Uyarum Njan Naadaake (transl. I will rise across the land) is a 1985 Indian Malayalam-language film directed by P. Chandrakumar and written by P. M. Thaj from a story by K. C. Prabhakaran. It was based on the book Keralathile Africa by K. Panoor. The film stars Mohanlal, Aruna, Venu Nagavally and Balan K. Nair in the lead roles. The film has musical score by K. P. N. Pillai. The film was a commercial success and Mohanlal's performance got critical acclaim.

== Cast ==
- Mohanlal as Darappan
- Mucherla Aruna as Lasitha
- Venu Nagavally as Vivek
- Balan K. Nair as Nambyar
- Chithra as Rajani
- Kuthiravattam Pappu as Thampi
- M. G. Soman as Master
- Madhuri as Uppatti
- Ramu as Rajendran
- Soorya as Jagamma
- T. G. Ravi as Kunjan
- Vijayaraghavan as Raghu
- Y. Vijaya as Vasumathi Amma
- Bhagyalakshmi as Manja
- Master Sona Balan as Palan
- Santo Krishnan as Moopan
- Kunjunni Kodakara as Mallan

== Soundtrack ==
The music was composed by K. P. N. Pillai and the lyrics were written by O. N. V. Kurup.

No.	Song	Singers	Lyrics	Length
1	"Indu Poornendu"	K. J. Yesudas, K. S. Chithra	O. N. V. Kurup	
2	"Kaattile Venthekkum"	K. J. Yesudas, Chorus	O. N. V. Kurup	
3	"Maathalathenunnaan"	V. T. Murali	O. N. V. Kurup	
4	"Thullithulli"	Chorus, V. T. Murali	O. N. V. Kurup	
