= K. J. Baby =

Indian writer and film director (1954–2024)

K. J. Baby (27 February 1954 − August or September 2024) was an Indian writer and film director from the Kerala state. He was a Dalit writer and followed left ideology. He worked for Tribal education throughout his life.

== Early life ==
Baby was born into a settler Christian family in Kannur. During his late teens, he shifted to Wayanad. He married Shirly and had two daughters, Geethi and Santhi. Shirly died in 2021. He used to take part in the cultural activities during the Naxal movement in 1970s.

== Career ==
Baby's literary works include Nadugaddika, Mavelimantam and Bespurkana. Mavelimantam won the Kerala Sahitya Akademi Award in 1994. Baby and his wife Shirly founded Kanavu, an alternative school/commune for Wayanad's Adivasi children. He directed the film Guda (The Cage, 2003) which told the story of Kattunayakar tribe.

Goodbye Malabar, the latest novel written by K.J. Baby, was released on 16 November 2019. K.J. Baby won the Bharat Bhavan award for the overall contribution and playwriting in the village drama 'Nadugaddika'.

== Awards ==
- Baby received Kerala Sahitya Akademi award in 1994.
- Bharat Bhavan award.

== Death ==
Baby's body was discovered from a fall near his house in Wayanad on 1 September 2024. He was 70.
