= Keralathile Africa =

Malayalam language travelogue

- Author: K. Panoor
- Language: Malayalam
- Genre: travelogue
- Publisher: National Book Stall
- Publication date: 1963
- Publication place: India
- Awards: UNESCO Award
- ISBN: 9789384075446

Keralathile Africa which literally means "Africa in Kerala" is a Malayalam language book written by Indian civil rights activist K. Panoor. In the book, he narrated the annoying scenes he saw during his official journey. The book, which depicts the realities of tribal life, caused a great deal of controversy. The book was published in 1963. It has become an important resource for students, researchers and government officials alike.

The book narrates the life of Wayanad before the migration from Travancore in the middle of the 20th century. This book, which belongs to the travel literature category, is divided into seven chapters and deals with the customs, practices and beliefs of various tribal communities in Wayanad district such as Adiyar, Kurichyar, Korakar, Paniyar, Kattu Nayakans and Kurumar and their living environment. The book is still an authoritative document in the field of tribal studies and research. The book is used as textbook in universities in Kerala.

== Background ==
Panoor started his career as an employee of the Revenue Department in the Kerala Government Service. Desiring to find a solution to the plight of the adivasis, he volunteered to serve in the Tribal Welfare Department and became the project director on deputation for the four districts of North Kerala. He wrote the book based on his experiences during the deputation period from 1958 to 1963.

== Controversies ==
This book was a matter of controversy even in the Kerala Legislative Assembly. The book officially brought out the landlords who enslaved the adivasis to work on their own farms in Wayanad. During the debate on the Land Reforms Act in the Kerala Legislative Assembly in 1964, O. P. Koran MLA raised the issue and as proof, he presented the book Keralathile Africa to the niyamasabha speaker. The newspapers made it a point of contention. Arguments arose as to whether the adivasis of Wayanad were slaves or not. It has even been argued that to say that slavery exists is treason. The government's solution to this problem was to confiscate copies of Keralathile Africa under National Security Act and take disciplinary action against the author. The book received UNESCO award at a time when the government was trying to confiscate the book and take disciplinary action against Panoor.

== Reception ==
Malayala Manorama writes that "Keralathile Africa" is a book that leads the readers to deep unrest. Prof. N. V. Krishna Warrier described the book as a book that disturbs the reader's sleep and fills it with unrest and discomfort.

== Awards ==
- UNESCO award
- Kerala Sahitya Akademi Award

== Adaptations ==
The 1985 Malayalam film Uyarum Njan Nadake directed by P. Chandrakumar with Mohanlal in the lead was based on the book Kealthile Africa.

== Continuation to the book ==
People started migrating to Wayanad from Travancore in the middle of the twentieth century. If Keralathile Africa refers to the life before that migration, in his next book Keralathile America (Meaning: America in Kerala) Panoor describes the effects of migration and its reactions on the adivasis.

== In popular culture ==
In the discussions on the development of Wayanad, it is often mentioned that Wayanad is not Africa in Kerala (Keralathile Africa) now.
