= Kadhirur Gurukkal =

Medieval Indian martial artist

Kadhirur Gurukkal, also known as Mathiloor Gurukkal, was a martial artist of medieval India. He came from Kadirur, near to Thalasserry in the North Malabar region of present-day Kerala. He operated the Mathiloor Kalari, where Thacholi Othenan trained in Kalaripayattu.

Gurukkal is mentioned in the Northern Ballads (Vadakkan Pattukal), which say he belonged to the Kaniyar caste who were traditionally astrologers. Despite being an excellent master, Gurukkal was killed by a trainee called Thacholi Othenan in a duel.
