= GVHSS Kadirur =

School in Kerala, India

Location
- Kadirur, Kerala, 670642; India
- 11°47′07.4″N 75°31′52.0″E

Information
- Other name: Government Vocational Higher Secondary School Kadirur
- Type: High school/higher secondary school
- Founded: 1 June 1922; 104 years ago
- School board: State Council of Educational Research and Training, Kerala
- School district: Kannur
- Category: Government
- School number: 14015
- School code: Higher secondary - 13043
- Grades: 5-12
- Gender: Co-Education
- Capacity: 2000+
- Language: English, Malayalam
- Alumni: Sreenivasan
- Website: Gvhss kadirur

GVHSS Kadirur, aka Government Vocational Higher Secondary School Kadirur is a Higher Secondary school in Kadirur, Kerala. Established in 1922 is one of the oldest schools in Kannur under the government of Kerala.

== History ==
The only high school in old Kottayam taluk. In between freedom struggle in the taluk, this school has made history in sports excellence in Malabar while overcoming the freedom struggles. Many students from distant places like Wayanad, Panoor, Pinarayi, Peralassery and Iritty came to Kadirur and stayed; the majority of students travel to school on foot. From 1922 to 1945, this continues. Till starting management high schools in 1945 at Koodali, in 1946 at Kuthuparamba, in 1950 at Pathiriyad, in 1953 at Panoor, in 1955 at Peravoor, in 1956 at Chokli and Iritty, the GVHSS Kadirur was the only center of high school education in those areas. GVHSS Kadirur still has the distinction of being the most traditional government school in Thalassery Thaluk. The role of P. T. Bhaskara Panicker in affiliating with this board school is significant. The regions from where the students in the olden times came to study at the Government Vocational Higher Secondary School Kadirur, now has 66 high schools. It is still popularly known and still emphasizes value-based education.

== Notable alumni ==
- Sreenivasan - actor, screenwriter, film director, film producer.
