= Panoor =

- Municipality
- Location in Kerala, India Panoor (India)
- Coordinates: 11.7518700°N 75.595860°E
- Country: India
- State: Kerala
- District: Kannur
- Taluk: Thalassery
- Municipality: 2015

Government
  - Body: Municipality
  - Chairperson: Naushath Kudathil

Area
  - Total: 28.53 km^{2} (11.02 sq mi)
- Elevation: 27 m (89 ft)

Population (2011)
  - Total: 55,216
  - Density: 1,935/km^{2} (5,013/sq mi)

Languages
  - Official: Malayalam, English
- Time zone: UTC+5:30 (IST)
- PIN: 670692
- Telephone code: 91490
- ISO 3166 code: IN-KL
- Vehicle registration: KL58
- Assembly constituency: Kuthuparamba
- Lok Sabha constituency: Vadakara

Panoor is a municipality in the district of Kannur in the state of Kerala, India. The town is the main marketplace for the farmer communities in the surrounding regions. Panoor was granted municipal status in 2015 when the Government of Kerala merged the Panoor, Peringalam and Kariyad Grama Panchayats to form the Panoor Municipality.

== History ==
The Kolathunadu emerged into independent 10 principalities i.e., Kadathanadu (Vadakara), Randathara or Poyanad (Dharmadom), Kottayam (Thalassery), Nileshwaram, Iruvazhinadu (Panoor), Kurumbranad etc., under separate royal chieftains due to the outcome of internal dissensions. The Nileshwaram dynasty on the northernmost part of Kolathiri dominion, were relatives to both Kolathunadu as well as the Zamorin of Calicut, in the early medieval period. Panoor was under Iruvazhinadu.

== Location ==
Panoor is about 10 km (6.2 mi) south of Kuthuparamba, 11 km (6.8 mi) east of Thalassery and 33 km (21 mi) southeast of district headquarters Kannur.

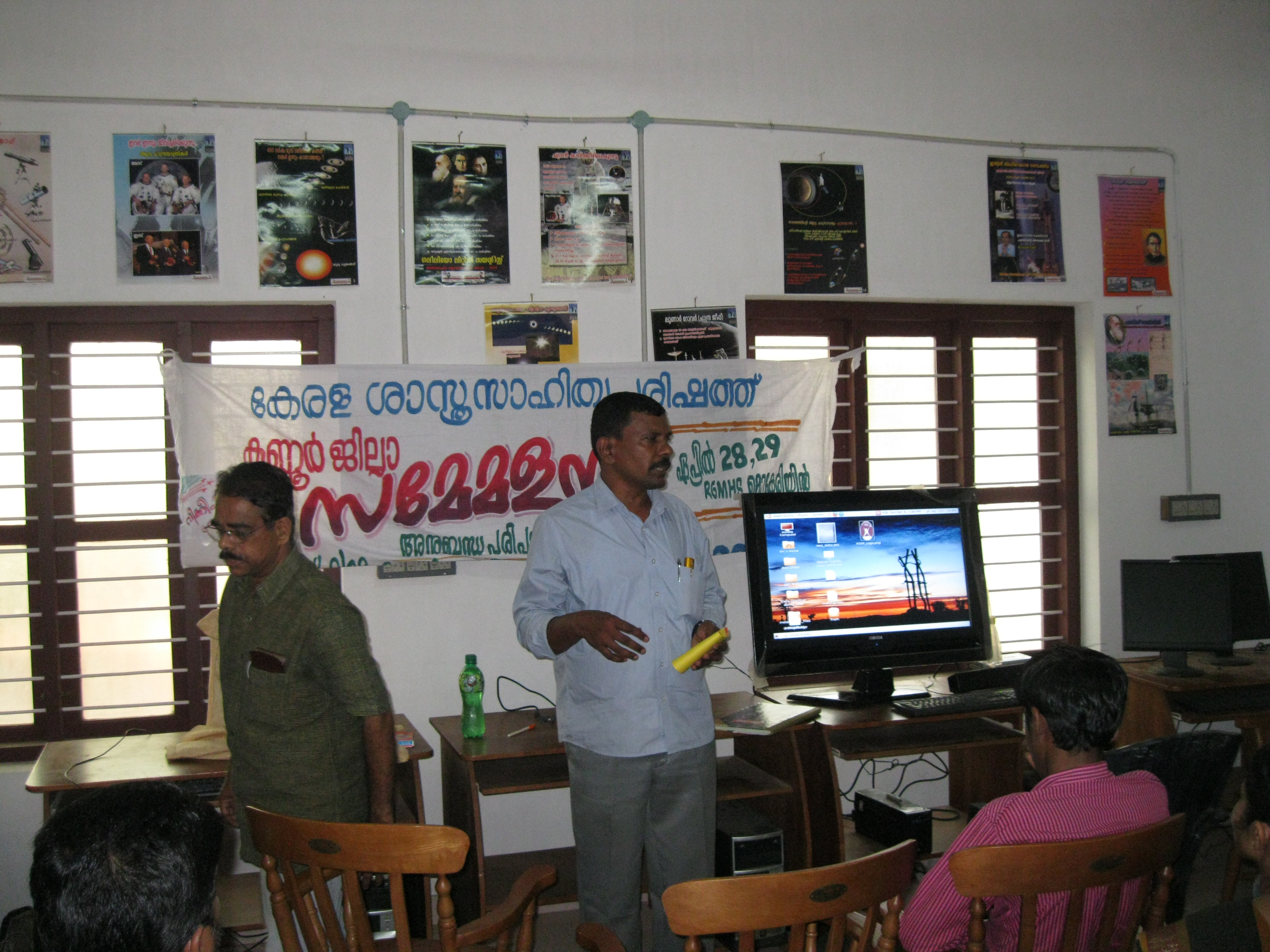
Science and Literature meet at Panoor

== Demographics ==
As of 2011 India census, Panoor has a population of 17,438. Males constitute 46% of the population and females 54%. Panoor has an average literacy rate of 82%, higher than the national average of 59.5%: male literacy is 83%, and female literacy is 81%. In Panoor, 12% of the population is under 6 years of age.

== Civic Administration ==
The town is administered by the Panoor Municipality, headed by a chairman. For administrative purposes, the town is divided into 41 wards, from which the members of the municipal council are elected for five years. The municipality is currently administered by UDF with Naushath Kudathil as the municipal chairperson.

=== Panoor Municipality Election 2025 ===
| S.No. | Party name | Party symbol | Number of Councillors |
|---|---|---|---|
| 01 | UDF | | 23 |
| 02 | LDF | | 14 |
| 03 | NDA | | 03 |
| 04 | Others | | 01 |

== Politics ==
The major political parties in Panoor area are CPIM, IUML, INC and BJP. Panoor municipality is politically a part of Kuthuparamba Assembly constituency which is a part of Vatakara Lok Sabha constituency. Prior to 2008, Panoor was a part of Peringalam Assembly constituency.

=== Political violence ===
This area is an epicenter of political violence between RSS and Communists. Members-led Communist Party of India (Marxist) (CPI(M)) and the Members-led Rashtriya Swayamsevak Sangh (RSS) have been fighting in this area for supremacy for the last 50 years. Clashes in 2008 left seven people killed and many have been injured. The High Court of Kerala called this manslaughter a "compelling sport" and suggested permanent deployment of Central forces in the affected areas.

== Law and Order ==
Panoor police station, set up in 1889, covers panchayats like Mokeri, Panniyannur, parts of Kunnothuparamba panchayat and Panoor municipality. It's part of Panoor circle, established on 06-06-1994 in Kuthuparamba subdivision under Kannur city police.

Panoor has a Grama Nyayalaya or village court situated at Chokli for easy access to the judicial system in the rural areas.

== Transport ==
State Highway 38 passes through Panoor town connects the cities of Kannur (Chovva) and Kozhikode (Puthiyangadi). The roads in Panoor are well laid out, although the condition of the roads is generally affected during the monsoon season. The nearest entry point to the National Highway 66 is Kunhippalli which is 11 km from Panoor. The nearest airport Kannur International Airport is about 20 km away. The nearest railway station is at Thalassery about 11 km from Panoor.

== Educational Institutes ==
- MECF College of Teacher Education, Peringathur
- Mahatma Gandhi Arts and Science College, Chendayad
- PR MEMORIAL HSS, Panoor
- KKV MEMORIAL HSS, Panoor
- NAM MEMORIAL HSS, Peringathur
- Rajeev Gandhi Memorial HSS
- Zahra Public School
- Kannamvelli L.P School

== Famous people ==
- Puthanpurayil Ramunni Kurup - commonly known as P. R. Kurup was an Indian socialist leader and former minister of Kerala state.
- K. Panoor - Indian civil rights activist and writer
- V.P. Sathyan - Indian professional footballer

== See also ==
- Peringathur
- Kariyad
- Mokeri
