= Kadirur =

Kadirur Kathirur
- Census Town
- Location in Kerala, India Kadirur (India)
- Coordinates: 11°46′0″N 75°31′0″E
- Country: India
- State: Kerala
- District: Kannur
- Taluk: Thalassery

Government
  - Body: Kathirur Grama Panchayat

Area
  - Total: 12.3 km^{2} (4.7 sq mi)

Population (2011)
  - Total: 31,087
  - Density: 2,530/km^{2} (6,550/sq mi)

Languages
  - Official: Malayalam, English
- Time zone: UTC+5:30 (IST)
- ISO 3166 code: IN-KL
- Vehicle registration: KL 58
- Website: http://panchayat.lsgkerala.gov.in/kadirurpanchayat/

Kadirur is a census town and Grama Panchayat of Kannur district in the State of Kerala, India. Kadirur is situated on the Thalassery-Coorg road, approximately midway between Thalassery and Kuthuparamba, at a distance of about 7 km from each town.

== Demographics ==
As of 2011 Census, Kadirur had a population of 31,087. Males constitute 44.8% of the population and females 55.2%. Kadirur census town has an area of 12.3 km^{2} (4.7 sq mi) with 6817 families residing in it. Average sex ratio was 1232 higher than state average of 1084. Kadirur had an average literacy rate of 97.7%, higher than the state average of 94%: male literacy stands at 98.5%, and female literacy was 97%. In Kadirur, 9.7% of the population was under 6 years of age.

== Schools in Kadirur ==
- GVHSS Kadirur
- Tharuvanatheru UP school, Kadirur
- Govt VHSS Chundangapoil
- Mappila Govt. UP school, 5th Mile, Kadirur
- Kadirur West LP School, Kadirur
- Kadirur East LP School, Kadirur

== Transportation ==
The National Highway 66 commonly referred to as NH-66 passes through Thalassery town. Goa and Mumbai can be accessed on the northern side and Cochin and Thiruvananthapuram can be accessed on the southern side. The road to the east of Iritty connects to Mysore and Bangalore. The nearest railway station is Thalassery on Mangalore-Palakkad line. Trains are available to almost all parts of India subject to advance booking over the internet. There are airports at Kannur and Calicut. Both of them are international airports but direct flights are available only to Middle Eastern countries. The major road passing through kadirur is the State Highway 30 (SH 30) a.k.a. Thalassery - coorg road.

== Notable people ==
- Kadhirur Gurukkal, martial artist
- P. Jayarajan, politician
