= Peringalam =

- town
- Location in Kerala, India Peringalam (India)
- Coordinates: 11.7507°N 75.5121°E
- Country: India
- State: Kerala
- District: Kannur

Languages
  - Official: Malayalam, English
- Time zone: UTC+5:30 (IST)
- PIN: 670675
- Telephone code: 0490
- ISO 3166 code: IN-KL
- Vehicle registration: KL-58
- Nearest city: Thalassery
- Lok Sabha constituency: Vatakara
- Climate: good (Köppen)

Peringalam is a small town in Talassery taluk of Kannur district in the Indian state of Kerala. It is part of Panoor municipality. Peringalam assembly constituency was part of Vatakara (Lok Sabha constituency) until 2011.
