= K. Panoor =

Indian civil rights activist (1927–2018)

- Born: K. Kunhiraman; 10 January 1927; Panoor, Malabar district, British India
- Died: 20 February 2018 (aged 91); Kannur, Kerala
- Citizenship: India
- Occupations: civil rights activist, writer
- Spouse: Hirabhai
- Children: 4
- Parent(s): Kunjikannan and Muthuvana Kunki Amma
- Writing career
- Genre: tribal study
- Notable awards: Kerala Sahitya Akademi Award for Overall Contributions, UNESCO Award

K. Kunhiraman who writes under the pen name K. Panoor is a civil rights activist, poet and writer from Kerala, India. He has received several noted awards including the UNESCO Award, the Kerala Sahitya Akademi Award for Overall Contributions and Award from the Department of Culture, India government. Panoor's books were used as textbooks in various universities in Kerala. He played a key role in the formation of the Confederation of Human Rights Organizations (CHRO) and was its first chairman.

The story of 1985 Malayalam film Uyarunm Njan Nadake directed by P. Chandrakumar with Mohanlal in the lead was based on the book Keralathile Africa.

== Biography ==
K. Kunhiraman was born on 10 January 1927, to Kunjikannan and Muthuvana Kunki Amma in Panoor in present-days Kannur district.

He started his career as an employee of the Revenue Department in the Kerala Government Service.

Reading Bengali novelist Vibhuti Bhushan Bandopadhyay's Aranyakam marked a turning point in his life. Desiring to find a solution to the plight of the adivasis, he volunteered to serve in the Tribal Welfare Department and became the project director on deputation for the four districts of North Kerala. He wrote the book Keralathile Africa based on his experiences during the deputation period from 1958 to 1963. The book is considered to be the first textbook on tribal people in Kerala. He retired from service as Deputy Collector in 1981. When the Malayala Kalagramam, a center of art and culture, in New Mahe established, he was appointed as its Registrar. He held that position for ten years.

Tribal lives are also the subject of works such as Ha Naxalbari, America in Kerala and Sahyante Makkal.

=== Personal life and death ===
Panoor and his wife Hirabhai have four children. He died on 2018 February 20 at a private hospital in Kannur.

== Controversies ==
Panoor narrated the annoying scenes he saw during his official journey, in his book Keralathile Africa which literally means Africa in Kerala. However, the book did not receive the expected response. The book, which depicts the realities of tribal life, caused a great deal of controversy.

This book was a matter of controversy even in the Kerala Legislative Assembly. The book officially brought out the landlords who enslaved the adivasis to work on their own farms in Wayanad. During the debate on the Land Reforms Act in the Kerala Legislative Assembly in 1964, O. P. Koran MLA raised the issue and as proof, he presented book by Panoor to the niyamasabha speaker. The newspapers made it a point of contention. Arguments arose as to whether the adivasis of Wayanad were slaves or not. It has even been argued that to say that slavery exists is treason. The government's solution to this problem was to confiscate copies of Keralathile Africa under National Security Act and take disciplinary action against the author. The book received UNESCO award at a time when the government was trying to confiscate the book and take disciplinary action against Panoor.

His second book, Malakal, Thazvarakal, Manushyar (meaning: Mountains, Valley, and Humans), was also controversial.

== Selected works ==
- Keralathile Africa
- Keralathile America
- Ha Naxalbari
- Malakal, Thazvarakal, Manushyar
- Sahyante Makkal
- Ente Hrudayathile Adivasikal

== Awards and honors ==
- UNESCO Award
- Kerala Sahitya Akademi Award for Overall Contributions, 2006
- Award from Department of Culture, India government
- Ramasramam Award
