= Kanavu (school) =

Information
- School type: Alternative school
- Founder: K. J. Baby

Kanavu is an alternative school/commune in Cheengode in Nadavayal village, Wayanad district, Kerala, India, set up by writer, activist and film director K. J. Baby. The school's activities include performances of traditional plays and music, as well as martial arts (Kalarippayattu) training. During the year 2007 the Kanavu was registered with the students of kanavu as a trust, and they have taken over the charges.

== See also ==
Palayathu Vayal Govt. UP School
