= P. R. Kurup =

Indian politician

Puthanpurayil Ramunni Kurup

Minister for Irrigation and Co-operation
- In office 6 March 1967 – 10 October 1969
- Preceded by: R. Sankar
- Succeeded by: O. Koran
- Constituency: Peringalam

Minister for Forests and Transport
- In office 20 May 1996 – 11 January 1999
- Constituency: Peringalam

Personal details
- Born: 30 September 1915
- Died: 17 January 2001 (aged 85)
- Spouse: K.P. Leelavathi (Late)

Puthanpurayil Ramunni Kurup (30 September 1915 – 17 January 2001) was an Indian socialist leader and former minister of Kerala state. Born as the son of Govindan Nambiar and Kunjunjamma at Puthur near Panoor in present-day Kerala state, he was initiated into politics through Indian National Congress in 1935. He got attracted to the ideals of the socialist faction later and worked closely with various socialist parties such as Praja Socialist Party, Samyukta Socialist Party, Janata Party and Janata Dal. In 1967, he became cooperative, irrigation, and Devaswam minister in the EMS ministry. In 1996, he became minister for forests and transport in the E. K. Nayanar ministry. He resigned on 11 January 1999 after age-related ailments. He died on 17 January 2001. He was married to (late) K. P. Leelavathi and had four sons and four daughters, including former Kerala state agricultural minister K. P. Mohanan.

== Positions held ==
- Minister for Irrigation and Co-operation in the E. M. S. Namboodiripad ministry from 6 March 1967 to 21 October 1969
- Minister for Forests and Transport in the E. K. Nayanar ministry from 20 May 1996 to 11 January 1999
- Chairman of the Committee on Private Members Bills and Resolutions (1957 - 1958)
- Chairman of House Committee (1987 - 1989)
- State General Secretary, Janata Dal
- President of Malabar Kisan Panchayat

== Elections ==
- Elected to 1st and 2nd Kerala Legislative Assembly from Koothuparamba constituency as Praja Socialist Party (PSP) candidate
- Elected to 3rd, 5th, 8th and 10th Kerala Legislative Assemblies from Peringalam constituency as Samyukta Socialist Party (SSP), Indian National Congress, Janata Party and Janata Dal candidate respectively.

== Literary works ==
He had written a drama, Purushartham, which lambasted feudal systems. He was the editor of Puthuyugam a magazine, and Padayani, a newspaper. He also penned an autobiography, Ente Naadinte Katha, Enteyum.
