= Chokli =

Chokli Chockli
- Census Town
- Location in Kerala, India Chokli (India)
- Coordinates: 11.7308°N 75.5566°E
- Country: India
- State: Kerala
- District: Kannur
- Taluk: Thalassery

Government
  - Type: Grama Panchayat
  - Body: Chokli Grama Panchayat

Area
  - Total: 14.24 km^{2} (5.50 sq mi)
- Elevation: 27 m (89 ft)

Population (2011)
  - Total: 33,732
  - Density: 2,369/km^{2} (6,135/sq mi)

Languages
  - Official: Malayalam, English
- Time zone: UTC+5:30 (IST)
- PIN: 670672
- Telephone code: 91490
- ISO 3166 code: IN-KL
- Vehicle registration: KL-58
- Assembly constituency: Thalassery
- Lok Sabha constituency: Vatakara

Chokli is a census town and grama panchayat in Kannur district of Kerala state, India.

== Location ==
Chokli is located 30 km (19 mi) south of district headquarters Kannur, 8 km (5.0 mi) south east of Thalassery, 4 km (2.5 mi) east of New Mahe, 4 km (2.5 mi) south west of Panoor and 14 km (8.7 mi) north west of Nadapuram on Thalassery - Nadapuram route.

== Demographics ==
As of 2011 India census, Chockli had a population of 33,732 comprising 15,055 males and 18,677 females. There were over 7052 houses in the town jurisdiction limits. In Chokli, 11.23% of the population was under 6 years. The sex ratio was 1241 against state average of 1084 and child sex ratio was 1012 compared to state average of 964. The average literacy rate was 97.48% higher than state average of 94%. The male literacy stands at 98.27% female literacy at 96.86%.

== Administration ==
The town is administered by Chokli panchayat which consists of 19 wards. Chokli is politically a part of Kuthuparamba Assembly constituency under Vatakara Lok Sabha constituency.

=== Ward list ===
Chokli Panchayat comprises following 19 wards.

1. Nitumbram
2. Nitumbram vayalil peedika
3. Registrar office
4. Marankandy
5. Andipeedika
6. Kurunthalipeedika
7. Kuttiyilpeedika
8. Mekkunnu
9. Kanhirathinkeezhil
10. Mathipparambu
11. Narayanan parambu
12. Olavilam
13. Mekkaraveettil thazhe
14. Thuluvarkunnu
15. Kaviyoor east
16. Kaviyoor
17. Chokli town
18. Gramathi
19. Nidumbram illathu peedika

== Law and Order ==
Chokli police station was opened in 01–11–1955. At western side, Pallur police station and at south Panur police stations are sharing boundaries with Chokli police station. The jurisdiction of the police station is Chokli grama panchayat and a major portion of Panoor municipality. Chokli station is included in Panoor circle of Kuthuparamba subdivision under Kannur city police.

Panoor village court is situated at Chokli for easy access to the judicial system in the rural areas.

== Transportation ==
Three main roads pass through Chokli town are Thalassery - Nadapuram road, Chokli - Panoor road and Mahe - Chokli road. The nearest entry point to NH 66 is Peringadi of about 3 km south of Chokli on Thalassery Mahe Bypass. Mumbai and Goa can be accessed from northern side and Kochi, Thiruvananthapuram towards southern side. Nearest railway stations are Mahe and Thalassery which are at a distance of 8 km and 7 km respectively. The nearest airport is at Kannur of about 31 km north of Chokli.

== Famous people ==
- Pradeep Chokli - Malayalam film director
