= Rajeev Gandhi Memorial Higher Secondary School =

School in Mokeri, Kannur, Kerala, India

Location
- Mokeri, Panoor, Kerala, 670692; India; 11°47′04.6″N 75°34′29.7″E

Information
- Other names: Rajeev Gandhi Memorial Higher Secondary School / Rajeev Gandhi Memorial HSS
- School type: High school/higher secondary school
- Established: 26 June 1995; 31 years ago
- School district: Kannur
- Category: Government-aided
- School number: Higher secondary - 13146
- School code: 14028
- Principal: A. K. Premadasan
- Headmaster: C. P. Sudheendran
- Staff: 115+
- Teaching staff: 110+
- Grades: 8-12
- Gender: co-education
- Capacity: 3700+
- Language: Malayalam, English
- Classrooms: 84
- Campus size: 3.5 acres (1.4 ha)
- Affiliation: Kerala State Education Board (SCERT, DHSE)
- Website: rgmhss.com

RGMHSS aka Rajeev Gandhi Memorial Higher Secondary School is a Higher Secondary School in Mokeri, Kerala. Established in 1995, it is a prominent government-aided school in Kannur district.

== History ==
The school was established by the Vallyayi Educational Society on 26 June 1995. The school is affiliated with the State Council of Educational Research and Training, Kerala. It is located in Mokeri, Panoor in the Kannur district of Kerala. The school have grades starting from 8th standard to 12th standard. The school is ranked as one of the most well-established schools in Kerala with a good academic record.

The school has a library for further reading for the students and has 5000 books in its library. While starting the school in 1995 the school consists of only 55 students in 2 divisions. Later it increased considerably and now the school have 84 classrooms with 3900 students and more than 100 teachers included in High school and Higher secondary department.

== Academics ==
The school is located at Mokeri, a part of Panoor block, in the educational district of Thalassery. This school has had the highest number of students appear for the SSLC examination in the Kannur district with more than 1000 students every year. Also the school has been selected as the recipient of the award best 'Haritha Vidyalayam' in the state of Kerala. The school has been known for its excellence of extracurricular activities in the State School Science Fair (Sasthrolsavam) and Kerala School Kalolsavam.
