= P. K. Praveen =

Indian politician (born 1970)

Member of the Kerala Legislative Assembly
- Incumbent
- Assumed office May 2026
- Constituency: Kuthuparamba

Personal details
- Born: 1970 (age 55–56)
- Party: Rashtriya Janata Dal
- Parent: K. P. Divakaran (father)
- Education: Post Graduate
- Occupation: Businessman

P. K. Praveen (born 1970) is an Indian politician from the Rashtriya Janata Dal (RJD), currently serving as the MLA for Kuthuparamba.

== Personal life ==
P. K. Praveen is the son of K. P. Divakaran. He completed his post-graduation and has been active in business and local social welfare activities in Kannur district.

== Political career ==
In a historic turn for the RJD in Kerala, Praveen won the Kuthuparamba seat as an LDF candidate in 2026. He defeated the IUML candidate in one of the closest contests in the state, securing the first assembly representation for his party in Kerala. His victory was celebrated as a significant breakthrough for the RJD's expansion into South India.

== Election results ==
2026 Kerala Legislative Assembly election: Kuthuparamba
Party	Candidate	Votes	%
RJD	P. K. Praveen	70,448	43.03
IUML	Jayanthi Rajan	69,162	42.25
BJP	Adv. Shijilal	22,195	13.56
