= Palayathu Vayal Government Upper Primary School =

School in Kerala, India

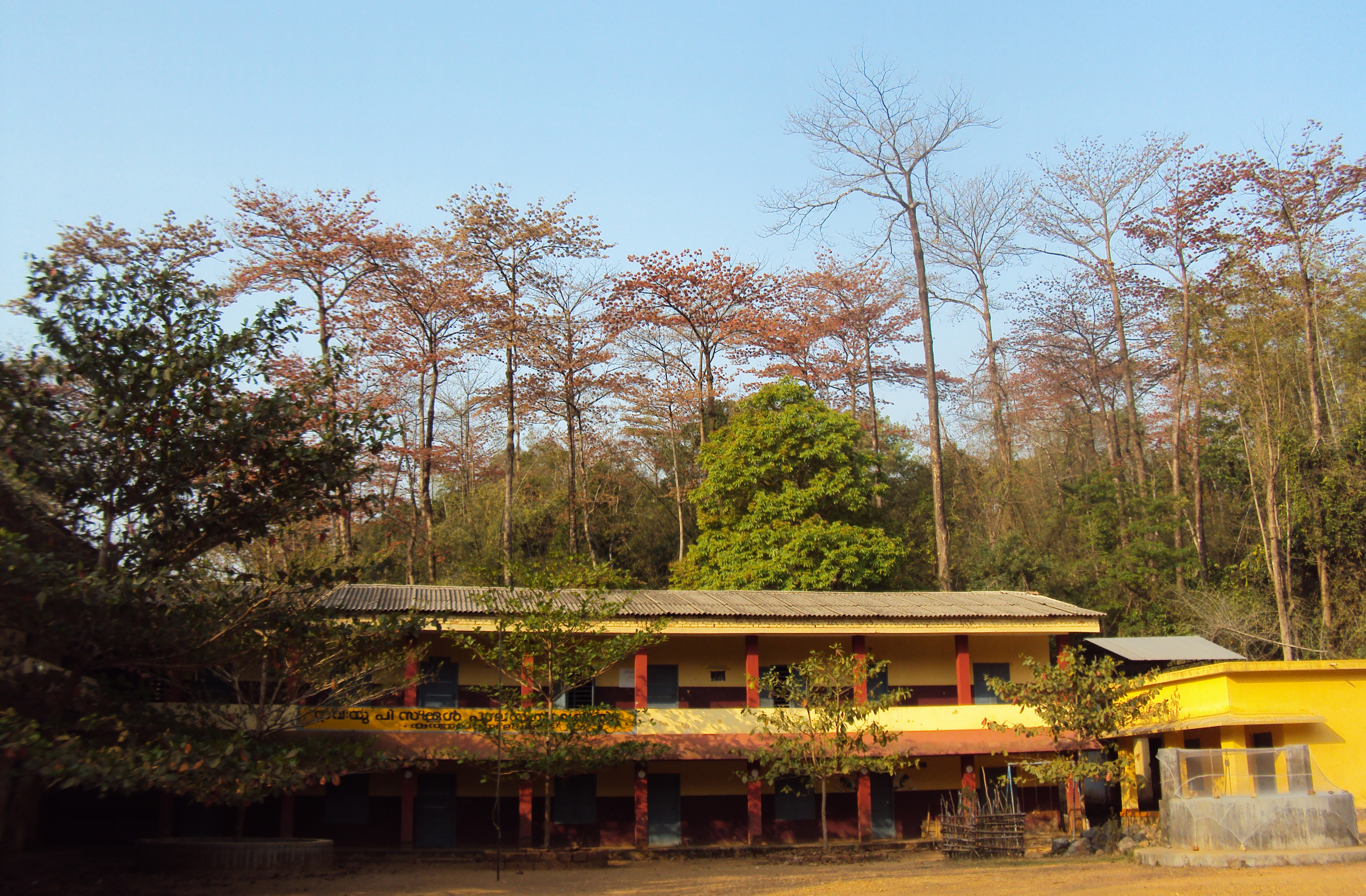
Palayathu Vayal Govt. UP School

Palayathu Vayal Government Upper Primary School, Kolayad is an educational institution situated within the deep tropical forests of Kolayad Panchayat, Kannur district of North Kerala, India.

Of the 172 students enrolled there, most belong to the families of an ancient local tribe Kurichya. The school is situated in a region with no effective communication or transport facilities. Despite this, it has a post office, a TV news studio, a mathematics lab and a museum all formed and operated by the students.

== Location ==
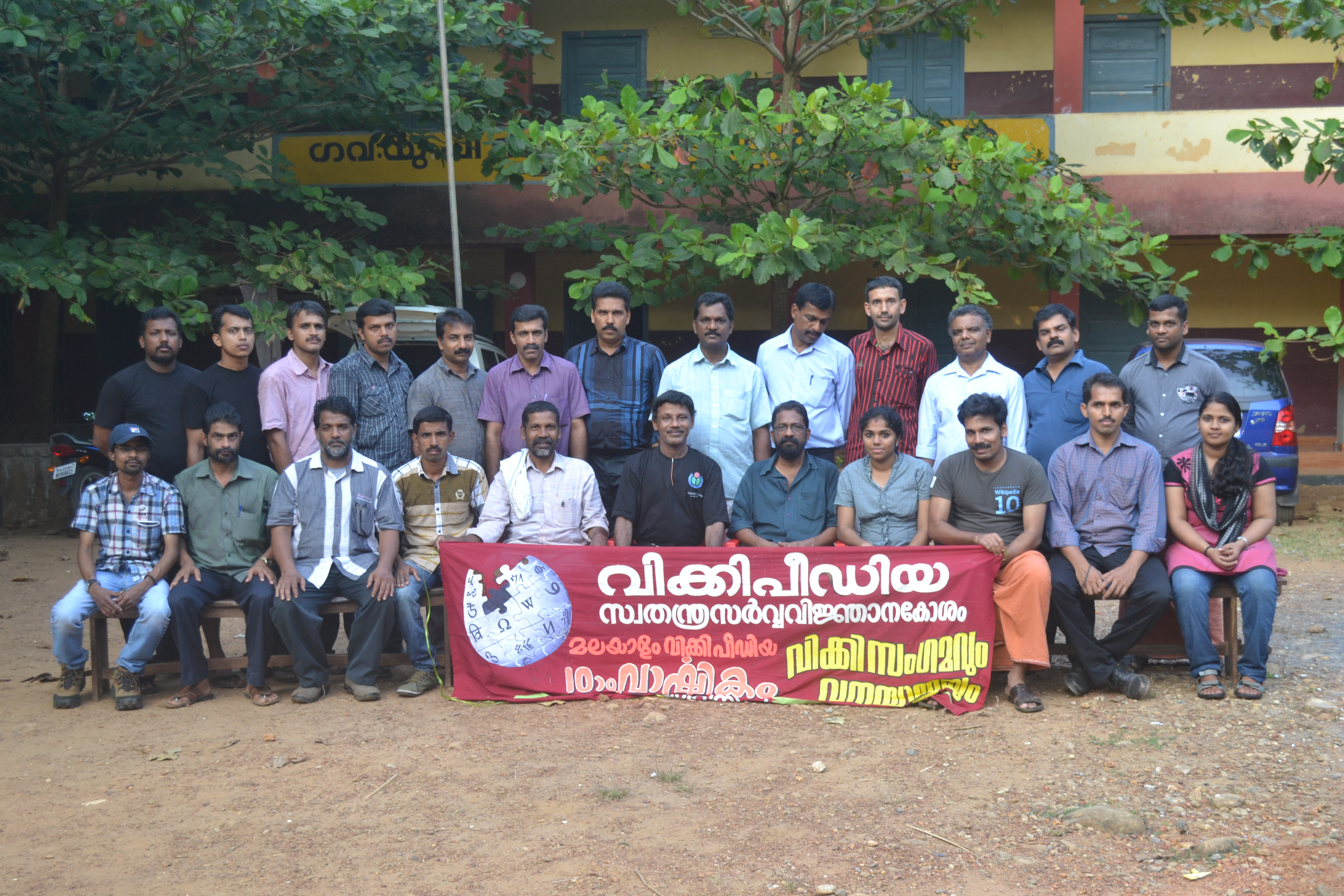
A team participating in a two-day knowledge interaction session hosted by the school with the local Wikipedians, forest ecologists and experts from other fields in December 2012

The school is located in the Kannavam-Peruva strip of reserved forests in Kolayad Panchayat, Kannur district. Accessibility to the site is very primitive. The only public transport available, a bus by state road transport corporation that runs once in a day, is from the nearest village of Kolayad. There are no mobile or land telephone networks. Electricity is available.

Kolayad can be accessed from the nearby towns Peravoor, Kuthuparamba & Iritty. From the main highway, the school is connected by road through protected forest. The forest entry point is known as Changala Gate (Chain Gate).11°50′35.17″N 75°41′4.88″E. To ensure conservation of natural resources, access is often controlled by the department of forests, Kerala Government.

Palayathu Vayal is a name derived from the days of Pazhassi Kerala Varma, a king who raised a revolt against the English rulers for the first time in the history of Indian freedom struggle. It is believed that Thalakkal Chanthu, the Commander of Kurichya army, the principal force of the King used to train his men at this place. The name Palayam (meaning military camp in Malayalm) was later transformed to Palayathu Vayal.

== Notability ==
Today, the population of Kurichyas, an anthropologically important tribe, is one among the extinction-threatened community of South Asia. Even while struggling to comply with the mainstream civilization and population of India, they strive to preserve their own culture and customs. This school particularly is one such institution where the students are encouraged to upkeep their ancient and indigenous skills and practices. The school is run by the state government.

In a remote location, the scarcity of infrastructure and facilities themselves have prompted the school to start up facilities mimicking their real world counterparts in more affluent societies. Among these are a post office, a television facility for program creation and distribution, and a museum with their exhibits mostly of instruments and artworks of their own ancient styles and an organic farm.

=== Post office ===
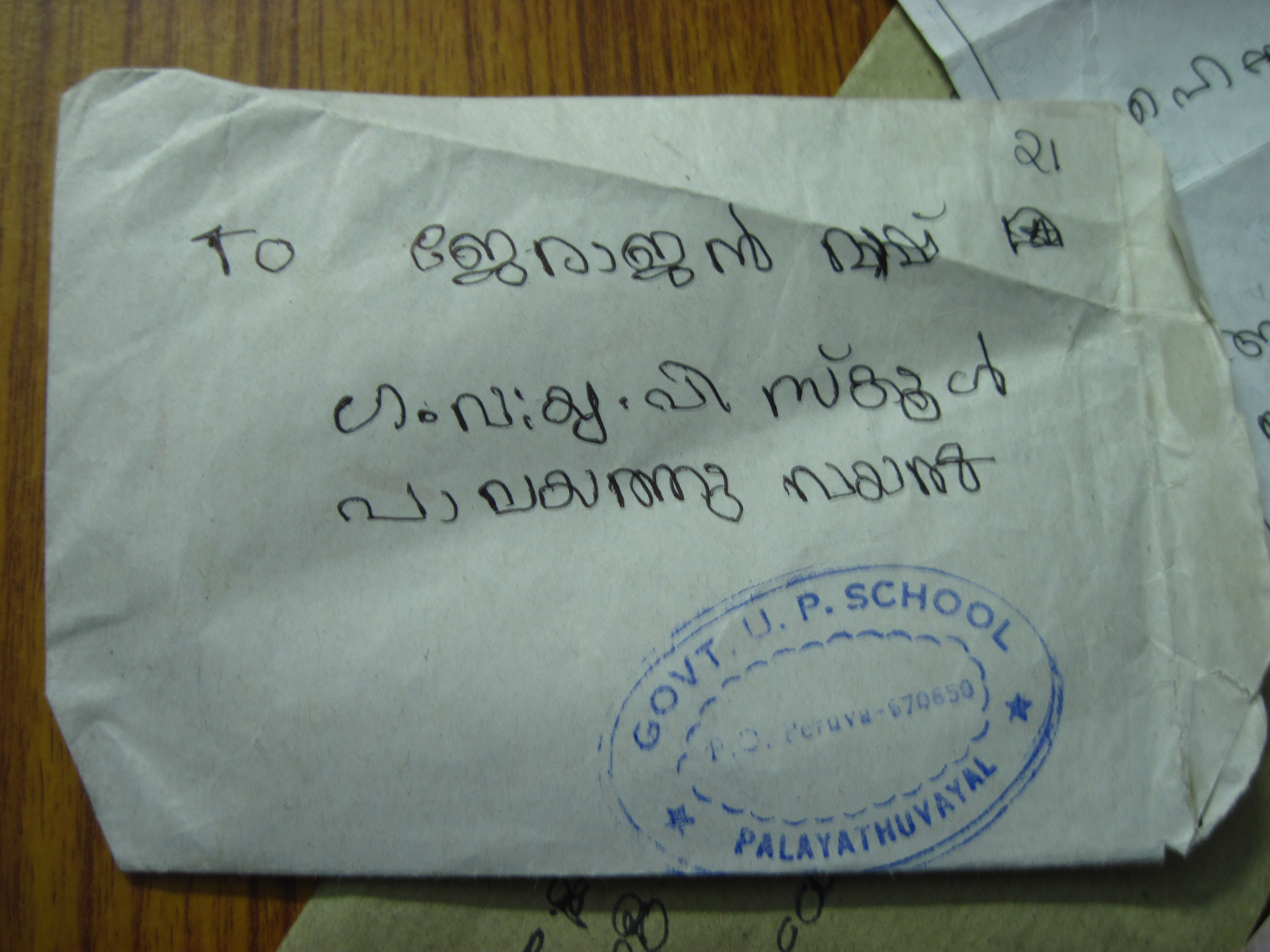
A letter written by the students to their headmaster - The envelope is posted and delivered through the 'Post office' to the addressee. The whole process is administered by students.

The school has devised a postal network run by its students. The children prepare envelopes, write letters to their teachers, friends and classmates and post them in post boxes. 'Postmen' pick them up to the post office where a Postmaster sorts them out and delivers to the addressee. Each letter carries a stamp like the conventional standard.

Students use the facility to submit comments to the teachers. Teachers reply as well as taking necessary redressal actions. The system helps them to improve their writing and creative skills.

=== Television news studio and channel ===
The students run a television news network, gathering video events by means of a video camera. The events could be their own activities, programs conducted in the school, scenes from their surroundings, local news head lines, information snippets and weekly puzzles. The sequences are edited with the help of teachers. The final release is played through television sets in class rooms. There is a daily program on world news.

=== Museum ===
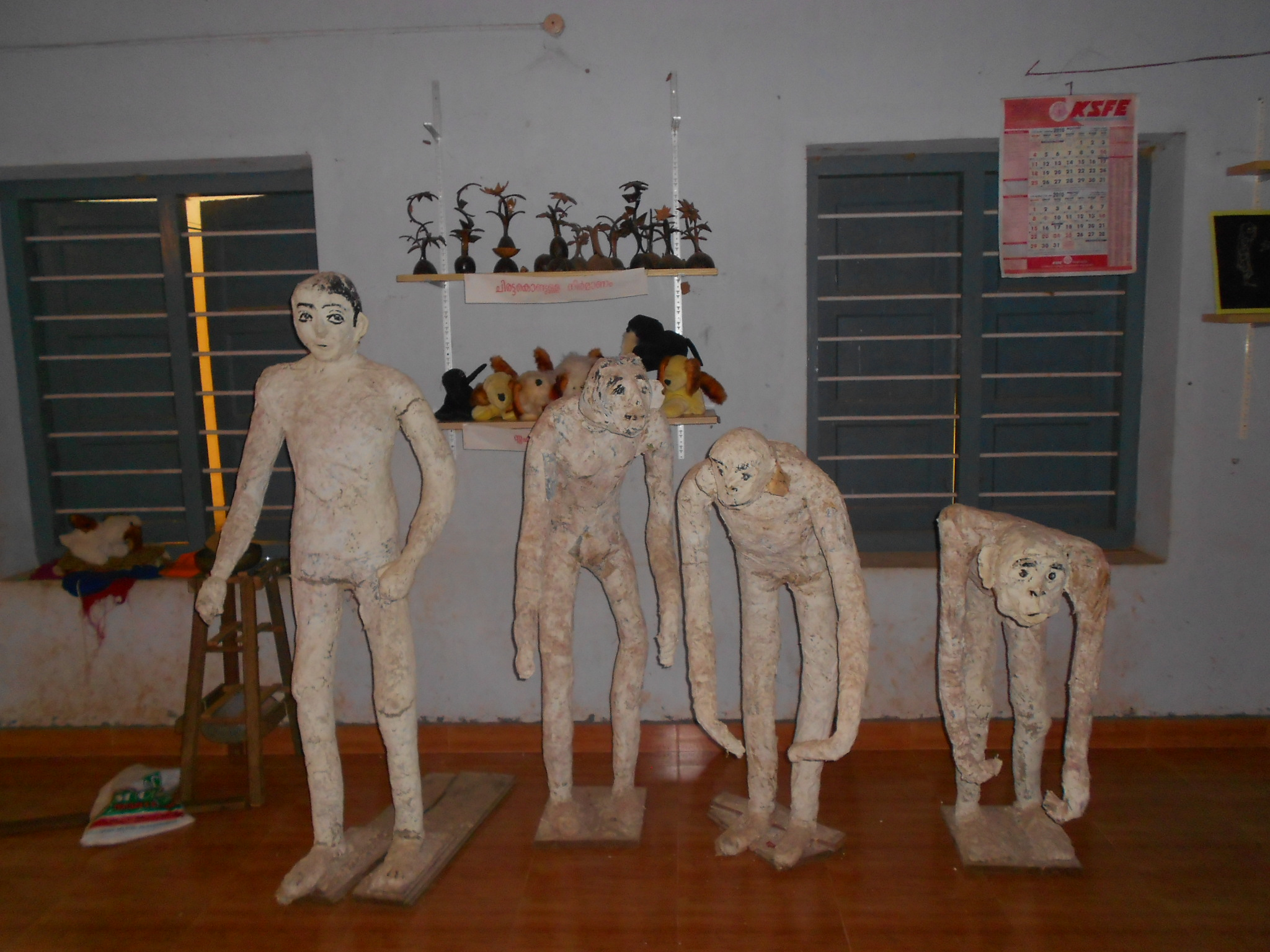
A model depicting human evolution - crafted out of recycled paper pulp by students

The school has a small museum. The exhibits are traditional tools, weapons and instruments used by Kurichya, handicrafts by students, models for science study, and items collected from local forests.

=== Math Lab ===
Math lab is a project where the teachers and students create gadgets and models to help the study of mathematics. The articles include abacuses, slide rules, and place value cards.

=== Four Plant farms ===
In order to train the children in farming activities, the school promotes a 'Four Plant farming scheme'. Selected four plants (such as Moringa oleifera, papaya, local spinach etc.) are cultivated at a nursery at the school as well as at the students' houses. The project also aims at complementing the nutrition of these students.

== Biodiversity studies ==
In 2012, a team of biologists and historians in co-operation with the Wikimedia India Chapter and several Wikipedians from the local language community, chose the school and its surroundings for an expedition to explore the bio-diversity system in the area.

== See also ==
- Kanavu
