= Kunnothuparamba =

- village
- Location in Kerala, India Kunnothuparamba (India)
- Coordinates: 11.7644°N 75.6191°E
- Country: India
- State: Kerala
- District: Kannur
- Taluk: Thalassery

Government
  - Type: Panchayati raj (India)
  - Body: Kunnothuparamba Grama Panchayat

Area
  - Total: 29.77 km^{2} (11.49 sq mi)

Population (2011)
  - Total: 39,392
  - Density: 1,323/km^{2} (3,427/sq mi)

Languages
  - Official: Malayalam, English
- Time zone: UTC+5:30 (IST)
- PIN: 670693
- ISO 3166 code: IN-KL
- Vehicle registration: KL 58

Kunnothuparamba is a Grama Panchayat in Kannur district of Kerala state, India that has administration over Kolavelloor census town and Puthoor village.

== Demographics ==
As of the 2011 India census, Kunnothuparamba Grama Panchayat had population of 39,392, among which 19,575 people resided in rural areas and 19,817 in urban areas, of whom 46.1% were male and 53.9% were female. There were 8,596 families, with 4,224 living in rural areas and 4,372 in urban areas. 12% of its population was under 6 years of age. It had average literacy rate of 94.8%, higher than the state average of 94%.
