= Pattiom =

Pattiam
- Census Town
- Location in Kerala, India Pattiam (India)
- Coordinates: 11.8055500°N 75.5684400°E
- Country: India
- State: Kerala
- District: Kannur

Area
  - Total: 12.67 km^{2} (4.89 sq mi)

Population (2011)
  - Total: 20,161
  - Density: 1,591/km^{2} (4,121/sq mi)

Languages
  - Official: Malayalam, English
- Time zone: UTC+5:30 (IST)
- ISO 3166 code: IN-KL
- Vehicle registration: KL 58

Pattiam is a census town in Kannur district in the Indian state of Kerala.. It is also the hometown of late Malayalam actor /filmmaker Sreenivasan.

== Demographics ==
As of 2011 Census, Pattiam had a population of 20,161. Males constitute 45.7% of the population and females 54.3%. Pattiam census town has an area of 12.67 km^{2} (4.89 sq mi) with 4,661 families residing in it. The average sex ratio was 1190, higher than the state average of 1084. Pattiam had an average literacy rate of 96.7%, higher than the state average of 94%: male literacy was 98%, and female literacy was 95.7%. In Pattiom, 9.6% of the population was under the age of six.

== Transportation ==
The national highway passes through Thalassery town. Mangalore, Goa and Mumbai can be accessed on the northern side and Cochin and Thiruvananthapuram can be accessed on the southern side. The road to the east of Iritty connects to Mysore and Bangalore. The nearest railway station is Thalassery on Mangalore-Palakkad line. Trains are available to almost all parts of India subject to advance booking over the internet. There are airports at Kannur, Mangalore and Calicut. Both of them are international airports but direct flights are available only to Middle Eastern countries.
