= Kariyad =

Settlement in Kerala, India

Coordinates: 11°41′N 75°35′E

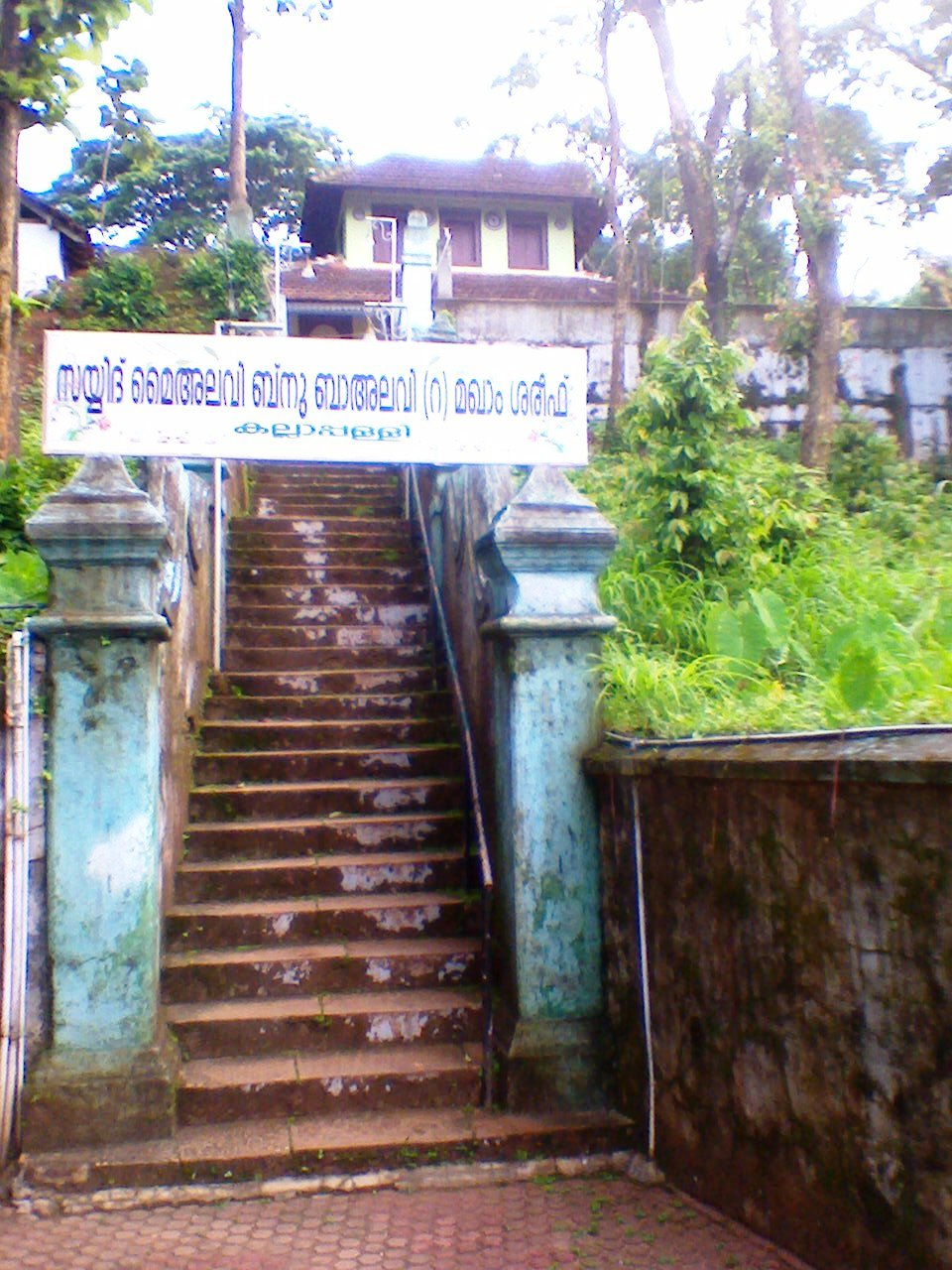
Kallappally Dargah

Kariyad is a small village in Talassery taluk of Kannur district in the Indian state of Kerala.

== Transportation ==
The national highway passes through Thalassery town. Goa and Mumbai can be accessed on the northern side and Cochin, Thiruvananthapuram can be accessed on the southern side. The road to the east of Iritty connects to Mysore and Bangalore. The nearest railway station is Thalassery on Mangalore-Palakkad line. Trains are available to almost all parts of India subject to advance booking over the internet. There are airports at Mangalore and Calicut. Both of them are international airports but direct flights are available only to Middle Eastern countries. New Airport in Kannur can make a significant change the travelling time when compared to the Kozhikode and Manglore. Vadakara, Mahe and Thalassery are the nearby towns of Kariyad, There are frequent Bus going to all these destinations. Two bridges are in kariyad which separate the Kozhikode and Kannur district, one Monthal Bridge and another one kajhira kadavu bridge
