= Mokeri =

- Census town
- Location in Kerala, India Mokeri (India)
- Coordinates: 11.74325°N 75.61781°E
- Country: India
- State: Kerala
- District: Kannur

Government
  - Type: Panchayati raj (India)
  - Body: Mokeri Grama Panchayat

Area
  - Total: 10.53 km^{2} (4.07 sq mi)

Population (2011)
  - Total: 19,684
  - Density: 1,869/km^{2} (4,842/sq mi)

Languages
  - Official: Malayalam, English
- Time zone: UTC+5:30 (IST)
- PIN: 670671,670691,670692
- ISO 3166 code: IN-KL
- Website: http://panchayat.lsgkerala.gov.in/mokeripanchayat/

Mokeri is a census town in Mokeri panchayat of Kannur district in the Indian state of Kerala.

== Demographics ==
As of 2011 Census, Mokeri had population of 19,684 which constitutes 9,039 (45.9%) males and 10,645 (54.1%) females. Mokeri census town has an area of 10.53 km^{2} (4.07 sq mi) with 4,292 families residing in it. Average sex ratio was 1178 higher than state average of 1084. In Mokeri, 11% of the population was under 6 years age. Mokeri had average literacy of 95.9% higher than state average of 94%; male literacy stands at 97.7% and female literacy was 94.5%.

== Educational institutions ==
Rajeev Gandhi Memorial Higher Secondary School

== Transportation ==
The national highway passes through Thalassery town. Goa and Mumbai can be accessed on the northern side and Cochin and Thiruvananthapuram can be accessed on the southern side. The road to the east of Iritty connects to Mysore and Bangalore. The nearest railway station is Thalassery on Mangalore-Palakkad line. its 10 km away. Trains are available to almost all parts of India subject to advance booking over the internet. There are airports at kannur international airportMangalore and Calicut. 3 are international airports but direct flights are available only to Middle Eastern countries.
