= Vishnupant Moreshwar Chatre =

Vishnupant Moreshwar Chatre (1840-1905) was an Indian circus owner who is considered the founder of the modern Indian circus. His circus company Great Indian Circus was the first circus company in India. Chatre met martial arts trainer Keeleri Kunhikannan when Great Indian Circus toured Thalassery, Kerala in 1887. During the visit Kunjikannan and Chatre signed an agreement, according to which Kunjikannan agreed to train trainees for the circus and Chatre agreed to employ them. This led to the development of the first circus academy in the country.

== Personal life ==
He was born in a small village called Ankalkhop in Sangli, Maharashtra. His father, Moreshwar Chatre, was the treasurer at the palace of Jamkhandi. Since childhood Chatre loved birds and animals.

At the urging of his father, Chatre got married at the age of sixteen. After marriage he got job at stable of Ramdurg Palace. Later, he gone to Gwalior, Madhya Pradesh. There he got a job at the palace stable. At Gwalior, Baba Sahib Apthe, a horse trainer, taught him horse characters, horse training methods etc. At Gwalior, under Ustad Hadhu Khan, he also studied Hindustani classical music.

After leaving Gwalior he became in charge of the stables of Balasahib Patwardhan, the king of the Kurundwad princely state of Sangli. Balasahib also helped Chatre to form his circus company. He trained his second wife Avuda Bai Parulelkar in single trapeze, acrobatics and animal training.

In 1890, after handing over circus charges to his brother, Chatre settled in Indore with his classical music master Ustad Rahmat Khan. He was an acute diabetic patient. He died on February 20, 1905, at Indore.

== Birth of Indian circus ==
In 1879, the Royal Italian Circus by Giuseppe Chiarini toured India. Before all his shows started, he would tell the audience that India did not have a proper circus and would have to wait many more years to develop one. In addition, he offered "a thousand British Indian rupees" and a horse as a gift to anyone who could repeat his daring stage effects within six months.

Accepting the challenge, on March 20, 1880, Chatre came to perform his circus at the Kurundwad Palace Grounds, but Chiarini did not come to see it. After this Vishnupant Chatre bought most of the circus equipment from Chiarini. Within a year, he formed a new circus company called the Great Indian Circus. This was the first circus company in India. Chatre's Great Indian Circus toured various parts of India and other countries. He eventually merged his circus company with his cousin's company to form a company called the Karlaker Grand Circus. The Karlaker Grand Circus lasted until 1935.

== Awards and honours ==
Bombay University honoured him giving the title "Professor".
