= History of Indian circus =

Although street performances similar to circuses have existed in India since ancient times, a circus similar to the one described by Philip Astley, known as the father of the modern circus, as described in 1770, only existed in India in the 1880s.

== Birth of modern Indian circus ==
In 1879, the Royal Italian Circus by Giuseppe Chiarini toured India. Before all his shows started, he would tell the audience that India did not have a proper circus and would have to wait many more years to develop one. In addition, he offered "a thousand British Indian rupees and a horse" as a gift to anyone who could repeat his daring stage effects within six months.

When Chiraini's show was going on in Bombay, Balasahib Patwardhan, the king of the Kurundwad princely state of Sangli (today’s Kolhapur) also came to see it. Balasahib was accompanied by Vishnupant Chhatre, the keeper of his stable and riding master at the stables. Chhatre also had some experience with teaching horses. Accepting the challenge, Chhatre announced that he would perform the same in Kurundwad within three months. Failing that, he promised Chiarini that he would return "ten thousand British Indian rupees and the top ten horses." On March 20, 1880, Chhatre came to perform his circus at the Kurundwad Palace Grounds, but Chiarini, worried about not having the money to go back after his performance in Kolkata, did not come to see it.

Vishnupant Chhatre bought most of the circus equipment from Chiarini. Within a year, he formed the first circus company in India, the Great Indian Circus. Chhatre's Great Indian Circus toured locally in India (including the same venue where the Chiarini's performance was held in Bombay) and internationally in locales such as Sri Lanka, Singapore, Kuala Lumpur, Jakarta and Japan. He eventually merged his circus company with his cousin's to form a new company called the Karlekar Grand Circus. The Karlekar Grand Circus lasted until 1935.

== Pre-independence period ==
Inspired by Chiarini's circus at Kolkata, in 1887 Priyanath Bose from Bengal founded the Great Bengal Circus and toured Bengal, India and South East Asia.

The first circus company in Kerala State, Malabar Grand Circus, was inaugurated at Chirakkara on February 2, 1904 under the leadership of Pariyali Kannan, a student of Keeleri Kunjikannan. The company only operated for two years.

Great Royal Circus is claimed to have started in 1909. Its previous name was Madhuskar's Circus. Later, animal trainer Narayan Rao Walawalker took over the circus and renamed it to The Great Royal.

In the year 1920, Baburao Kadam founded the Grand Bombay Circus. In 1922, Keeleri's nephew K.M.Kunhikannan started the Whiteway Circus. He later founded Hind Lion circus as well. In 1947, these three circuses were merged to form Great Bombay Circus.

In 1924, another student of Keeleri, Kallan Gopalan, started the Great Rayman Circus.

Vijaya Circus was owned by R. V. Mamoo of Akola, Maharashtra and had only a two-pole tent, two lions, one elephant, and the other essential equipment. Mamoo sold it to M. V. Shankaran in 1951 for Rs. 5000. Shankaran renamed this circus to Gemini Circus. (See: Champad, Sreedharan. 2013. An Album of Indian Big Tops (History of Indian Circus), Houston: Strategic Book Publishing and Rights Co., p. 64 and 66).

== History of circus academy in India ==
In 1888, Chatre's Great Indian Circus toured Thalassery, Kannur, Kerala. It was in Thalassery that Chatre met Kalaripayattu (a type of traditional marshal art) and gymnastic trainer Keeleri Kunhikannan. An agreement was signed between Keeleri Kunhikannan and Chatre, according to that Keeleri Kunhikannan agreed to train the trainees for the circus and Chatre agreed to employ them. For this, Keeleri started a new circus school at Chirappuram near Thalassery, Kannur. The name of his institute was All India Circus Training Hall. In 1901, the Government of Kerala started a Circus Academy in Thalassery, Kannur. It was the first government circus academy in the country.

After Kunhikannan’s death in 1939, one of his student M. K. Raman started Keeleri Kunhikannan Teacher Memorial Circus & Gymnastic Training Centre in Chirakkara.

== See also ==
- Sreedharan Champad, author of An Album of Indian Big Tops: (History of Indian Circus)
- Gemini Shankaran,was an Indian circus owner, businessperson and one of the pioneers of the circus industry in India. Sankaran was a recipient of the Lifetime Achievement Award from the Government of India.
