= Culture of Thalassery =

The British had considerable impact on the culture of Thalassery, a city in northern Kerala, India. As an ancient trade center, the trading and business relations that existed with the Europeans and the Arabs brought people and ideas from many other lands to Thalassery. The Christian missionaries and the educational reforms they brought, played an important role in transforming society. The migration to Travancore during Hyder Ali and Tipu Sultan's invasion was another factor, resulting in less social distance between upper and lower castes from the 18th to mid-20th centuries. This effect did not reach the Travancore-Cochin area, which was not under the Madras Presidency, and where inequality was greater in number.

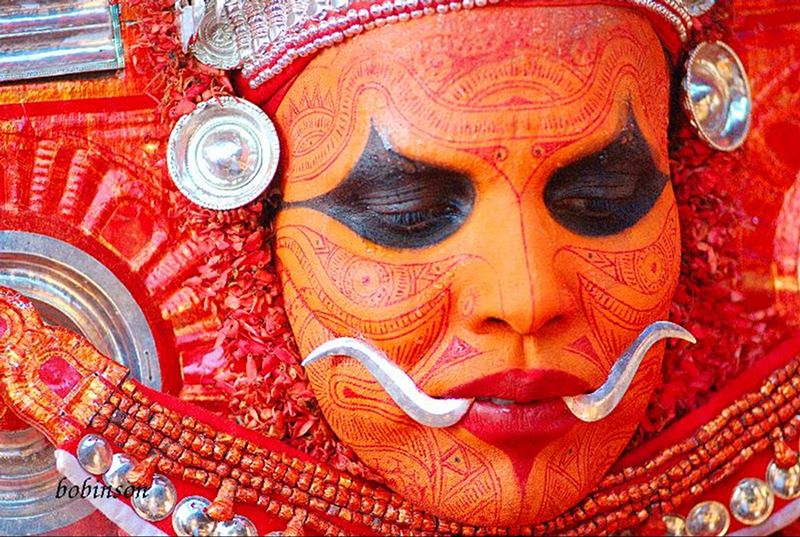
"Mukathezhuthu"-The face painting of Theyyam, the religious ritual art form in Thalassery

In the colonial era, Thalassery was the centre of learning in north Kerala. The first Malayalam newspapers, novels, and short stories in Malayalam were written there. Earlier, the well known romantic poem in Malayalam, "Veenapoovu" (Fallen Flower) of Kumaran Asan was published from Thalassery. It was the birthplace of the Communist movement in Kerala. Rajya Samacharam, the first Malayalam newspaper, was published from Thalassery.

The Government of Kerala has included Thalassery in its heritage city project, which includes the preservation of historial structures.

== Circus ==
Vishnu Pant Chhatre's Great Indian Circus's was established 1880, in Bombay, the first circus establishment in India. A tour of Thalassery led to the meeting of Chhatre with Keeleri Kunhikannan a martial arts trainer. Keeleri Kunhikannan established the first dedicated circus school in India in 1901. He is known as "the father of Kerala Circus". A Circus Academy was inaugurated in Thalassery in 2010.

== Architecture ==
Before the 1900s, the majority of the population who were in lower middle class society had small houses, with coconut leave-thatched roofs and stone. The soil strength of north Kerala is high when compared to southern region so the traditional houses of upper class society was built using well finished stone walls where as in southern regions was mainly built using woods. The royal proclamation by the Maharaja of Travancore in 1817 and 1857, abolishing the restriction of clay tiles as roofing material to the noble class resulted in the widespread use of clay tile roofing by common man throughout Kerala. In the middle of 19th century, Mangalore tiles became a common roofing material throughout Kerala. There was no influence of exotic architecture in the region In the modern era majority of the house holds are individual concrete apartments and there are few flat habitation coming up in the region.

== Cuisine ==
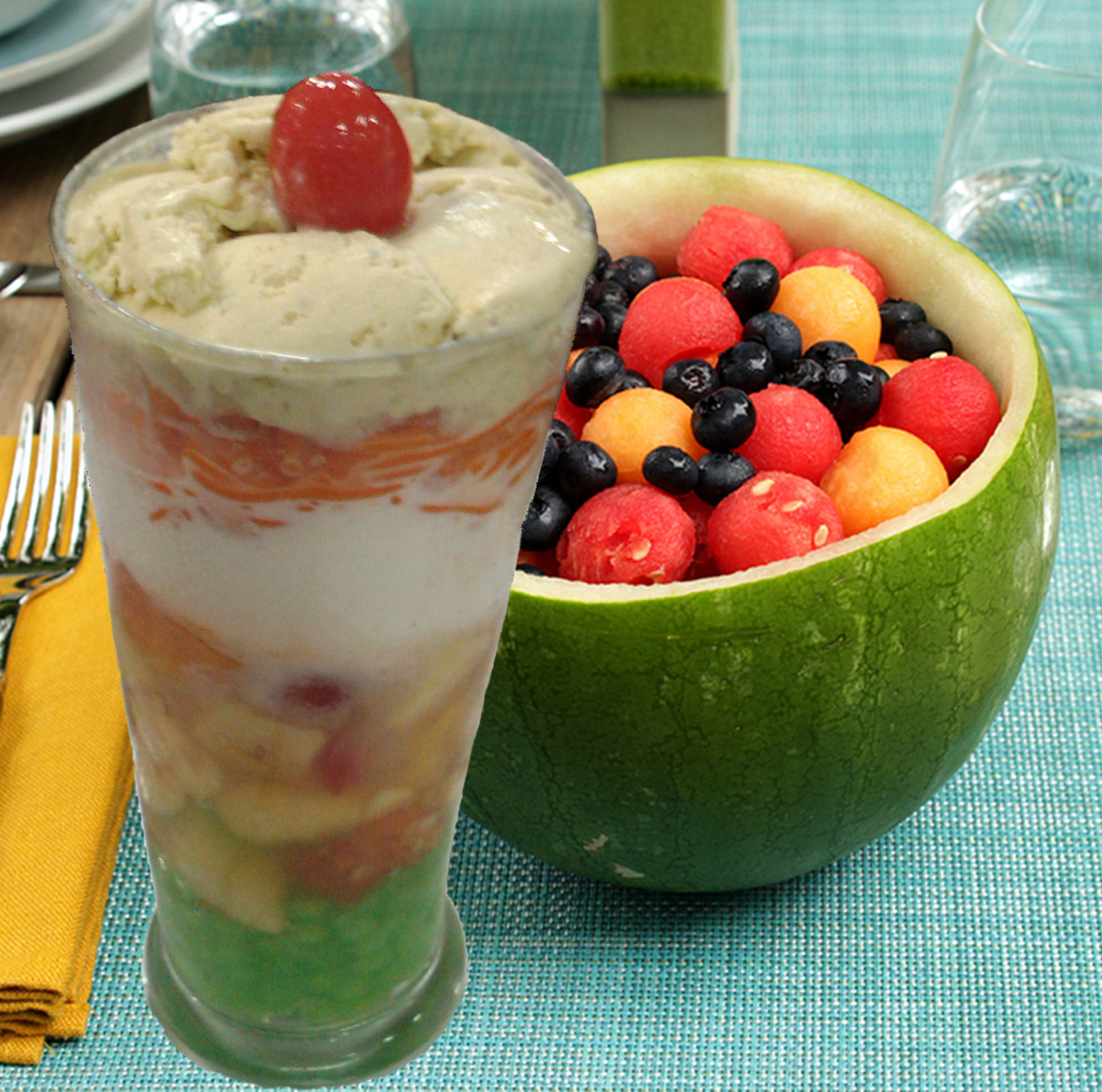
Thalassery Falooda

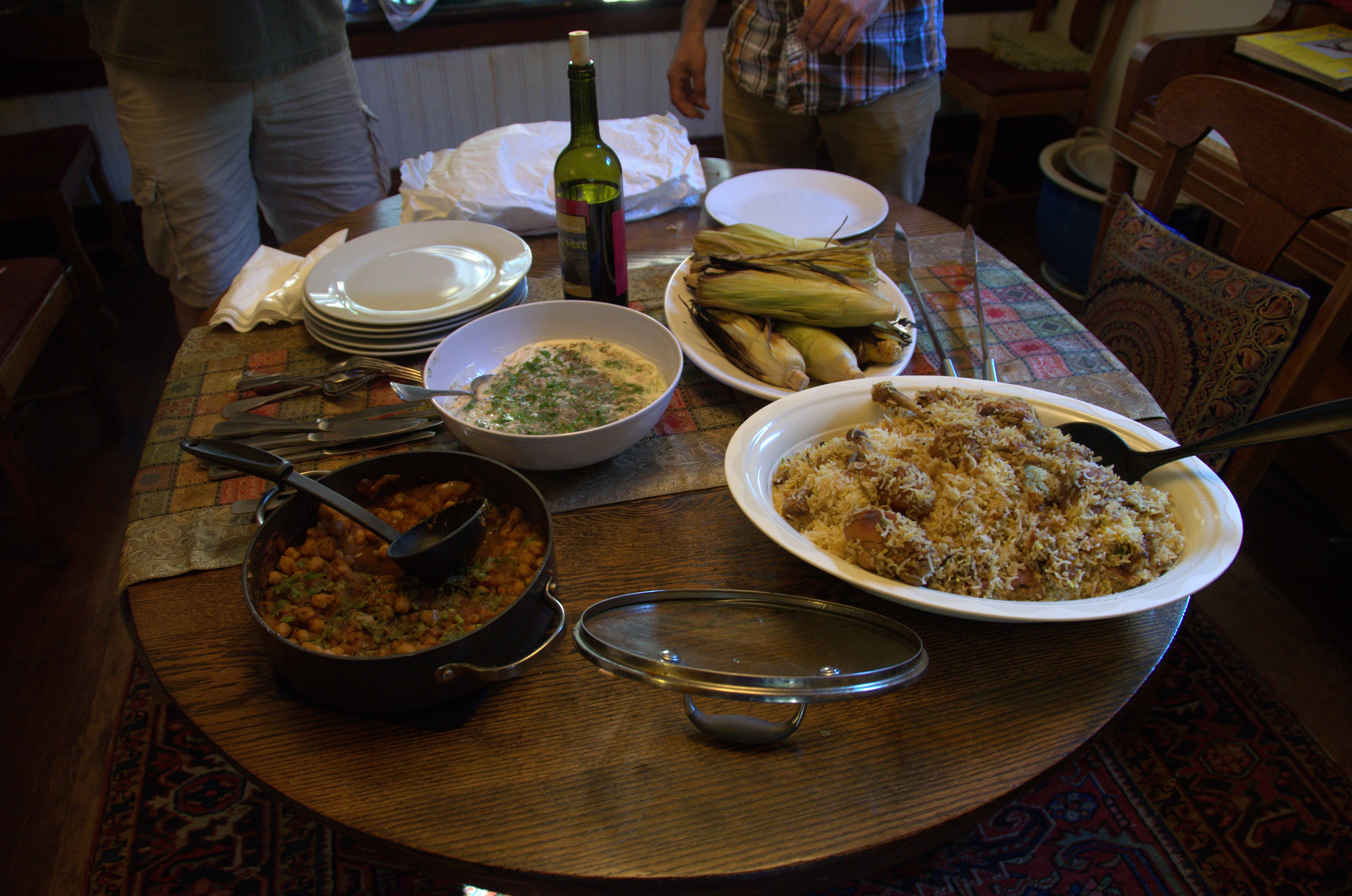
Thalassery biriyani

Thalassery is known for its biryani (in local dialect, biri-yaa-ni) Unlike other biriyani cuisines Thalassery biryani uses Kaima/Jeerakasala rice instead of the usual basmati rice. The influence of Arabian/Mughal culture is evident, especially in the dishes of the Muslim community, although many have become popular among all communities.

Thalassery Falooda is a regional variant of the Persian dessert. This is a cocktail of fruit salad, dry fruits such as black current, pistachio, cashew, almond (badam), rose milk and vanilla ice cream.

The Asian Green Mussel (Perna viridis) cuisines are favored in Thalassery dishes. The mussel is called Kallu-mma-kaya (fruit on the stone). They grow on rocks in contact with sea. Other dishes include Kallummakaya porichathu (fried mussel), Arikkadukka (mussel fried in rice batter), pickled mussels. Elambakka mussels are also popular. The green mussel's popularity led farmers to employ aquaculture in local rivers to increase supplies. Thalassery natives are known for their generous honouring and serving dishes for guests.

Another Thalassery dish is Kozhi-kkalu, made of sliced and fried tapioca. Pappadam-Pazham kuzhakkal, Aval um Poriyum kuzhakkal are other popular dishes.

Muttamala, Taripoli, Pazham nirachatu (fried banana filled with grated coconut sugar or jaggery), Unnakaya, Kaayi pola, Chatti pathiri and Ari pathiri are other local dishes. Porridges such as Mutaari kachiyatu (ragi porridge), are popular.

== Theyyam ==
Theyyam is a ritual performance art form that depict the cultural heritage of North Malabar, especially of ancient Kolathunad. Theyyam depicts Shiva bhutaganas, Kali and other deities and cultural heroes. The drama is enacted based on ancient stories and the language used is "Tottam pattu", a primitive form of Malayalam. Theyyam shows the Buddhist influence from centuries ago. Theyyam is usually held from October to May every year. The colour of Theyyam is typically red. Velan is described in the Sangam literature 500 CE. It could have been a tribal ritual art which evolved under Buddhism and the Brahminic revival of Hinduism. This art form is addressed as "Kaliyattom" North of Pazhayangadi Puzha, Kannur, as "Theyyam" South of the river and as "Thira" around Thalassery.

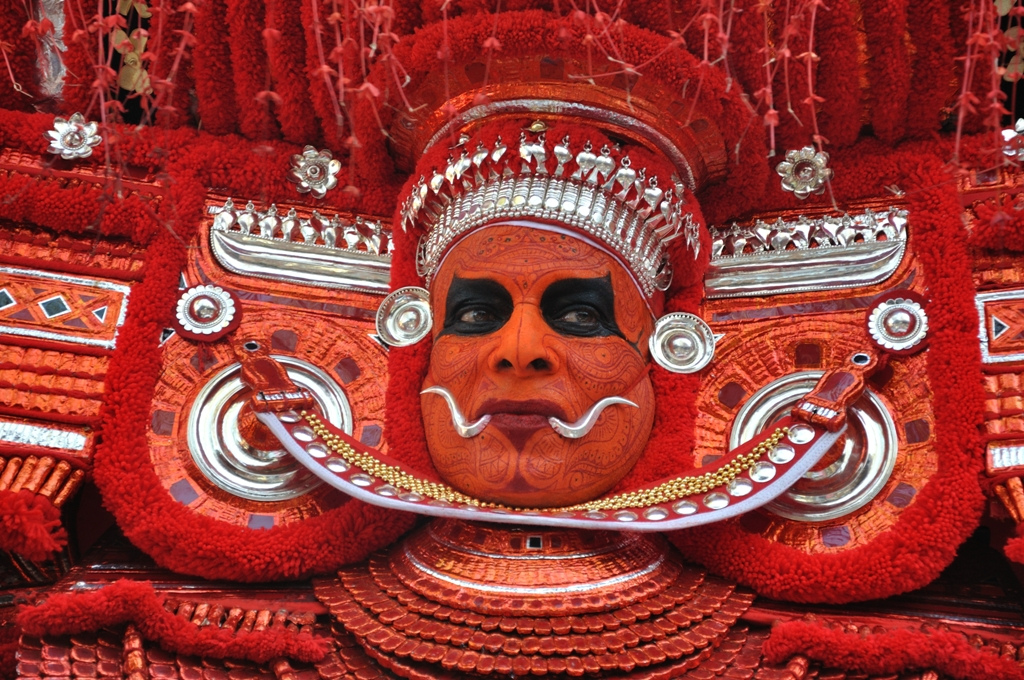
Muchilottu Bhagavathi Theyyam

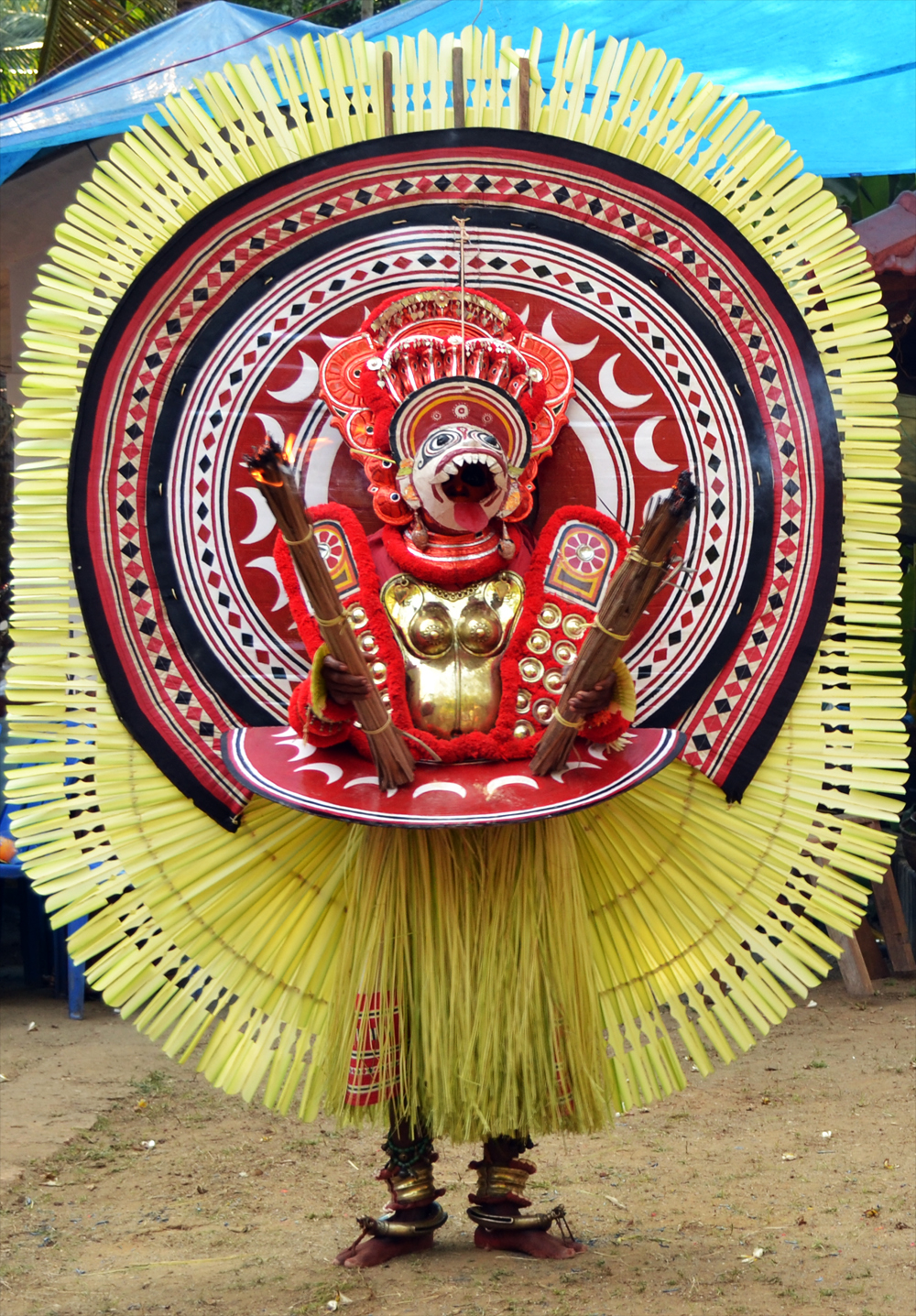
Kundadi Chamundi Theyyam

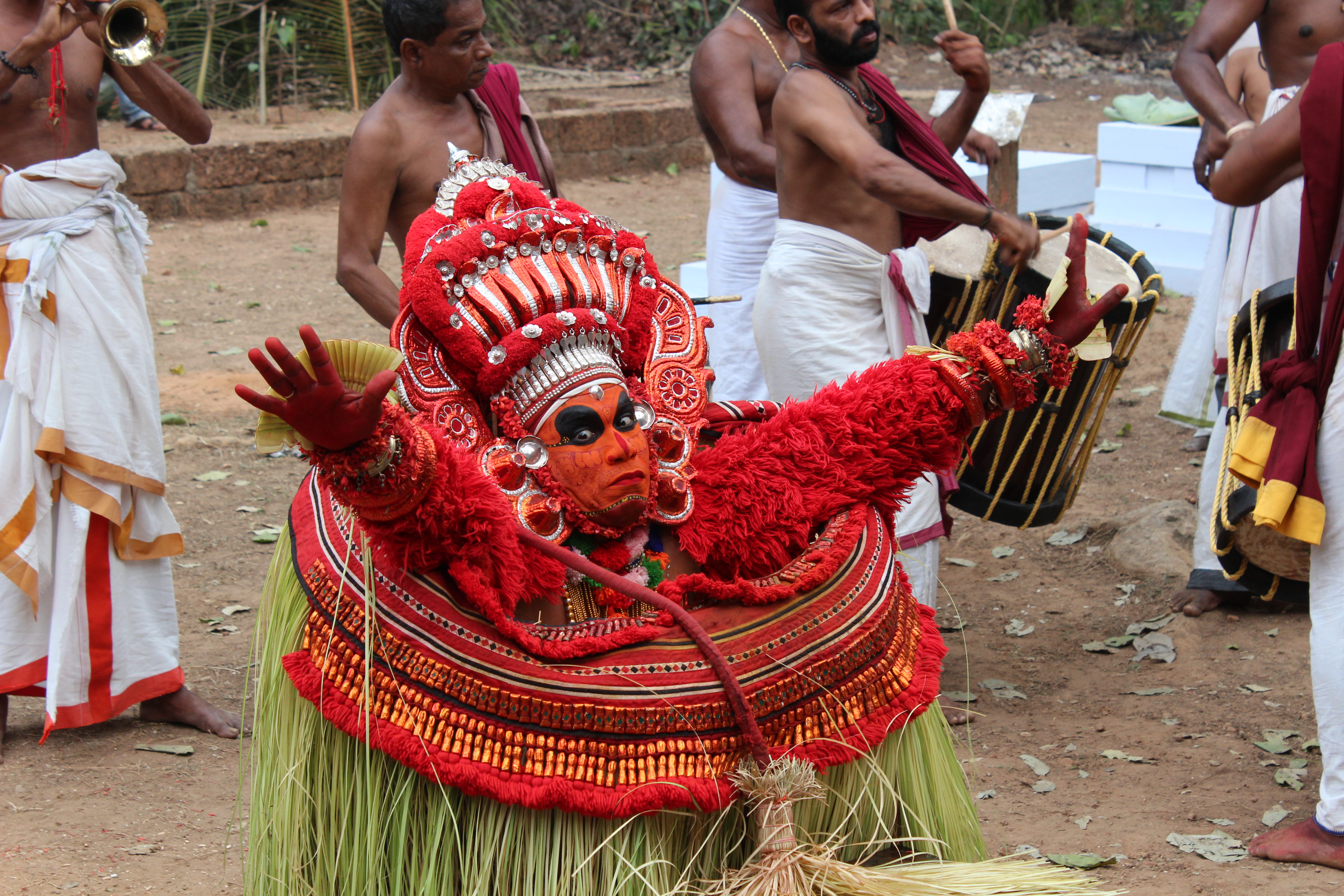
Vishnumoorthi or Chamundi Theyyam

== Kalari Payattu ==
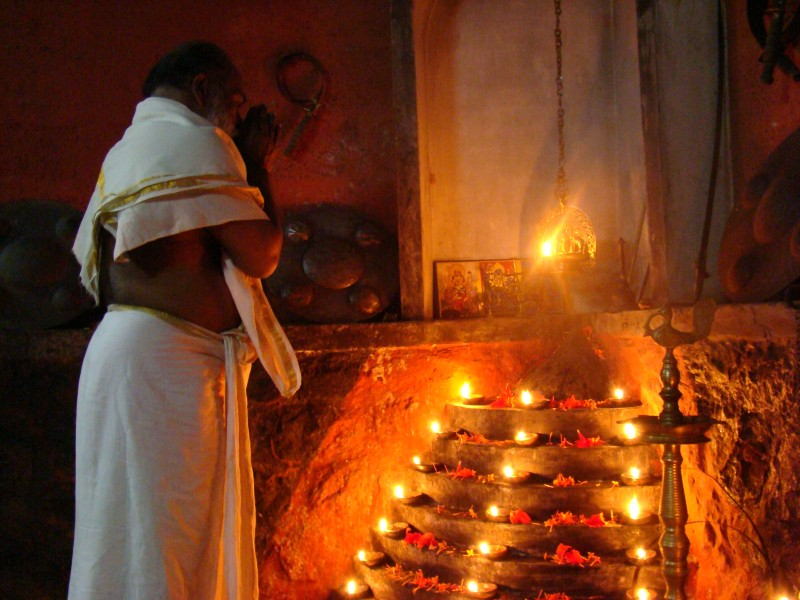
Inside of Kalari

Kalari payattu is a martial art practiced in Kerala Dharmapattanam (the current Dharmadam), Kadirur, Kadathanad (the current Vatakara) and Kuthuparamba. The British East India Company established their authority by destroying the traditional military character of the community of Malabar.

The Mysorean invaders destroyed traditional institutions, landholding patterns and supremacy of local rulers, along with the power and prestige of the Malabar militia, leading to the decline of Kalari. On 20 February 1804, Robert Richards, the Principal Collector of Malabar, wrote to Lord William Bentinck, President and General-in Council, Fort. St. George, asking permission to take action against persons carrying arms, either imposing death penalty or deportation for life. Lord Bentinck issued an order on 22 April 1804, that those who concealed weapons or disobeyed the orders of the British against carrying arms, would be deported. At the time of the Pazhassi rebellion, British soldiers raided rebel homes to confiscate their arms.

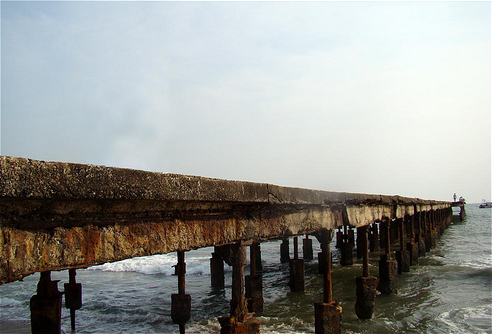
Kadal palam

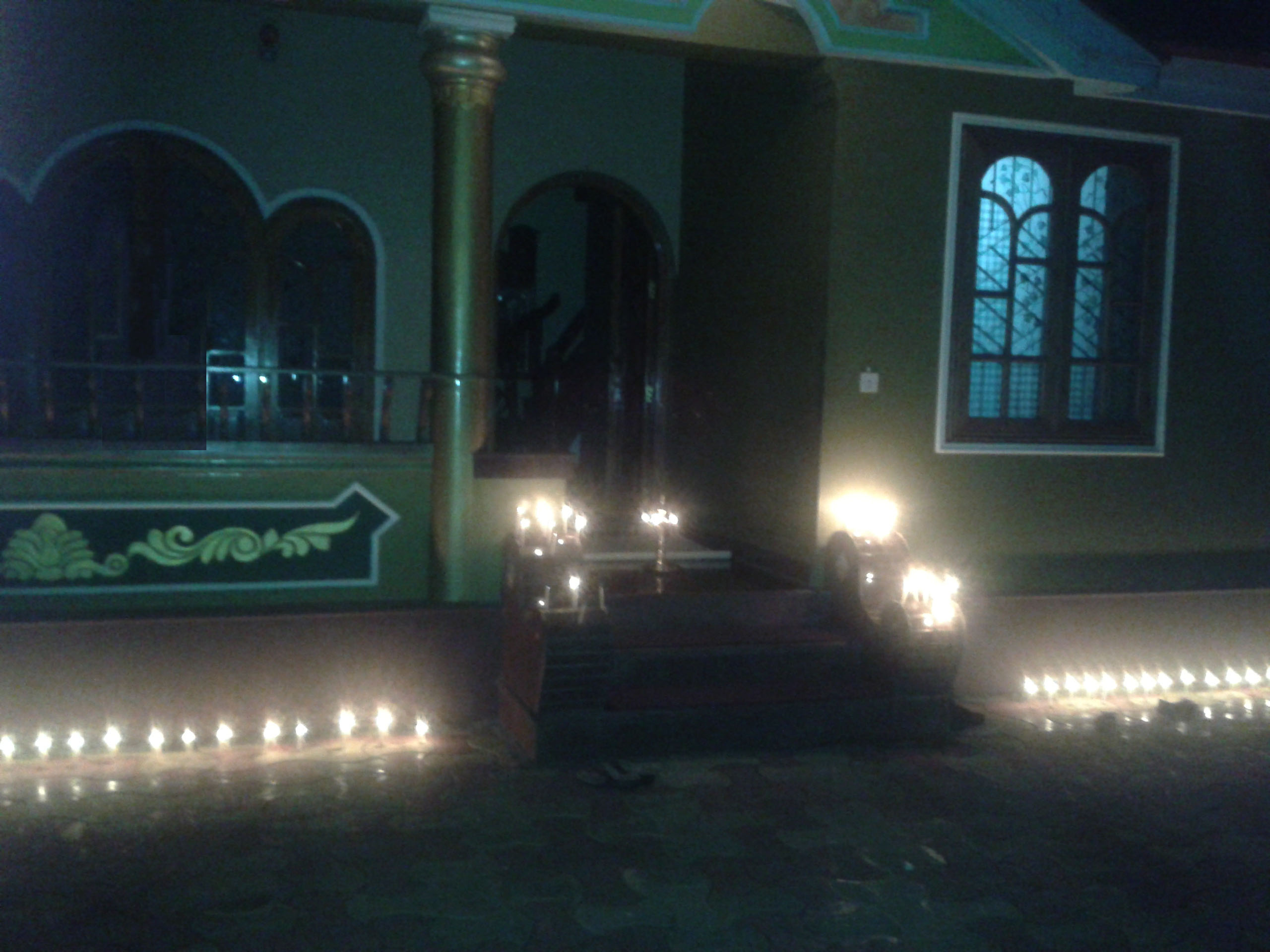
Chatayam celebrations (Birth anniversary of Shri Narayana Guru), is unique in Kannur and Thalassery wherein the natives light lamps in their houses, similar to Deepavali in reverence to the consecration of Jagannath temple on 13th February 1908 by Sri Narayana Guru

Thalassery is one of the major centres of Vadakkan Kalari. Kalari Payattu had a revival after a resurgence of public interest from Thalassery in 1920. A public protest was led by C V Narayanan Nair.

== Archaeological excavations ==
=== Cheraman Perumal-Chera Empire Fort ===
The sister of the last Cheraman Perumal, Sreedevi is believed to have resided in Dharmapattanam (the present Dharmadam), near Thalassery. The fort was located in a strategic hilly area where a 360 degree view of land and sea tens of kilometres in radius is clearly visible. The relics is seen in the campus of Govt. Brennan College. The relics of the Chera Empire fort are seen in that hill near the college premises especially near to the water tank area.

=== Megalithic laterite dome ===
A laterite dome of the megalithic age was discovered in Kodiyeri, near Thalassery. Kannur University Anthropology Department head S. Gregory, who led the excavation, said similar excavations were done earlier in Sreekandapuram 40 years before. A rock-cut cave of mostly of megalithic age was found near the Jagannath Temple in Thalassery.

=== Pier cannons ===
In June 2013 several cannons estimated to be 250 to 300 years old were unearthed near Thalassery Pier. It was one of the largest finds of cannons in Kerala.

In India the British East India Company first used cannons in Thalassery, during the local rebellion led by Kurungoth Nair, according to Kurup.
