= Giuseppe Chiarini =

Giuseppe Chiarini may refer to:

- Giuseppe Chiarini (circus director) (1823–1897), Italian-born equestrian and circus director
- Giuseppe Chiarini (literary critic) (1833–1908), Italian writer and literary critic who discovered the talent of Gabriele D'Annunzio
