= Sreedharan Champad =

Indian Malayalam-language writer (1938–2024)

- Born: P. K. Sreedharan; 1938; Champad, Madras Province, British India
- Died: 14 June 2024 (aged 86); Kannur, Kerala, India
- Occupations: Circus artist, circus historian, writer
- Spouse: Valsala
- Children: 4
- Writing career
- Notable work: An Album of Indian Big Tops: (History of Indian Circus)
- Notable awards: Kerala Sahitya Akademi Award for Overall Contributions

Sreedharan Champad (1938 – 14 June 2024) was an Indian circus artist, circus historian and Malayalam-language writer from Kerala. He worked in a number of fields, including working as circus manager, flying trapeze artist, circus company public relations officer, auto driver, bill collector, journalist and writer. Champad wrote over 20 books including novels, more than 100 short stories, biographies and articles. His book An Album of Indian Big Tops chronicles the history of the circus industry in India from 1880 to 2010.

== Biography ==
Champad was born in 1938 at Champad near Thalassery, Kannur district, to Kunjikannan and Narayani. After passing tenth class, he joined Devagiri College, Kozhikode, but due to financial constraints he dropped his study and went to Madras. In 1956, he joined the Great Rayman circus in Howrah as an office clerk and later became a trapeze artiste at the circus. Sreedharan was also an expert trapeze player in circuses such as Jumbo, Gemini, Amar and Great Raymond. In 1961, while at Chengalpet, he temporarily left the circus field, when the Great Eastern Circus rejected him to go with its Malaysian tour. After studying automobile engineering in Madras for two years, he worked as a diesel mechanic in the Madras State Transport Corporation for six months. After that he worked as an auto driver in Kozhikode for some time. Sridharan also served as the Editor-in-Chief of Padayani Weekly published from Thalassery, Padayani News Editor and Jagannath Magazine Editor. He also worked as a correspondent for Kaumudi News Service for five years.

"Ring Boy" published in Mathrubhumi Weekly in 1964 was his first story. His first novel Anyonyamthedi nadannavar was published in Mathrubhumu weekly in 1977. Champad was recently working on a new novel on the socio-cultural context of Panoor and its environs since 1947.

He and his wife Valsala had four children. He resided at his house Srivastsa at Pathayakunnu, Pattiam in Kannur district.

Champad died at his house in Kannur on 14 June 2024, at the age of 86.

== Contributions ==
=== Literary contributions ===
- Champad, Sreedharan (September 2013). An Album of Indian Big Tops (History of Indian Circus). Strategic Book Publishing. ISBN 978-1-62212-766-5. This book chronicles the history of circus industry in India from 1880 to 2010.
- Champad, Sreedharan (2012). Thamp Paranja Jeevitham. Kottayam: DC Books. ISBN 978-81-264-3901-0. OCLC 833631326. Autobiography.
- Sarkkasinte lokam (Meaning: world of circus)
- Keeleri, Biography of Keeleri Kunjikannan
- C. V. Narayanan Nair
- Raktham Chinthiyavar
- Anyonyam Thedi Nadannavar
- Komali
- Ring
- Koodaram
- Antharam
- Arangettam Circus Kathakal
- Clint
- Thacholi Othenan
- Payyampally Chanthu
- Aromal Chekavar
- Unniyarcha
- Thamp
- Mela, this was later made into a Malayalam movie
- Athippara
- Utharaparvvam
- Mahacharithamala123
- Gurudevakathamrutham

=== Cinema ===
He was instrumental in the background of films like Thampu, Mela, Aaravam, Kummatty, Apoorva Sahodarangal, Joker and Bhumimalayalam. He was also the author of the Malayalam documentaries named Circus and Cirus Lokam (Circus World) broadcast by Doordarshan.

== Awards and honours ==
- Kerala Sahitya Akademi Award for Overall Contributions 2014 for his outstanding contribution to Malayalam literature.
- First Vagbhadananda Prathibha Puraskaram
