= Gemini Shankaran =

Indian businessperson (1924–2023)

- Born: Moorkkoth Vengakkandi Sankaran; 13 June 1924; Kolassery, Malabar District, Madras Presidency, British India (now Kannur district, Kerala, India)
- Died: 23 April 2023 (aged 98)
- Occupations: Circus owner, businessperson
- Known for: Pioneering circus industry in India
- Spouse: Shobhana
- Children: 3
- Parents: Kavinisheri Raman Nair (father); Moorkoth Kalyaniyamma (mother)
- Awards: Government of India Lifetime Achievement Award

Moorkkoth Vengakkandi Sankaran (13 June 1924 – 23 April 2023), popularly known as Gemini Shankaran, was an Indian circus owner, businessperson and one of the pioneers of the circus industry in India. Sankaran was a recipient of the Lifetime Achievement Award from the Government of India.

== Biography ==
Shankaran was born to Kavinisheri Raman Nair and Moorkoth Kalyaniyamma on 13 June 1924, in Kolassery, a village in Kannur district, in the south Indian state of Kerala. His schooling was limited to 7th standard, after which he studied Kalaripayattu and circus from Keeleri Kunhikannan before starting a small time grocery store. The grocery business failed and Sankaran joined the Indian Army where he worked until the end of World War II. After leaving the military, he joined the Boss Lion Circus as a trapeze artist. In 1951, he purchased Vijaya Circus for a sum of INR 6000 and renamed it as Gemini Circus. He later purchased Jumbo Circus.

Sankaran, as one of the pioneers of the India circus industry, wrote his autobiography, Malakkam Mariyunna Jeevitham, which was published in 2012. His life is also recorded in another biography, Gemini Shankaran and the Legacy of Indian Circus.

Sankaran was married to Shobhana, and the couple had two sons, Ajay Shankar and Ashok Shankar, and a daughter, Renu Shankar. He died on 23 April 2023, at the age of 98.

== See also ==
- Keeleri Kunhikannan
- History of Indian circus
