= Kakuzhi Kunjibappu Gurukkal =

Indian poet

Kakuzhi Kunhibappu Gurukkal
- Born: 1826; Tellicherry, Malabar, British India
- Died: 1878; Tellicherry
- Occupation(s): Poet, social worker

Kakuzhi Kunhibapu Gurukkal (1826–1878) was born in Thiyya family of Kakuzhi in Thalassery, Kannur. Learned Sanskrit in childhood; He also excelled in music. He was educated in Sanskrit by Pudusherry Kannan Gurukkal at Menappuram near Thalassery. After establishing his own school and running it, he was appointed as a teacher in the District School (1855) and continued in the same position after the Basel Mission took over the school. He was a teacher for almost fifty years and had a large number of disciples. He helped Gathuweiravasaiip in the writing of the book Vyakarana Question and Answer. As a child, Idampratham organized a Kathakaliyogam for Thiyya Community the children and participated in it.

Many scholars and among them great poets emerged in Malayalam in the 19th century. Among them many seem to have made their own reputations as social reformers. He was such a person. Major composed rajanas even as a poet.

== Bibliography ==
- Harichandracharitam Otantullal
- Bhagavad Gita kilipatu,
- Aesopinera Saropadeskathakath (in song form).
