= Koorara =

- village
- Location in Kerala, India Koorara (India)
- Coordinates: 11°46′0″N 75°33′0″E
- Country: India
- State: Kerala
- District: Kannur

Government
  - Body: Panchayath

Languages
  - Official: Malayalam, English
- Time zone: UTC+5:30 (IST)
- PIN: 670694
- Telephone code: 0490
- ISO 3166 code: IN-KL
- Vehicle registration: KL-
- Nearest city: Thalssery
- Lok Sabha constituency: Vatakara
- Civic agency: Panchayath
- Climate: Tropical monsoon (Köppen)
- Avg. summer temperature: 35 °C (95 °F)
- Avg. winter temperature: 20 °C (68 °F)

Koorara is a village in Kannur district, Kerala, India. It is situated in Mokeri panchayat, 10 kilometres (6.2 mi) east of the city of Thalassery.

== Transportation ==
The village lies between Kerala's State Highway 30 and State Highway 38.

The nearest railway station is Thalassery on Mangalore-Palakkad line. There are airports at Mangalore and Calicut.
