= New Mahe =

- Census Town
- Location in Kerala, India New Mahe (India)
- Coordinates: 11.706703°N 75.533066°E
- Country: India
- State: Kerala
- District: Kannur

Government
  - Body: New Mahi Grama Panchayath

Area
  - Total: 5.08 km^{2} (1.96 sq mi)

Population (2011)
  - Total: 17,732
  - Density: 3,490/km^{2} (9,040/sq mi)

Languages
  - Official: Malayalam, English
- Time zone: UTC+5:30 (IST)
- ISO 3166 code: IN-KL
- Website: http://lsgkerala.in/newmahepanchayat/

New Mahe is a census town and suburb of Thalassery City in the Kannur district of Kerala, India. It is geographically in Kerala but near Mahe, Pondicherry.

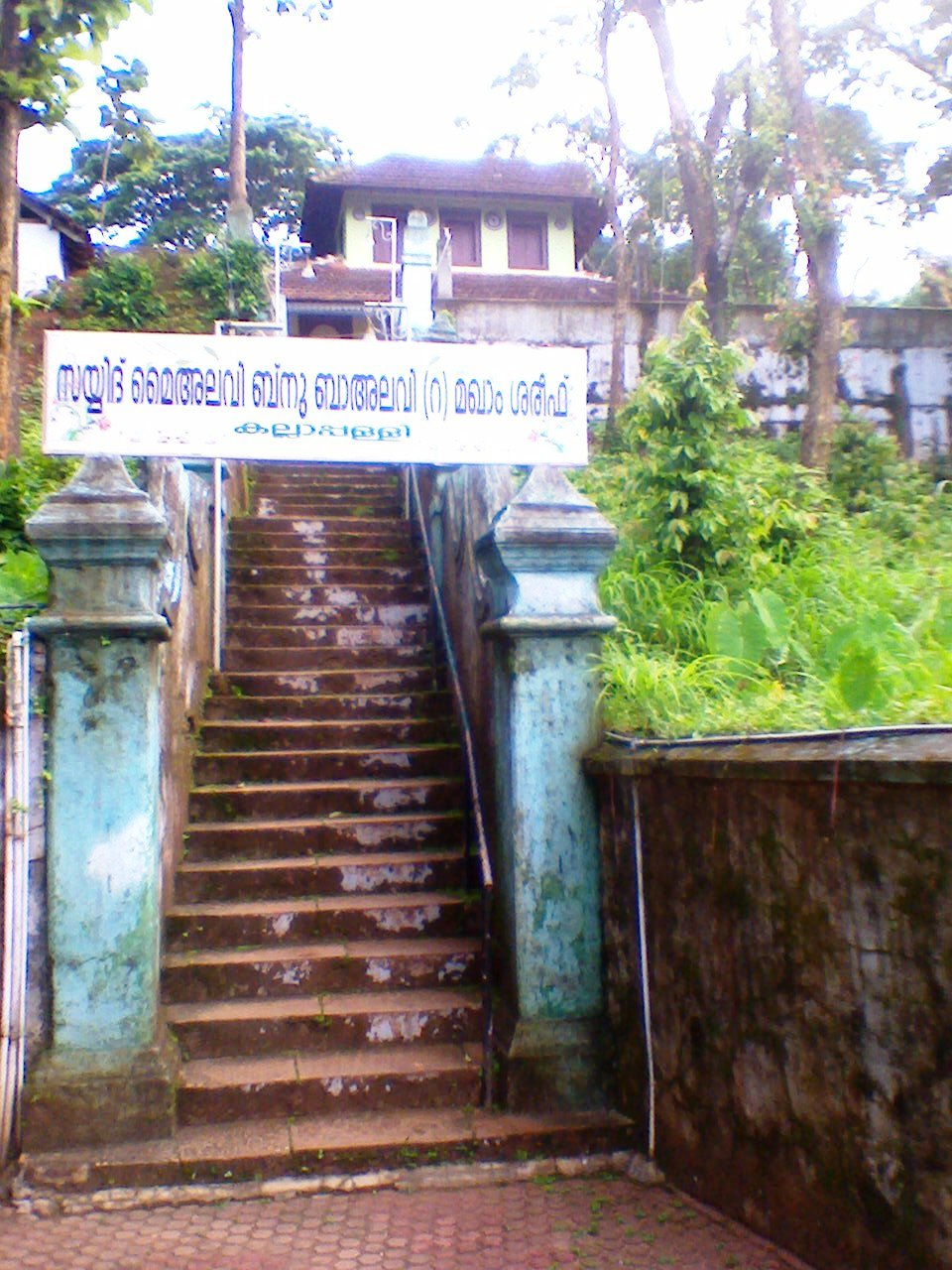
Kallappally Mosque, New Mahe

== Demographics ==
As of 2001 India census, New Mahe had a population of 11,230. Males constitute 46% of the population and females 54%. New Mahe has an average literacy rate of 86%, higher than the national average of 59.5%: male literacy is 86%, and female literacy is 85%. In New Mahe, 11% of the population is under 6 years of age.

== New Mahe Panchayat ==
The eastern part of New Mahe is called 'Kodiyeri'. Kodiyeri Balakrishnan member of CPI(M) central committee, CPI(M) Parliamentary Party Deputy Leader in the Kerala assembly and former minister of Kerala was born in Kodiyeri.

This village is sharing Arabian Sea in the west border, Mahe (Pudhucherry state) in South side, at North Thalassery Municipality .New Mahe Police Station is situated near to Kodiyeri Village Office. Kodiyeri is home to many famous personalities including former Home Minister Kodiyeri Balakrishnan, Justice T V Ramakrishnan etc.

Politically inclined to the left, CPM has the majority support. Malabar cancer center another contribution of the left government is one of the biggest cancer hospital in the state of Kerala. Earlier Handloom weaving and Beedi industry was the main occupation of people but now it is declined.

NH 66 is passing nearby this town.

== Transportation ==
The national highway passes through Mahe town. Goa and Mumbai can be accessed on the northern side and Cochin and Thiruvananthapuram can be accessed on the southern side. The road to the east of Iritty connects to Mysore and Bangalore. The nearest railway station is Thalassery on Mangalore-Palakkad line. Trains are available to almost all parts of India subject to advance booking over the internet. Kannur International Airport is 31 kilometers away from New Mahe.
