= Chiarini's Royal Italian Circus =

Traveling circus company

Royal Italian Circus
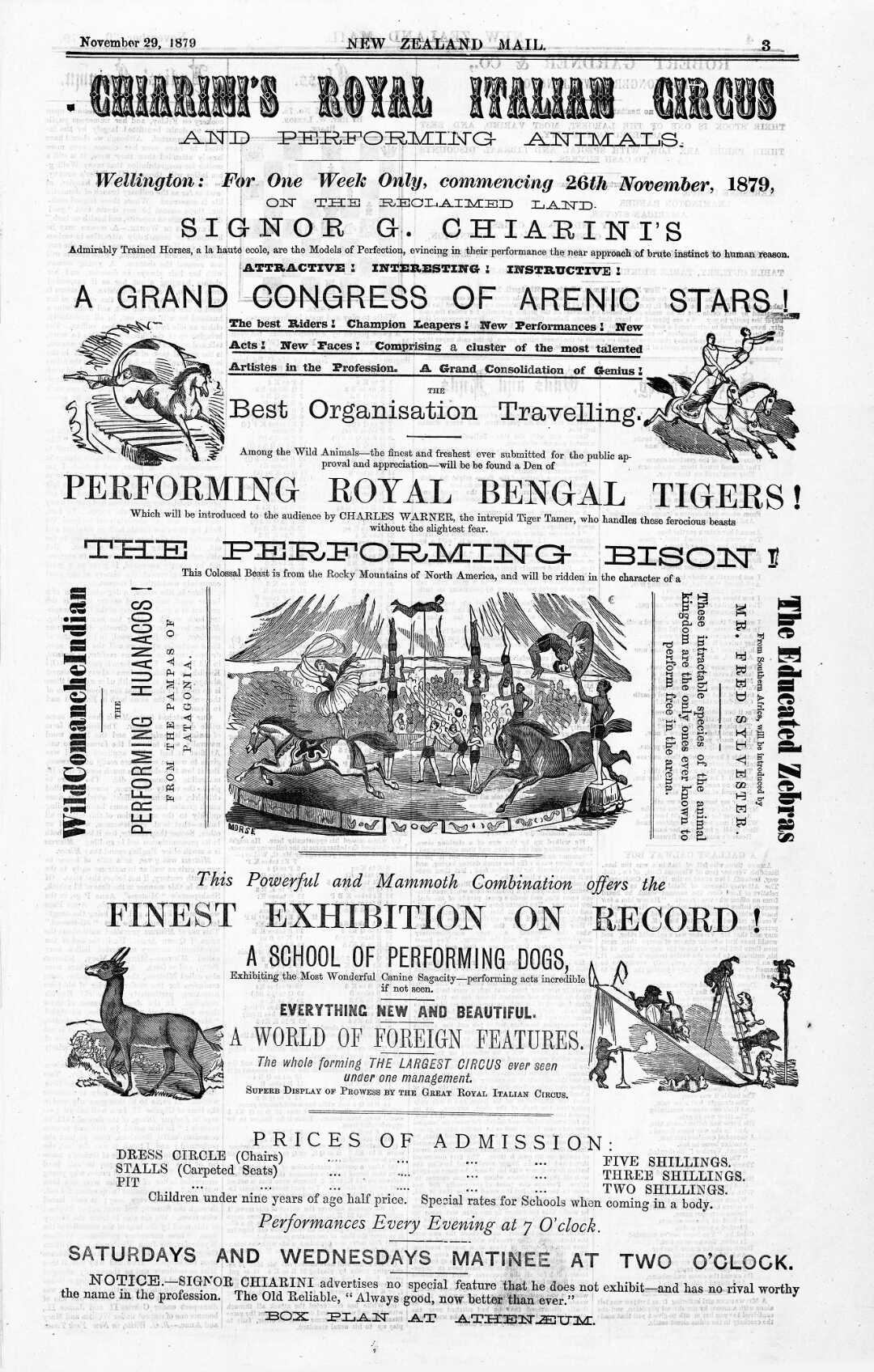
- Chiarini's Royal Italian Circus and Performing Animals, New Zealand Mail, 1879.

Origin
- Country: United States
- Founder(s): Signor Giuseppe Chiarini
- Year founded: 1856 (169 years ago)
- Defunct: Yes

Information
- Traveling show?: Yes
- Circus tent?: Yes

Chiarini's Royal Italian Circus and Performing Animals, also known as Chiarini's Circus and Menagerie or simply the Royal Italian Circus (Italian: Circo Italiano) was a renowned traveling circus company.

== History ==
Italian-born equestrian Giuseppe Chiarini established the international circus company as the director.

The circus first traveled across America in the mid-19th century and then started abroad. In 1855, Chiarini's Italian Circus performed in Greenville, Ohio. Chiarini began touring Cuba in 1856 under the banner of the Royal Spanish Circus. He later adopted Chiarini's Royal Italian Circus, serving as the company's manager and proprietor. In 1859, a wooden circus was provisionally opened in Havana for Smith & Chiarini's equestrian troupes. In 1863, Chiarini's circus company in Havana performed at Plaza de Armas. In January 1867, Chiarini's circus headed to Mexico. After an eleven-week run in San Francisco, Chiarini advertised more shows on the Californian tour in 1868, including Sacramento, Stockton, and Marysville. The circus had left for Panama and the cities of South America by steamer in 1869.

During a visit to Auckland, New Zealand, in January 1873, the circus company held an event. Chiarini's company landed in Melbourne in March 1873, arriving from New Zealand. On October 8, 1874, the troupe performed in Yokohama, Japan. In November 1879, returned to New Zealand in Wellington.

In 1880, the troupe consisted of an American bison, two zebras, three full-grown Bengal tigers, three tiger cubs, eight performing dogs, over twenty well-trained horses, and six trick ponies.

Chiarini's Royal Italian Circus and Performing Animals appeared in Singapore in 1882. A performance in front of the Maharajah of Johor, whose state was located directly to the north of Singapore's Crown Colony, took place on January 30, 1883.

The troupe made an appearance in Adelaide, Australia, in 1884.

According to records, negotiations for the sale of Chiarini's menagerie and circus animals were underway with Chinese parties in 1889. Following a journey to Shanghai, just two elephants, twenty-three horses, fourteen ponies, two jacks, two goats, four monkeys, one brahma, and a large number of pigeons remained in the menagerie after part of it was sold.

The famed circus which travelled the world no longer existed upon Chiarini's death in 1897 in Panama City, Panama.

== Gallery ==
Visit of the Chiarini Circus to Shanghai, depicted by local painter Wu Youru.
