= Keeleri Kunhikannan =

Indian martial artist

- Born: 1858; Thalassery, Kerala, India
- Died: 1939 (aged 80–81)
- Occupations: Martial arts trainer; Gymnast
- Known for: Indian circus

Keeleri Kunhikannan (1858 – 1939) was an Indian martial arts trainer and gymnast. He was one of the earliest circus owners in India.

== Life ==
Kunhikannan was born in Thalassery in 1858. He was the gymnastic instructor of BEMP school, Thalassery. His fascination with circus started with the visit to Great Indian Circus in 1888. He started giving Circus training at a Kalari in Pulambil so that the trainees could work with the Great Indian Circus.

In 1901 he started a circus school in Chirakkara, the first of its kind in Kerala and the second in India. Kerala's first circus company was Malabar Grand Circus, founded at Chirakkara in 1904 by Pariyali Kannan, one of Kunhikannan's students. Gemini Sankaran, who started the Gemini Circus, was also one of his students. Other circus companies founded by his students include Whiteway Circus, Fairy Circus, Great Rayman Circus, Eastern Circus, Oriental Circus, Kamala Three Ring Circus, Great Bombay Circus and Great Lion Circus.

Kunhikannan died in 1939. Two years later his disciple M. K. Raman founded the Keeleri Kunhikannan Teacher Memorial Circus and Gymnastic Training Centre at Chirakkara which functions even today. In 2008 The Kerala government announced that a circus academy would be set up in Thalasseri in his memory.

His nephew Kannan Bombayo, whom he trained, was a circus performer as well.

== See also ==
- History of Indian circus
