= Giuseppe Chiarini (circus director) =

Italian circus owner (1823-1897)

- Born: Giuseppe Chiarini; 1823; Rome, Italy
- Died: 1897; Panama City, Panama
- Other names: Signor Chiarini
- Occupations: Equestrian; Circus owner

Giuseppe Chiarini (1823 – 1897) was an Italian equestrian, horse trainer, and international circus owner.

== Early history ==
Giuseppe Chiarini was born in Rome, Italy in 1823. Born into a renowned Italian dynasty, his father was a trick rider and trainer of horses.

== Circus life ==
Giuseppe became a pupil of Henri Franconi, and his trained horses were featured for a period among Franconi's show attractions. After studying under Franconi, the Italian equestrian opened his own circus in 1847 and made his way to America, where he began in San Francisco.

On June 28, 1852, Chiarini performed an equestrian act at the Astley's Royal Amphitheatre Programme.

Soon after, he traveled with his company to Cuba which was under Spanish colonial rule and established a circus in Havana. Between 1853 and 1856, he had begun touring the island of Cuba under the Royal Spanish Circus. He later adopted the name Chiarini's Royal Italian Circus, also known as Chiarini's Circus and Menagerie, acting as the manager and proprietor.

He travelled to Mexico around 1864 where he established his circus. While visiting Mexico, he staged a private exhibition at Chapultepec Castle. Maximilian I of Mexico reportedly bestowed Chiarini with a white Arabian thoroughbred named "Abd-el-kader" during his visit. The horse had a reputation for being untamable, yet Chiarini tamed it within 15 days. He then toured Chile, where the country's president presented the skilled equestrian with an Italian stud horse named "Garibaldi." Continuing his South American tour, he set up the circus at the corner of Avenida Tucumán and Calle Libertad in Buenos Aires, Argentina, in 1869, and returned in 1870. Chiarini went back to Europe next, gaining popularity in Lisbon and Madrid. The circus owner embarked on journeys to China and Brazil with his troupe.

In 1884, Chiarini travelled with his renowned circus to Adelaide, Australia. He reached Manila in May 1886, where he established himself in the Philippine city's entertainment scene for two months. Arriving in Japan by July 1886, Chiarini made his debut in Tokyo and spent September and October touring the Kantō region. His troupe performed before Emperor Meiji on November 1, 1886.

== Family ==
He had a son, Ernesto Abel Chiarini, with an American woman from Boston named Serafina Fleres.

== Death ==
Chiarini died in 1897 at the Hotel Americano in Panama City, Panama.
