= Thalassery =

Thalassery City Tellicherry
- City
- TLY
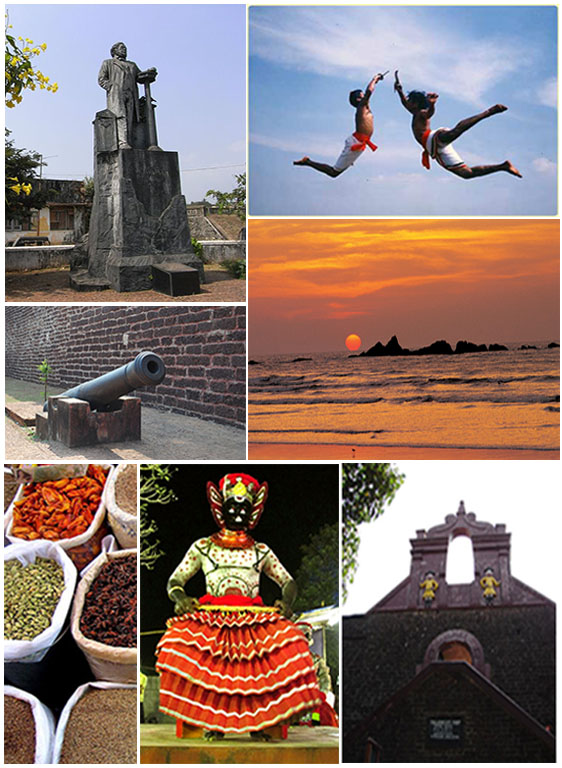
- Clockwise from top: statue of Hermann Gundert, Kalaripayattu, Muzhappilangad Beach, Tellicherry Fort, Theyyam, Thalassery spice market, a cannon inside St. Angelo Fort, Thalassery Pier

- Thalassery (india) Thalassery City (India) Thalassery City (Asia) Thalassery City (Earth)
- Coordinates: 11°44′56.8″N 75°29′20.4″E
- Country: India
- State: Kerala
- District: Kannur
- Municipality: 1 November 1866

Government
  - Type: Municipality
  - Body: Thalassery Municipality
  - Municipal Chairman: Karayi Chandrasekharan
  - Member of Legislative Assembly: A.N. Shamseer
  - Assistant City Commissioner of Police: V. Suresh

Area
  - Total: 23.96 km^{2} (9.25 sq mi)
- Elevation: 33.02 m (108.3 ft)

Population (2011)
  - Total: 92,558
- Demonym: Thalasserikaran

Languages
  - Official: Malayalam, English
- Time zone: UTC+5:30 (IST)
- PIN: 6701xx
- Telephone code: +91490xxxxxxx
- Vehicle registration: KL-58
- Sex ratio: 1000:1125 ♂/♀
- Parliament constituency: Vatakara
- Legislative Assembly constituency: Thalassery
- Website: thalasserymunicipality.lsgkerala.gov.in/en

Thalassery (Malayalam: [t̪ɐlɐʃ(ː)eːɾi]) (also called Tellicherry) is a city and municipality on the Malabar Coast in Kannur district in the state of Kerala, India, bordered by the districts of Mahe and Kozhikode. Thalassery municipality has a population of just under 100,000 as of 2011 census. Thalassery Heritage City has an area of 23.98 square kilometres (9.26 sq mi). Thalassery has an altitude ranging from 2.5 to 30 metres (8 ft 2 in to 98 ft 5 in) above mean sea-level. It is located 25 km (15 mi) from Vadakara, 15 km (10 mi) from Mahé and 22 km (13 mi) from Kannur.

Tellicherry municipality was formed on 1 November 1866 according to the Madras Act 10 of 1865 (Amendment of the Improvements in City act 1850) of the British Indian Empire, making it the second oldest municipality in the state. At that time, the municipality was known as Tellicherry Commission and Tellicherry was the capital of North Malabar. G. M. Ballard, the Malabar collector, was the first president of the municipal commission. A European barrister, A. F. Lamaral, would later become the first Chairman of Thalassery municipality. Thalassery grew into a prominent place during European rule, due to its strategic geographic location. Thalassery has played a significant historical, cultural, educational and commercial role in the history of India, especially during the colonial period. On 9 February 2014, Thalassery taluk was split in two and Iritty taluk was formed. The northeastern hilly region of the former Thalassery Taluk, including Peravoor, Aralam, Ayyankunnu, Kottiyoor, and Kelakam, are within the Iritty Taluk area.

== Etymology ==
The name Thalassery likely originated from a combination of the Dravidian words Thala (Head) and cheri (low lying settlement), meaning 'starting place of a settlement' or 'head of a settlement'. It could also have emerged from Talakkathe cheri, a combination of Talakkathe (upper or north) and Cheri (settlement).

The second volume of the 1885 administration manual of the former Madras Presidency cites, which includes information on the research of regional legends and folklore, indicates that the name Thalassery in ancient Sanskrit literature was Shwetaranyapura.

== Modern history ==
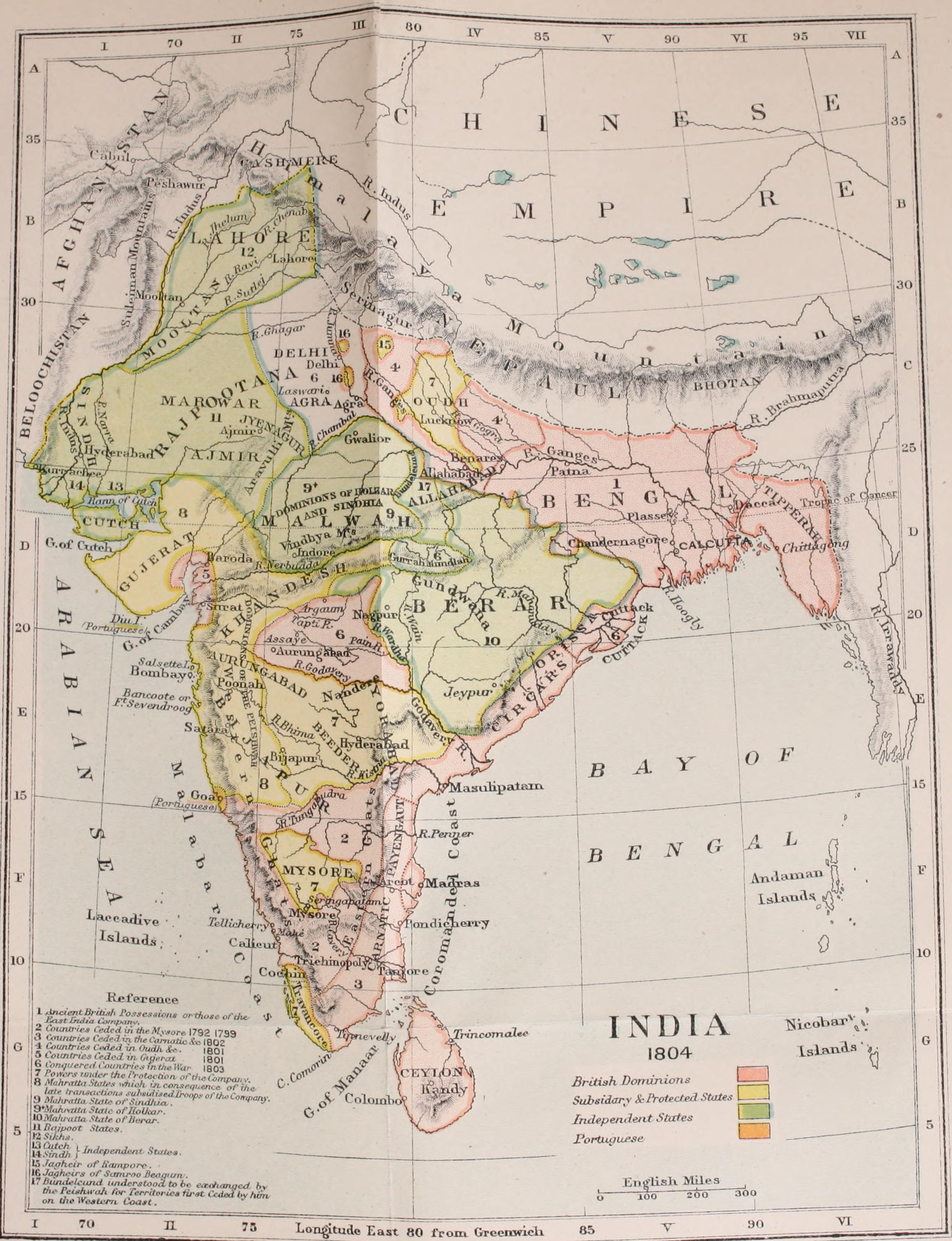
An old map of India in 1804. Note that only Thalassery, Kozhikode, and Kochi, are marked as cities within the present-day state of Kerala.

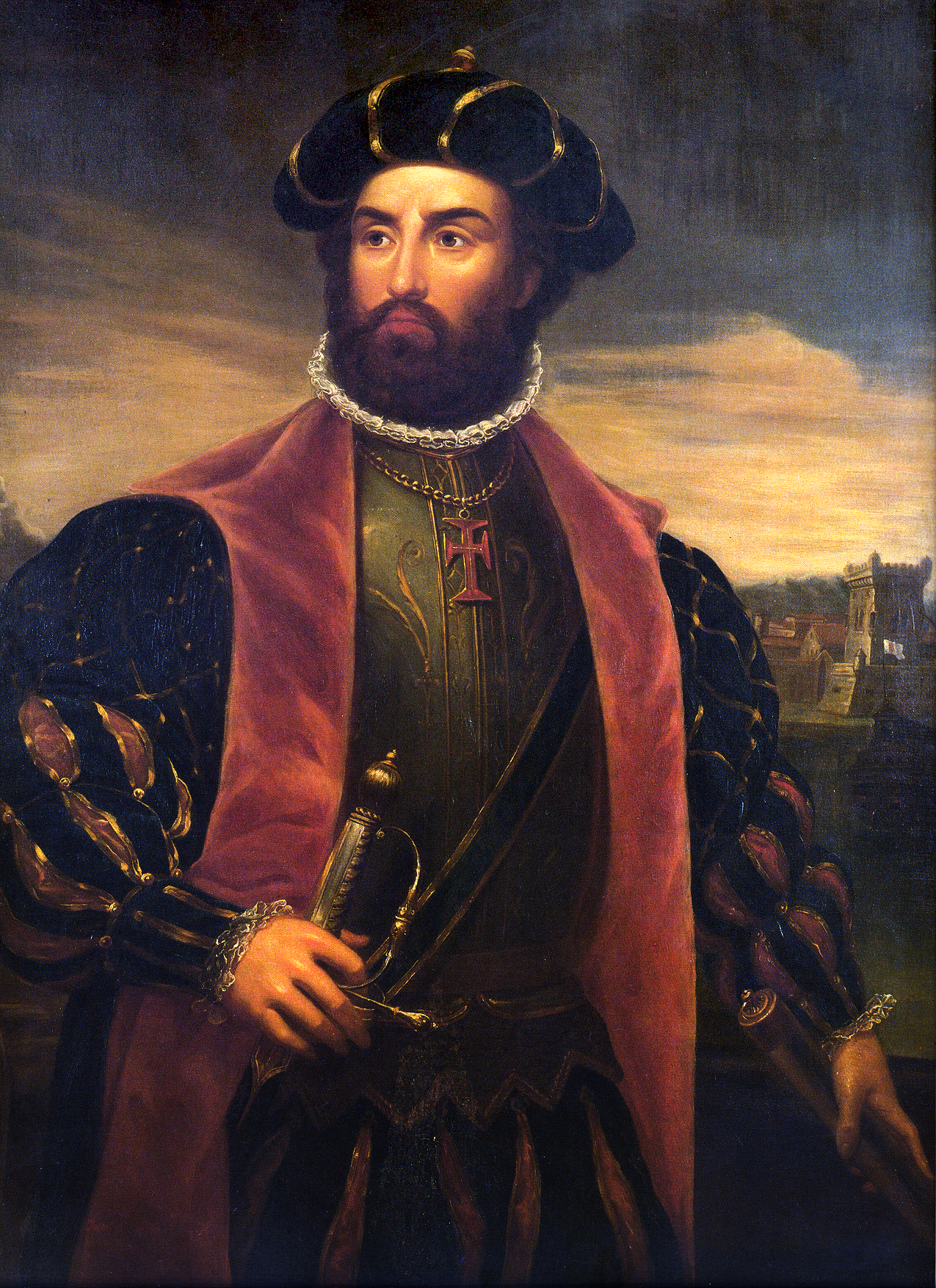
The trade alliance between Vasco da Gama and Kolathiri gave Portugal direct access to the spice trade, especially for pepper.

Thalassery was a trade hub where Dutch, British, Portuguese, Chinese, Arab, and Jewish traders had considerable influence in the spice market.

The British established a trading post and built a factory at Tellicherry in 1694, having gained permission from Vadakkalankur, the prince regent of the Raja of Kolathunad. They had already been trading on the Malabar coast for much of that century, buying pepper from merchants, and had established a similar post at Travancore ten years earlier.

In 1761, the British captured Mahe, which lies adjacent to Thalassery, and the settlement was handed over to the ruler of Kadathanadu. The British restored Mahe to the French as a part of the 1763 Treaty of Paris. In 1779, the Anglo-French war broke out, resulting in the French loss of Mahe. In 1783, the British agreed to restore to the French their settlements in India, and Mahe was handed over to the French in 1785.

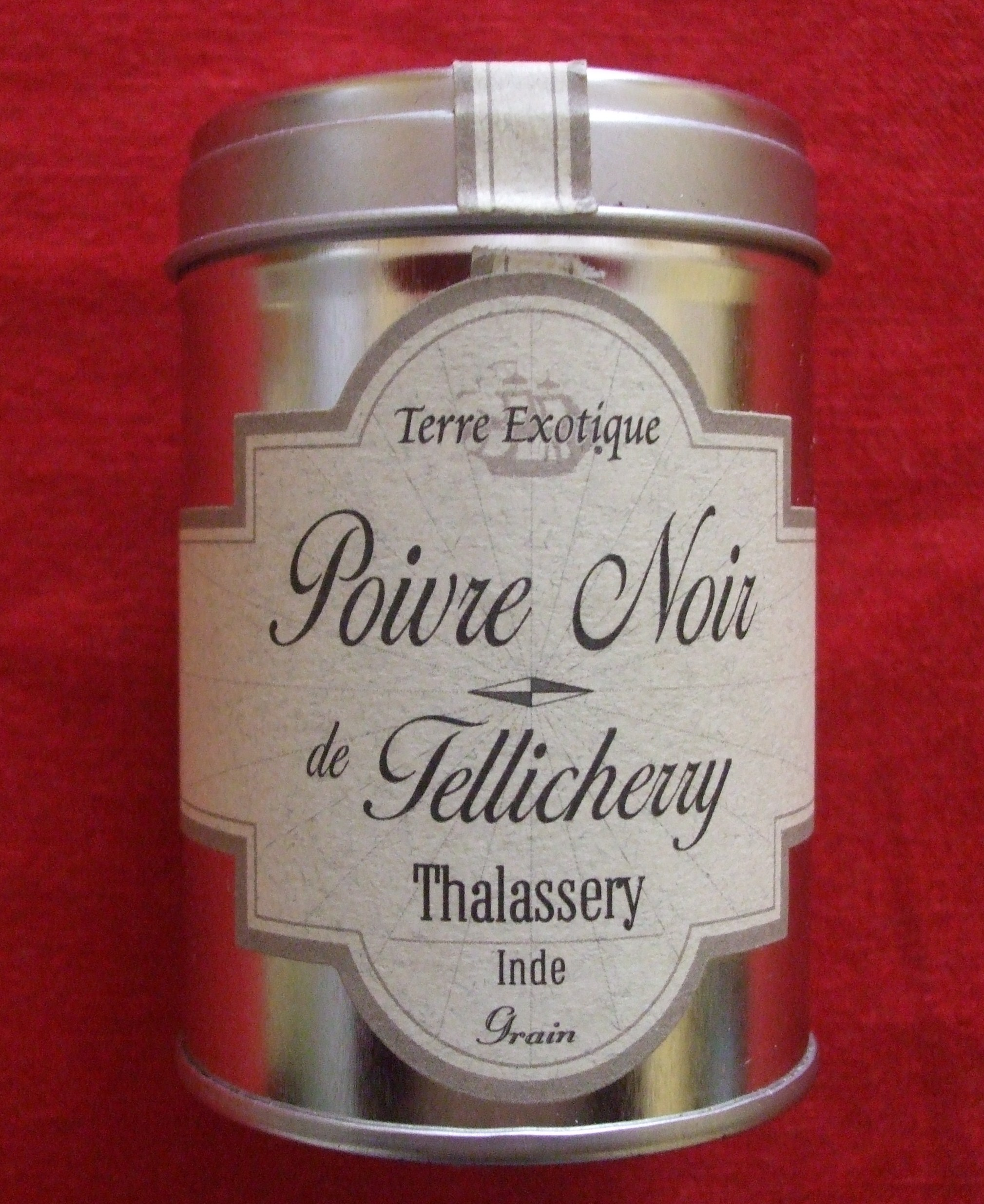
Tellicherry pepper is a black pepper variety. This is a product of Terre Exotique, France.

After the annexation of Malabar, the British called upon Thalassery, the royal families and other major Nair and Namboothiri feudal lords to return, but this was heavily opposed by some local rulers. Along with heavy taxation and laws that curbed free movement, the appeal resulted in multiple uprisings against the British with heavy casualties to British forces. Thousands of soldiers were killed, but the resistance was eventually defeated.

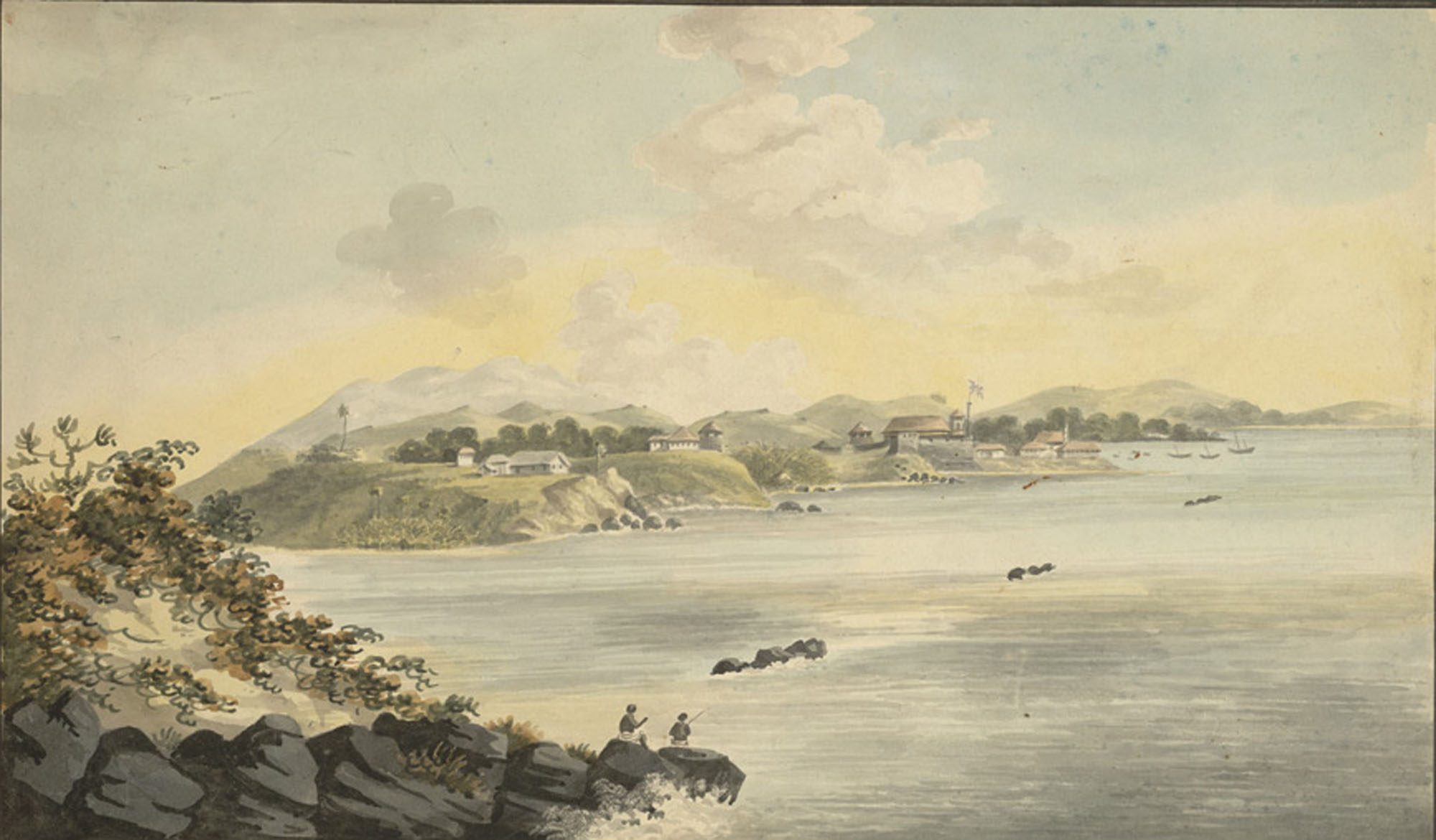
Watercolour painting of Tellicherry

== Geography ==
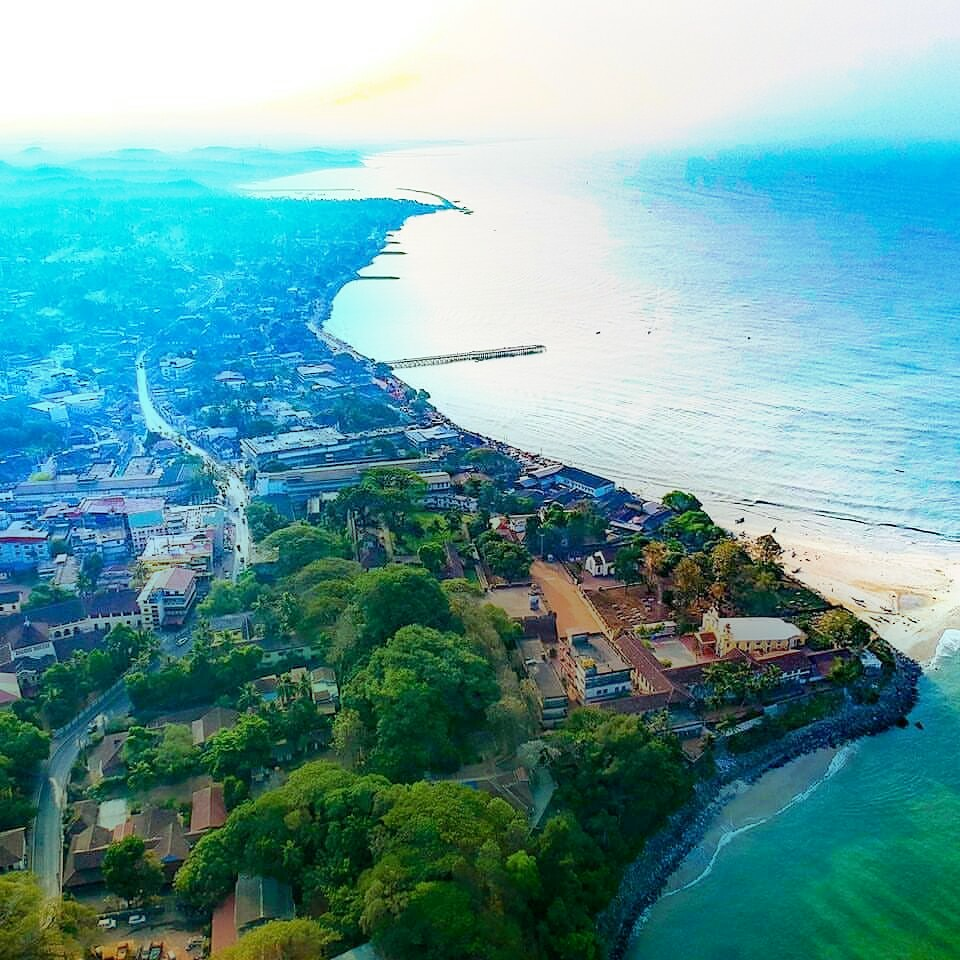
Aerial view of Tellicherry coast

Thalassery lies on the west coast of the Indian subcontinent, in the northern part of Kerala State. The city has Dharmadam Panchayat in the north, Eranholi and Kodiyeri in the east New Mahe in the south and the Arabian Sea on the west. The palm-fringed terrain has a scenic coastline and features four rivers, canals and hills with orange-hued rock. One of the four rivers is the Mahe River (Mayyazhipuzha). During the British Raj, the Mahe River was nicknamed the English Channel because it separated British-ruled Thalassery from French-ruled Mahe. Other rivers are Kuyyali River, Ummanchira River and Anjarakandi River. Muzhappilangad Beach, the sole beach where driving is possible in Kerala (with a 4 km long drivable area), is located within 6 km from the downtown part of Thalassery.

Unlike southern Kerala, the region of Thalassery does not have lagoons, although many rivers flow through it. Thalassery however has a large area of mangroves, which is now being protected. The coast has no delta formation. The coastal plain is only a few kilometres in width and is bordered by highlands. The north of Thalassery is Dharmadam, an island area surrounded by two rivers and the sea. On the eastern side, hilly areas start from Kuthuparamba.

== Demographics ==
As of the 2001 India census, Thalassery had a population of 92,558, making it Kerala's eighth largest city in population. Males constituted 47% of the population and females 53%. The city had an average literacy rate of 86%, higher than the national average of 59.5%. Both male and female literacy were 86%. In Thalassery, 10% of the population were under 6 years of age.

Social composition in Thalassery (2011)
Community	Percent
Thiyyar	43.93%
Other Hindu	17.44%
Islam	34.30%
Christianity	3.64%

The proposed Thalassery municipal corporation consists of the Thalassery municipality and panchayats of Eranholi, Kadirur, Dharmadam, Chokli, Panniyannur, Muzhappilangad, Pinarayi and New Mahe with a population of 304,708 and population density of 2718 as per 2011 census data.

Hindus made up 61.37% of the population, followed by Muslims (34.30%), and Christians (3.64%).

== Culture ==
Thalassery is nicknamed the city of three Cs—Cake, Cricket and Circus. The first bakery in Kerala was established in the city and cricket was first played in India here. The British had considerable impact on local culture. As an ancient trade center, the trading and business relations that existed with the Europeans and the Arabs brought people and ideas from many other lands. The European Christian missionaries and the educational reforms they brought played an important role in transforming society.

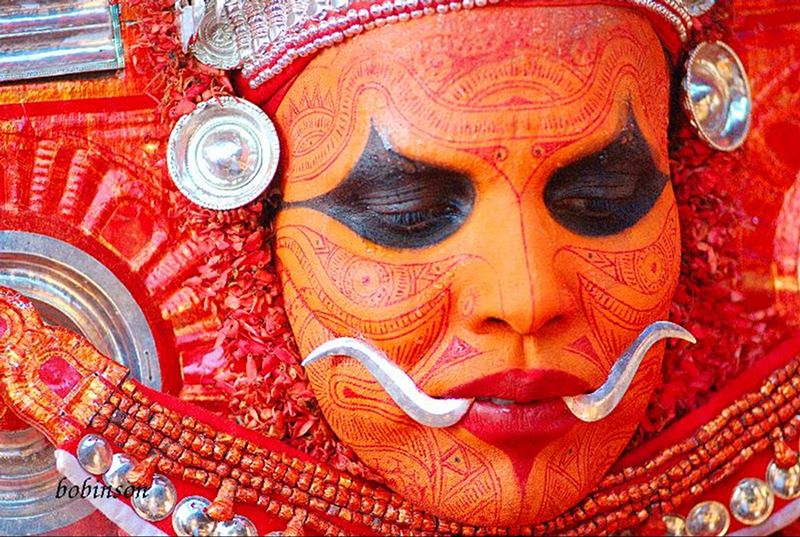
"Mukathezhuthu", the face painting of Theyyam, a religious ritual art form in Thalassery

The Government of Kerala has included Thalassery in its heritage city project. The project includes the preservation of historical structures. Thalassery cuisine (a blend of Arabian, Persian, Indian and European styles of cooking) is popular around the world. Thalassery biryani is popular as an ethnic brand, and Tellicherry pepper is also used in Europe.

Painting and sculpture exhibitions are frequently held at the Kerala Lalithakala Akademi art gallery located in Keezhantimukk, Thiruvangad.

=== Theyyam ===
Theyyam (or Thirayattam) is a ritual performance art form that depict the cultural heritage of North Malabar, especially of ancient Kolathunad. Theyyam depicts Shiva bhutaganas, Kali and other deities and cultural heroes and ancestors of the region. The drama is enacted based on ancient stories and the language used is "Tottam pattu", north Malabar dialect of Malayalam. Theyyam is usually held from October to May every year. The colour of Theyyam, is typically red. Velan, a reporter and prophet endowed with supernatural powers in Veriyatal is described in the Sangam literature 500 CE. It could have been a tribal ritual art which evolved under Buddhism and the Brahminic revival of Hinduism. This art form is called, variously, "Kaliyattom" or "Theyyam" or "Tirayattom", depending on the locality.

== Literature and journalism ==
The first Malayalam short story Vasanavikriti was written by Vengayil Kunhiraman Nayanar in Thalassery. Indulekha, the first major Malayalam novel was published from Thalassery. Veenapoovu, the poem by Kumaran Asan was also published from Thalassery. Thinker and orator M N Vijayan spent a lifetime in Thalassery. Thalassery is also home to writer N. Prabhakaran. Actor and screenwriter Sreenivasan hails from Thalassery.

William Logan was said to be fluent in Malayalam, Tamil and Telugu. He is remembered for his 1887 guide to the Malabar District, popularly known as the Malabar Manual.

Rajyasamacharam and Paschimodayam (the first two Malayalam newspapers) were published from Illikunnu, Nettoor in Tellicherry in 1847 by Hermann Gundert, who was the editor of the journal and was a religious propagator from the Basel Evangelical Mission Society (BEMP). Rajyasamacharam started publishing from Illikkunnu in Thalassery City.

== Circus ==
Vishnu Pant Chhatre's Great Indian Circus, established in 1880 in Bombay, was the first circus establishment in India. A tour of Thalassery led to the meeting of Chhatre with Keeleri Kunhikannan, a martial arts trainer. Keeleri Kunjikannan established the first dedicated circus school in India in 1901. He is known as "the father of Kerala Circus". A circus academy was inaugurated in Thalassery in 2010.

== Cuisine ==
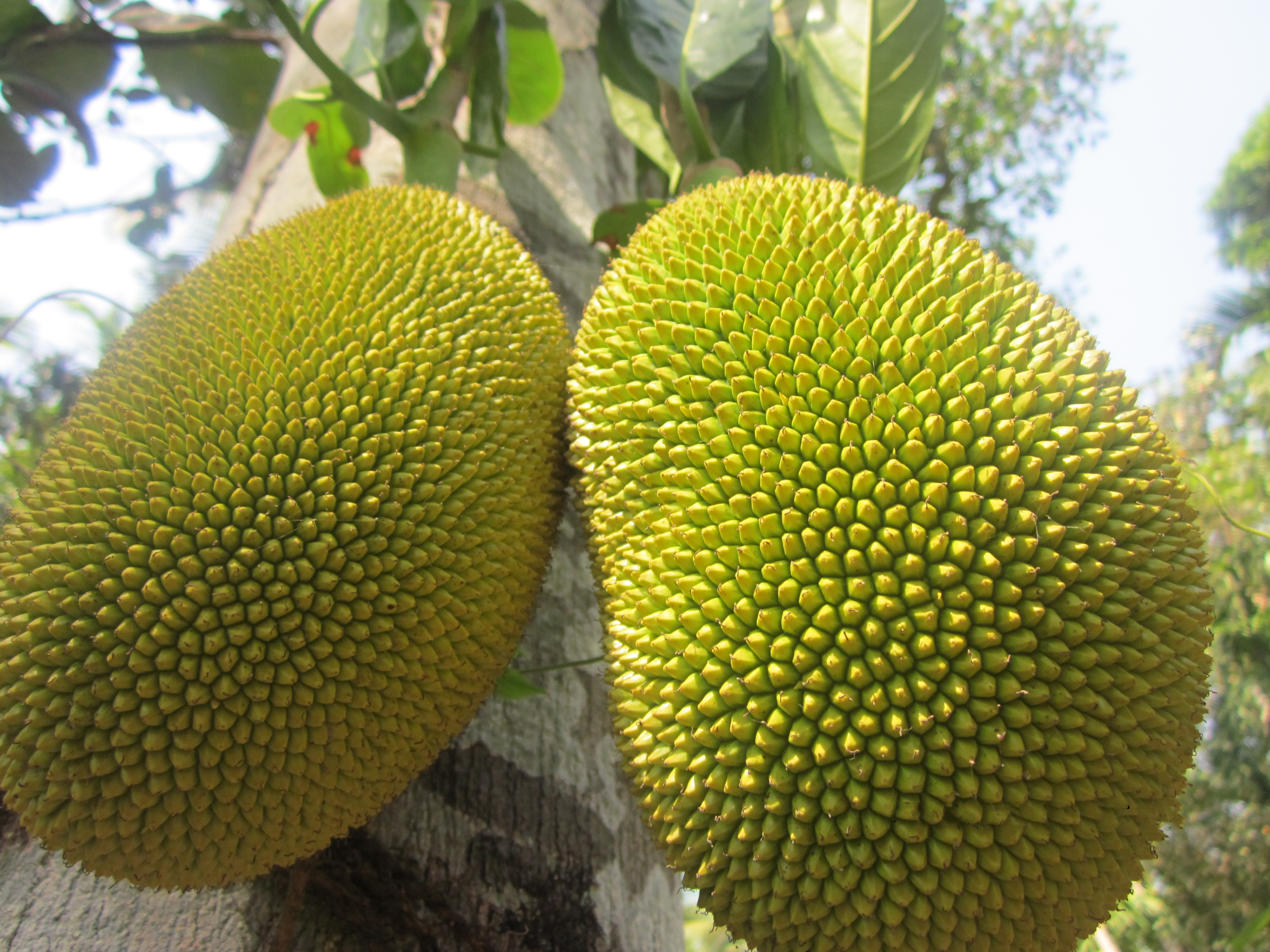
Jackfruit from Dharmadam

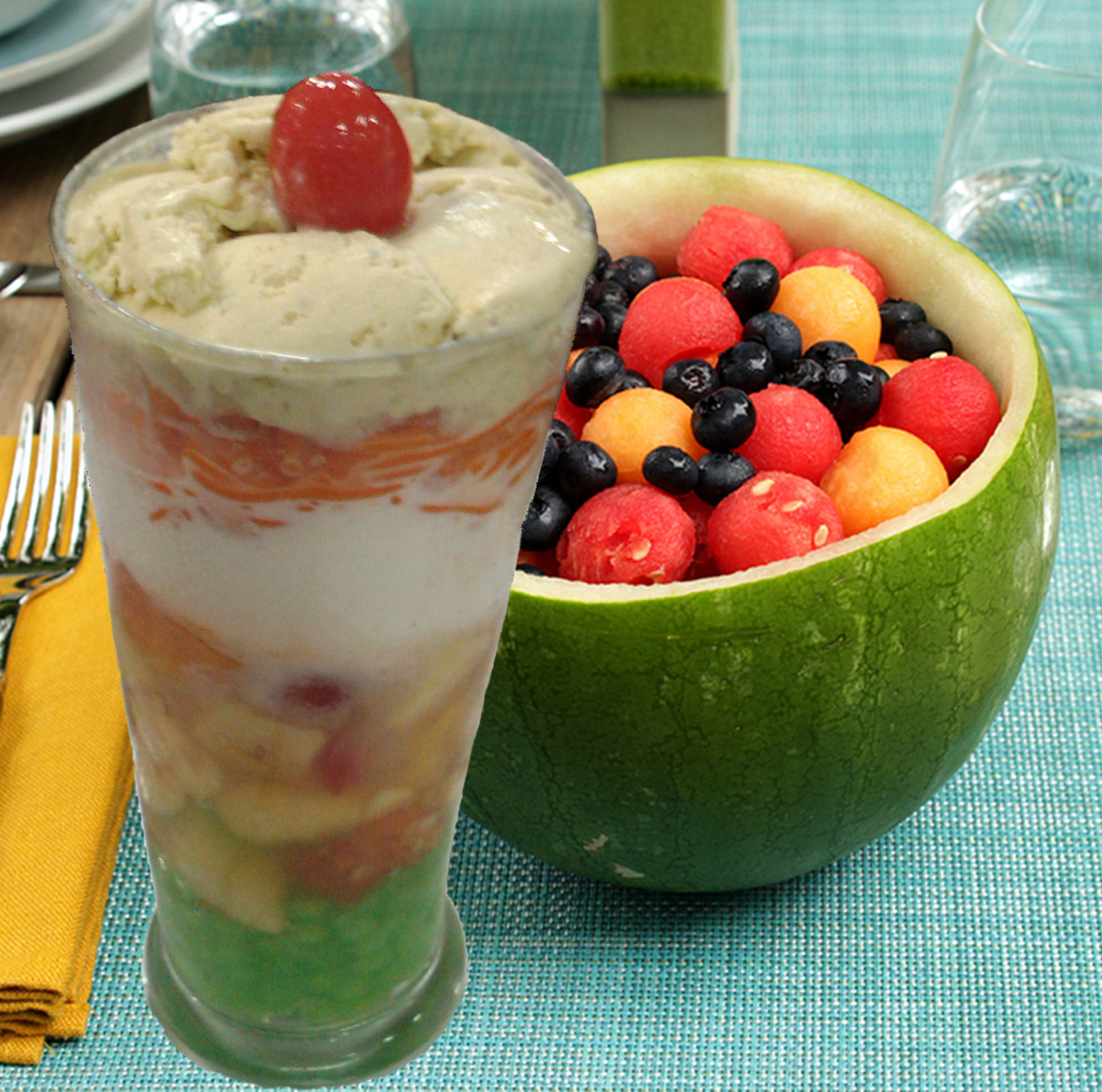
Thalassery cuisine

Thalassery is known for its biryani (in local dialect, biri-yaa-ni) Unlike other biriyani cuisines, Thalassery biryani uses Kaima/Jeerakasala rice instead of the usual basmati rice. Porridges such as mutaari kachiyatu (ragi porridge) are also popular.

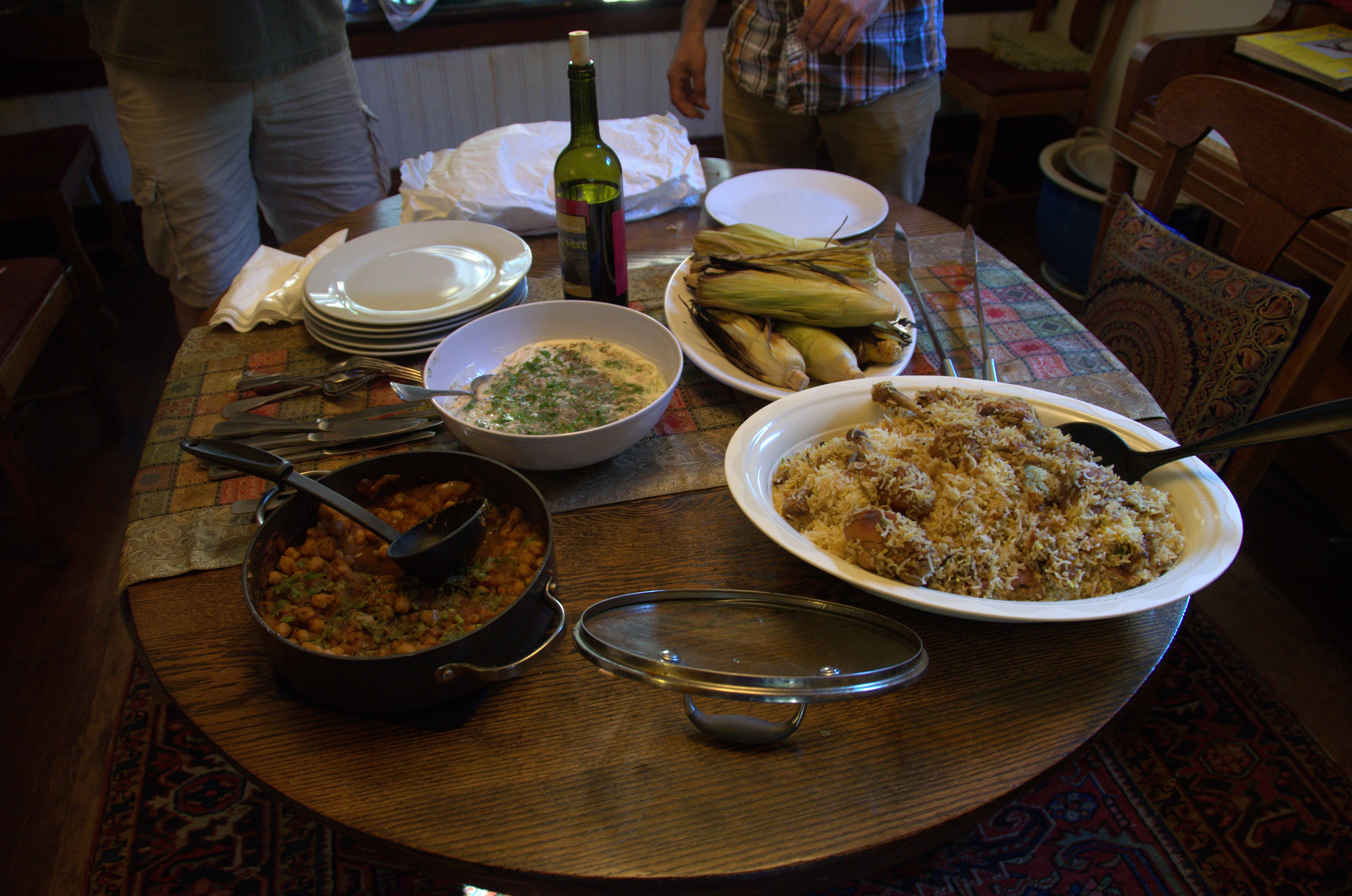
Thalassery biriyani

The spice trade from the Malabar coast which began around 1500 BC is still active.

== Cricket ==
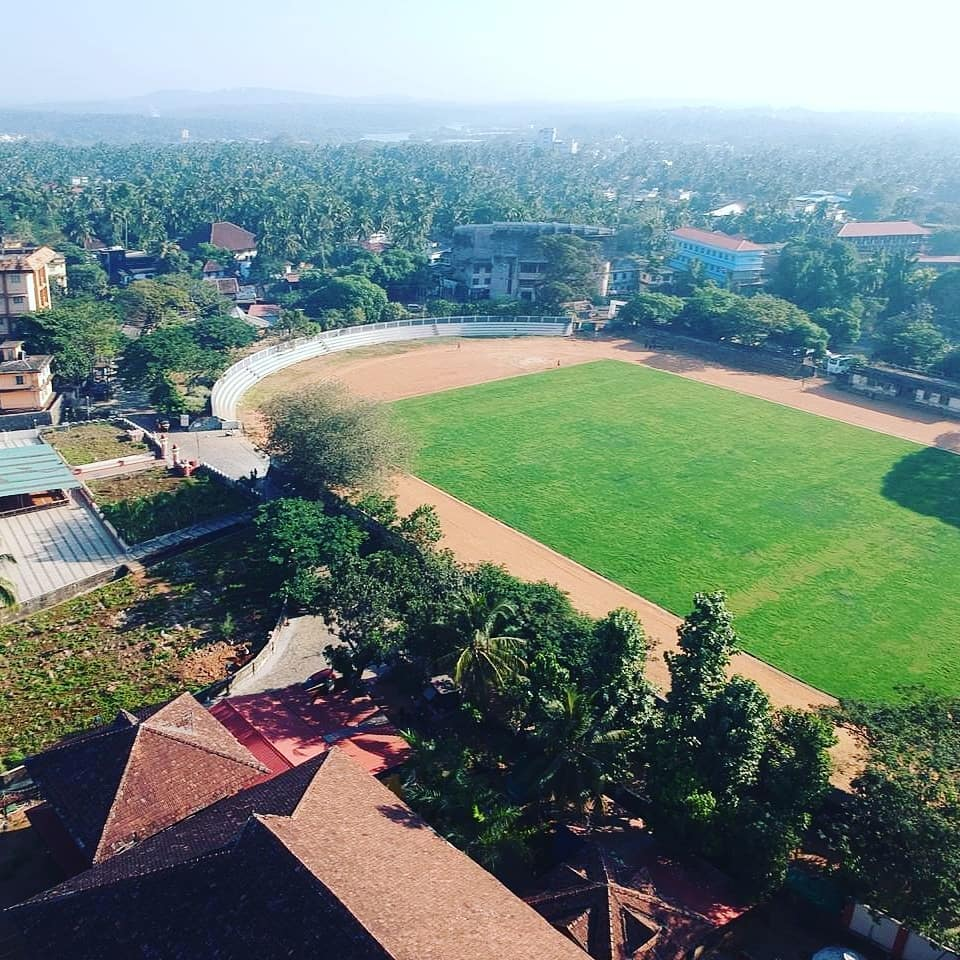
Thalassery Municipal Stadium

In 1800, Arthur Wellesley, 1st Duke of Wellington made Thalassery (then Tellicherry) his base. Wellesley and his colleagues played cricket in the town maidan, often watched by bystanders, who would help the English officers whenever they were short of players. They played were from the dhobi community and the fishermen who lived along the beach. In 1830, the Tellicherry Cricket Club (TCC) was formed. By the 1930s Thalassery had become a major cricket centre. Many teams used to visit the town for matches. The earliest record of a cricket match in Thalassery is a report in Malayala Manorama in 1890. It's about a match between Thalassery and the neighbouring town of Kannur.

Thalassery Stadium, located close to the sea, hosts Ranji Trophy cricket matches quite often. Wellesley is believed to have introduced this game in Kerala in the 18th century for British soldiers garrisoned in the Tellichery Fort. India's first cricket club, which was later named the Town Cricket Club, was formed in 1850 at Tellichery by Wellesley. The Tellichery Cricket ground was the hub of cricket activities during this period. An exhibition match was conducted in there to raise funds during the First World War.

== Education ==
The educational renaissance of Malabar started from Thalassery due to the influence of European missionaries. Government Brennen College, Thalassery, founded in 1862, is one of the oldest educational institutions in India.

Kannur University Thalassery Campus is located at Palayad, 6 km north of Thalassery. The Basel Evangelic Mission Parsi High school is an English Medium school (established 1856) in Malabar. Dr. Hermann Gundert was a tutor there. Kaikose Ruderasha, a Parsi, donated funds to build the institute with the assistance of German missionaries.

Other educational institutions include Sports Authority of India Centre, Nettur Technical Training Foundation, St Joseph's Higher Secondary School, Sacred Heart Girls High School, and Basel Evangelical Mission Parsi High School.

== Transport ==
Thalassery Railway Station operates under the Palakkad Railway Division of the Southern Railway. It is a Class 'A' railway station. It is on the Shoranur – Mangalore line. No direct line connects Thalasery to Mysore, although a feasibility study for such a route was funded in 2013.

The nearest airport is Kannur International Airport, located 24 km east from the town. Calicut International Airport 100 km, Mangalore International Airport 170 km and Cochin International Airport 235 km could be alternate choices.

Kanyakumari-Mumbai NH-66 passes through Thalassery. Kozhikode is 66 km from Thalassery. Mangalore is 150 km from Thalassery. Interstate highway, Thalassery-Coorg Road (SH-30) is a major road linking Kerala to Kodagu district of Karnataka State. Interstate buses ply on this route in a frequency of one in an hour. The hill stations Virajpet in Kodagu and Mananthavady in Wayanad are 82 km away from the town. Regular buses to Bengaluru, which is at a distance of 310 km from Thalassery, operate on a daily basis.

The Thalassery-Mahe bypass, a six-lane highway inaugurated by Prime Minister Narendra Modi in March 2024, significantly enhances connectivity between Muzhapilangad in Kannur district and Azhiyoor in Kozhikode district.

== Tourism ==
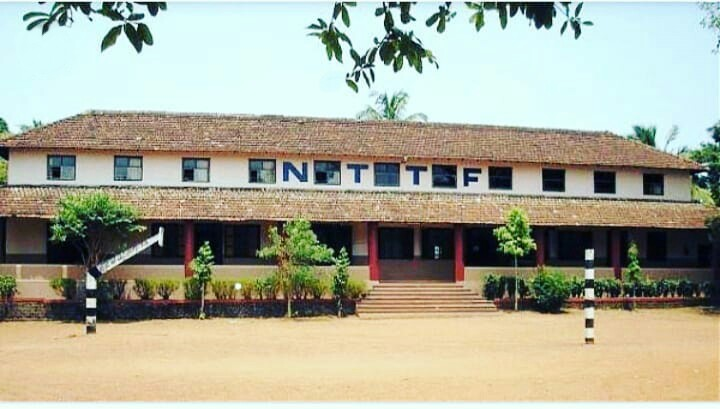
Nettur Technical Training Foundation (NTTF), established by the Christian missionaries of Switzerland

The Thalassery carnival, the beach fest in Muzhappilangad beach and Dharmadam beach are notable attractions. The area's four rivers (Anjarakkandi, Dharmadam, Koduvally and Mahe) around Thalassery town and other beaches in the area also attract visitors.

Muzhappilangad beach is a 5.5 km long beach where it is possible to drive vehicles. This beach was listed as one of the top 10 drive-in beaches in the world by a BBC survey.

It is an important center of Kalari Payattu and health tourism. Other visitors come to experience Theyyam and explore the area's history, such as Tellicherry Fort.

Thalassery Pier (Kadalpaalam), Overbury's Folly, Pazhassi Dam and Reservoir garden and Malayala Kala Gramam, New Mahe,(7 km from Thalassery) are other attractions. A shipwreck is visible near the Thalassery shore.

== Political violence ==
The area is an epicenter of political violence between the RSS and Communists. Communist Party of India (Marxist) (CPI(M)) and the Rashtriya Swayamsevak Sangh (RSS) have been fighting in this area for supremacy for the last 50 years. Clashes in 2008 left seven people dead, and many have been injured. The High Court of Kerala called this manslaughter a "compelling sport" and suggested permanent deployment of Central forces in the affected areas.

== Notable residents ==
- Veera Kerala Varma Pazhassi Raja
- Hermann Gundert, German missionary, scholar, and linguist
- William Logan
- Janaki Ammal
- Vainu Bappu
- Ayyathan Gopalan
- Ayyathan Janaki Ammal
- Sanjayan (Prof. Mannikoth Ramunni Nair)
- Oyyarathu Chandu Menon
- M. N. Vijayan
- Vengayil Kunhiraman Nayanar
- Moorkoth Ramunni
- Moorkoth Kumaran
- Vagbhatananda
- Keeleri Kunhikannan
- Anadhatheerthan
- K. Raghavan
- Pinarayi Vijayan
- V. Muraleedharan
- Kodiyeri Balakrishnan
- N. Prabhakaran
- V. P. Sathyan
- C. K. Vineeth
- Sreenivasan
- Eranholi Moosa (1940–2019), Mappilappattu singer
- Shaan Rahman
- Deepak Dev
- Vineeth Sreenivasan
- Dhyan Sreenivasan
- Sushin Shyam
- Chundangapoyil Rizwan
- Kakuzhi Kunjibappu Gurukkal
- Salman Nizar

== Climate ==
Thalassery experiences a tropical monsoon climate under the Köppen climate classification. The wet season starts in June as the southwest monsoon first hits the coastal Kerala and continues until the end of September. A brief pre-monsoon mango showers interval occurs sometime during April. Precipitation from the northeast monsoon sets in during the second half of October through November.

Climate data for Thalassery
Month	Jan	Feb	Mar	Apr	May	Jun	Jul	Aug	Sep	Oct	Nov	Dec	Year
Mean daily maximum °C (°F)	32.2 (90.0)	32.6 (90.7)	33.3 (91.9)	33.5 (92.3)	32.8 (91.0)	30.1 (86.2)	29 (84)	29.2 (84.6)	30.2 (86.4)	31 (88)	31.9 (89.4)	32.1 (89.8)	31.5 (88.7)
Mean daily minimum °C (°F)	22.9 (73.2)	23.8 (74.8)	25.5 (77.9)	26.3 (79.3)	26 (79)	24.4 (75.9)	23.7 (74.7)	23.9 (75.0)	24.2 (75.6)	24.2 (75.6)	24.1 (75.4)	22.8 (73.0)	24.3 (75.8)
Average rainfall mm (inches)	3 (0.1)	3 (0.1)	11 (0.4)	70 (2.8)	285 (11.2)	900 (35.4)	1,078 (42.4)	544 (21.4)	267 (10.5)	227 (8.9)	103 (4.1)	21 (0.8)	3,512 (138.1)
Source 1: WWO
Source 2: Climate-Data.org

== See also ==
- Culture of Thalassery
- Jagannath Temple, Thalassery
- Koorara
- Thiruvangad Sree Ramaswami Temple
- Kannur district

Preceded by Kottayam Province of Chirakkal Kingdom	Tellicherry, Madras Presidency, British India; 1 November 1866 according to the Madras Act 10 of 1865 (Amendment of the Improvements in Towns act 1850)	Succeeded by Thalassery taluk, Kerala state, India (States Reorganisation Act, 1956)
