= Chittur taluk =

Tehsil in Kerala, India

- Taluk
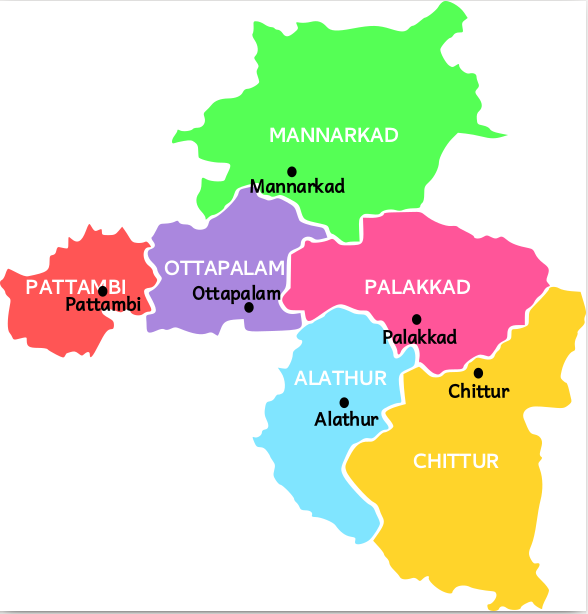
- Taluks in Palakkad district

- Location in Kerala, India Chittur taluk (India)
- Coordinates: 10.7005°N 76.7490°E
- Country: India
- State: Kerala
- District: Palakkad

Area
  - Total: 1,136.23 km^{2} (438.70 sq mi)

Population
  - Total: 437,738
  - Density: 385.255/km^{2} (997.805/sq mi)

Languages
  - Official: Malayalam, English
  - Minority: Tamil
- Time zone: UTC+5:30 (IST)
- PIN: 678101
- Telephone code: 04923
- Vehicle registration: KL-70
- Lok Sabha constituency: Alathur
- Vidhan Sabha constituency: Chittur

Chittur is one among the 6 taluks in Palakkad district of Indian state of Kerala. There are 30 revenue villages in chittur taluk. It is situated on the eastern side of Palakkad district.

== Constituent villages ==
- Ayiloor, Chittur, Elavanchery, Eruthempathy, Kairadi
- Koduvayoor-I, Koduvayur-II, Kollengode-1, Kollengode-2, Kozhinjampara
- Kozhipathy, Moolathara, Muthalamada-1, Muthalamada-2, Nallepilly
- Nelliyampathy, Nemmara, Ozhalapathy, Pallassana, Pattanchery
- Perumatty, Puthunagaram, Thathamangalam, Thekkedesom, Thiruvazhiyad
- Vadakarapathy, Vadavannur, Valiyavallampathy, Vallanghy and Vandithavalam

== Demographics ==
As of 2011 Census, Chittur taluk had total population of 437,738 people, of which 215,309 are males and 222,429 are females. The average sex ratio is 1033 females per 1000 males is higher than national average (943 females per 100 males). Population in the age group 0-6 was 40,994 (9.4% of total population). Chittur had overall literacy of 83.19% lower than kerala state average of 94.00%: male literacy was 89.17% and female literacy was 77.44%.

=== Religions ===
Chittur taluk constitutes majority of Hindus followed by Muslims, Christians and other minorities.

Religions in Chittur subdistrict
1. Hinduism (80.5%)
2. Islam (13.8%)
3. Christianity (6.08%)
4. Not stated (0.29%)
5. Sikh (0.01%)
6. Buddhism (0.01%)
7. Others (0.01%)

=== Languages ===
Languages in Chittur taluk
Language	Speakers
Malayalam	79.43%
Tamil	18.02%
Telugu	1.86%
Others	0.69%
Distribution of languages Source: 2011 Census
