= Perumatty (disambiguation) =

Perumatty may refer to

- Perumatty, a village in Palakkad district, state of Kerala, India
- Perumatty (gram panchayat), a gram panchayat that serves the above village and others
