= Vandithavalam =

- Village
- Location in Kerala, India Vandithavalam (India)
- Coordinates: 10°39′0″N 76°45′30″E
- Country: India
- State: Kerala
- District: Palakkad

Area
  - Total: 15.34 km^{2} (5.92 sq mi)

Population (2011)
  - Total: 12,531
  - Density: 816.9/km^{2} (2,116/sq mi)

Languages
  - Official: Malayalam, English
- Time zone: UTC+5:30 (IST)
- PIN: 678534
- Vehicle registration: KL-70
- Nearest city: Chittur (6 km)
- Lok Sabha constituency: Alathur
- Vidhan Sabha constituency: Chittur

Vandithavalam is a village in the Palakkad district, state of Kerala, India. It is among the villages administered by the Perumatty Gram Panchayat.

Vandithavalam was a village in the erstwhile Cochin state, but was included in the Palakkad district at the time of the Kerala State formation.

Vandithavalam lies in the foothills of the Western Ghats and is situated near the Parambikulam Wildlife Sanctuary. Vandithavalam is nourished by the Bharathapuzha River and consists of fertile agricultural land.

Vandithavalam is situated in the Palghat Gap, thus historically transport from neighbouring Tamil Nadu is constant. Vandithavalam served as a resting point for the travellers and thus derived the name Vandithavalam, with Vandi meaning vehicle and Thavalam referring to a centre/place in Malayalam.

Vandithavalam is situated 17 Km away from the Palakkad City and 30 Km away from Pollachi town.

== Demographics ==
As of 2011 India census, Vandithavalam had a population of 12,531 with 6,302 males and 6229 females.
