= Moolathara =

- village
- Location in Kerala, India Moolathara (India)
- Coordinates: 10°40′30″N 76°48′0″E
- Country: India
- State: Kerala
- District: Palakkad

Population (2011)
  - Total: 9,764

Languages
  - Official: Malayalam, English
- Time zone: UTC+5:30 (IST)
- PIN: 6XXXXX
- Vehicle registration: KL-

Moolathara is a village in the Palakkad district, state of Kerala, India. It is among the villages administered by the Perumatty Gram Panchayat.

== Demographics ==
As of 2011 India census, Moolathara has a population of 9,764, with 4,832 males and 4,932 females.
