= Nagalassery =

- Village
- Location in Kerala, India Nagalassery (India)
- Coordinates: 10°45′12″N 76°8′50″E
- Country: India
- State: Kerala
- District: Palakkad

Population (2011)
  - Total: 27,606

Languages
  - Official: Malayalam, English
- Time zone: UTC+5:30 (IST)
- PIN: 6XXXXX
- Vehicle registration: KL-

Nagalassery is a village and gram panchayat in Palakkad district in the state of Kerala, India.

== Demographics ==
As of the 2011 Indian census, Nagalassery had a population of 27,606 with 13,168 males and 14,438 females.
