= Elavancherry =

Elavanchery
- village
- Nicknames: Land of the swaying Palm trees, 11cherry
- Location in Kerala, India Elavanchery (India)
- Coordinates: 10°36′10″N 76°38′40″E
- Country: India
- State: Kerala
- District: Palakkad

Population (2011)
  - Total: 17,940

Languages
  - Official: Malayalam, English
  - Minority: Tamil
- Time zone: UTC+5:30 (IST)
- PIN: 678508
- Vehicle registration: KL-70

Elavanchery is a village and gram panchayat near Kollengode Town in Palakkad district, Kerala, India. It is situated on the foothills of Nelliyampathy mountain ranges, a part of the Western Ghats. The topography of Elevanchery is characterised by large areas of lush green paddy fields dotted with tall palm trees and breathtakingly beautiful rolling hills on the backdrop. This makes it an ideal location for shooting films and advertisements adding to the "laid back Kerala vibe". Elevanchery is also accredited with having the Highest per capita of Government employees in the whole of Kerala. Around 50% of the households has at least one member serving the State of Kerala. Thiruvananthapuram MP and Former UN Under Secretary-General Shashi Tharoor hails from this village.

== Demographics ==
As of 2011 India census, Elavancherry had a population of 17,940 with 8,741 males and 9,199 females. Malayalam is the most widely spoken language in the region followed by Tamil. Hindus constitute around 80% of the entire population. Muslims and Christians are also found in parts of Elevanchery, as elsewhere in the state.
