= Chittur-Thathamangalam =

- Municipality
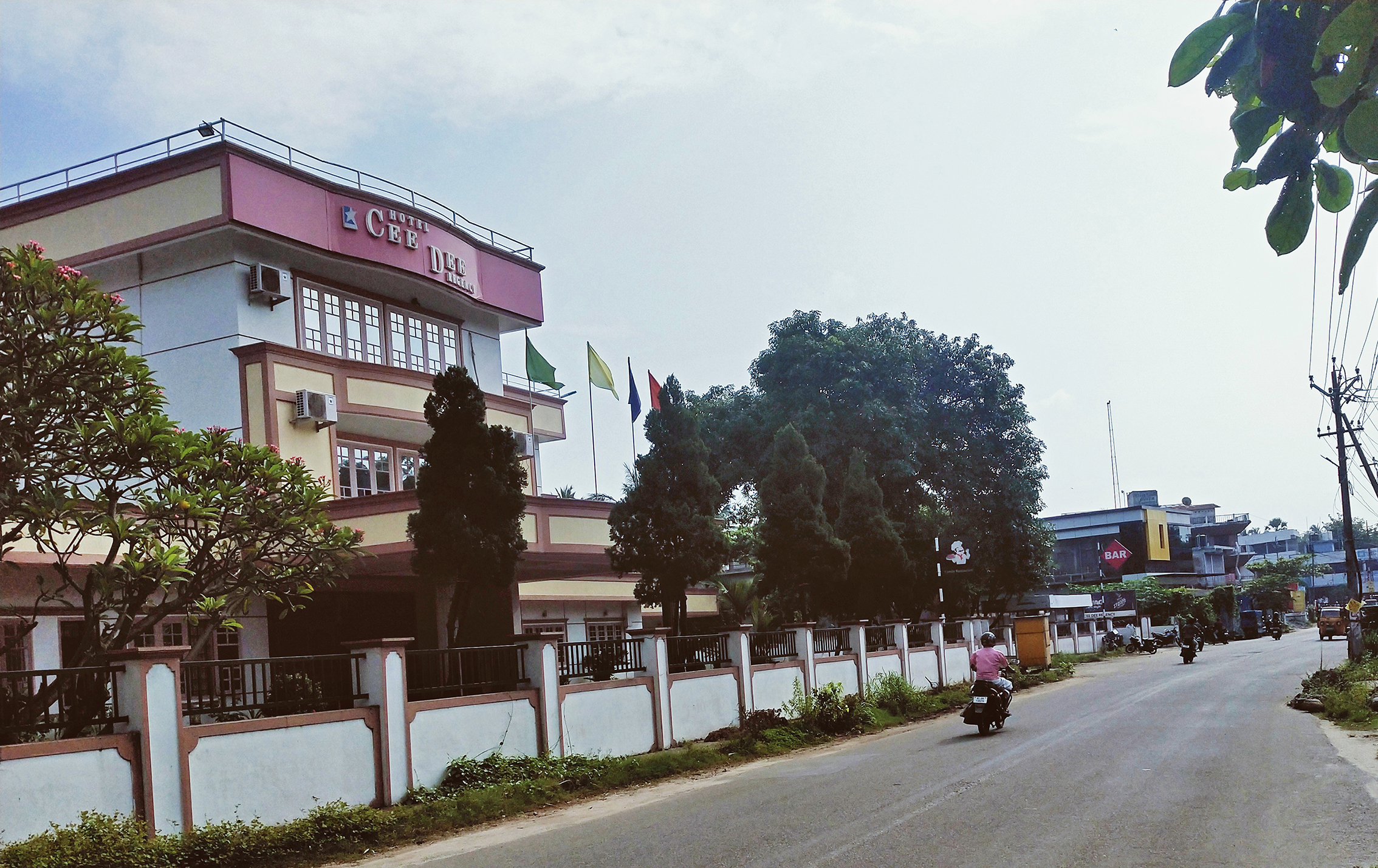
- Anikode, Chittur

- Location in Kerala, India Chittur-Thathamangalam (India)
- Coordinates: 10.70°N 76.75°E
- Country: India
- State: Kerala
- District: Palakkad

Government
  - Body: Municipality

Area
  - Total: 14.71 km^{2} (5.68 sq mi)
- Elevation: 131 m (430 ft)

Population (2011)
  - Total: 32,298
  - Density: 2,196/km^{2} (5,687/sq mi)

Languages
  - Official: Malayalam, English
- Time zone: UTC+5:30 (IST)
- PIN: 6781xx
- Vehicle registration: KL-70
- Parliament constituency: Alathur
- Assembly constituency: Chittur

Chittur-Thathamangalam is a town and municipality in the Palakkad district of Kerala State, India. It is the headquarters of Chittur taluk, 13 km (8.1 mi) southeast of Palakkad, on the banks of the Kannadipuzha, a major headstream of the Bharathapuzha, the second-longest river in Kerala. A mini civil station is also located here, which provides government-related services. It consists of two areas, Chittur and Thathamangalam, which together form the municipality.

== Temples ==
Chittur-Thathamangalam town consists of the famous Chittur Bhagavathi temple, which is under the Cochin Devaswom board. The other major temples are the Pazhayannur Bhagavathi temple, Durga temple, and Sivakshethram (in Lankeswaram agraharam).

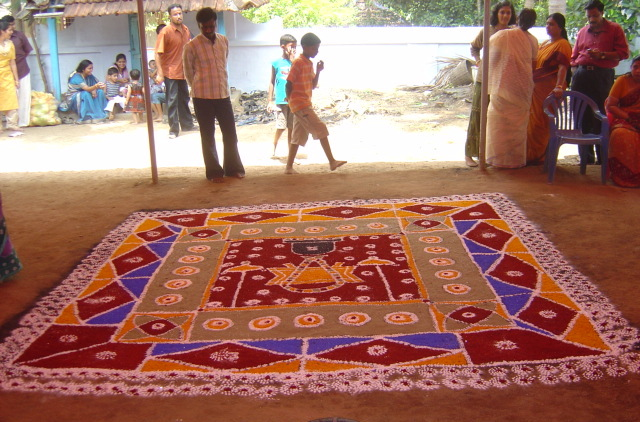
Andayil temple

== Economy and society ==
Agriculture is the main occupation of the district's people. The town is home to some of the major Menon tharavads of Kerala. There are also many agraharams (communities of Iyers) and Moothan communities.

== History ==
The Sokanashini river flows through Chittur, and it is on the banks of this river that Thunjathu Ramanujan Ezuthachan, the father of the Malayalam language, spent his last days. His final resting place is famous for Vidyarambham celebrations, where young children are initiated into the world of words and knowledge.

Thathamangalam is sometimes mentioned in history books and maps as Tattamungalum.

Chittur, Thathamangalam and nearby towns are also mentioned in "Memoir of the Survey of Travancore and Cochin 1816-1820", and in this book the spelling used is "Tattamungalum".

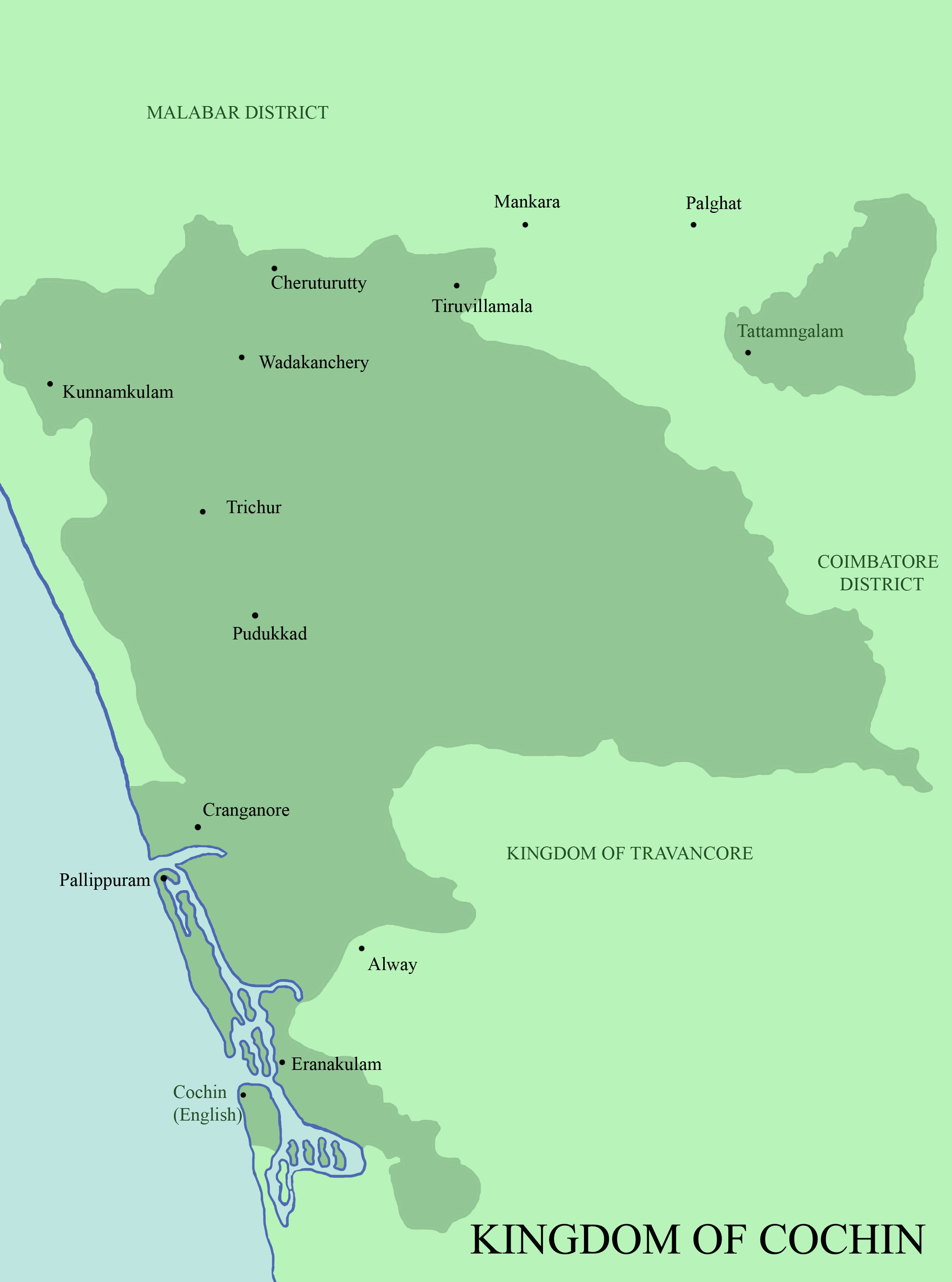
An old map of the Kingdom of Kochi showing the Thathamangalam and Chittur areas

== Festivals ==
Music is a part of the lifestyle of the people here, with the Government College training students towards higher degrees in music. Kongan Pada is the main festival of Chittur, and it is celebrated in the month of March. Sooranporu, Niramala, and Ayyappan Vilakku are also celebrated here. Others include Onam, Pongal, Vishu, Deepavali and Navarathri. At the time of Vishu, Vishu Vela a.k.a Karivela is also celebrated. There are music concerts in Chittur Kavu at the time of Navarathri and Konganpada. Other than these, there is an important festival in Lankeswaram village, called Ardra Dharsanam (Thiruvathira Radholsavam), at the end of December or first of January month every year.

== Demographics ==
As of 2011 India census, Chittur-Thathamangalam had a population of 32,298.

Chittur-Thathamangalam has an average literacy rate of 79%, higher than the national average of 59.5%; with male literacy of 84% and female literacy of 74%. 9% of the population is under 6 years of age. Chittur is sometimes called as Kerala's "nellara" along with Alappuzha, meaning the rice bowl.

== Transportation ==
Chittur-Thathamangalam town connects to other parts of India through Palakkad city. National Highway 544 connects to Coimbatore and Bangalore. Other parts of Kerala are accessed through National Highway 66 going through Thrissur. The nearest major railway station is Palakkad. The nearest airport is Coimbatore.

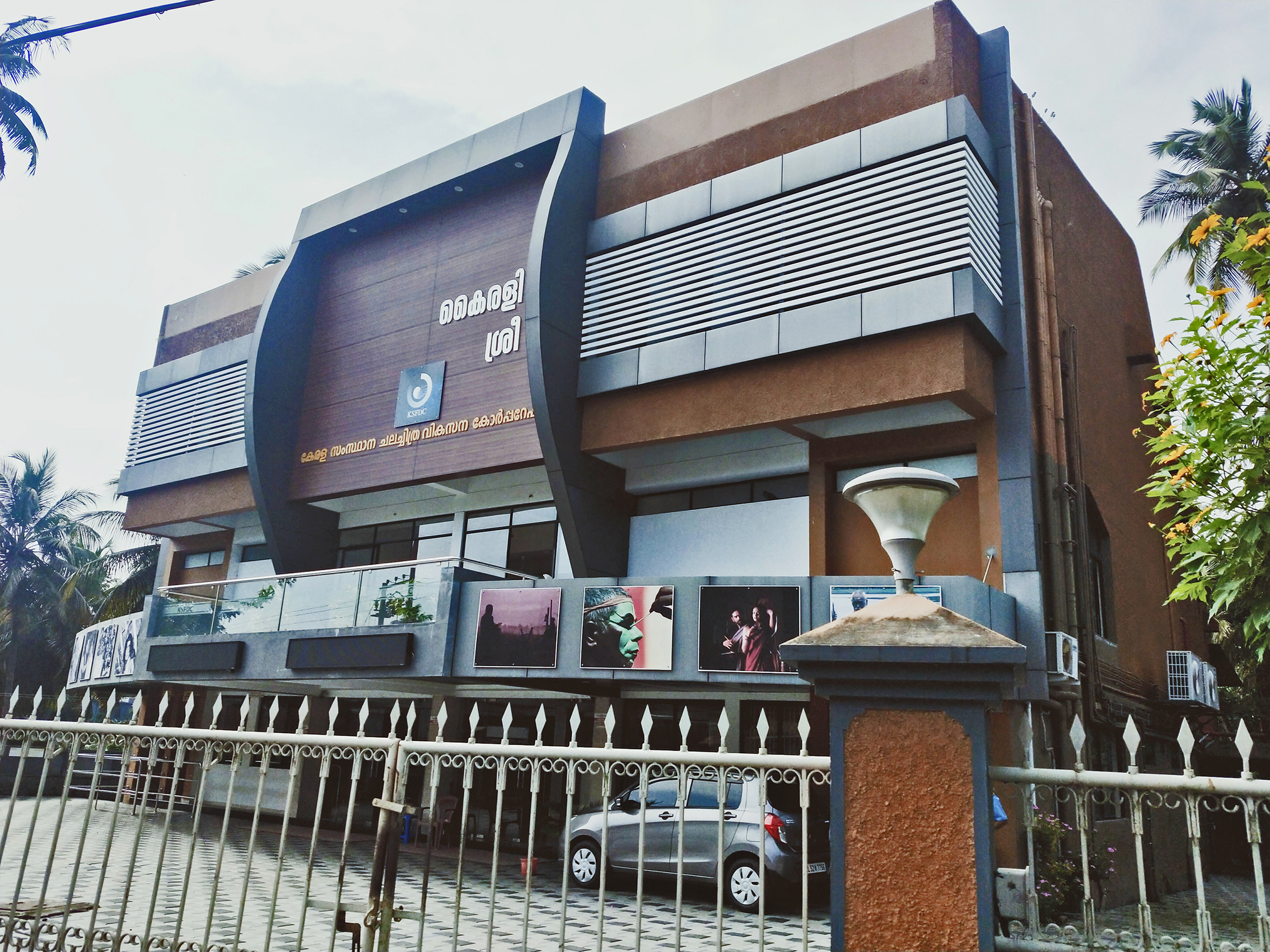
Kairali & Sree theatre, Chittur

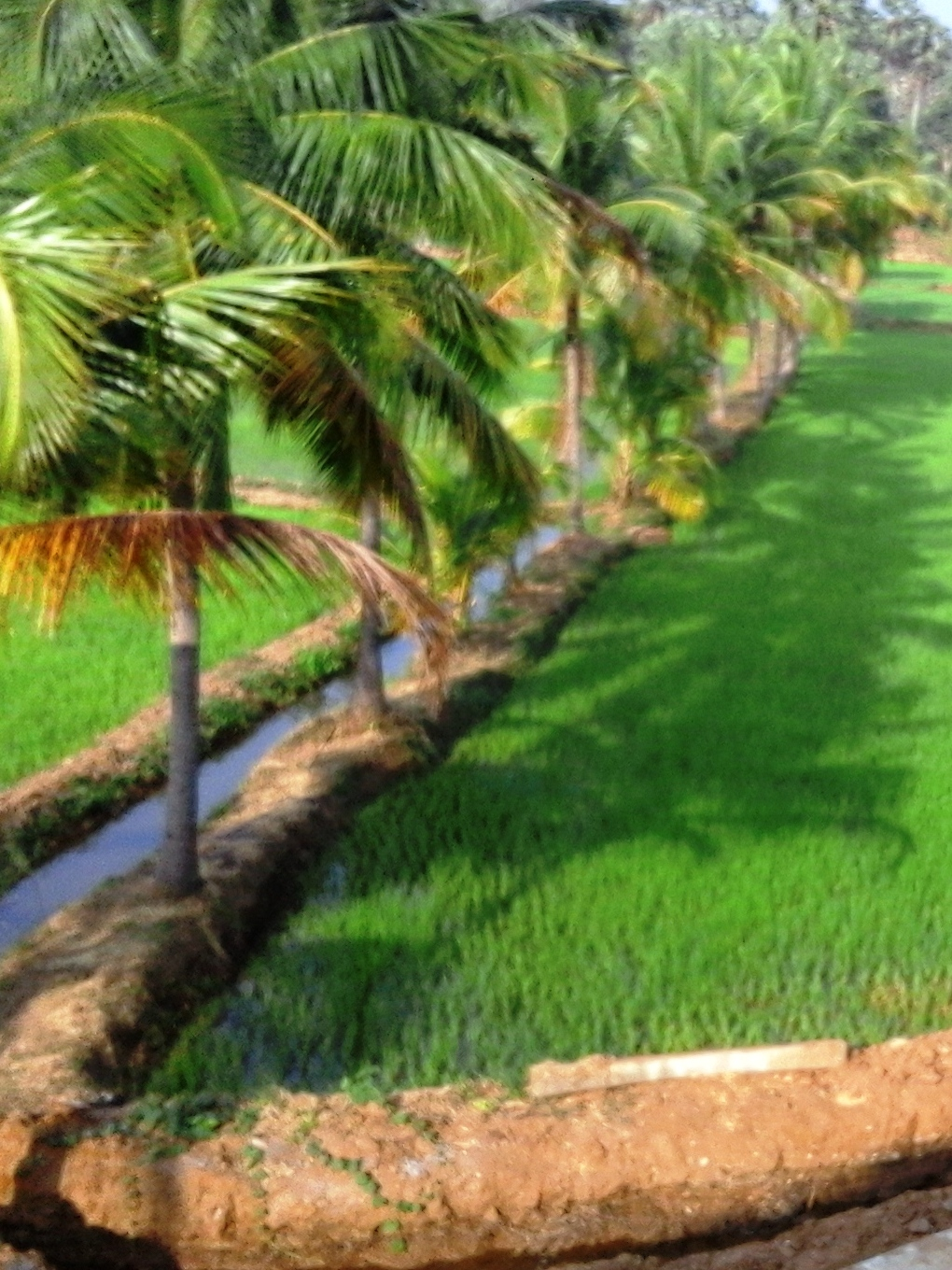
Puthunagaram

== Chittur Taluk ==
The headquarters of Chittur Taluk, one of the six taluks of Palakkad district, is here. The present MLA of Chittur Assembly constituency is Adv. Sumesh Achuthan of INC.
