= Perumatty Gram Panchayat =

Perumatty is a gram panchayat in the Palakkad district, state of Kerala, India. Perumatty is the first Gramapanchayat in Kerala to run entirely on solar energy. It is a local government organisation that serves the villages of Perumatty, Moolathara and Vandithavalam.
