= Perumatty =

- village
- Country: India
- State: Kerala
- District: Palakkad

Population (2011)
  - Total: 8,150

Languages
  - Official: Malayalam, English
- Time zone: UTC+5:30 (IST)
- PIN: 6XXXXX
- Vehicle registration: KL-

Perumatty is a village in the Palakkad district, state of Kerala, India. It is among the villages administered by Perumatty gram panchayat.

== Demographics ==
As of 2011 India census, Perumatty had a population of 8,150 with 3,976 males and 4,174 females. Agriculture & Toddy tapping is the main revenue for the people in this panchayath. This panchayath is the first & leader in experimenting Hi-tech Agri techniques in Kerala State.Farmers society to promote Precision farming & various Agri related activities are conducted in this panchyath

== Main Town ==
Vandithavalm Junction is in the main Town of this Panchayath

== Educational institutions ==
Karuna Medical college & Hospital

Government HSS Kannimari

Government UP Nellimedu

Government HS Meenakshipuram
