= Palakkad district =

District in Kerala, India

Palakkad District
- District
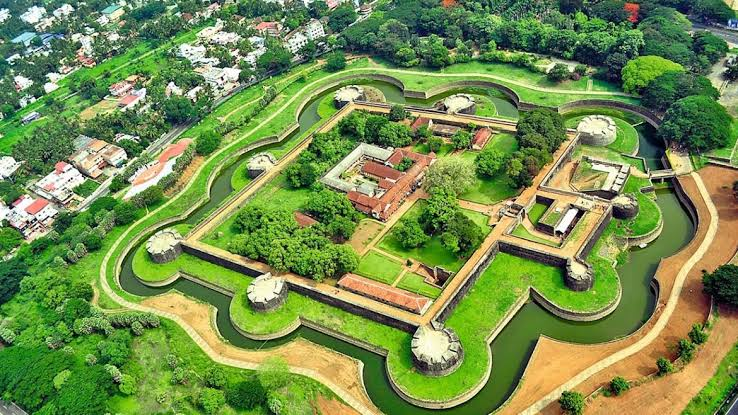
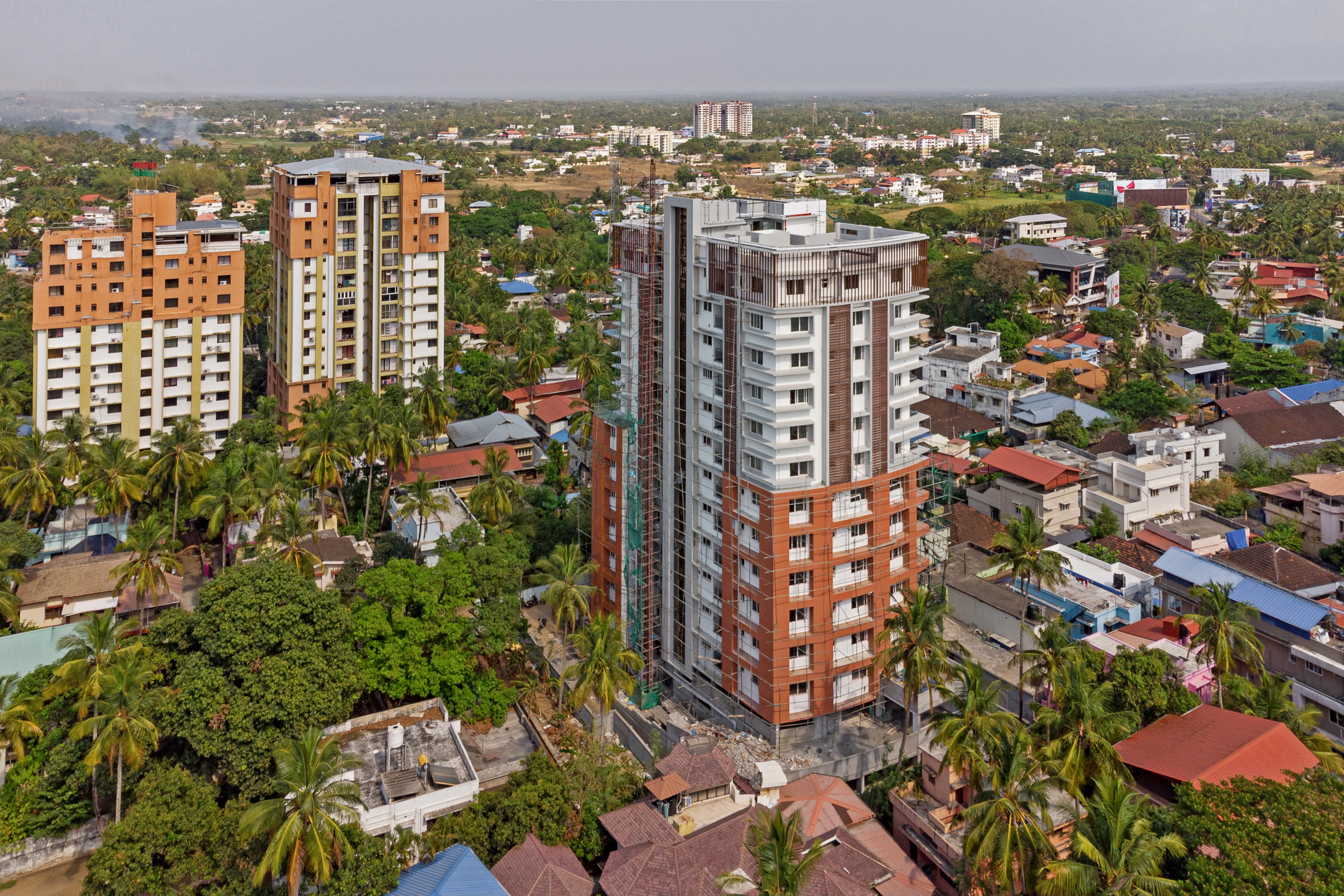
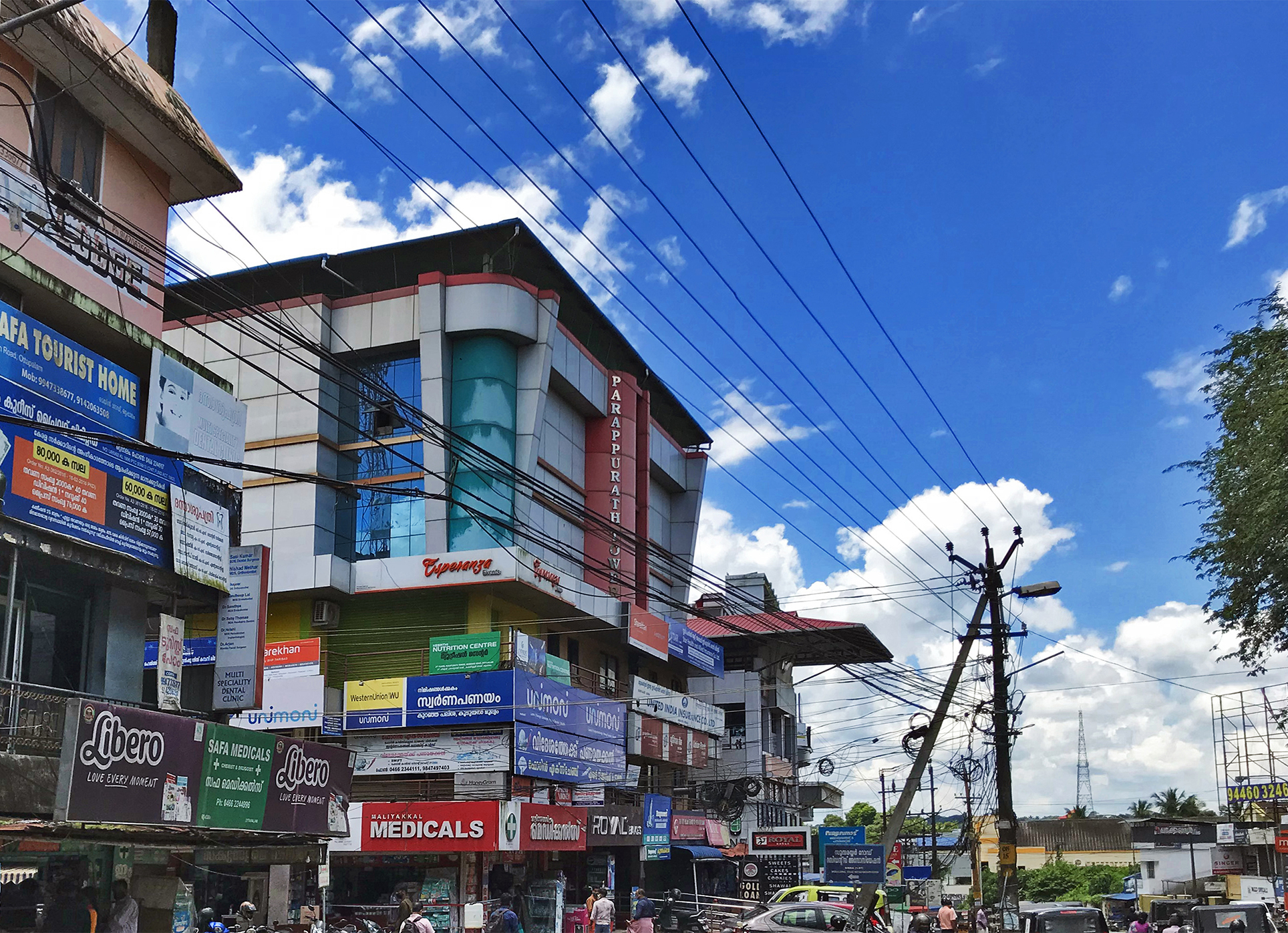
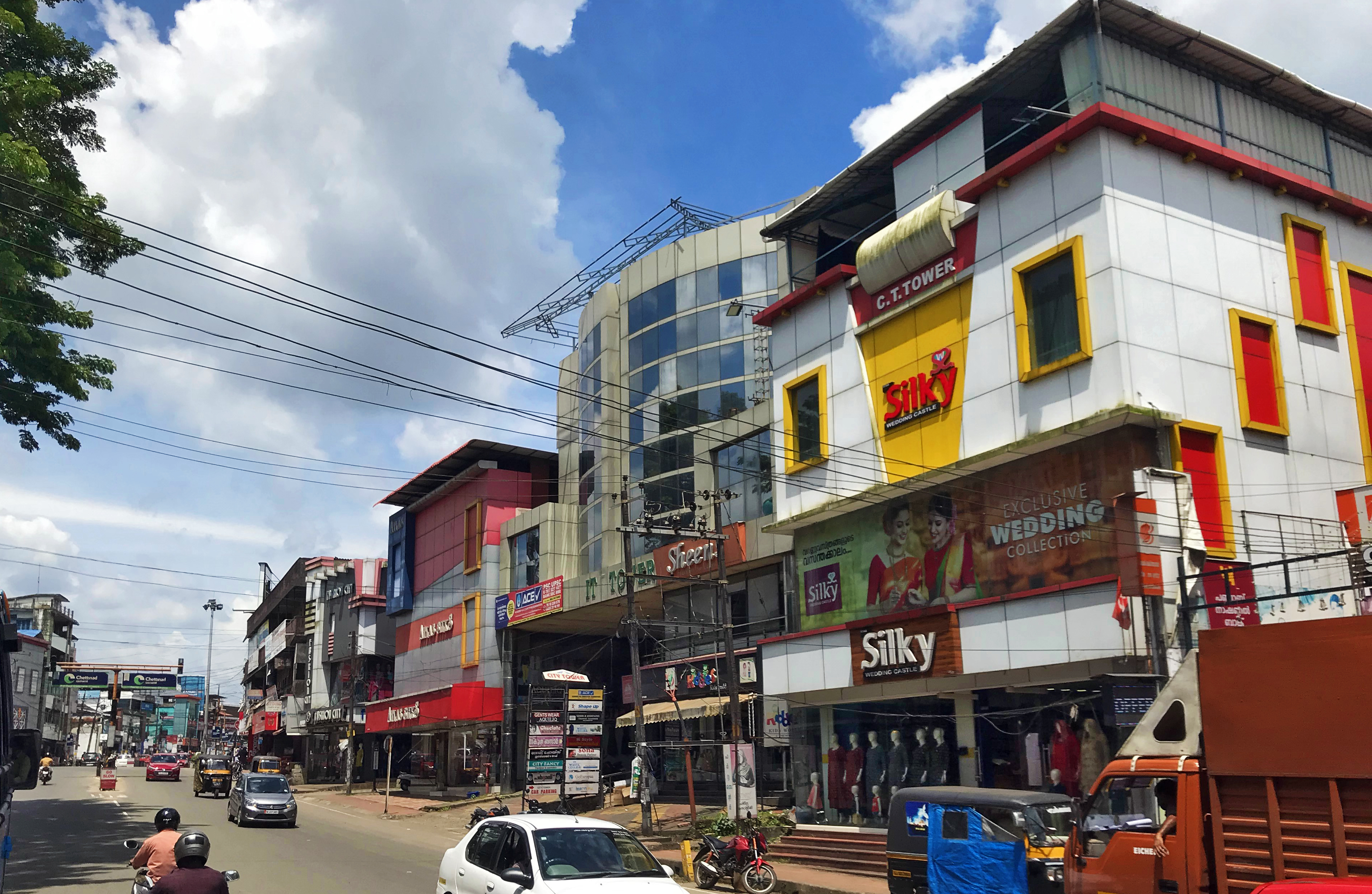
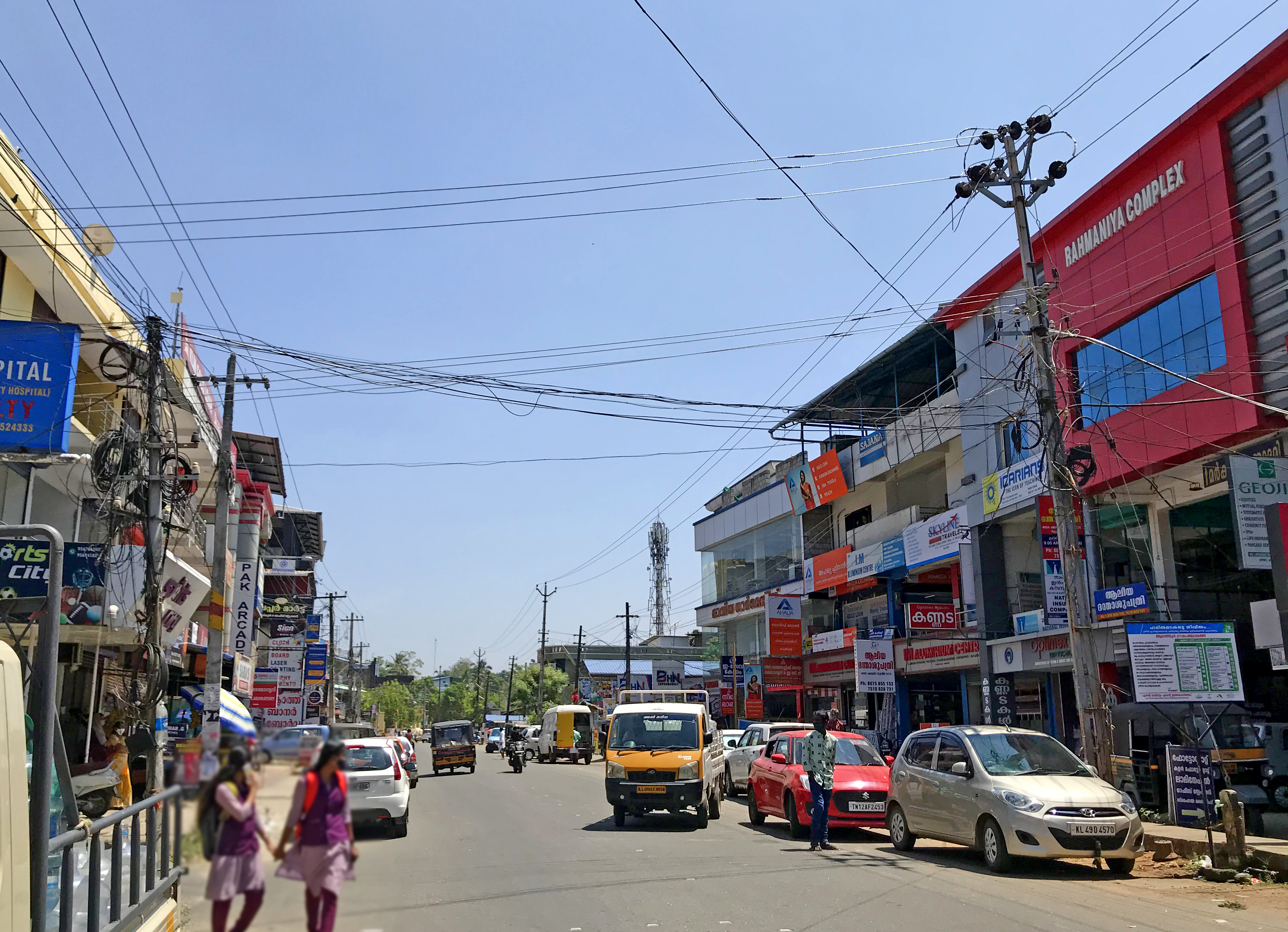
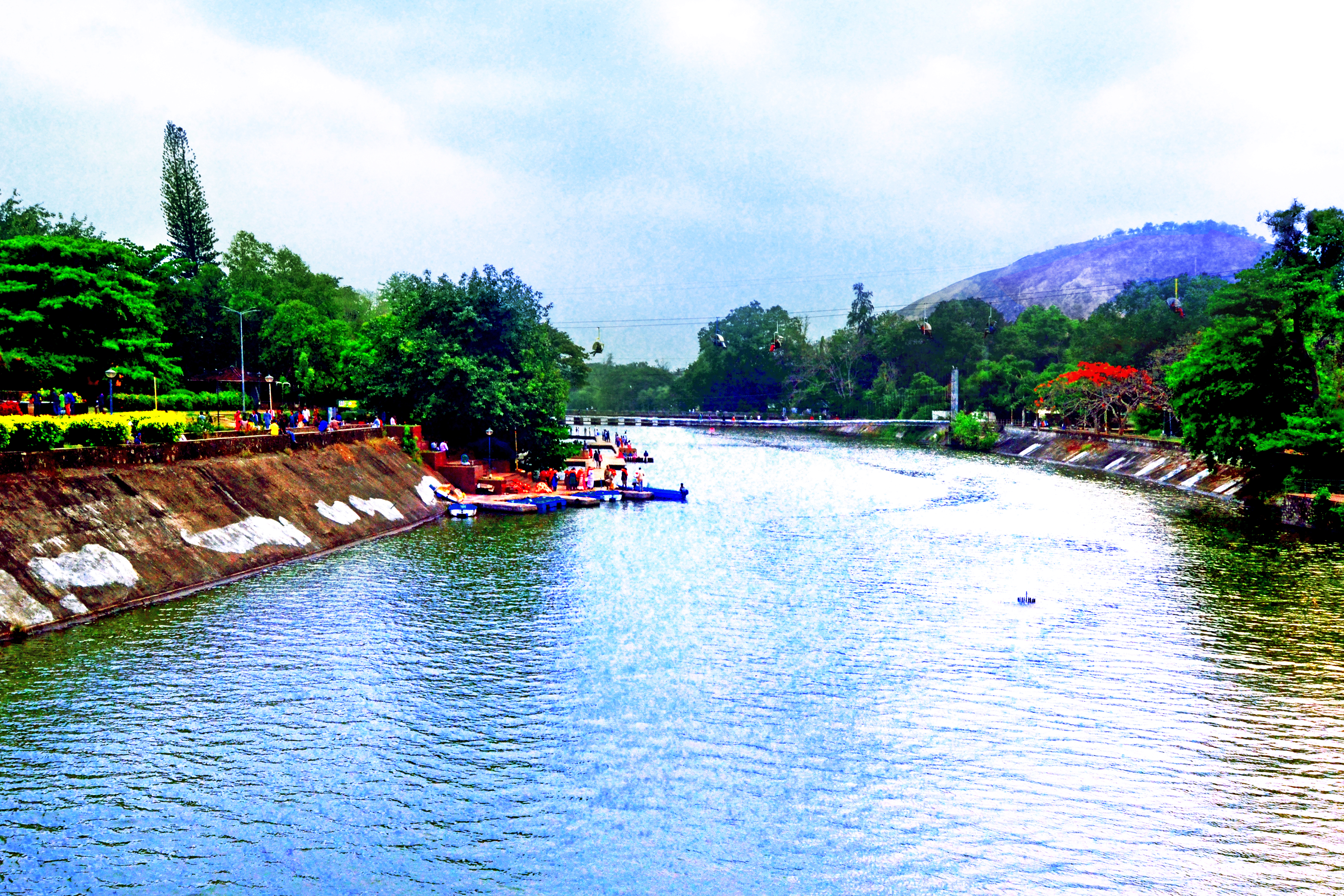
- Clockwise from top: Palakkad Fort, Ottapalam town, Alathur town, Malampuzha Dam Water Canal, Pattambi town, Palakkad city
- Nickname: The Granary of Kerala
- Location in Kerala
- Palakkad district
- Coordinates: 10.775°N 76.651°E
- Country: India
- State: Kerala
- Region: South Malabar
- Established: 1957
- Founder: -
- Named for: Pala Tree
- Headquarters: Palakkad

Government
  - Type: District administration
  - Body: District Collectrate
  - District Collector: K Sudheer IAS
  - District Police Chief: Ajit Kumar IPS
  - DFO: K Sreenivas , IFS

Area
  - Total: 4,482 km^{2} (1,731 sq mi)
  - Rank: 2nd
- Elevation: 4,000 m (13,000 ft)
- Highest elevation (Anginda peak): 2,383 m (7,818 ft)

Population (2018)
  - Total: 2,952,254
  - Rank: 5
  - Density: 659/km^{2} (1,710/sq mi)

Languages
  - Official: Malayalam, English

Religions
  - Religion (2011): 66.8% Hinduism; 28.9% Islam; 4.1% Christianity; 0.2% Others
- Time zone: UTC+5:30 (IST)
- ISO 3166 code: IN-KL-PKD
- Vehicle registration: KL-09 Palakkad, KL-49 Alathur, KL-50 Mannarkkad, KL-51 Ottappalam, KL-52 Pattambi, KL-70 Chittur-Thathamangalam
- HDI (2005): ▲0.761 ( High)
- Literacy: 89.31%
- Website: www.palakkad.nic.in

Palakkad district (Malayalam: [pɐːlɐkːɐːɖɨ̆]) is one of the 14 districts in the Indian state of Kerala. It was carved out of the southeastern region of the former Malabar District of Madras State on 1 January 1957. It is located at the central region of Kerala and is the second largest district in the state after Idukki. The town of Palakkad is the district headquarters. Palakkad is bordered on the northwest by the Malappuram district, on the southwest by the Thrissur district, on the northeast by Nilgiris district, and on the east by Coimbatore district of Tamil Nadu. The district is nicknamed "The granary of Kerala". Palakkad is the gateway to Kerala due to the presence of the Palakkad Gap, in the Western Ghats. The 2,383 m high Anginda peak, which is situated in the border of Palakkad district, Nilgiris district, and Malappuram district, in Silent Valley National Park, is the highest point of elevation in Palakkad district. Palakkad town is about 347 kilometres (216 mi) northeast of the state capital, Thiruvananthapuram.

The total area of the district is 4,480 km^{2} (1,730 sq mi) which is 11.5% of the state's area which makes it the second largest district of Kerala. Out of the total area of 4,480 km^{2} (1,730 sq mi), about 1,360 km^{2} (530 sq mi) of land is covered by forests. Most parts of the district fall in the midland region (elevation 75–250 m or 246–820 ft), except the Nelliampathy-Parambikulam area in the Chittur taluk in the south and Attappadi-Malampuzha area in the north, which are hilly and fall in the highland region (elevation > 250 m or 820 ft). Attappadi valley of Palakkad district, along with the Chaliyar valley of the neighbouring Nilambur region (Eastern Eranad region) in Malappuram district, is known for natural Gold fields, which is also seen in other parts of Nilgiri Biosphere Reserve.

The climate is pleasant for most parts of the year, the exception is the summer months. There is sufficient rainfall and it receives more rainfall than the extreme southern districts of Kerala. The district has many small and medium rivers, which are tributaries of the Bharathapuzha River. A number of dams have been built across these rivers, the largest being the Malampuzha dam. The largest in volume capacity is the Parambikulam Dam Bhavani River, which is a tributary of Kaveri River, also flows through the district. Kadalundi River has its origin in Silent Valley National Park. The Chalakudy River also flows through district.

Palakkad district have total number of seven municipalities.The largest city in the district is the Palakkad municipality. The municipalities in the district are Palakkad city, Ottapalam, Shornur, Chittur-Tattamangalam, Pattambi, Cherpulassery and Mannarkkad.Other major towns of the district are Alathur,Kollengode, Vadakkanchery,Nenmara,Koduvayur and Kozhinjamapara Out of the total Palakkad District population for 2011 Census of India, 24.09 percent lives in urban regions of district. In total 676,810 people lives in urban areas of which males are 328,012 and females are 348,798. Sex Ratio in urban region of Palakkad District is 1063 as per 2011 Census of India data. Similarly child sex ratio in Palakkad District was 959 in 2011 census. Child population (0–6) in urban region was 70,405 of which males and females were 35,933 and 34,472. This child population figure of Palakkad district is 10.95% of total urban population.

== Etymology ==
In earlier times, Palakkad was also known as Palakkattussery. Many concluded that Palakkad is derived from 'Pala', an indigenous tree which once densely occupied the land; and hence Palakkad or "the forest of Pala trees". Some believe, connecting the ancient Jain Temple in the town, that the sacred language Pali gave the name. In 1757, to check the invasion of the Zamorin of Calicut, the Palakkad Raja sought the help of Hyder Ali of Mysore. Later his son Tipu sultan became the ruler.

Before the Indian Independence, present-day Kerala state was scattered in South Canara, Malabar District of British India, and two princely states namely Cochin and Travancore. The first All-Kerala conference of Indian National Congress was held in 1921 at Ottapalam on the banks of the river Bharathappuzha, which also later demanded a separate state for the Malayalam-speaking regions in future Independent India. Kerala Pradesh Congress Committee was formed in that conference. Before that, Malabar District, Cochin, and Travancore had separate Congress committees. Ottapalam is located right in the middle of Kerala state.

== History ==
The region around Coimbatore was ruled by the Cheras during Sangam period between c. first and the fourth centuries CE and it served as the eastern entrance to the Palakkad Gap, the principal trade route between the Malabar Coast and Tamil Nadu. Palakkad city, which lies on the northern bank of the River Bharathappuzha, was ruled by the Palakkad Rajas (Tarur Swaroopam). Palakkad Raja had the right over the Taluks of Palakkad, Alathur, and Chittur. The original headquarters of Palakkad Rajas were at Athavanad, Tirur Taluk, in present-day Malappuram district. It is said that their lands at Athavanad area were given to the Azhvanchery Thamprakkal and the Palakkad-Chittur areas were bought from them instead.

Pattambi-Ottapalam Taluk were ruled by the Zamorin of Calicut, and Mannarkkad Taluk was a part of the Kingdom of Valluvanad, which was also later annexed by the Zamorin. Pattambi – Ottapalam areas were originally a part of Nedunganad (ruled by Nedungadis, which was later annexed by the Kingdom of Valluvanad, which was again followed by the conquest of the Zamorin of Calicut around 15th century C. E. Nedunganad was ruled by a Samanthan Nair clan known as Nedungadis, similar to the Eradis of Eranad and Vellodis of Valluvanad. Other kingdoms in Palakkad district during medieval period included Kollengode and Kavalappara. Both of them became a part of the kingdom of Zamorin of Calicut around 15th century CE. Parts of Palakkad had also become under the Zamorin for sometime.

In 1757, to resist the invasion of the Zamorin of Kozhikode, the Palakkad Raja sought the help of the Hyder Ali of Mysore. In 1766, Hyder Ali defeated the Zamorin of Kozhikode – an East India Company ally at the time – and absorbed Kozhikode into his state. The Hyder Ali rebuilt Palakkad Fort in 1766. The smaller princely states in northern and north-central parts of Kerala (comprising Malabar District) including Kolathunadu, Kottayam, Kadathanadu, Kozhikode, Tanur, Valluvanad, and Palakkad were unified under the rulers of Mysore and were made a part of the larger Kingdom of Mysore. His son and successor, Tipu Sultan, launched campaigns against the expanding British East India Company, resulting in two of the four Anglo-Mysore Wars.

Malabar District in 1951

Tipu ultimately ceded the Malabar District and South Kanara to the company in the 1790s as a result of the Third Anglo-Mysore War and the subsequent Treaty of Seringapatam; both were annexed to the Bombay Presidency (which had also included other regions in the western coast of India) of British India in the years 1792 and 1799 respectively. Later in 1800, both of the Malabar District and South Canara were separated from Bombay presidency to merge them with the neighbouring Madras Presidency. Palakkad was under British Raj until 1947.

The municipality of Palakkad was formed on 1 November 1866 according to the Madras Act 10 of 1865 (Amendment of the Improvements in Towns act 1850) of the British Indian Empire, along with the municipalities of Kozhikode, Kannur, Thalassery, and Fort Kochi, making them the first modern municipalities in the modern state of Kerala.

Present-day Palakkad district was a part of Malabar District before the formation of Palakkad district. Thrithala Revenue block of present-day Pattambi Taluk was a part of the Ponnani taluk. Rest of Pattambi Taluk, Ottapalam, and Mannarkkad Taluks were included in the Valluvanad Taluk of Malappuram Revenue Division in Malabar District. The remaining three Taluks of current Palakkad district (Palakkad, Alathur, and Chittur) together formed the Palghat Taluk of Malabar District during British Raj.

At the time of 1951 Census of India, Palakkad was the second-largest city in the erstwhile Malabar District after Kozhikode. At that time only two towns in Malabar was treated as cities: Kozhikode and Palakkad. Following the formation of the state of Kerala in 1956, the erstwhile Taluk of Palakkad in Malabar District was divided into three: Palakkad, Alathur. Palakkad district was formed by taking parts of the erstwhile Malabar District. On 16 June 1969, Perinthalmanna taluk and Ponnani taluk were separated to form Malappuram district. On same day, Parudur village of Tirur Taluk was transferred to Palakkad district. Later some years, the Silent Valley National Park of Karuvarakundu village in Eranad Taluk (now Karuvarakundu is a part of Nilambur Taluk) of Malappuram district was transferred Mannarkkad Taluk in Palakkad district.

== Administration ==
=== Kerala Legislative Assembly seats ===
| District | No. | Constituency | Name | Party | Alliance | Remarks |
|---|---|---|---|---|---|---|
| Palakkad | 49 | Thrithala | V. T. Balram | INC | UDF | |
| Palakkad | 50 | Pattambi | Muhammed Muhsin | CPI | LDF | |
| Palakkad | 51 | Shornur | P. Mammikutty | CPI(M) | LDF | |
| Palakkad | 52 | Ottapalam | K. Premkumar | CPI(M) | LDF | |
| Palakkad | 53 | Kongad (SC) | K. A. Thulasi | INC | UDF | Minister of Scheduled Castes, Scheduled Tribes and Backward Classes Welfare |
| Palakkad | 54 | Mannarkkad | N. Samsudheen | IUML | UDF | Minister for General Education, and Minority Affairs |
| Palakkad | 55 | Malampuzha | A. Prabhakaran | CPI(M) | LDF | |
| Palakkad | 56 | Palakkad | Ramesh Pisharody | INC | UDF | |
| Palakkad | 57 | Tarur (SC) | Sumod | CPI(M) | LDF | |
| Palakkad | 58 | Chittur | Sumesh Achuthan | INC | UDF | |
| Palakkad | 59 | Nenmara | K. Preman | CPI(M) | LDF | |
| Palakkad | 60 | Alathur | T. M. Sasi | CPI(M) | LDF | |

=== Members of Lok Sabha ===
There are two Lok Sabha seats in Palakkad district.

| Sl. No | Constituency | MP | Party | Alliance |
|---|---|---|---|---|
| 1 | Palakkad | V.K Sreekandan | INC | UDF |
| 2 | Alathur | K. Radhakrishnan | CPI(M) | LDF |
| 3 | Ponnani (Thrithala only) | E. T. Mohammed Basheer | IUML | UDF |

=== Subdistricts (Taluks) ===
- Under the amended Indian Constitution, decentralized planning has been implemented in the state. The headquarters of the District Panchayat is at Palakkad Municipal town. The District Panchayat office building is near the Civil Station.

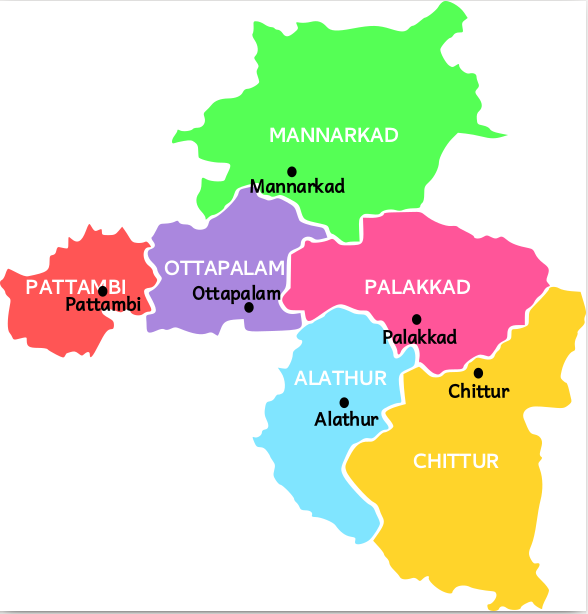
Taluks of Palakkad

| Subdistrict | Area (in km^{2}) | Population (2011) | Villages |
|---|---|---|---|
| Pattambi | 369 | 467,722 | 18 |
| Ottapalam | 477 | 462,970 | 24 |
| Mannarkkad | 1,209 | 384,393 | 25 |
| Palakkad | 713 | 612,116 | 30 |
| Chittur | 1,136 | 437,738 | 30 |
| Alathur | 571 | 444,995 | 30 |
Sources: 2011 Census of India, Official website of Palakkad district

== Economy ==
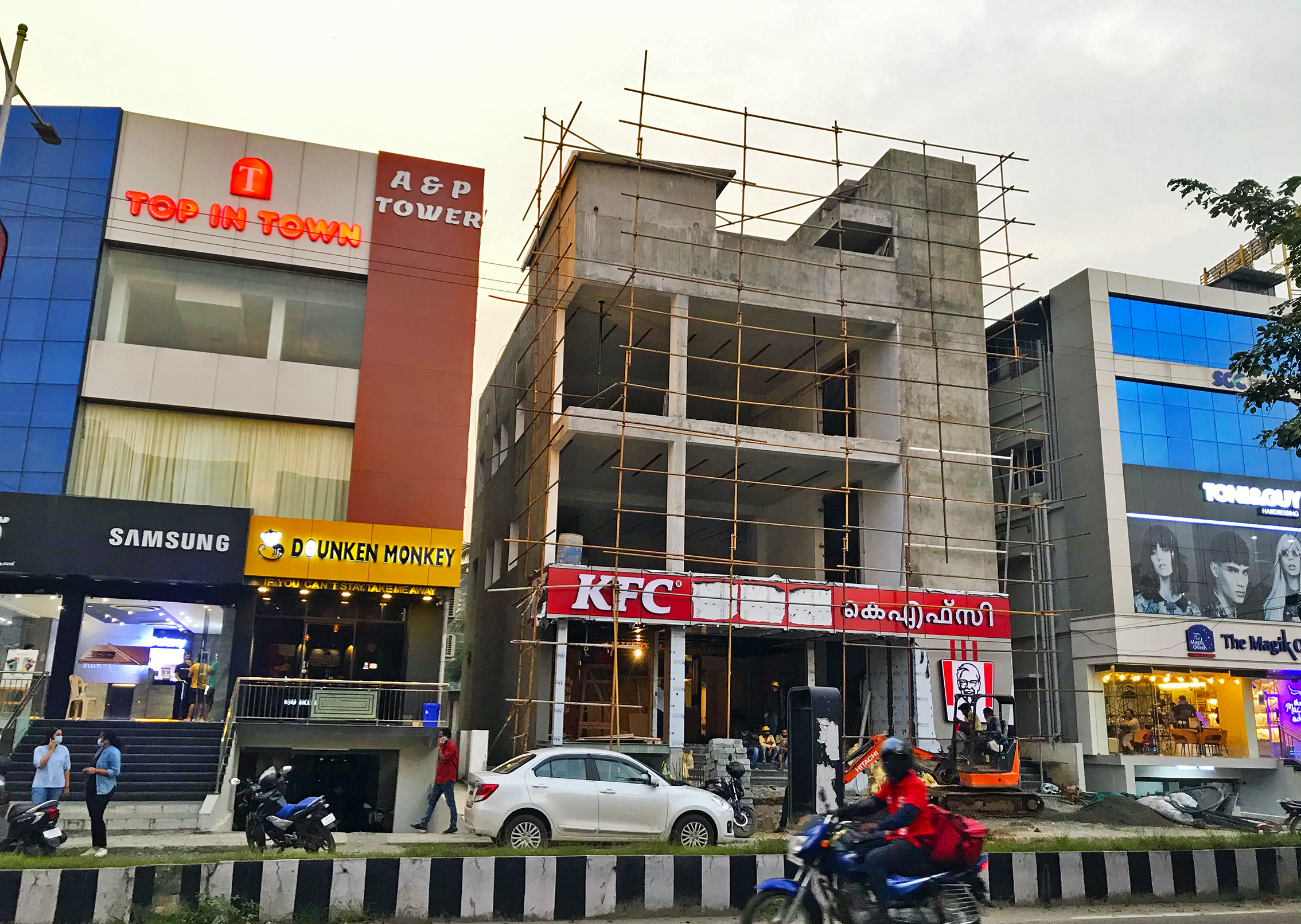
Stadium bypass, developing brand street

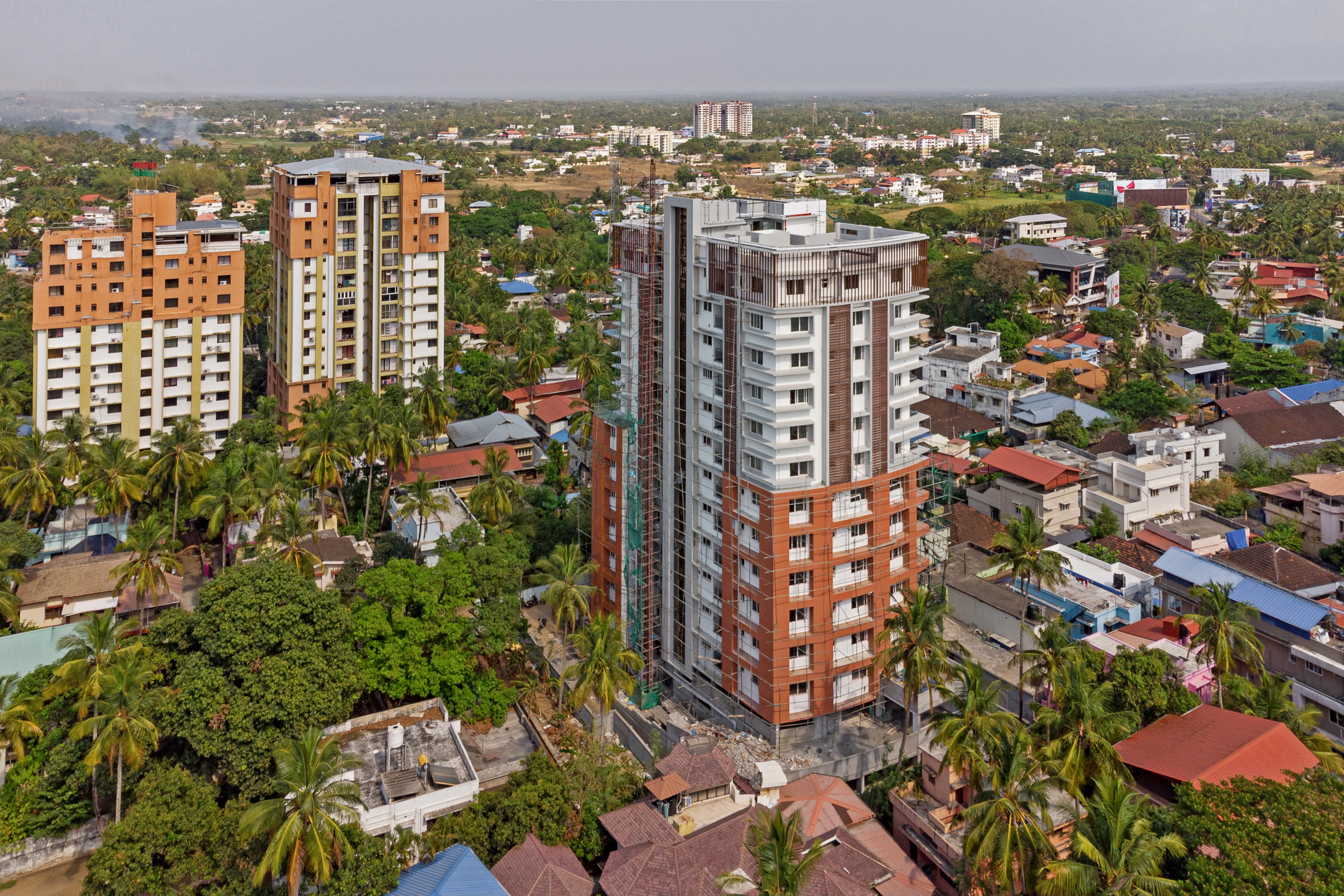
Growing Skyline of Palakkad city

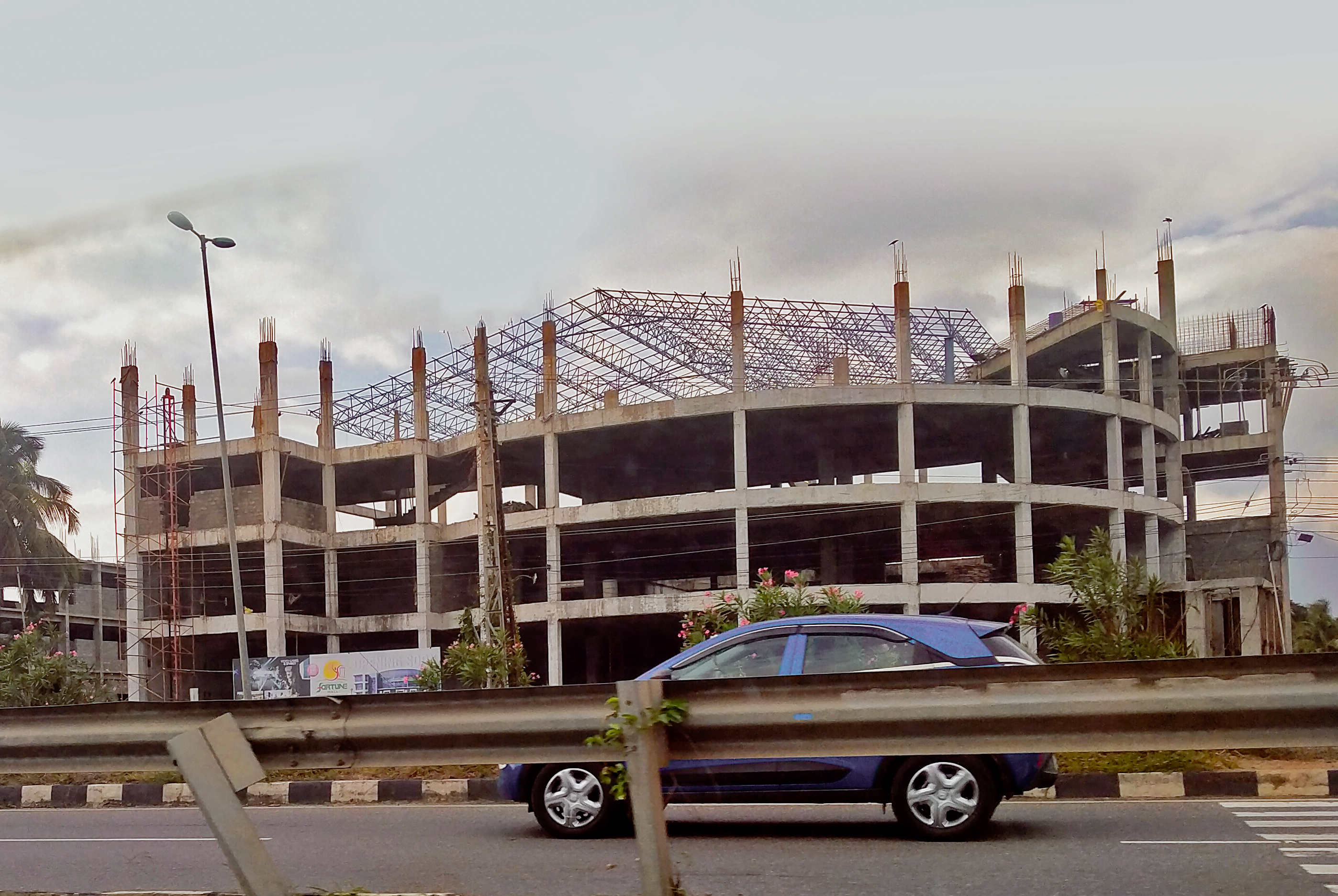
Upcoming Shopping Mall in Kanjikode

The presence of Palakkad Gap and proximity to Coimbatore make Palakkad economically important. Palakkad city is one of the largest industrial hubs in Kerala. Kanjikode area of Palakkad city is the second industrial hub of Kerala after Kochi. Kanjikode is one of the largest industrial areas in Kerala and companies like Indian Telephone Industries Limited (ITI), Instrumentation Limited, Fluid Control Research Institute, Saint-Gobain India Private Limited (formerly SEPR Refractories India Private Limited), Patspin India Ltd, Pepsi, PPS steel (Kerela) Pvt Ltd, United breweries, Empee Distilleries, Marico, Bharat Earth Movers Limited (BEML), Rubfila International Ltd, Arya Vaidya Pharmacy have production facilities. The commercialization of Palakkad City is Picking up and growing at steady pace in recent years, Nowadays Palakkad City and the suburbs are witnessing rapid amount of commercial and public development activities. The developments are mainly concentrated on the bypass roads, Both Stadium and Calicut bypass roads passing through city are getting major commercial projects. Major national and international branded Retail chains, food Chains, Restaurants, Hotels, Shopping complexes, Textiles, branded jewellers, Vehicle Showrooms, are functioning in and around city. There are many housing colonies consist of Villas and apartments are also present in Palakkad City and suburbs.

== Transport ==
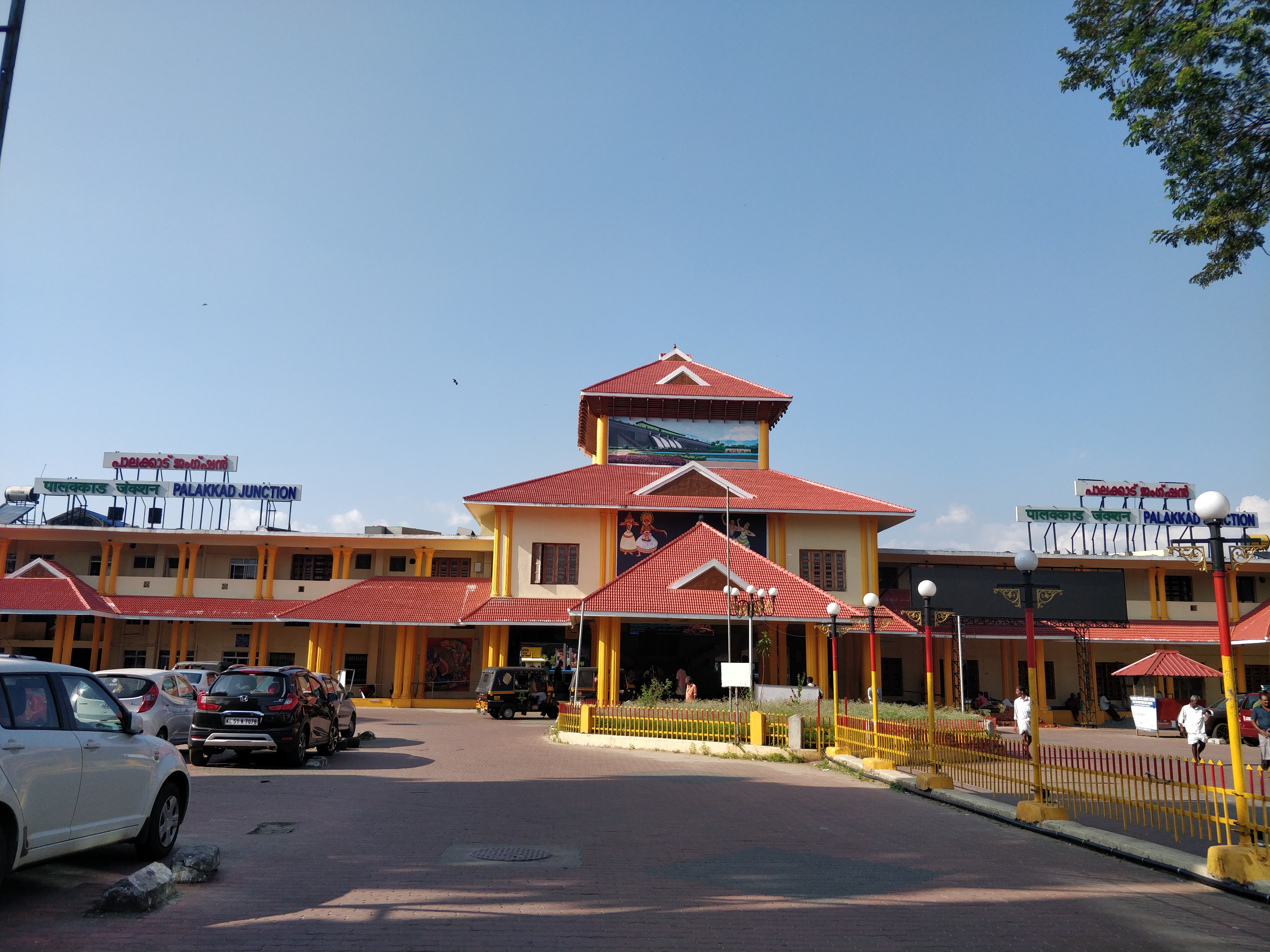
Palakkad Junction Railway Station

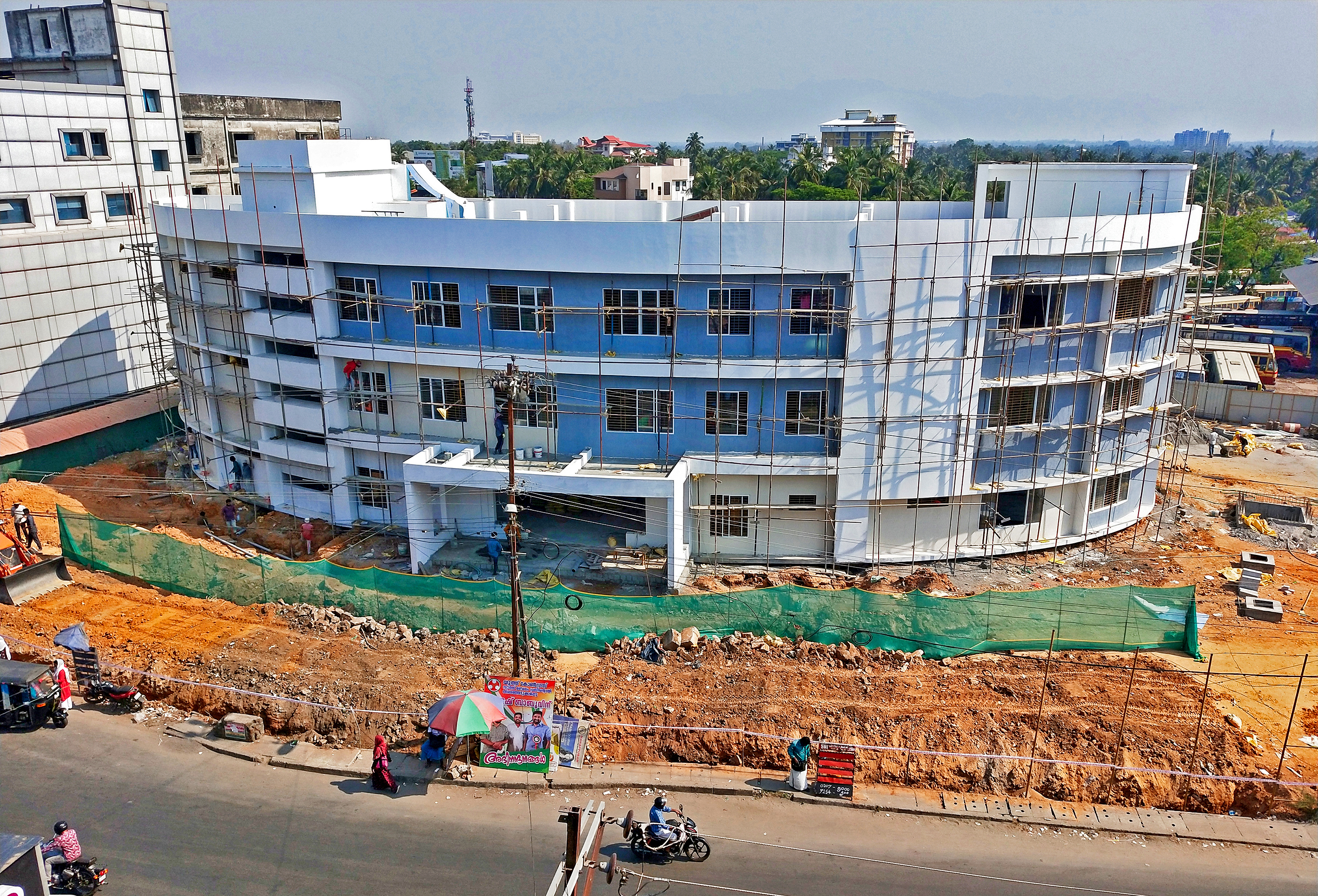
KSRTC Bus terminal, Palakkad

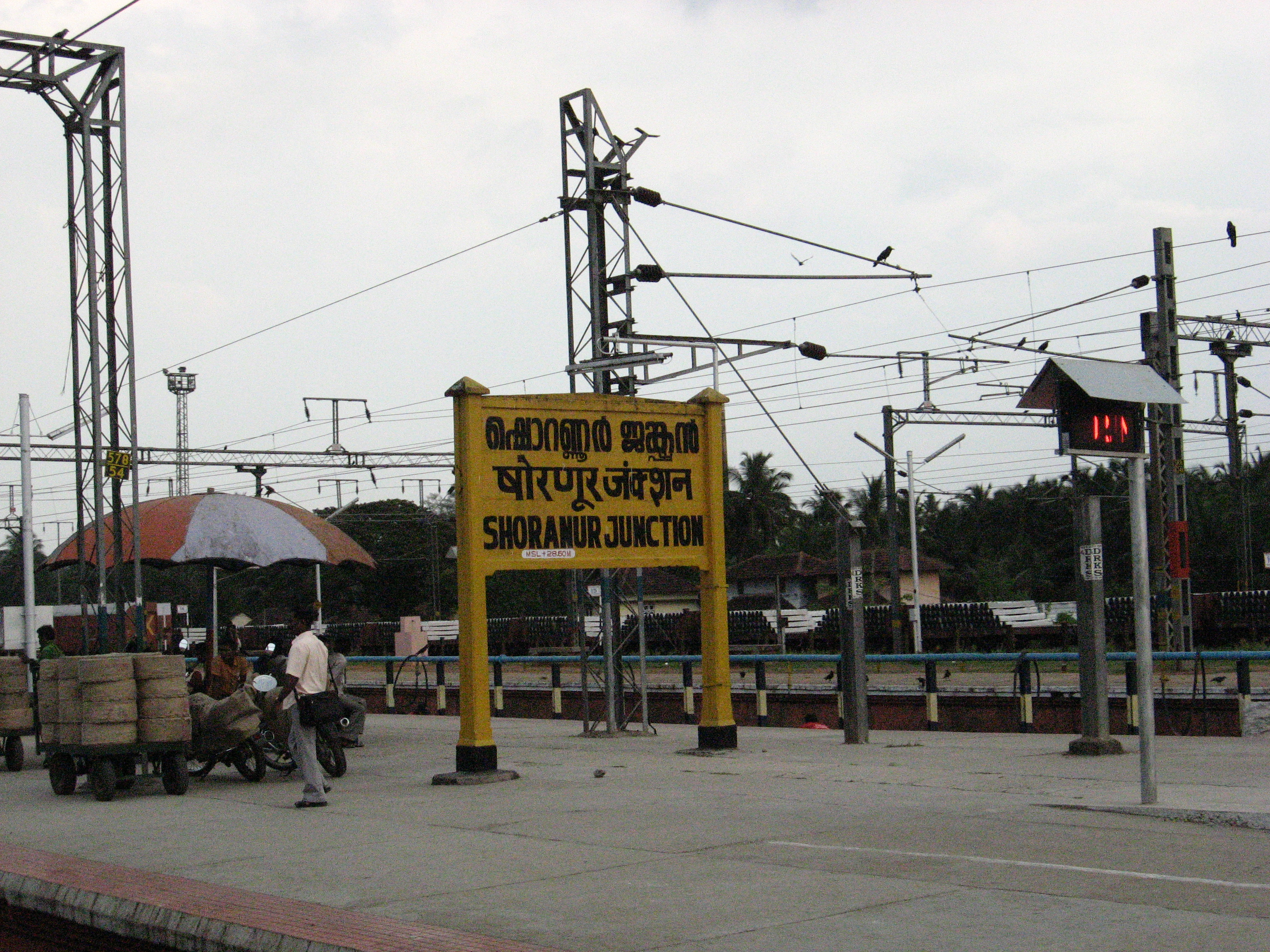
Shoranur Junction railway station

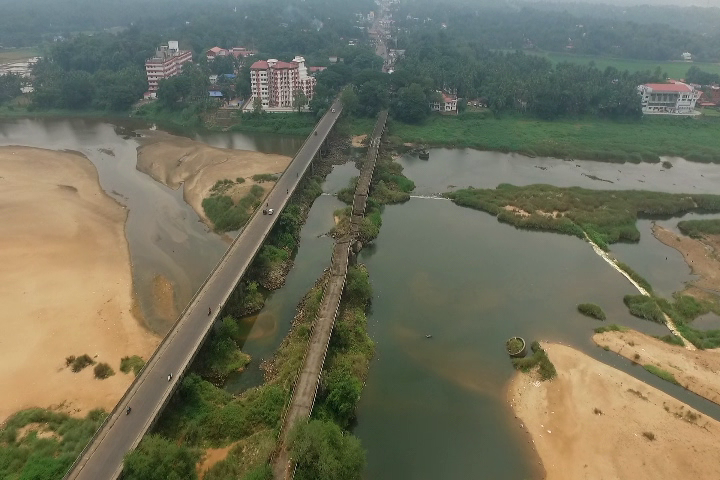
A view of the railway bridge over the river Bharathappuzha at Shoranur

=== Air ===
The nearest international airport is Coimbatore International Airport, which is about 62 kilometres (39 mi) from Palakkad. However, Cochin International Airport and Calicut International Airport serve the city as well.

There has been a proposal for a mini domestic airport at East Yakkara with respect to setting up domestic airports for enhanced air connectivity by the civil aviation ministry of India. 60 acres has been identified for the project at East Yakkara Palakkad.

=== Railways ===
The Palakkad railway division is one of the six administrative divisions of the Southern Railway zone of Indian Railways, headquartered at Palakkad. It is the smallest railway division in Southern Railway. It was formed by dissolving the Podanur division. Managing 588 route kilometers of track in the states of Kerala, Tamil Nadu, Karnataka and Mahé (in the Union Territory of Puducherry), it is one of the oldest railway divisions in India. The major stations under this railway division are Palakkad Junction, Shoranur Junction, Tirur, Kozhikode, Thalassery, Kannur, Kasaragod, Mangalore Central, Mangalore Junction and Pollachi Junction. It is the only division in India with no terminal facilities in its headquarters. The terminal facility of Palakkad division is situated in Shoranur Junction & Mangalore Central of Karnataka state.

The city is served by two railway stations – Palakkad Junction is a broad gauge railway junction (located at Olavakkode, about 4 km from Municipal bus stand) and Palakkad Town railway station located in the heart of the Palakkad city. The cities of Coimbatore, Tiruchirappalli, Erode, Salem, Thiruvananthapuram, Kollam, Mangalore, Kozhikode and Ernakulam are connected by the broad gauge line. Train services to Pollachi, Dindigul and Madurai are through the broad gauge line through Palakkad Town station. The Shornur Junction also has rail connections to Mangalore and the Konkan Railway, enabling travel towards Goa and Bombay. The trains coming from other parts of India are diverted to the north and south Kerala from Shoranur Junction in Palakkad District. From here, there is train service to Calicut, Ernakulam, Trivandrum, Shoranur and Nilambur.

Shoranur Junction railway station is the largest railway station in Kerala which plays a major role in connecting the southwestern coast of India (Mangalore) with the southeastern coast (Chennai) through Palghat Gap. It is also the meeting point of three important Railway lines: Mangalore-Chennai line, Nilambur–Shoranur line, and Kanyakumari-Shoranur line, due to the presence of Palakkad Gap.

=== Road ===
Palakkad has a medium-grade network of roads. The National Highway 544 from Salem to Kochi passes through the outskirts of the city.National Highway 966 starts from Palakkad and joins NH 66 near Kozhikode. Another important road is the Palakkad – Ponnani road which connects NH 544 and Mumbai-Kanyakumari coastal NH 66.

Palakkad City has four Bus Stations includes KSRTCTerminal Palakkad and three Private Bus stands named Stadium Stand, Municipal Bus stand, and Town Bus Stand. Palakkad KSRTC depot is the only depot in Palakkad district. Sub depot is present at Chittur serving Chittur-Thathamangalam. Operating centres are present at Vadakkenchery and Mannarkkad serving the respective towns. KSRTC Station Master office is present at Pattambi.

== Demographics ==
Historical population
| Year | Pop. | ±% p.a. |
|---|---|---|
| 1901 | 763,917 | — |
| 1911 | 819,726 | +0.71% |
| 1921 | 853,988 | +0.41% |
| 1931 | 941,286 | +0.98% |
| 1941 | 1,025,058 | +0.86% |
| 1951 | 1,214,208 | +1.71% |
| 1961 | 1,369,508 | +1.21% |
| 1971 | 1,685,347 | +2.10% |
| 1981 | 2,044,399 | +1.95% |
| 1991 | 2,382,235 | +1.54% |
| 2001 | 2,617,482 | +0.95% |
| 2011 | 2,809,934 | +0.71% |
| 2018 | 2,952,254 | +0.71% |

Religions in Palakkad district (2011)
| Religion | Percent |
| Hinduism | 66.76% |
| Islam | 28.93% |
| Christianity | 4.07% |
| Other or not stated | 0.24% |

According to the 2018 Statistics Report, Palakkad district has a population of 2,952,254, roughly equal to the nation of Armenia or the state Utah in the U.S. so it a ranking of 138th in India (out of a total of 640). The district has a population density of 659 inhabitants per square kilometre (1,710/sq mi). Its population growth rate over the decade 2001–2011 was 7.39%. Palakkad has a sex ratio of 1067 females for every 1000 males. The literacy rate of Palakkad district is 89.49%, which is the lowest in Kerala. Scheduled Castes and Scheduled Tribes make up 14.37% and 1.74% of the population respectively. The district is home to the largest ratio of Scheduled Castes (SC) population in Kerala, which accounts for around 15% of total population of the district.

The total Palakkad District population living in rural areas is 2,133,124 of which males and females are 1,031,466 and 1,101,658 respectively. In rural areas of Palakkad District, sex ratio is 1068 females per 1000 males. If child sex ratio data of Palakkad district is considered, figure is 969 girls per 1000 boys. Child population in the age 0–6 is 231,892 in rural areas of which males were 117,763 and females were 114,129. The child population comprises 11.42% of total rural population of Palakkad district. Literacy rate in rural areas of Palakkad District is 88.31% as per census data 2011. Gender wise, male and female literacy stood at 92.36 and 84.56 percent respectively. In total, 1,678,895 people were literate of which males and females were 843,855 and 835,040 respectively.

In 2011, Palakkad had population of 2,809,934 of which male and female were 1,359,478 and 1,450,456 respectively. In 2001 census, Palakkad had a population of 2,617,482 of which males were 1,266,985 and remaining 1,350,497 were females. Palakkad District population constituted 8.41 percent of total Kerala population in the census of 2011. In 2001 census, this figure for Palakkad District was at 8.22 percent of Kerala population.

In the 2011 Census of India there was change of 7.35 percent in the population compared to population as per 2001. In the previous census of India 2001, Palakkad District recorded increase of 9.88 percent to its population compared to 1991. The initial provisional data released by census India 2011, shows that density of Palakkad district for 2011 is 627 people per km^{2}. In 2001, Palakkad District density was at 584 people per km^{2}. Palakkad District administers 4,482 square kilometers of areas. Average literacy rate of Palakkad in 2011 were 89.31 compared to 84.35 of 2001. If things are looked out at gender wise, male and female literacy were 93.10 and 85.79 respectively. For 2001 census, same figures stood at 89.52 and 79.56 in Palakkad District. Total literate in Palakkad District were 2,239,492 of which male and female were 1,122,600 and 1,116,892 respectively. In 2001, Palakkad District had 1,938,818 in its district, With regards to Sex Ratio in Palakkad, it stood at 1067 per 1000 male compared to 2001 census figure of 1066. The average national sex ratio in India is 940 as per latest reports of Census 2011 Directorate. In 2011 Census of India, child sex ratio is 967 girls per 1000 boys compared to figure of 963 girls per 1000 boys of 2001 census data.

There were total 302,297 children under age of 0–6 against 318,884 of 2001 census. Of total 302,297 male and female were 153,696 and 148,601 respectively. Child Sex Ratio as per 2011 Census of India was 967 compared to 963 of census 2001. In 2011, Children under 0–6 formed 10.76 percent of Palakkad District compared to 12.18 percent of 2001. There was net change of −1.42 percent in this compared to previous census of India.

=== Languages ===
Languages of Palakkad district (2011)
1. Malayalam (93.7%)
2. Tamil (4.82%)
3. Others (1.47%)

At the time of the 2011 census, 93.71% of the population spoke Malayalam and 4.82% Tamil as their first language.

The administrative language and widely spoken language is Malayalam. Minority Dravidian languages like Irula (3560 speakers) and Kurumba (1028 speakers) are also spoken here. According to the 2011 census report, the percents of mother tongue of the total population is as follows:

== Tourist attractions ==
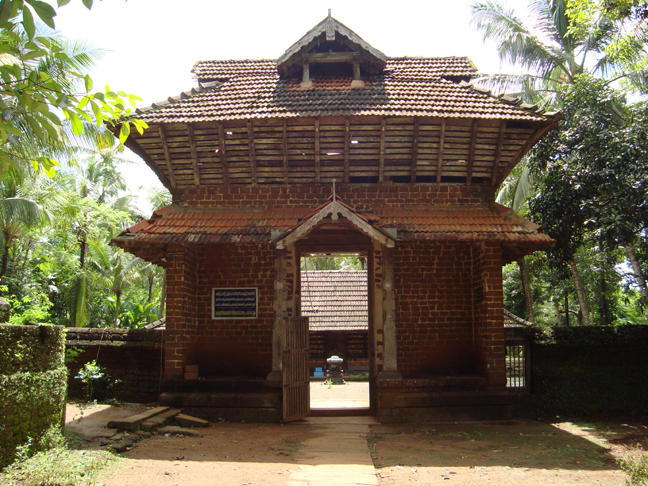
Varikkasseri Mana-one of the oldest traditional Namboothiri family houses (illam) in Kerala

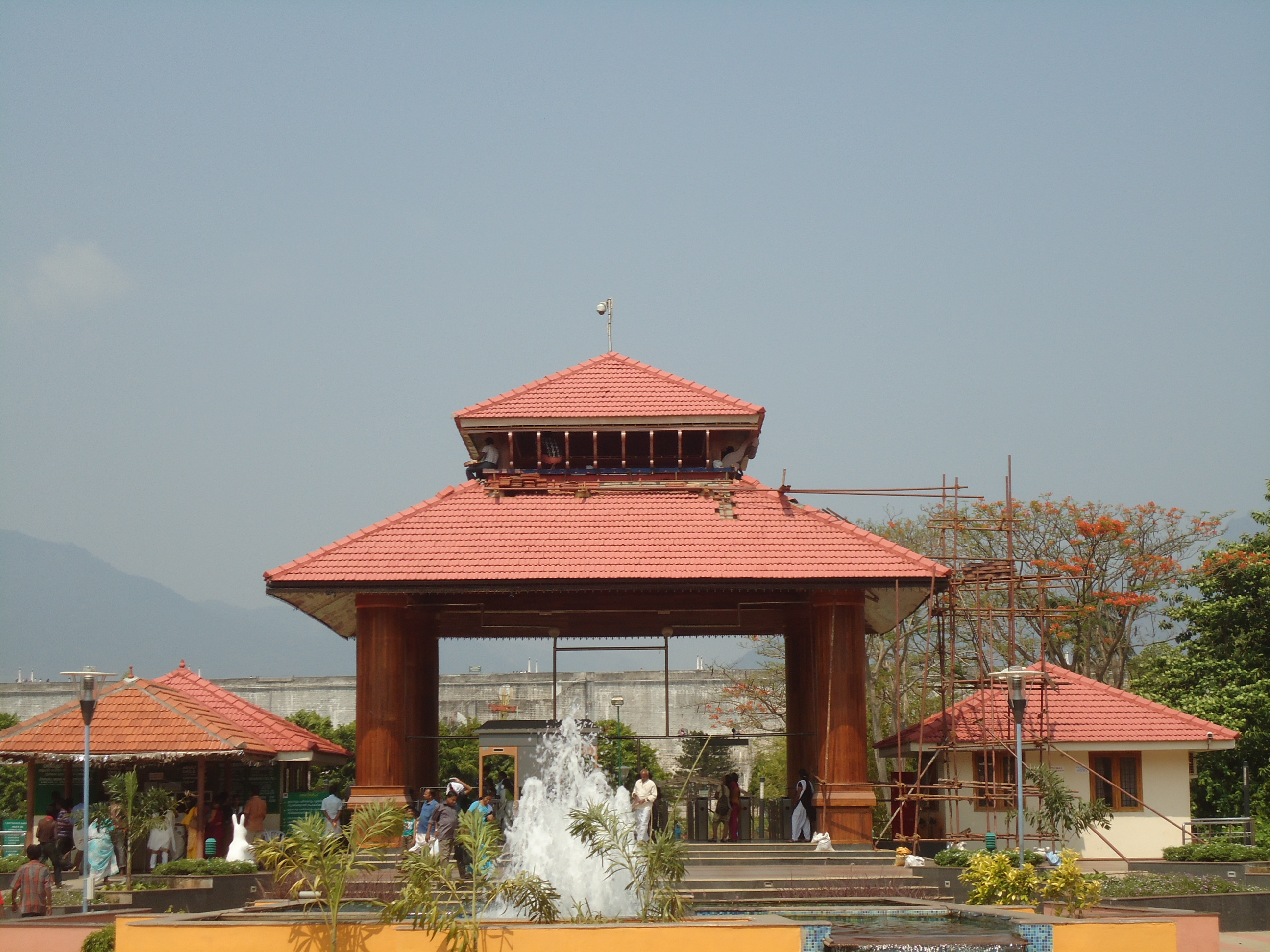
Malampuzha Dam Entrance

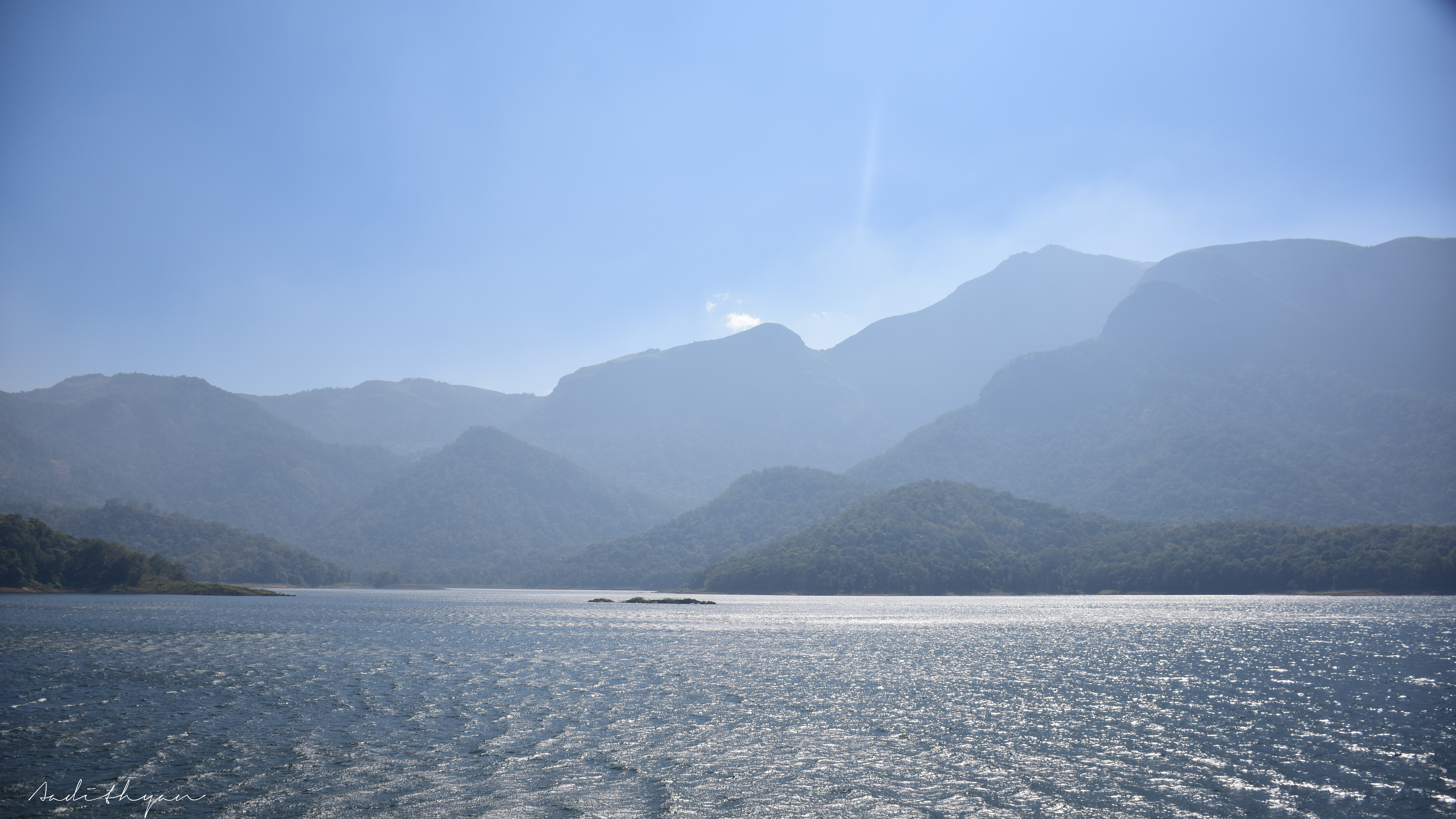
Pothundi Dam constructed in 19th century (British period), is one of the oldest dams in India

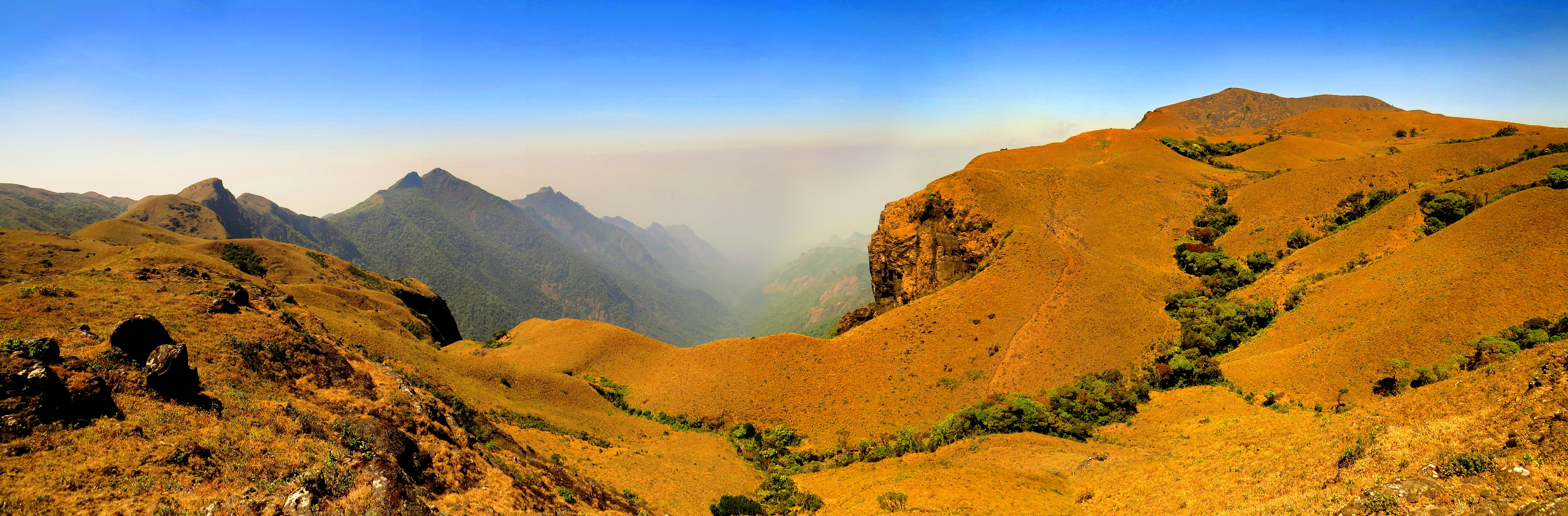
Silent Valley National Park

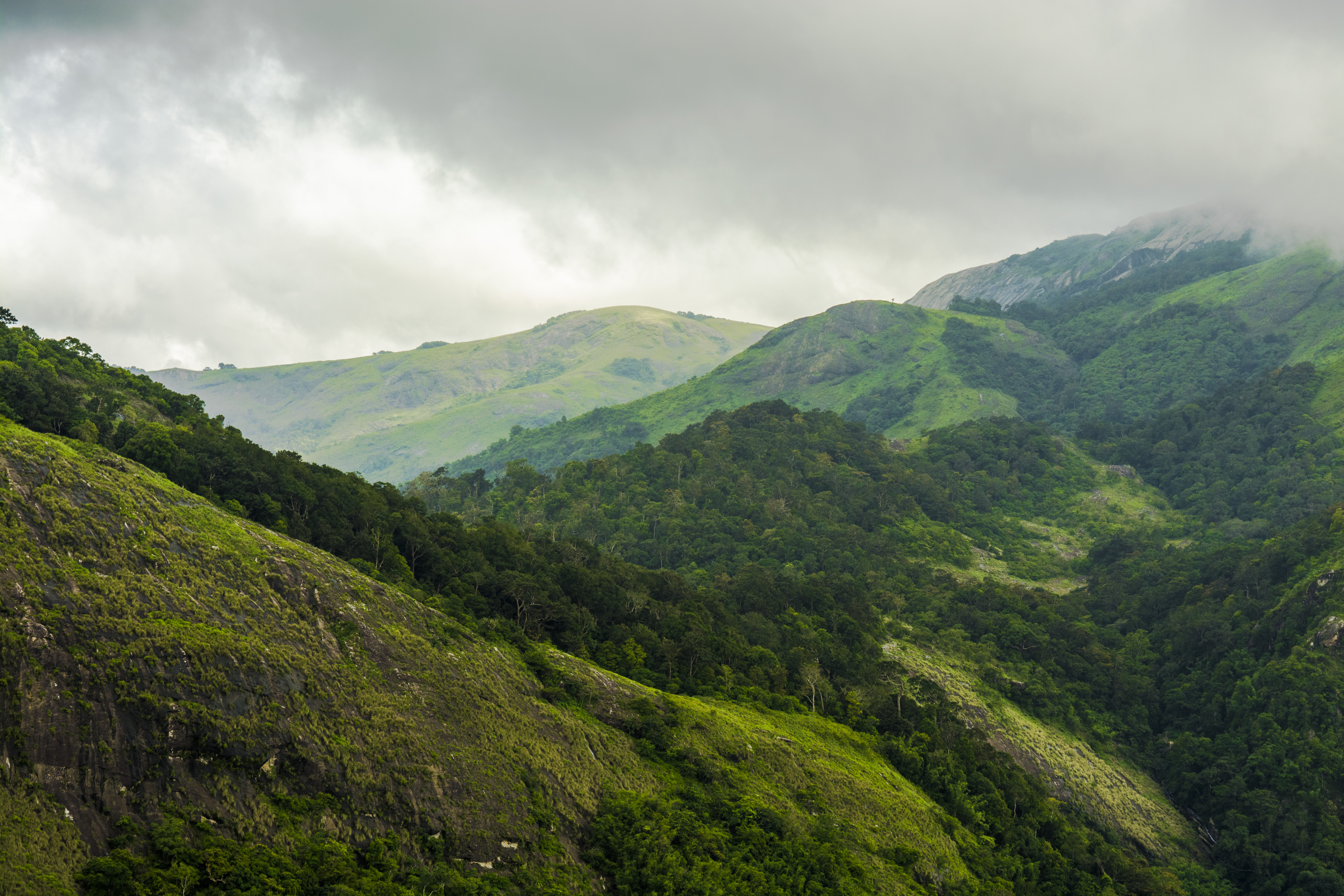
Nelliampathi mountains

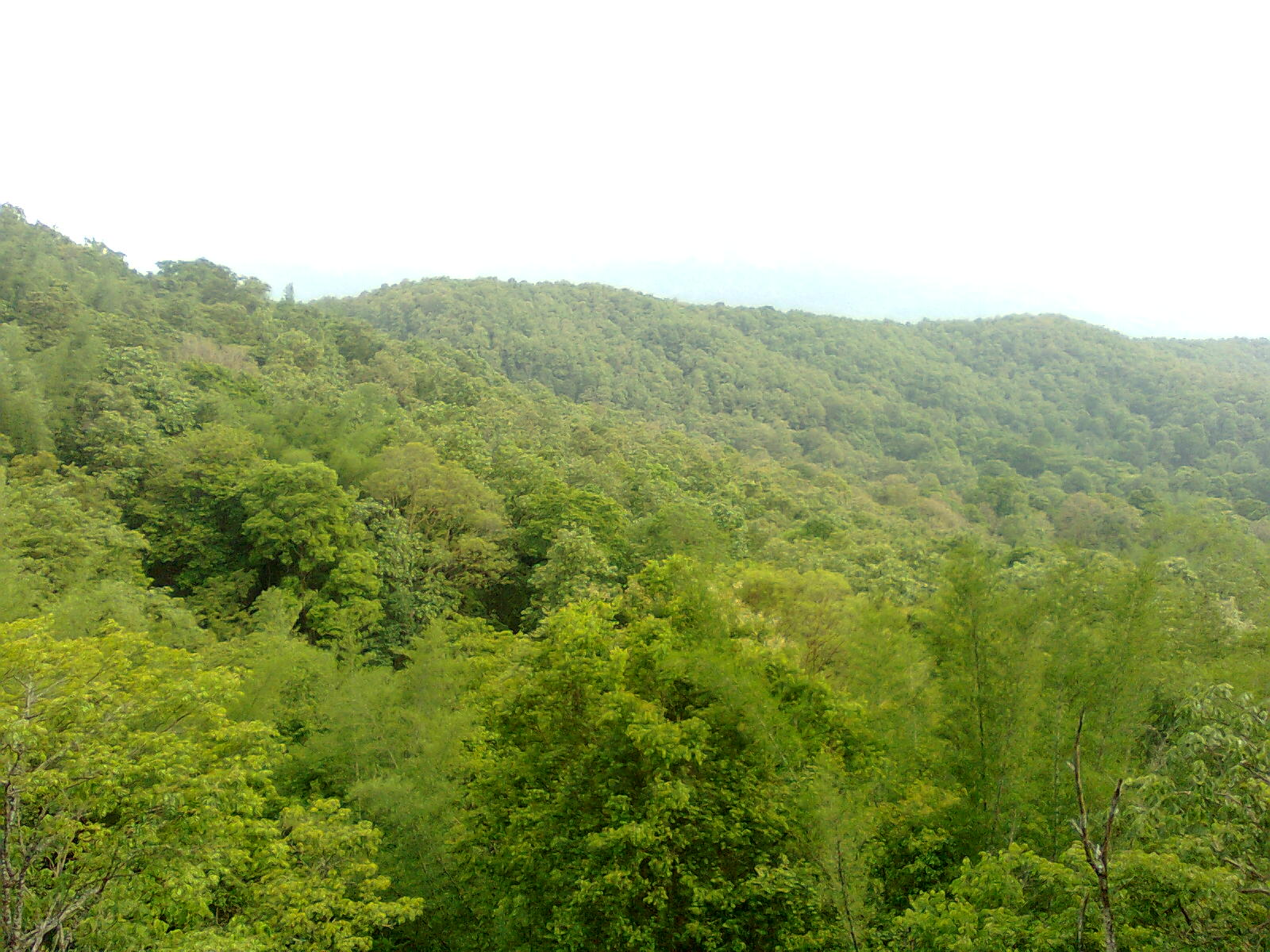
Parambikulam Wildlife Sanctuary

- Attappadi Reserve Forest
- Dhoni Waterfalls
- Elivai Mala
- Fantasy Park
- Kanjirapuzha Dam
- Kannimara Teak
- Karimpuzha Kovilakam
- Kollengode
- Malampuzha Dam
- Malampuzha Garden
- Mampara peak (Raja's cliff)
- Mangalam Dam
- Meenvallam Waterfalls
- Meenkara Dam
- Nelliampathi hillstation
- Palakkad Fort
- Parambikulam Dam
- Parambikulam Tiger Reserve
- Pothundi Dam
- Silent Valley National Park
- Siruvani Dam
- Siruvani Waterfalls
- Varikkasseri Mana
- Walayar Dam
- Sekharipuram

=== Silent Valley National Park ===
It is located in the rich biodiversity of Nilgiri Biosphere Reserve. Karimpuzha Wildlife Sanctuary, New Amarambalam Reserved Forest, and Nedumkayam Rainforest in Nilambur Taluk of Malappuram district, Attappadi Reserved Forest in Mannarkkad Taluk of Palakkad district, and Mukurthi National Park of Nilgiris district, are located around Silent Valley National Park. Mukurthi peak, the fifth-highest peak in South India, and Anginda peak are also located in its vicinity. Bhavani River, a tributary of Kaveri River, and Kunthipuzha River, a tributary of Bharathappuzha river, originate in the vicinity of Silent Valley. The Kadalundi River has also its origin in Silent Valley.

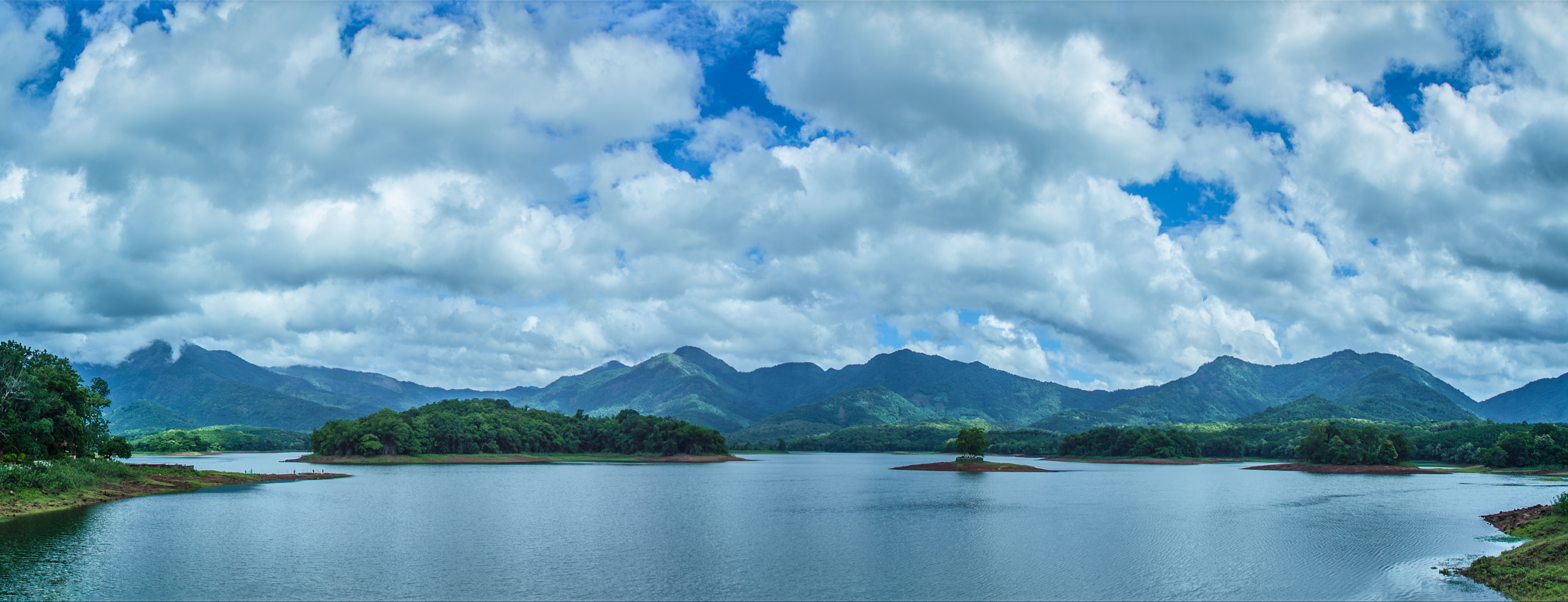
View of the Western Ghats Mountain Range from Mangalam Dam Reservoir

== Noted personalities ==
- Maythil Radhakrishnan
- V. T. Bhattathiripad
- Major Ravi
- Anumol
- Manikandan Pattambi
- Kaushik Menon (Playback Singer)
- Kalamandalam Gopi
- M.G. Sasi
- Shivaji (Malayalam actor)
- Anita Nair
- E Sreedharan (Metroman of India)
- Kunchan Nambiar
- K. P. Kesava Menon (Idealist, Founder of Mathrubhoomi)
- Methil Devika
- M. T. Vasudevan Nair
- O. V. Vijayan
- M. B. Rajesh
- K. Sankaranarayanan
- Sudev Nair
- Shashi Tharoor
- T. N. Seshan (Former Chief Election Commissioner)
- P. R. Pisharoty (Kollengode, Father of remote sensing in India)
- M. G. Ramachandran (Actor and former Chief Minister of Tamil Nadu)
- Niranjan EK(Decorated Military officer)
- Vidya Balan (Bollywood actress)
- Shankar Mahadevan (Singer)
- Stephen Devassy (Pianist)
- Priyamani (Actress)
- Raghuvaran (Actor)
- P R Nathan (Novelist, writer)
- Swarnalatha (Singer)
- Unni Mukundan (actor)
- Govind Padmasoorya (actor)
- M.P. Sankunni Nair (Novelist)
- Palghat Mani Iyer (Mridangist)
- Kocheril R. Narayanan (former president of india)
- V P Menon
- Olappamanna
- O V Vijayan
- Akkitham Achuthan Namboothiri
- Malayattoor Ramakrishnan
- K. S. Sethumadhavan
- P. Unnikrishnan
- Ottapalam Pappan, Malayalam Drama and Film Actor
- Gautham Vasudev Menon, Tamil Film director
- Lal Jose, Malayalam film director
- Anil Radhakrishnan Menon, Malayalam film director
- Bhaskar Menon, first Indian to head a multinational corporation, chairman of Lever Brothers (now Unilever)
- K. P. S. Menon, first Foreign Secretary of India. He also served pre-independence India as an Agent-General to China
- M. G. K. Menon, former Union Minister and Scientific Adviser in the Rajiv Gandhi administration
- KP Candeth, was a prominent Lieutenant General in the Indian army
- Shivshankar Menon, 4th National Security Advisor and 26th foreign secretary
- M. K. Narayanan, the former chief of the Intelligence Bureau and former National Security Adviser
- K. Sankaran Nair, former director of Research and Analysis Wing and former High Commissioner of India to Singapore
- C. Venkataraman Sundaram, former director of Indira Gandhi Centre for Atomic Research and Padma Bhushan recipient
- Dhruvan, Malayalam Film Actor
- Srinish Aravind, Television Actor
- O.Rajagopal

== Education in Palakkad ==
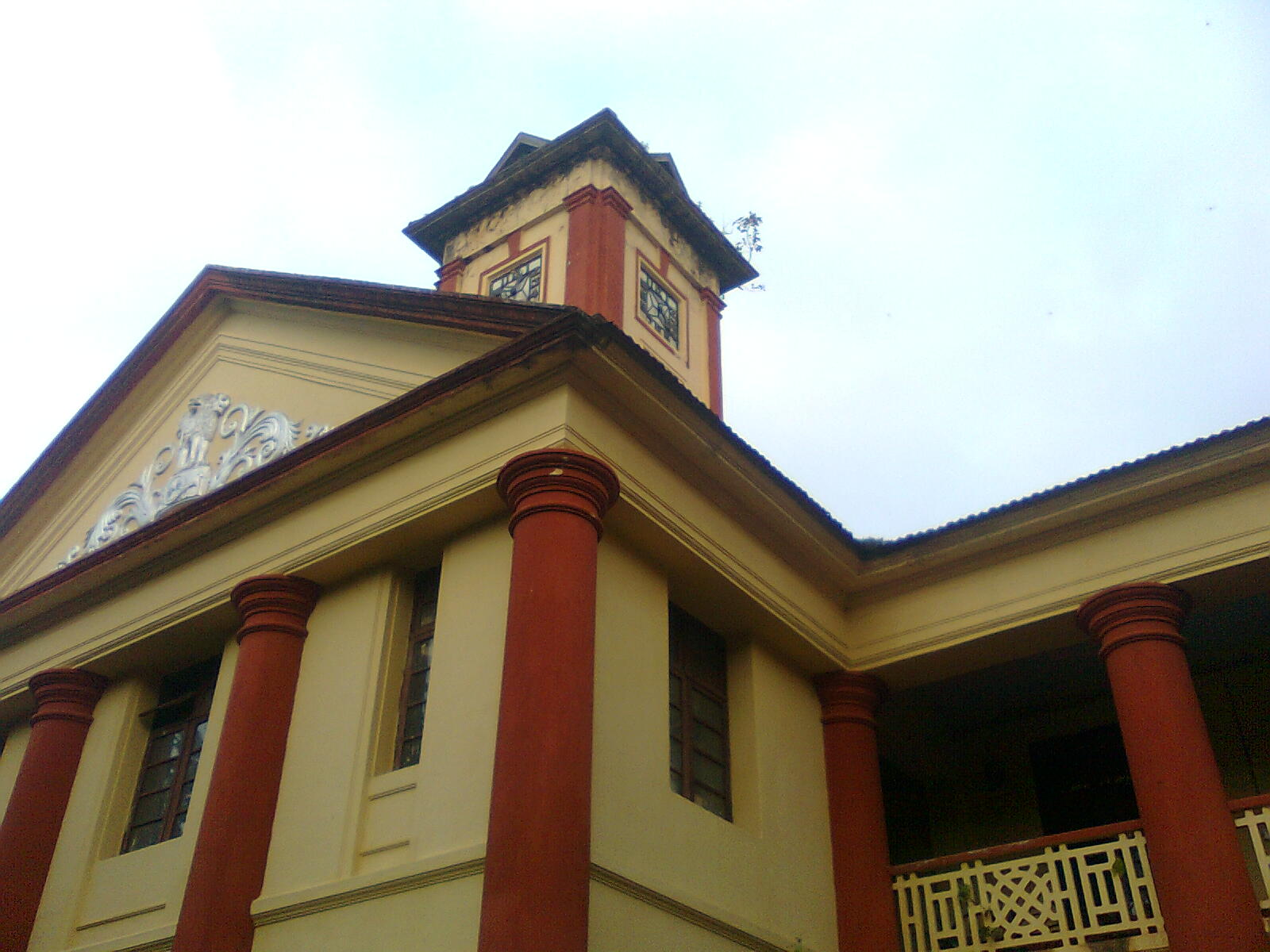
Government Victoria College, Palakkad

Indian Institute of Technology, Palakkad

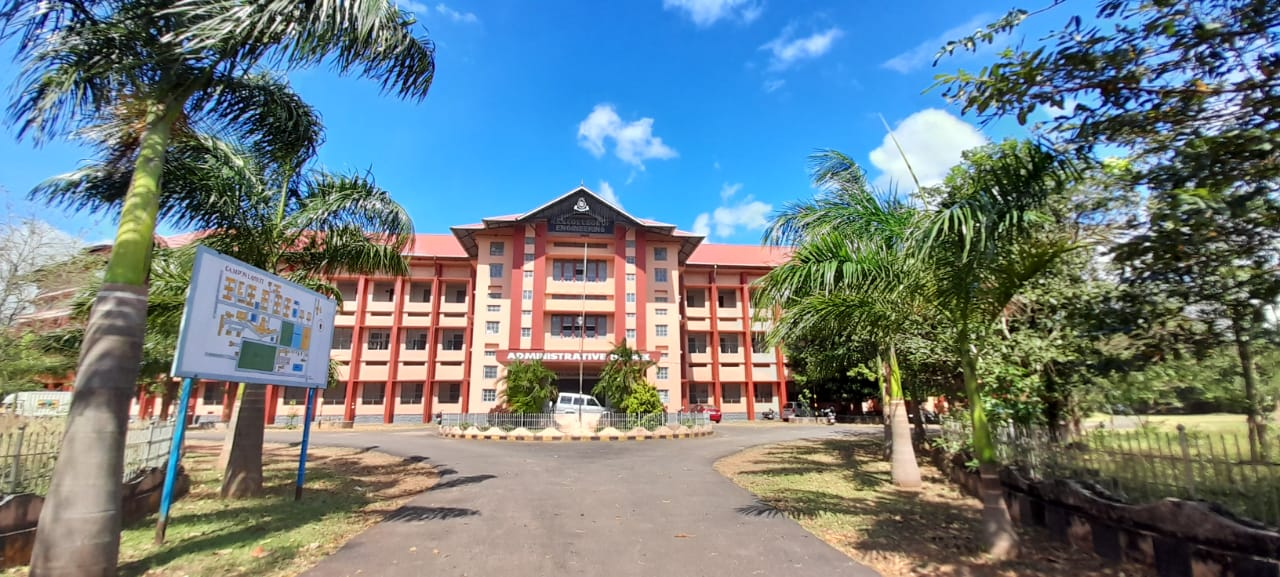
NSS College of Engineering, Palakkad

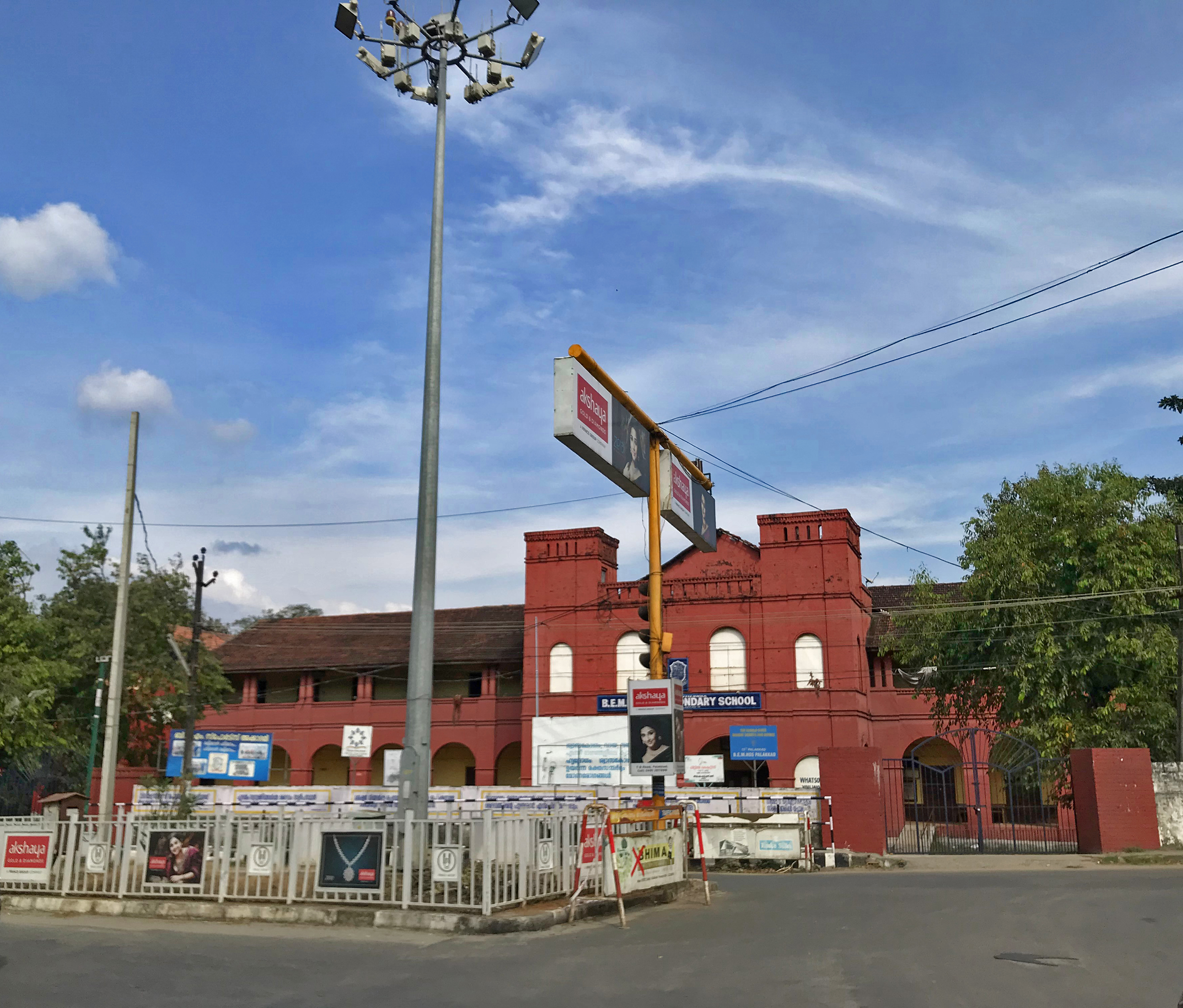
B. E. M. Higher Secondary School, Palakkad

Palakkad District is one of the main centre of education in Kerala state India. Palakkad District has Prominent Educational Institutions provide platform for various level of education. The district is home to the only Indian Institute of Technology in Kerala state. Palakkad District has three educational districts namely Palakkad, Ottappalam and Mannarkkad. There are several educational institutions working across the district. Government Victoria College, Palakkad, Government Engineering College, Sreekrishnapuram, NSS College of Engineering, Government Medical College, Palakkad, Chembai Memorial Government Music College, and many more higher level of educational institutions are located in Palakkad District.

Government Victoria College, Palakkad, established in 1866, is one of the oldest colleges in the state. The Government Medical College, Palakkad is started in 2014 is the first Government medical college in the district. The NSS College of Engineering at Akathethara, is the Fourth Engineering Institution established in Kerala, India. The Chembai Memorial Government Music College is one of the main centres of excellence in teaching carnatic music in the state. The Mercy College, Palakkad a women's college established in 1964 is one of the familiar institution in Palakkad city.

- IIT Palakkad
- Victoria College
- Government Medical College, Palakkad
- NSS College of Engineering
- MES Kalladi College, Mannarkkad
- District Public library, Palakkad
- Chembai Memorial Government Music College, Palakkad (est. 2000)
- NSS College, Ottapalam, Palakkad (est. 1961)
- NSS College, Nenmara, Palakkad (est. 1967)
- Government College, Chittur
- Sree Neelakanta Government Sanskrit College Pattambi
- Al-Ameen Engineering College, Shornur Palakkad
- Karuna Medical College, Vilayodi Palakkad
- Mercy College, Palakkad
- College of Applied Science, Vadakkencherry, Palakkad (est. 1993)
- Sreekrishnapuram VT Bhattathiripad College
- Industrial training institute, Malampuzha
- Government polytechnic, Kodumbu, Palakkad
- Sreenarayana college, Alathur
- Sree Neelakanta Government Sanskrit College Pattambi
- Yuvakshetra Institute of Management Studies
- Regional Agricultural Research Station, Pattambi, Palakkad
- PK DAS Institute of Medical Sciences, Ottapalam
- Kerala Medical College, Mangode, Palakkad
- Najath Arts and Science College, Mannarkkad, Palakkad
- College of Applied Science, Malampuzha, Kalleppully, Palakkad (est. 2008)
- College of Applied Science, Kuzhalmannam, Kottayi, Palakkad (est. 2008)
- College of Applied Science, Attappadi, Palakkad (est. 2010)
- College of Applied Science, Ayalur, Palakkad (est. 2012)
- A.W.H. College of Science and Technology, Palakkad
- Institute for Communicative and Cognitive Neuro Sciences, Palakkad
- Karuna Arts and Science College, Palakkad
- M.P.M.M.S.N. Trust College, Shornur
- Minority Arts and Science College, Padinjarangadi
- Royal Institute of Science and Technology, Palakkad
- Sadanam Institute of Commerce and Management Studies, Palakkad
- Sadanam Kumaran College, Pathiripala
- Sree Neelakanda Govt. Sanskrit College, Pattambi
- Sreekrishnapuram V.T. Bhattathiripad College,

Mannampatta

- Thunchath Ezhuthachan College of Management, Information Technology and Biotechnology, Palakkad
- V.V. College of Science and Technology, Palakkad
- Yuvakshethra Institute of Management Studies, Palakkad
- Ahalia Ayurveda Medical College, Palakkad
- Poomulli Neelakandan Nampoodiripad Memorial Ayurveda Medical College, Shoranur
- Santhigiri Ayurveda Medical College, Olassery Palakkad
- Vishnu Ayurveda College, Shoranur
- Ahalia School of Engineering & Technology, Palakkad
- Ammini College of Engineering
- Chathanmkulam Institute of Research and Advanced Studies, Menonpara
- Jawaharlal College of Engineering and Technology, Mangalam
- Prime College of Engineering
- Sreepathy Institute of Management and Technology
- NDFC Technical Institute & College for the Deaf, Shangaramangalam, Pattambi, Palakkad
- Government Arts & Science College, Pathirippala, Palakkad
- Govt. Arts and Science College, Kozhinjampara
- Govt. Arts and Science College, Nattukal, Palakkad
- Rajiv Gandhi Memorial Govt Arts & Science College, Attappadi, Palakkad (est. 2012)

== Media ==
Major Malayalam Newspapers include Malayala Manorama,Mathrubhumi, Deshabhimani, Suprabhaatham Daily have printing centers in Palakkad city and there are also few evening newspapers published from the city. Local news channels like (ACV) are also functioning in city. Palakkad Press Club is located on Robinson road, Sultanpet. A private FM Station operating in Palakkad at Ahalia Campus. There is a long term demand for setting up a government FM Station in Palakkad. At the present total number of 8 cinema halls are operational in Palakkad City which screens Malayalam, English, Tamil, Hindi movies, there are few other multiplex screens are under construction and expect to open near future in and around city.

== Sports ==
Indira Gandhi Municipal Stadium in the center of city was once used for Major sports meets and football matches in the state, but the stadium is not currently in condition for conducting games due to the lack of maintenance. There is a proposal for the renovation of the stadium with international facilities by the Municipality. The city has Fort Maidan also known as Kota Maidanam, a multi-use stadium in the center of the Palakkad. It is currently used mostly for cricket matches. Fort Maidan holds a maximum capacity of 10,000 people. Until 2002, the ground was considered for local cricket only. In 2003, the Ranji Trophy was introduced in Fort Maidan. The city has an Indoor Stadium located near Government Victoria College, Palakkad with a total area of 100,000 square feet (9,300 m^{2}) with commercial establishments still unfinished and incomplete. There is a Synthetic Track with eight lines operational in the ground of the newly constructed Government Medical College, Palakkad.

== Major Towns in Palakkad District ==
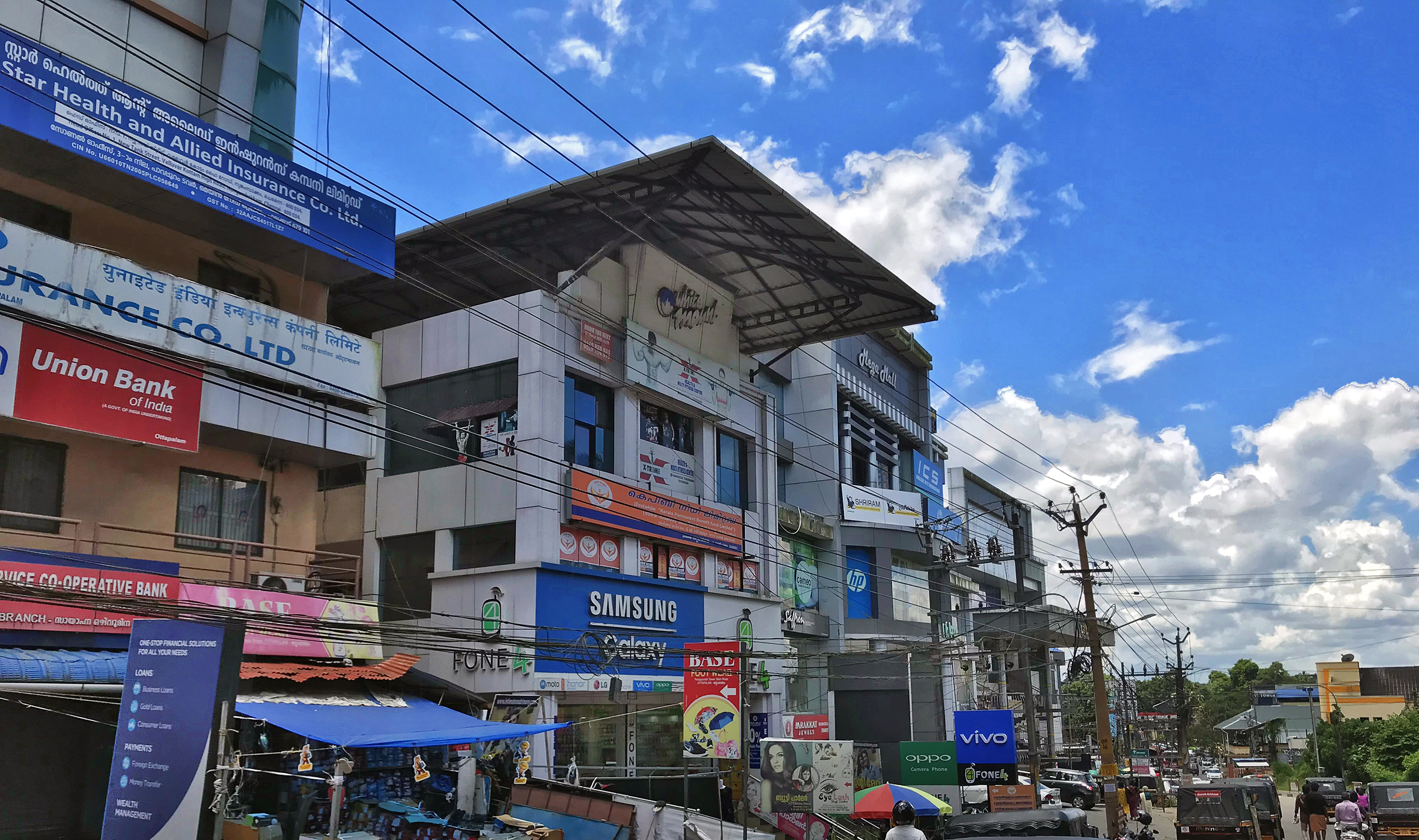
Ottapalam town

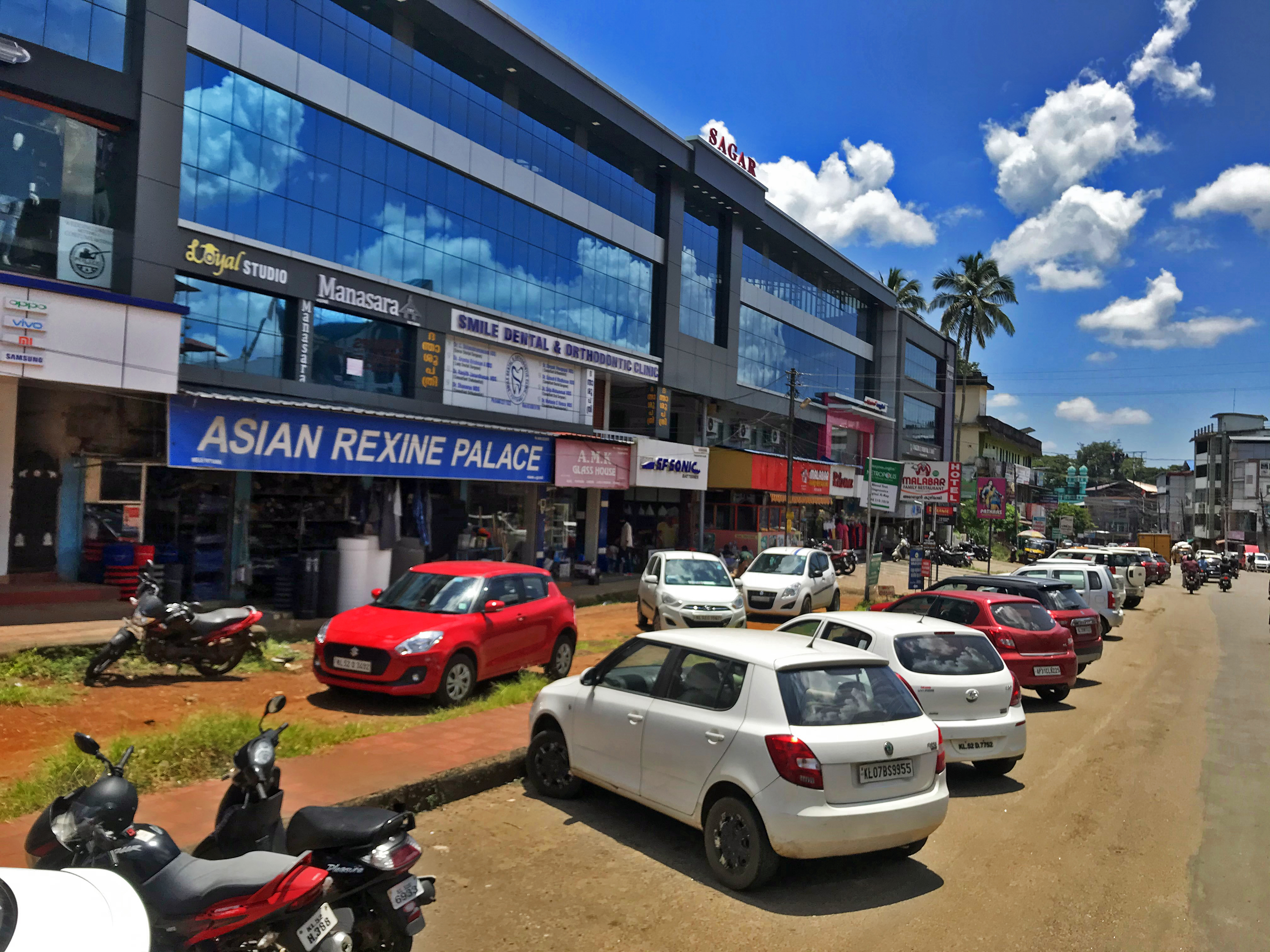
Pattambi Town

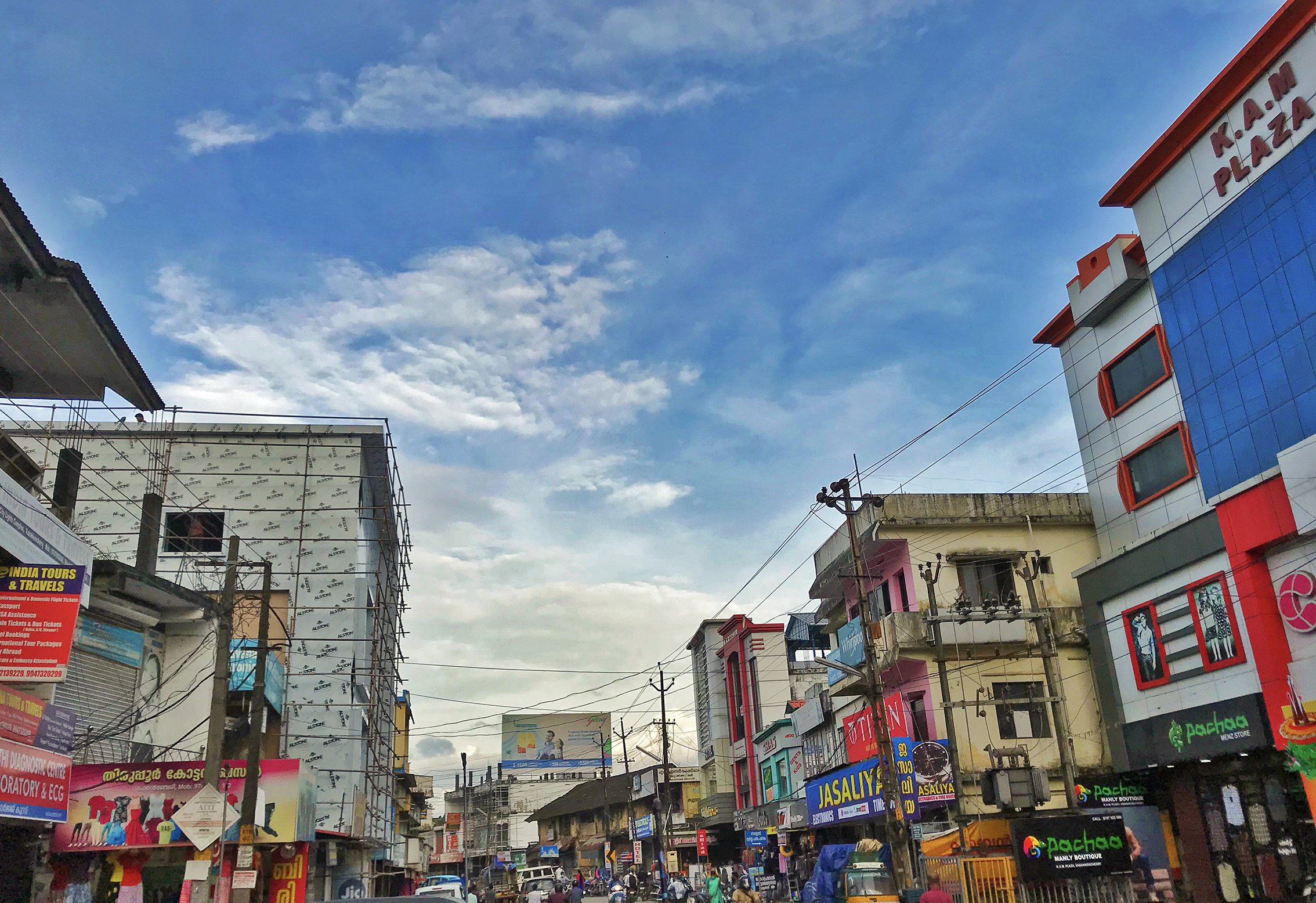
Vadakkencherry Town

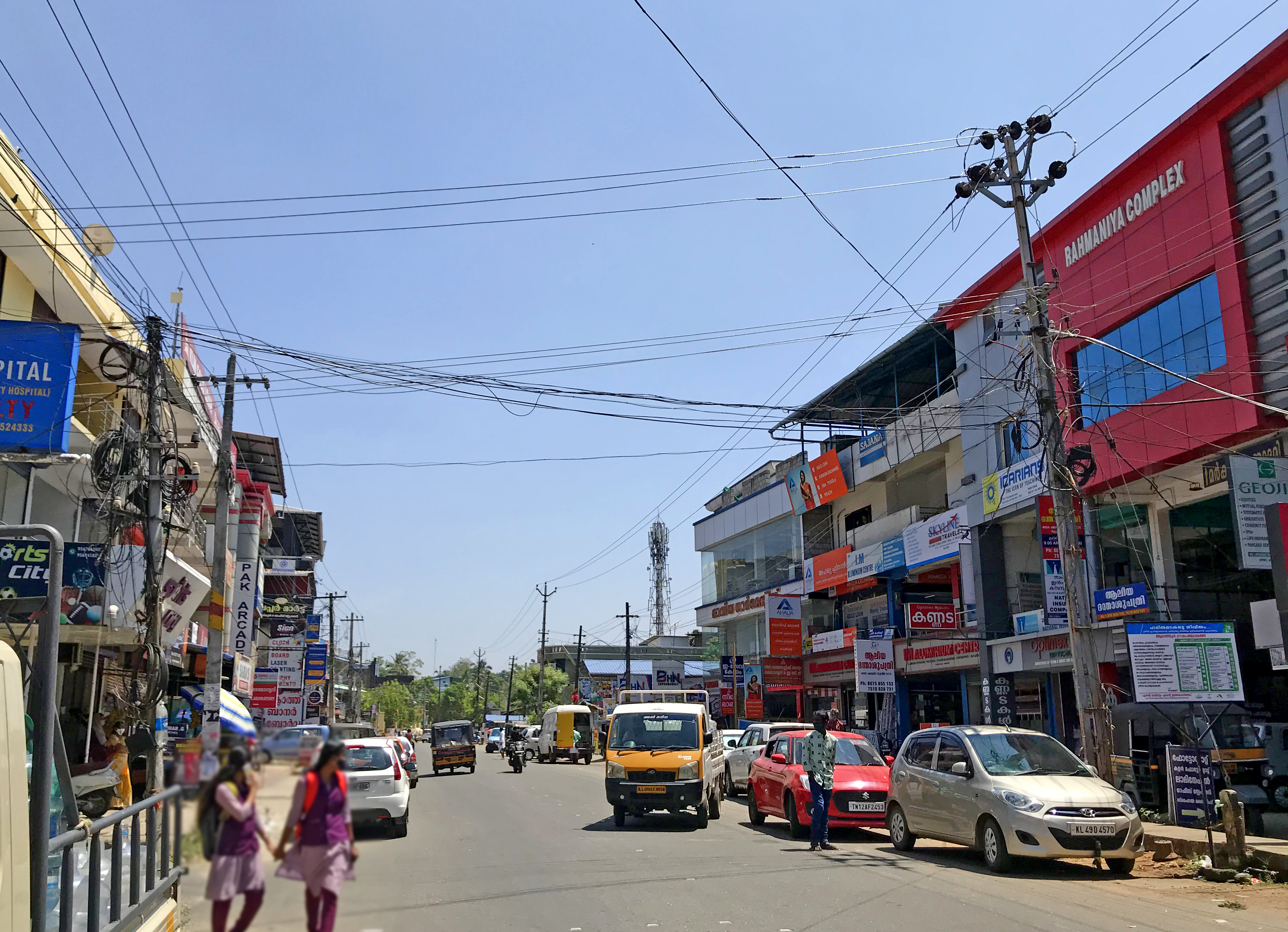
Alathur Town

- Palakkad
- Ottappalam
- Pattambi
- Mannarkkad
- Cherpulassery
- Kollengode
- Chittur-Thathamangalam
- Shornur
- Alathur
- Vadakkencherry
- Koduvayur
- Nemmara
- Kozhinjampara

== Gram panchayats in Palakkad District ==
- Agali (gram panchayat)
- Alanallur
- Alathur
- Ambalappara
- Anakkara (Palakkad)
- Ananganadi
- Ayiloor (gram panchayat)
- Chalavara
- Chalissery
- Elappully
- Elavancherry
- Erimayur
- Eruthampathy (gram panchayat)
- Kadampazhipuram
- Kanjirampuzha (gram panchayat)
- Kannadi
- Kappur (Palakkad district)
- Karimba, Palakkad
- Karimpuzha, Palakkad
- Kavasseri
- Keralasseri
- Kizhakkancherry
- Kodumba
- Koduvayur (gram panchayat)
- Kollengode, Palakkad
- Kongad (gram panchayat)
- Koppam
- Kottappadam (gram panchayat)
- Kottayi (gram panchayat)
- Kozhinjampara (gram panchayat)
- Kulukkallur
- Kumaramputhur (gram panchayat)
- Kuthannoor (gram panchayat)
- Kuzhalmannam (gram panchayat)
- Mankara
- Mannur
- Marutharode
- Mathur (gram panchayat)
- Melarcode
- Mundur, Palakkad
- Muthalamada, Palakkad
- Muthuthala
- Nagalassery
- Nalleppilly (gram panchayat)
- Nellaya Gramapanchayath
- Nelliampathi
- Nemmara (gram panchayat)
- Ongallur (gram panchayat)
- Pallassena
- Parali grama panchayat
- Parudur
- Pattencherry (gram panchayat)
- Peringottukurissi (gram panchayat)
- Perumatty (gram panchayat)
- Peruvemba
- Pirayiri
- Polpully
- Puducode
- Pudur, Palakkad
- Pudusseri (gram panchayat)
- Puthunagaram
- Sholayar (gram panchayat)
- Tachampara (gram panchayat)
- Tarur (gram panchayat)
- Thenkara
- Thenkurissi (gram panchayat)
- Thirumittacode (gram panchayat)
- Thiruvegappura
- Vadakarapathy (gram panchayat)
- Vadakkencherry (gram panchayat)
- Vadavannur
- Vallapuzha
- Vandazhy (gram panchayat)
- Vaniamkulam (gram panchayat)
- Vilayur

== See also ==
- Palakkad
- Palakkad Industrial Smart City
- Education in Palakkad district
- Nedunganad
- Districts of Kerala
- Political Divisions of Palakkad District

== Satellite Images ==
- Satellite image of Palakkad
- Road map of Palakkad
