= Chittur Assembly constituency =

Constituency of the Kerala legislative assembly in India

Chittur
- Constituency No. 58 for the Kerala Legislative Assembly
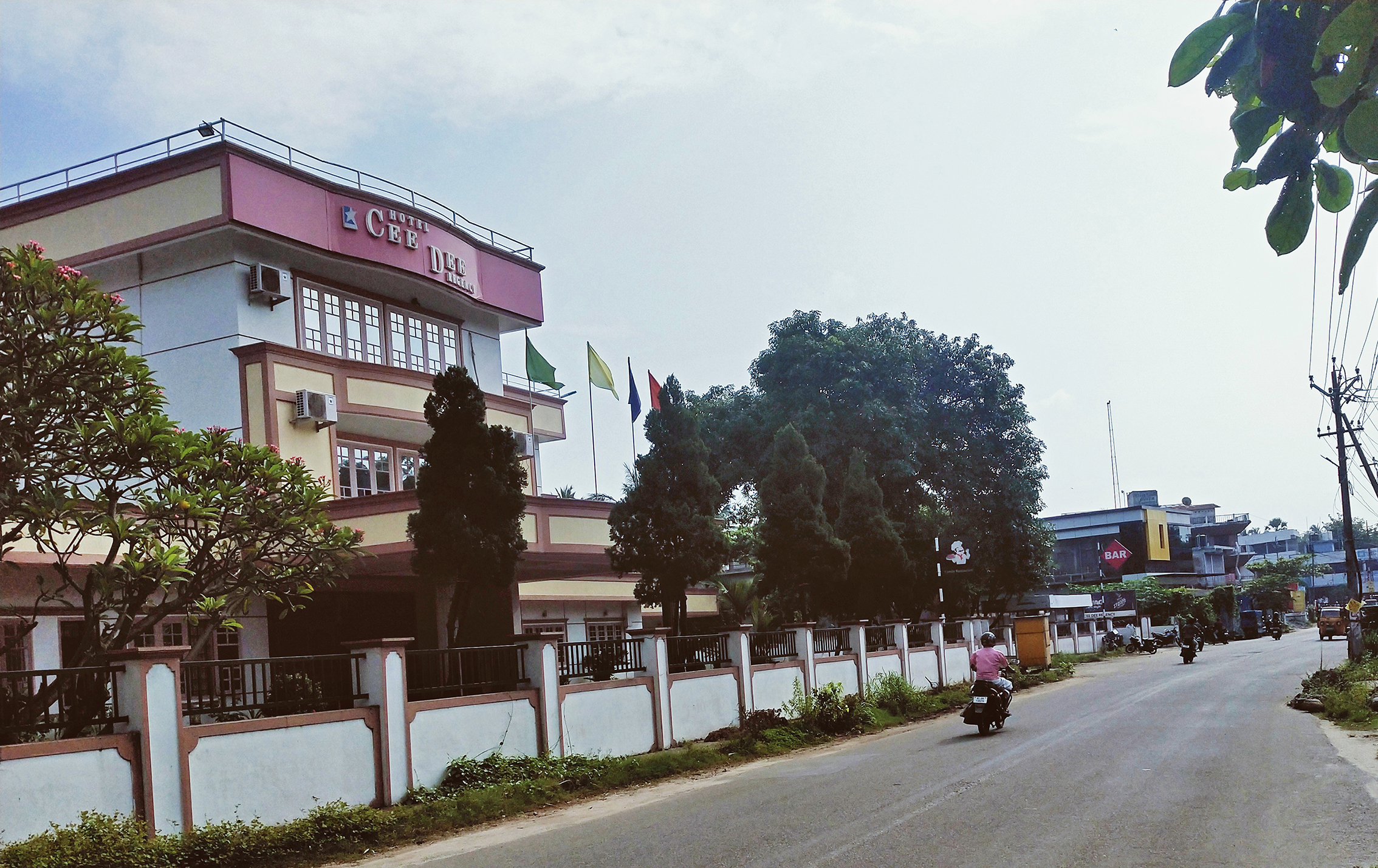
- Chittur-Thathamangalam municipal town

Constituency details
- Country: India
- Region: South India
- State: Kerala
- District: Palakkad
- Lok Sabha constituency: Alathur
- Established: 1957
- Total electors: 1,89,203 (2021)
- Reservation: None

Member of Legislative Assembly
- 16th Kerala Legislative Assembly
- Incumbent Sumesh Achuthan
- Party: Indian National Congress
- Elected year: 2026

Chittur State assembly constituency is one of the 140 state legislative assembly constituencies in Kerala in southern India. It is also one of the seven state legislative assembly constituencies included in Alathur Lok Sabha constituency. As of the 2026 assembly elections, the current MLA is Sumesh Achuthan of INC.

== Local self-governed segments ==
Chittur Assembly constituency is composed of the following local self-governed segments:

Name	Status (grama panchayat/municipality)	Taluk
Chittur-Thathamangalam	Municipality	Chittur
Eruthempathy	Grama panchayat	Chittur
Kozhinjampara	Grama Panchayat	Chittur
Nalleppilly	Grama panchayat	Chittur
Pattanchery	Grama panchayat	Chittur
Perumatty	Grama panchayat	Chittur
Vadakarapathy	Grama panchayat	Chittur
Peruvemba	Grama panchayat	Palakkad
Polpully	Grama panchayat	Palakkad

== Members of Legislative Assembly ==
The following list contains all members of Kerala Legislative Assembly who have represented the constituency:

Year	Name	Political party
1957	P. Balachandra Menon	Communist Party of India
1957	K. Eacharan	Indian National Congress
1960	P. Balachandra Menon	Communist Party of India
1960	Narayanan Thandan	Communist Party of India
1967	K. A. Sivarama Bharathy	Samyukta Socialist Party
1970	K. A. Sivarama Bharathy	Samyukta Socialist Party
1977	P. Sankar	Communist Party of India
1980	K. Krishnankutty	Janata Party
1982	K. Krishnankutty	Janata Party
1987	K. A. Chandran	Indian National Congress
1991	K. Krishnankutty	Janata Dal
1996	K. Achuthan	Indian National Congress
2001	K. Achuthan	Indian National Congress
2006	K. Achuthan	Indian National Congress
2011	K. Achuthan	Indian National Congress
2016	K. Krishnankutty	Janata Dal (Secular)
2021	K. Krishnankutty	Janata Dal (Secular)
2026	Sumesh Achuthan	Indian National Congress

== Election results ==
Percentage change (±%) denotes the change in the number of votes from the immediate previous election.

=== 2026 ===
2026 Kerala Legislative Assembly election: Chittur
Party	Candidate	Votes	%	±%
INC	Sumesh Achuthan	65,325	44.20	▲10.98
ISJD	Adv. V. Murugadas	58,815	39.79	▼15.59
BJP	Pranesh Rajendran	14,697	9.94	▲0.48
Independent	Murugadas. P.	6,984	4.72	−
Independent	N S K Puram Sasikumar	408	0.28	−
Independent	Sumesh C	261	0.18	−
NOTA	None of the above	1,298	0.88	▲0.04
Margin of victory		6,510	4.41	▼17.74
Turnout		1,28,330	75.12	
INC gain from JD(S)		Swing	▲10.48	

Local Body	Booths	UDF Votes	LDF Votes	NDA/BJP Votes	Murugadas P. IND	Winner	Lead
Peruvemba	16	5842	5323	1096	641	UDF	519
Polpully	13	3971	4671	1447	446	LDF	700
Vadakarapathy	25	7904	6764	1461	1137	UDF	1140
Eruthempathy	31	9270	7080	2644	1091	UDF	2190
Kozhinjampara	17	5607	5134	1054	604	UDF	473
Nalleppilly	15	4610	4872	1785	575	LDF	262
Chittur-Thathamangalam Municipality	36	14677	9215	2745	797	UDF	5462
Pattanchery	21	6944	8301	1354	867	LDF	1357
Perumatty	19	5454	6589	927	755	LDF	1135
TOTAL EVM	193	64279	57949	14513	6913	UDF	6330

=== 2021 ===
2021 Kerala Legislative Assembly election: Chittur
Party	Candidate	Votes	%	±%
JD(S)	K. Krishnankutty	84,672	55.38	▲10.48
INC	Sumesh Achuthan	50,794	33.22	▼6.96
BJP	V. Natesan	14,458	9.46	▲1.33
NOTA	None of the above	1,285	0.84	▼0.02
BSP	A. Chandran	918	0.60	▼0.23
Independent	K. Prameela	552	0.44	−
Independent	N. S. K. Puram Sasikumar	226	0.15	−
Margin of victory		33,878	22.15	
Turnout		1,52,905		
JD(S) hold		Swing	▲10.48	

=== 2016 ===
There were 1,85,995 registered voters in the constituency for the 2016 election.

2016 Kerala Legislative Assembly election: Chittur
Party	Candidate	Votes	%	±%
JD(S)	K. Krishnankutty	69,270	44.90	−
INC	K. Achuthan	61,985	40.18	▼11.15
BJP	Sasikumar M.	12,537	8.13	▲4.81
AIADMK	Mayilswamy	6,212	4.03	−
NOTA	None of the above	1,260	0.82	−
Independent	Santha	679	0.44	−
Independent	Kishnakutty Kunnath	672	0.44	−
BSP	P. C. Ramachandran	571	0.37	▼0.09
Independent	Achuthan Thankanivas	495	0.32	−
SUCI(C)	A. Rajeena	442	0.29	▼0.06
Independent	A. Krishnakutty Aramuri	157	0.10	−
Margin of victory		7,285	4.72	
Turnout		1,54,280	82.95	▲1.78
JD(S) gain from INC		Swing		

=== 2011 ===
There were 1,67,800 registered voters in the constituency for the 2011 election.

2011 Kerala Legislative Assembly election: Chittur
Party	Candidate	Votes	%	±%
INC	K. Achuthan	69,916	51.33	
CPI(M)	S. Subhash Chadrabose	57,586	42.28	
BJP	A. K. Omanakuttan	4,518	3.32	
Independent	K. Kaladharan	1,319	0.97	
SDPI	A. Muhammed Haneefa	1,192	0.88	−
BSP	V. Lakshmi	626	0.46	−
Independent	K. Achuthan	570	0.42	
SUCI(C)	A. Rajeena	472	0.35	
Margin of victory		12,330	9.05	
Turnout		1,36,199	81.17	
INC hold		Swing		

== See also ==
- Chittur
- Palakkad district
- List of constituencies of the Kerala Legislative Assembly
- 2016 Kerala Legislative Assembly election
