= Education in Palakkad district =

Education in India

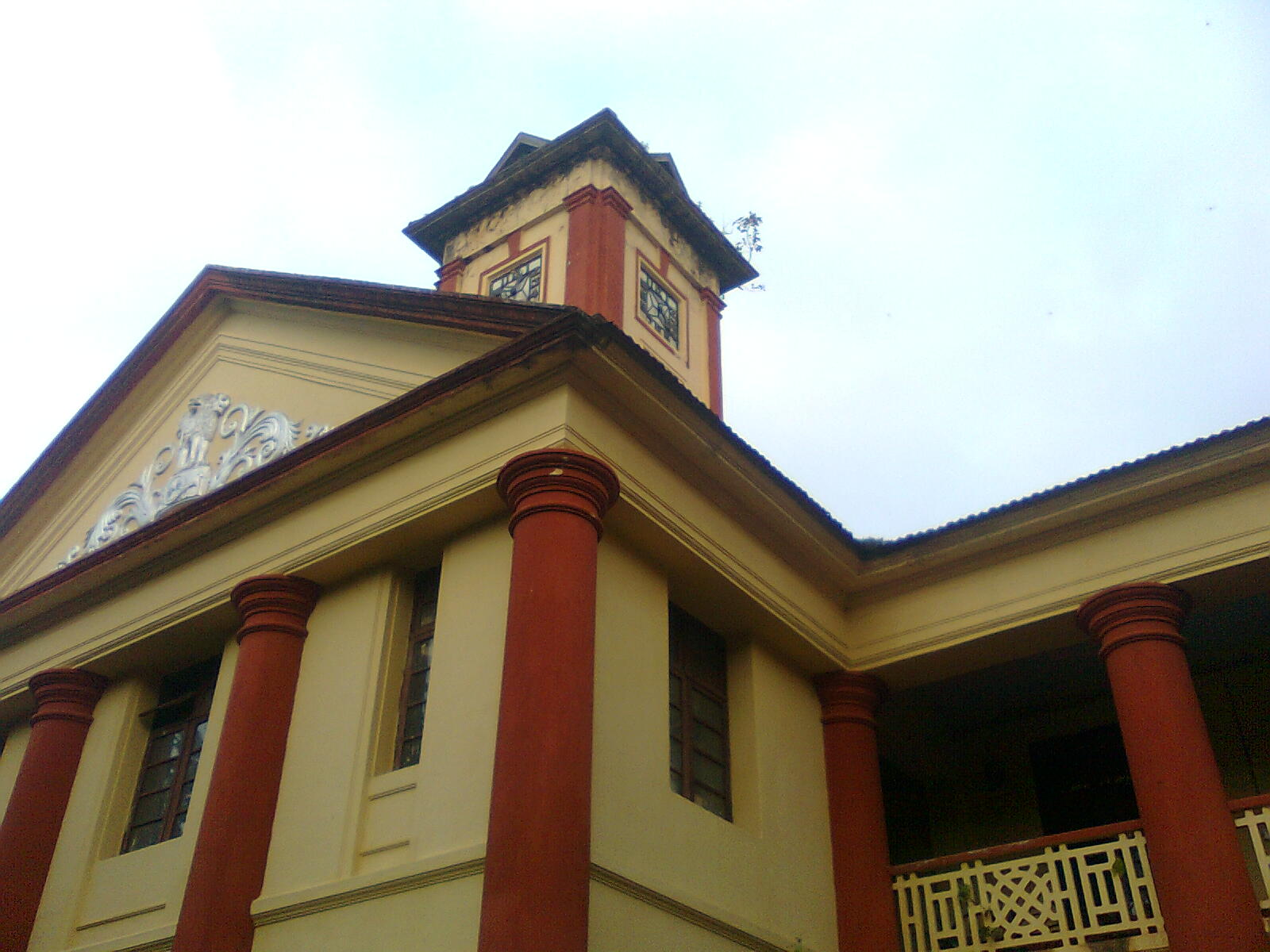
Government Victoria College, Palakkad

Indian Institute of Technology, temporary campus

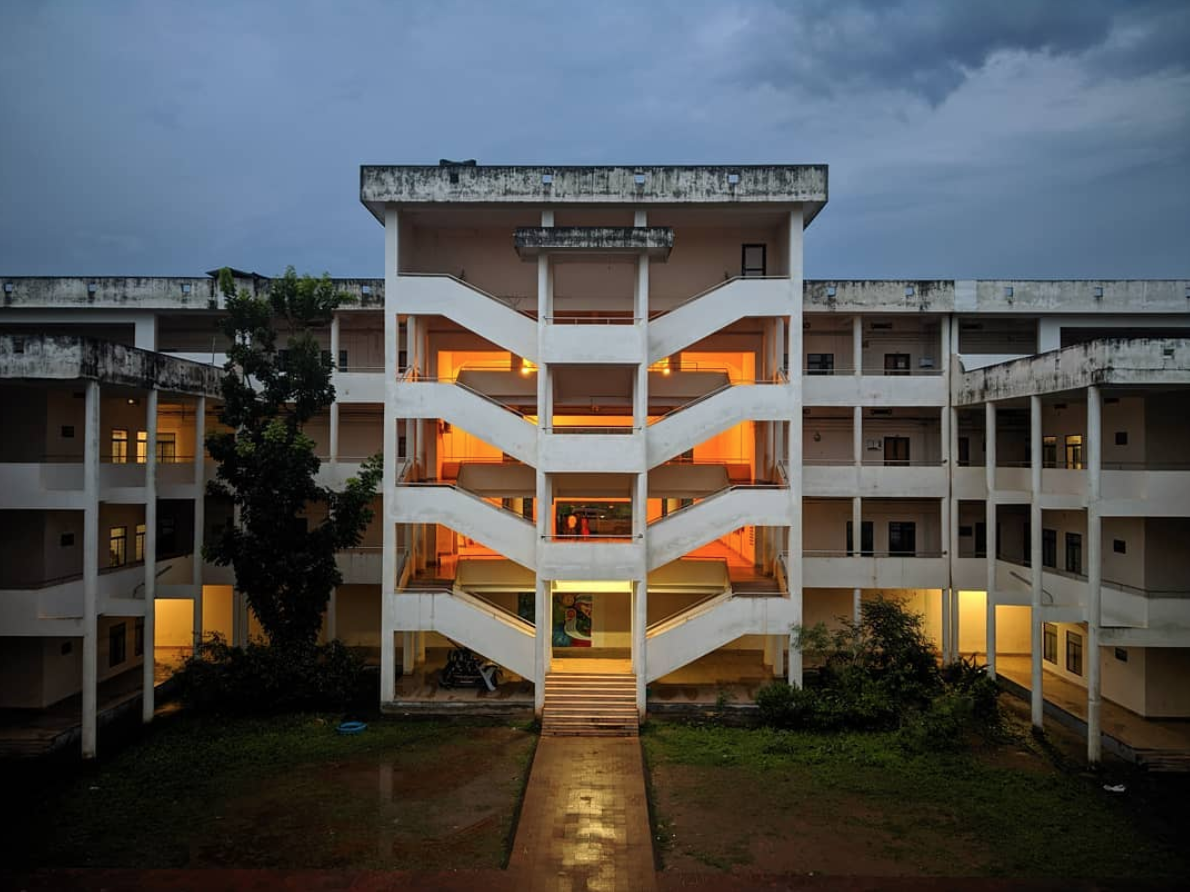
Government Engineering College, Sreekrishnapuram, Palakkad

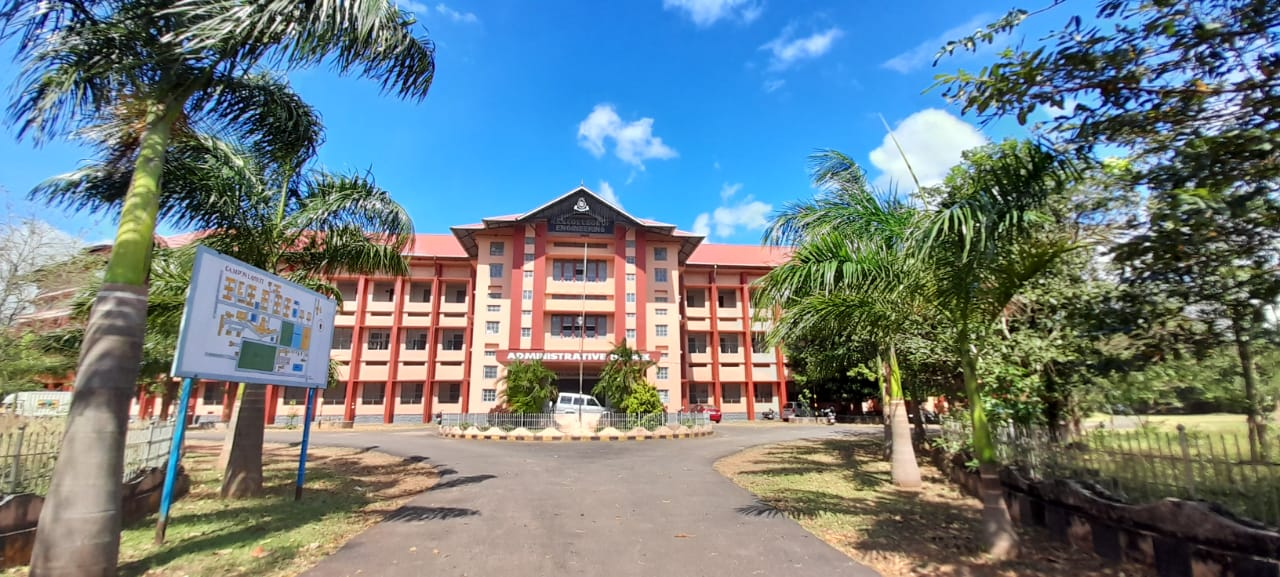
NSS College of Engineering, main building

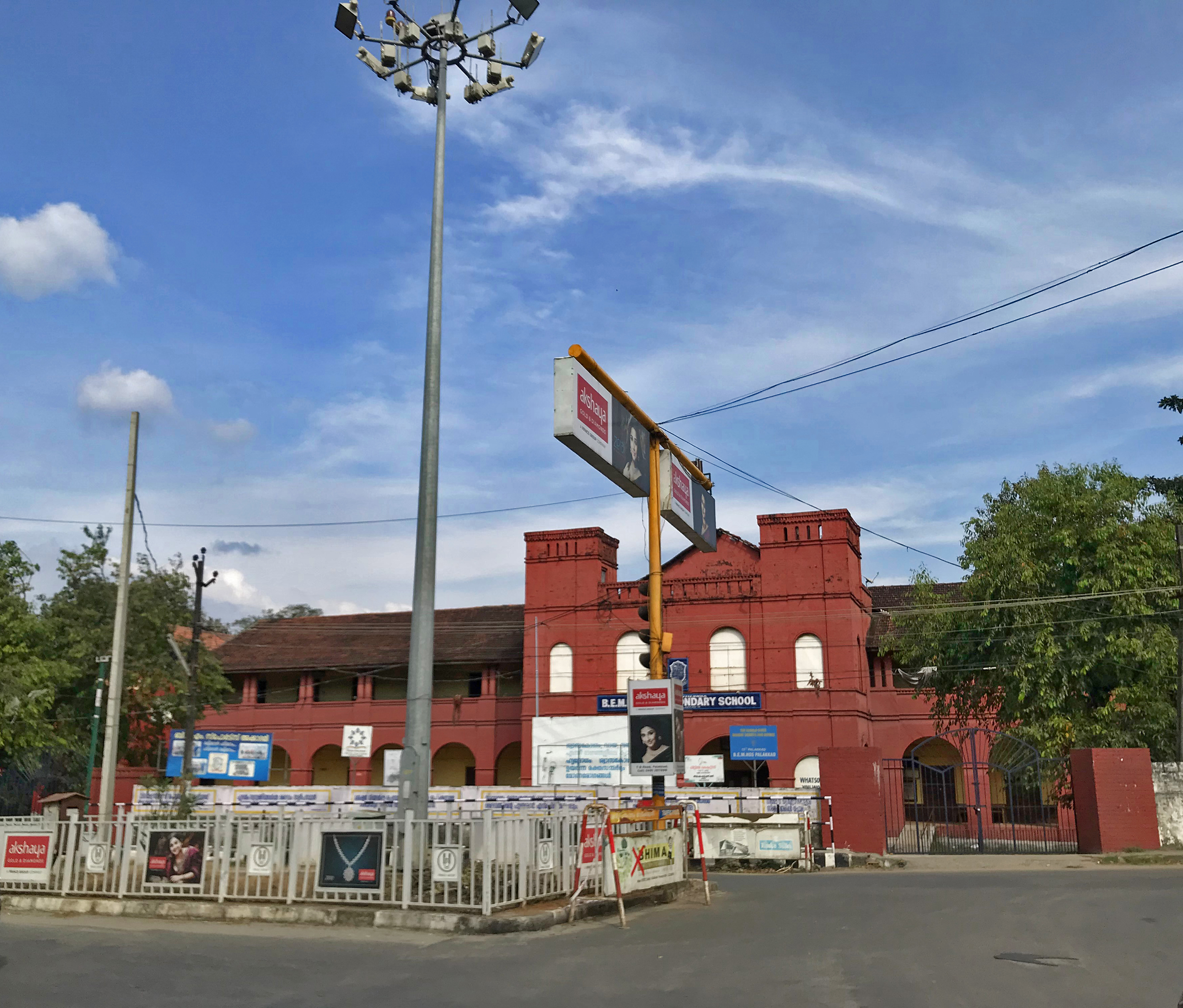
Basel Evangelical Mission Higher Secondary School, Palakkad

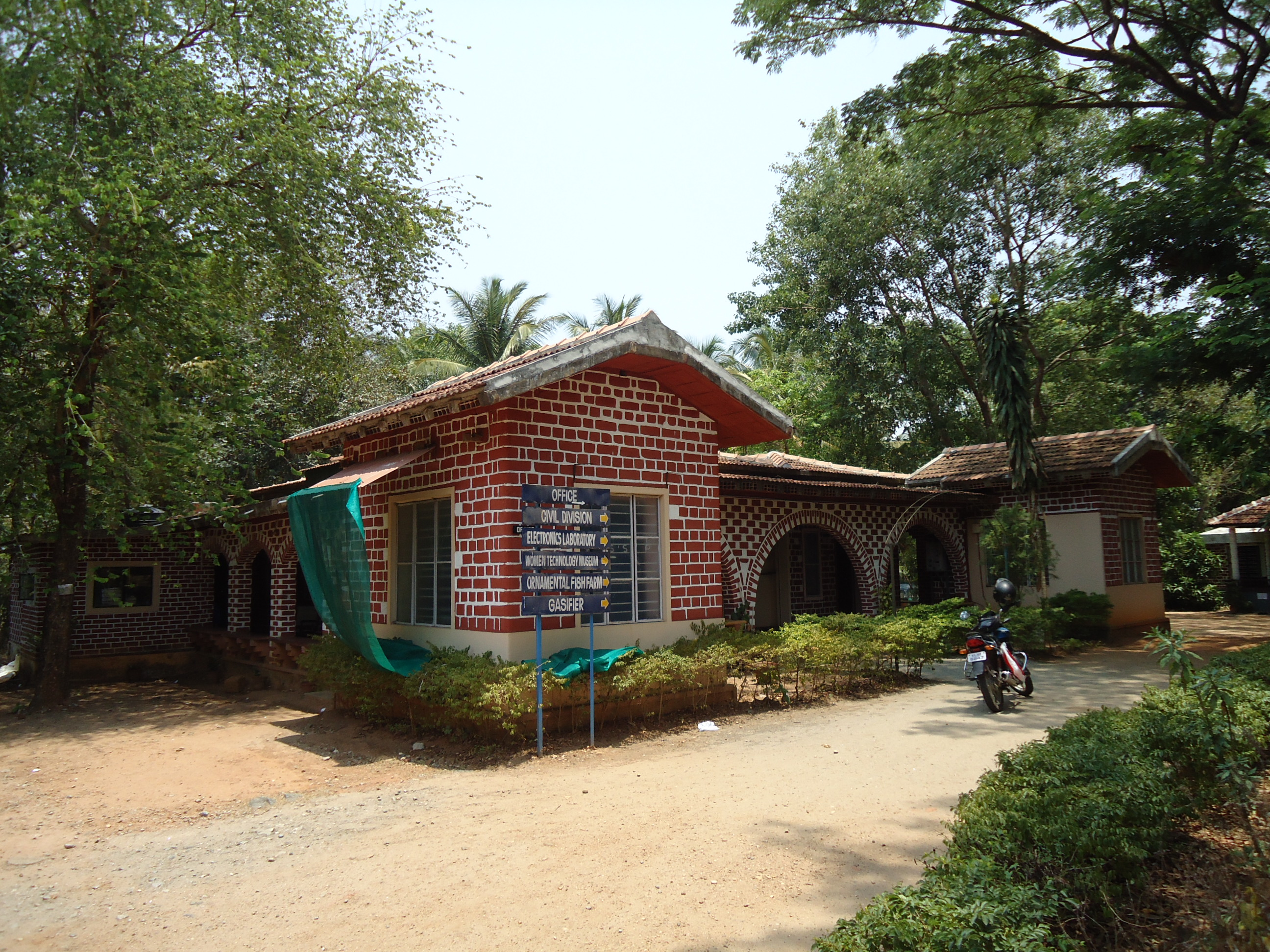
IRTC Mundur Campus

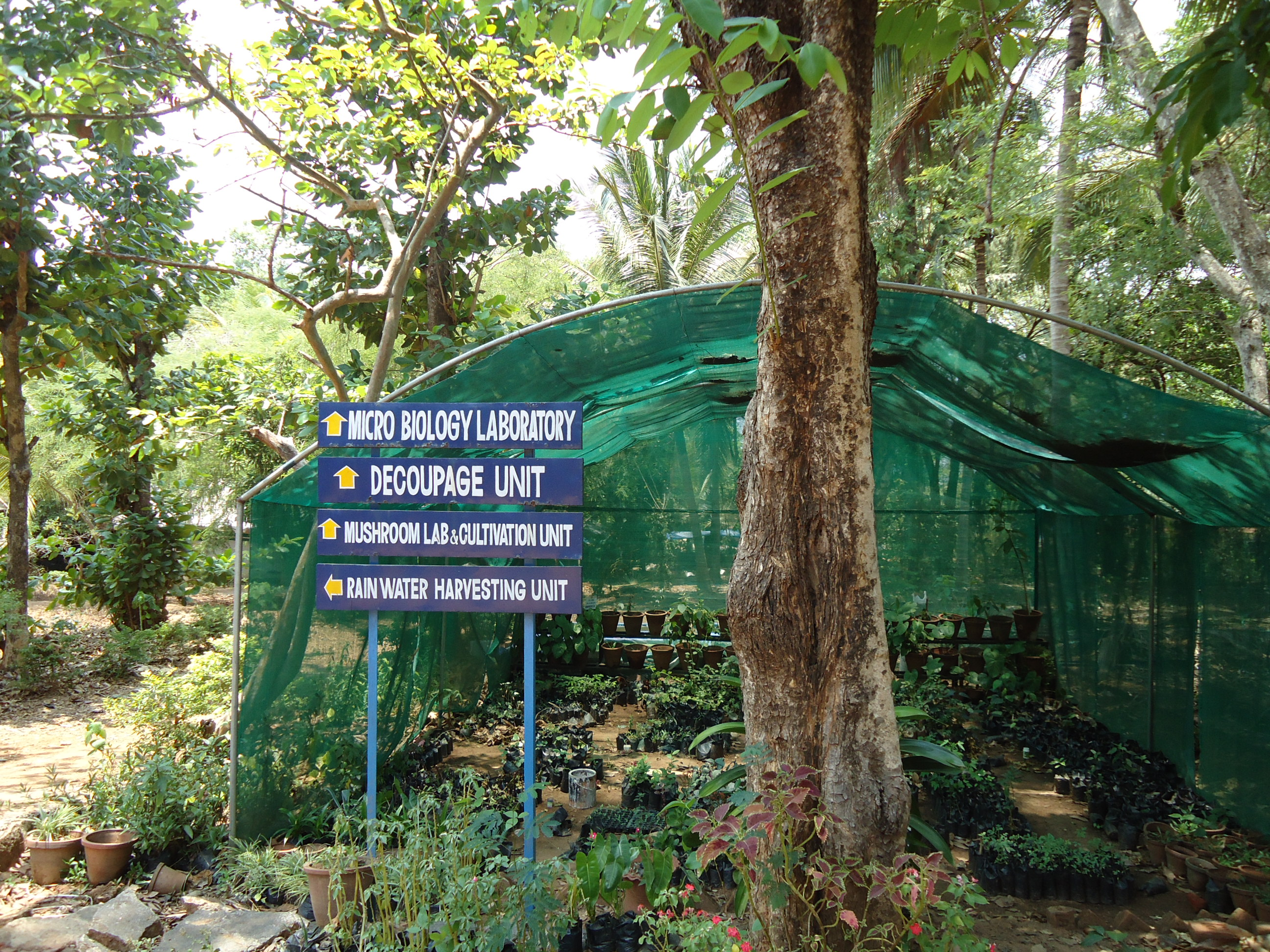
IRTC Mundur Campus

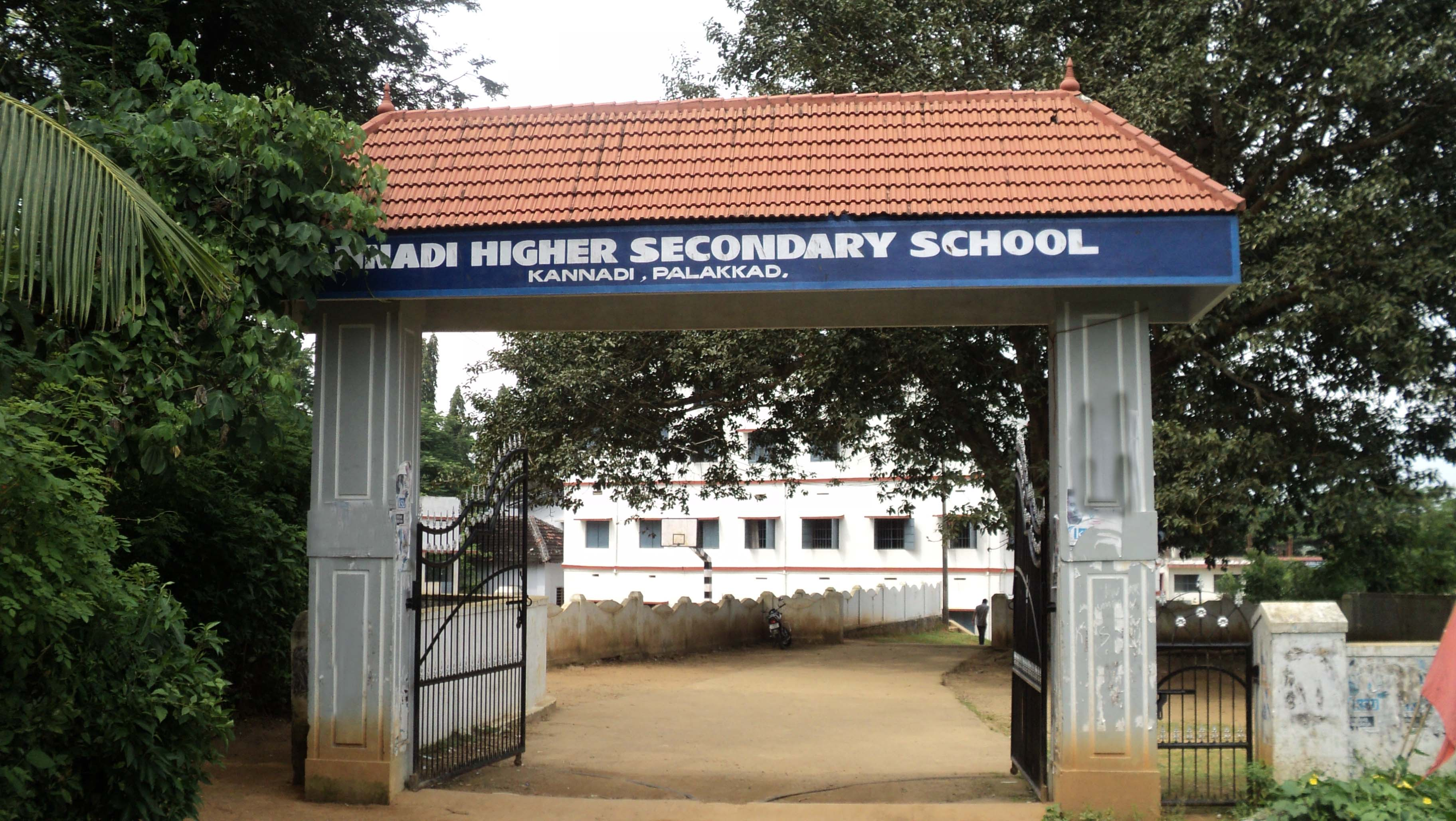
Kannadi School

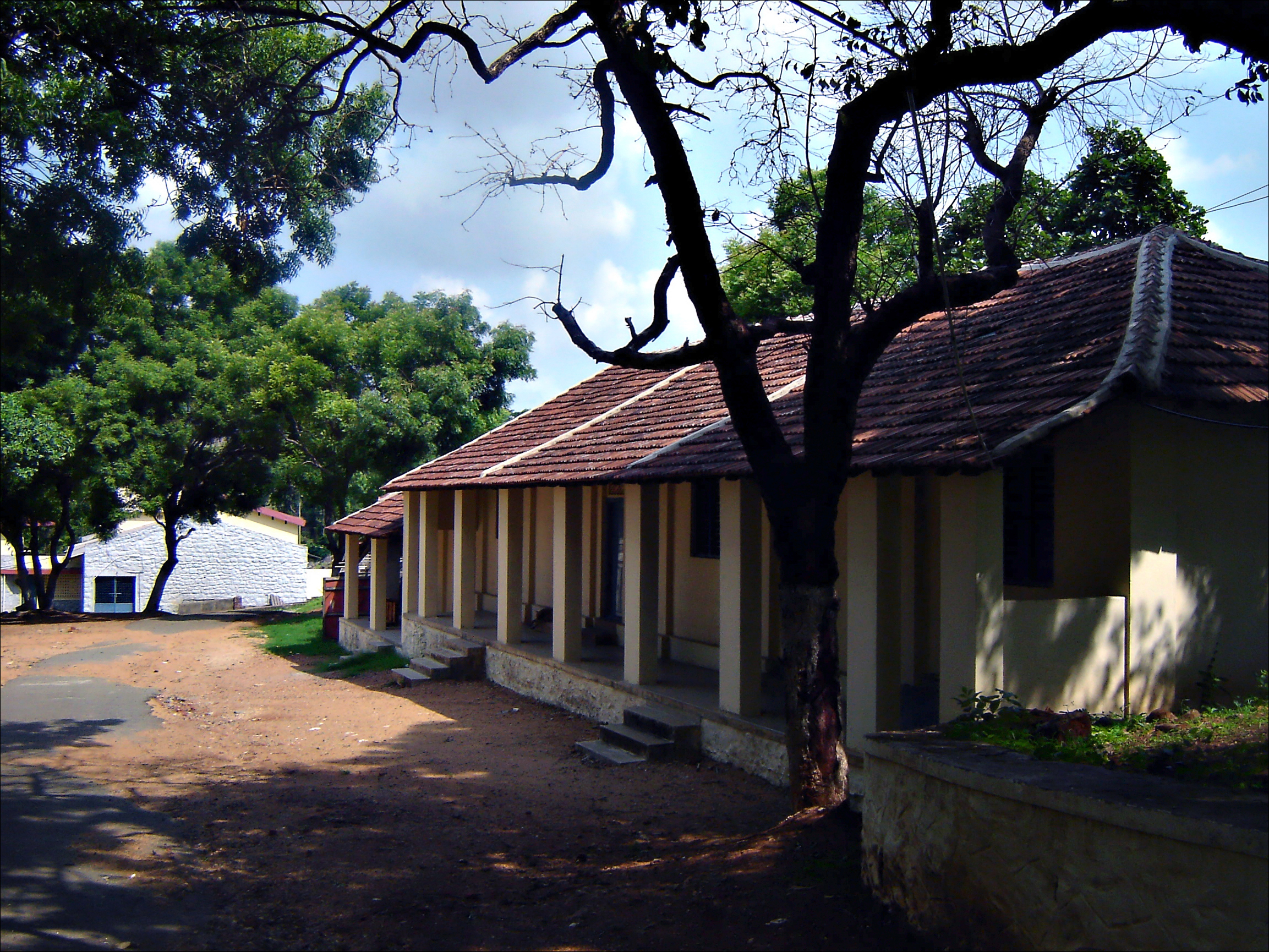
Chinmaya School

Palakkad District is one of the main centre of education in Kerala state India. It has Prominent Educational Institutions provide platform for various level of education . The district is home to the only Indian Institute of Technology in Kerala state. Palakkad District has three educational districts namely Palakkad, Ottappalam and Mannarkkad. There are several educational institutions working across the district. Government Victoria College, Palakkad, Government Engineering College, Sreekrishnapuram, NSS College of Engineering, Government Medical College, Palakkad, Chembai Memorial Government Music College, and many more higher level of educational institutions are located in Palakkad District.

== Autonomous higher education institutes ==
- Indian Institute of Technology

== Government Engineering Colleges ==
- NSS College of Engineering

== Government Polytechnic Colleges ==
- Government Polytechnic, Kodumba, Palakkad,
- Model Residential Polytechnic College Kuzhalmannam
- Institute of Printing Technology & Government Polytechnic College, Kulappully, Shoranur, 679122, Palakkad

=== Civil service ===
- Kerala State Civil Service Academy, Palakkad Subcenter
- Siva's IAS Academy, Mercy College Jn, Palakkad

=== Law ===
- Nehru Academy of Law
- V.R. Krishnan Ezhuthachan Law College, Elavanchery, Kollengode
- Al Ameen Law College Shoranur Kulappully Palakkad

=== Medical Colleges ===
- Government Medical College, Palakkad
- Karuna Medical College, Vilayodi, Palakkad
- PK DAS Institute of Medical Sciences, Ottapalam
- Kerala Medical College, Mangode, Palakkad

=== Ayurveda Medical Colleges and Institutions ===
- Ahalia Ayurveda Medical College, Palakkad
- Poomulli Neelakandan Nampoodiripad Memorial Ayurveda Medical College, Shoranur
- Santhigiri Ayurveda Medical College, Olassery Palakkad
- Vishnu Ayurveda College, Shoranur
- Regional Agricultural Research Station, Pattambi, Palakkad

=== Nursing Colleges ===
- Karuna College of Nursing, Chittur
- Seventh Day Adventist College of Nursing, Ottapalam
- SI-MET College of Nursing, Malampuzha
- SI-MET College of Nursing, Mundur

=== Dental Colleges ===
- Royal Dental College, Palakkad

=== Private Self Financing Engineering and technology Institutes ===
- Ahalia School of Engineering & Technology, Palakkad
- Al-Ameen Engineering College, Shornur, Palakkad
- Ammini College of Engineering
- Chathanmkulam Institute of Research and Advanced Studies, Menonpara
- Jawaharlal College of Engineering and Technology, Mangalam
- Prime College of Engineering
- Sreepathy Institute of Management and Technology
- NDFC Technical Institute & College for the Deaf, Shangaramangalam, Pattambi, Palakkad

=== Private Polytechnic Colleges ===
- St. Mary's Polytechnic College, Valliyode, Palakkad
- Aries Polytechnic College, Palakkad
- Malabar Polytechnic Campus, Cherpulassery, Palakkad

=== Architecture ===
- Global Institute of Architecture, Palakkad
- Sneha College of Architecture]], Govindapuram, Kollengode

=== Government Arts and Science Colleges ===
- Government Victoria College, Palakkad (est. 1888)
- Sree Neelakanta Government Sanskrit College Pattambi
- Government College, Chittur, Palakkad (est. 1947)
- Government Arts & Science College, Pathirippala, Palakkad
- Govt. Arts and Science College, Kozhinjampara
- Govt. Arts and Science College, Nattukal, Palakkad
- Rajiv Gandhi Memorial Govt Arts & Science College, Attappadi, Palakkad (est. 2012)

=== Government IHRD Colleges ===
- College of Applied Science, Vadakkencherry, Palakkad (est. 1993)
- College of Applied Science, Malampuzha, Kalleppully, Palakkad (est. 2008)
- College of Applied Science, Kuzhalmannam, Kottayi, Palakkad (est. 2008)
- College of Applied Science, Attappadi, Palakkad (est. 2010)
- College of Applied Science, Ayalur, Palakkad (est. 2012)

=== Government ITI'S ===
- Industrial training institute, Malampuzha
- ITI (W) Malampuzha
- ITI Kuzhalamnnam
- ITI Vaniyamkulam
- ITI Nemmara
- ITI Perumatty
- ITI Kozhinjampara
- ITI Elumbalassery (Lt. Col. Niranjan Memorial)

=== Arts and Science ===
- Chembai Memorial Government Music College, Palakkad (est. 2000)
- NSS College, Ottapalam, Palakkad (est. 1961)
- NSS College, Nenmara, Palakkad (est. 1967)
- MES Kalladi College, Mannarkkad (est. 1967)
- A.W.H. College of Science and Technology, Palakkad
- Institute for Communicative and Cognitive Neuro Sciences, Palakkad
- Karuna Arts and Science College, Palakkad
- M.P.M.M.S.N. Trust College, Shornur
- Mercy College, Palakkad
- Minority Arts and Science College, Padinjarangadi
- Royal Institute of Science and Technology, Palakkad
- Sadanam Kumaran College, Pathiripala
- Sree Neelakanda Govt. Sanskrit College, Pattambi
- Sree Narayana College, Alathur
- Sree Vyasa N.S.S. College, Vadakkancherry
- Sreekrishnapuram V.T. Bhattathiripad College, Mannampatta
- Thunchath Ezhuthachan College of Management, Information Technology and Biotechnology, Palakkad
- V.V. College of Science and Technology, Palakkad
- Yuvakshethra Institute of Management Studies, Palakkad

=== Teacher Training Institutes ===
- Sneha College of Teacher Education, Govindapuram, Kollengode

== High schools ==
- Bharatha Matha Higher Secondary School
- Bharathamatha CMI Public School
- Basel Evangelical Mission Higher Secondary School
- Jawahar Navodaya Vidyalaya, Palakkad
- BSS Gurukulam Higher Secondary School
- Basel Evangelical Mission Higher Secondary School, Palakkad
- Holy Trinity School, Kanjikode
- MES Pattambi
- Palghat Lions Senior Secondary school
- Moyen Memorial School, Palakkad
- Kanikkamatha Convent - English Medium Higher Secondary School
- A.S.M.H.S.S. Alathur
- Kuttikode English Medium Central School, Kuttikode, Cherpulassery
- PMGHSS, Palakkad
- Vasavi Vidhyalaya CBSE School, Palakkad
- Pandit Motilal School, Palakkad
- St. Thomas Convent School, Olavakkode
- Gvhss Cherpulassery
- Bhavan's Vidya Mandir, Chithali
- Guardian Public School, Para
- St. Raphael's Higher Secondary School, Chakkanthara
- Vyasa Vidya Peethom CBSE School
- MES Public School, Olavakkode
- Amrita Public School
- Nirmala Matha ICSE School, Malampuzha
- St. Agnes Public School
- St Francis School (ICSE)
- Sreekrishnapuram Central School

=== Medical Transcription ===
- Tranz Medisolutions
- Silicon Square

=== Music ===
- Chembai Memorial Government Music College

== See also ==
- List of colleges affiliated to the University of Calicut, some being in Palakkad district
