= Kozhinjampara (disambiguation) =

Kozhinjampara may refer to:

- Kozhinjampara, a village in Palakkad district, state of Kerala, India
- Kozhinjampara (gram panchayat), a gram panchayat that serves the above and other villages
