= K. Krishnankutty =

Indian politician (born 1944)

- കെ. കൃഷ്ണൻകുട്ടി
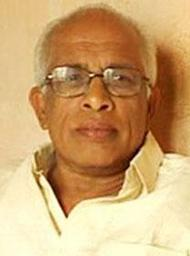

Former Minister for Electricity and ANERT, Government of Kerala
- In office 20 May 2021 – 23 May 2026
- Chief Minister: Pinarayi Vijayan
- Preceded by: M. M. Mani
- Succeeded by: Sunny Joseph

Member of the Kerala Legislative Assembly
- In office 2 June 2016 – 23 May 2026
- Preceded by: K. Achuthan
- Succeeded by: Sumesh Achuthan
- Constituency: Chittur

Minister for Water Resources, Government of Kerala
- In office 26 November 2018 – 3 May 2021
- Chief Minister: Pinarayi Vijayan
- Preceded by: P. J. Joseph
- Succeeded by: Roshy Augustine

Member of the Kerala Legislative Assembly
- In office 1991 – 1996
- Preceded by: K. A. Chandran
- Succeeded by: K. Achuthan
- Constituency: Chittur
- In office 1980 – 1987
- Preceded by: P. Shankar
- Succeeded by: K. A. Chandran
- Constituency: Chittur

Personal details
- Born: 13 August 1944 (age 82) Perumatty, Malabar District, Madras Presidency, British India (present day Palakkad, Kerala, India)
- Party: Indian Socialist Janata Dal (2026 - Present)
- Other political affiliations: Janata Dal (Secular) (till - 2026)
- Spouse: K. Vilasini
- Occupation: Politician

Kunjukutty Krishnankutty (born 13 August 1944) is an Indian politician who served as the Minister for Electricity of Kerala from 2021 to 23 May 2026. He previously served as the Minister for Water Resources of Kerala from 2018 to 2021. He was a Member of the Kerala Legislative Assembly representing Chittur from 2016 to 2026 and previously from 1991 to 1996 and from 1980 to 1987. He is a member of the Indian Socialist Janata Dal (a breakaway party of JD(S).

== Political career ==
He started his political career with the Congress party and became a KPCC member in 1969 and continued till the inception of Janata Party. He was elected to the ministry of Kerala in 2018. He is a strong supporter of Cooperative Movement in Kerala. He has previously held the responsibility of being the president of Perumatty Service Co-operative Bank, the director of Palghat District Co-operative Bank and Kerala State Co-operative Bank. He became a legislator in 6th, 7th, 9th and the 14th Kerala Legislative Assembly. He became a Minister in Pinarayi Vijayan's Ministry, after replacing Mathew T. Thomas, the legislator from Thiruvalla constituency.

He is the former Kerala State General Secretary of the Janata Dal (Secular).

== Early life ==
He was born to Kunjukutty and Janaki of Ezhuthani in Perumatty on 13 August 1944. He completed 8th standard from Government S. M. High School, Tattamangalam.

== Personal life ==
He lives with wife Vilasini and son Narayanankutty at Ezhuthani near Chittur. The couple's other children are Latha Balasai, K Ajayan and K Biju IAS, who is the director of the department of Industries and Commerce.
