= Amal College of Advanced Studies, Nilambur =

Amal College of Advanced Studies
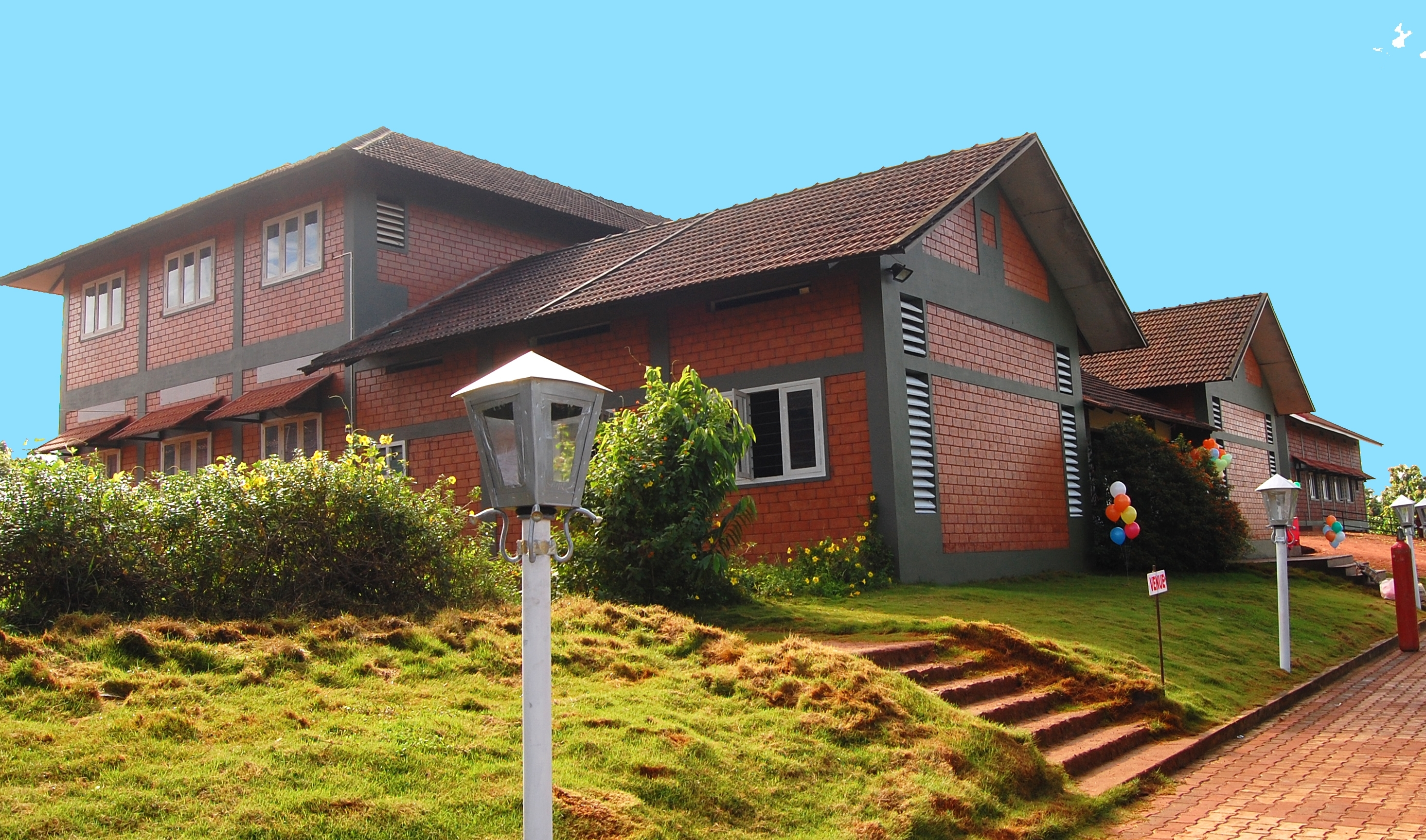
- Main block
- Motto: Education, Emancipation & Empowerment
- Type: Aided by Govt of Kerala
- Established: 2005; 21 years ago
- Affiliations: University of Calicut
- Location: Myladi Eranhimangad, Nialmbur, Kerala, 679329, India; 11.3029405°N 76.2358366°E
- Campus: Urban
- Website: www.amalcollege.ac.in
- Location within Kerala Location within India

Amal College of Advanced Studies(autonomous) is a post graduate government aided college affiliated to the University of Calicut.

== About the college ==
The college was established in 2005 by the Nilambur Muslim Orphanage Committee. The college is recognised by the UGC under 2(f) & 12(b) and declared as Minority educational institution under sec 2(g) of the NCMEI Act 2004. The college is re-accredited by NAAC A++ with cgpa of 3.59 in its second cycle of accreditation. The college achieved 4th position in the university of calicut and first in the district of malappuram on the basis of college's cgpa as on 21/09/2024. It offers eleven undergraduate programmes, one postgraduate programme and one Ph.D. in various disciplines. The college is in Shantigramam, a campus in Eranhimangad, on the banks of river Chaliyar, 4 km from Nilambur. The college and its hostels are open to all students regardless of caste, creed, colour, gender and social status. Dr. Shemeer Babu. T is the Principal in Charge of the college. Amal College has reserved 20% seats in all the courses for orphans and destitutes.

== See also ==
- Education in India
- Education in Kerala
- List of institutions of higher education in Kerala
- List of colleges affiliated to the University of Calicut
