= List of colleges affiliated to the University of Calicut =

This is a listing of the undergraduate and post-graduate colleges that are affiliated with University of Calicut as of 24 July 2018. Colleges that have establishment years listed as a range (e.g. 2003–04) are listed with the preceding year (2003).

== Kozhikode district ==
=== Arts, science, and commerce ===
- Government College, Madappally, Vatakara-2, Kozhikode (est. 1958)
- Sayyid Abdul Rahman Bafaqi Thangal Memorial (S.A.R.B.T.M). Govt. College, Koyilandy, Kozhikode (est. 1975)
- C.K.G. Memorial Government College, Perambra, Kozhikode (est. 1975)
- Government College, Kodanchery, Kozhikode (est. 1980)
- Government College, Mokeri, Kozhikode (est. 1981)
- Zamorin's Guruvayurappan College, Kozhikode (est. 1877)
- Malabar Christian College, Kozhikode (est. 1909)
- Farook College, Kozhikode (est. 1948)
- Providence Women's College, Kozhikode (est. 1952)
- St. Joseph's College, Devagiri, Kozhikode (est. 1956)
- Sree Narayana Guru College, Kozhikode (est. 1968)
- Mohamed Abdurahiman Memorial Orphanage College (MAMO), Mukkam, Kozhikode (est. 1982)
- R. Sankar Memorial SNDP Yogam Arts & Science College, Koyilandy, Kozhikode (est. 1995)
- Savithri Devi Saboo Memorial Women's College, Kozhikode (est. 1995)
- AWH Special College, Kozhikode (est. 1995)
- A.V. Abdurahiman Haji Arts and Science College, Kozhikode (est. 2002)
- MES College, Kozhikode (est. 2002)
- Dayapuram Arts and Science College for Women, Kozhikode (est. 2002)
- MET College, Kozhikode (est. 2002)
- Sree Narayana College, Vatakara, Kozhikode (est. 2003)
- Baithul Izza Arts & Science College, Kozhikode (est. 2003)
- Little Flower Institute of Social Sciences & Health, Kozhikode (est. 2003)
- M.H.E.S. College of Science & Technology, Kozhikode (est. 2003)
- Ilahiya Arts and Science College, Kozhikode (est. 2005)
- JDT Islam Arts & Science College, Kozhikode (est. 2005)
- KMO Arts & Science College, Kozhikode (est. 2005)
- M.E.S. Arts & Science College, Kozhikode (est. 2005)
- National College of Arts & Science, Kozhikode (est. 2005)
- Holy Cross Institute of Management & Technology, Kozhikode (est. 2007)
- Markaz College of Arts & Science, Kozhikode (est. 2008)
- Darul Huda Arts & Science College, Nadapuram, Kozhikode (est. 2009)
- Silver Arts & Science College, Perambra, Kozhikode (est. 2010)
- Malabar College of Arts and Science, Moodadi, Koyilandi, Kozhikode, (est. 2010)
- St. Xavier's Arts & Science College, Kozhikode (est. 2011)
- Ideal College of Arts & Science, Kuttiadi, Kozhikode (est. 2011)
- Vayalil Kunhali Haji Memorial Orphanage College of Arts & Science for Women, Mukkam, Kozhikode (est. 2012)
- MH Arts & Science College, Kuttiadi, Kozhikode (est. 2012)
- CSI Christian Muller Women's College, Vatakara, Kozhikode (est. 2012)
- Muslim Orphanages’ College of Arts and Science, Kuruvattur, Kozhikode (est. 2012)
- Co-operative Arts & Science College, Vatakara, Kozhikode (est. 2013)
- KMCT Arts & Science College, Kozhikode (est. 2013)
- Sree Gokulam Arts & Science College, Balussery, Kozhikode (est. 2013)
- Sree Narayana Guru College of Advanced Studies, Chelannur, Kozhikode (est. 2013)
- Darunnujoom College of Arts & Science, Perambra, Kozhikode
- SNES College of Arts, Commerce & Management, Kunnamangalam, Kozhikode (est. 2013)
- Peekay CICS Arts & Science College, Mathara, Kozhikode (est. 2013)
- SI Women's College of Arts and Science, Parakkadavu, Kozhikode (est. 2013)
- Don Bosco College, Mukkam, Kozhikode (est. 2013)
- CHMKM Govt. Arts & Science College, Koduvally, Kozhikode (est. 2013)
- Dr B R Ambedkar Memorial Government Arts & Science College, Balussery, Kozhikode (est. 2013)
- Govt. Arts & Science College, Nadapuram, Kozhikode (est. 2014)
- Alphonsa College, Thiruvambady, Kozhikode (est. 2014)
- Al Irshad Arts & Science College for Women, Kozhikode (est. 2014)
- Golden Hills Arts & Science College, Kozhikode (est. 2014)
- Gurudeva College of Advanced Studies, Koyilandy, Kozhikode (est. 2014)
- Kunnamangalam Govt. Arts and Science College, Chathamangalam, Kozhikode (est. 2014)
- Malabar Arts & Science College for Women, Nadapuram, Kozhikode (est. 2014)
- Mahlara Arts & Science College, Mavoor, Kozhikode (est. 2015)
- Educos Arts & Science College, Nadupoyil, Kozhikode (est. 2015)
- Hi-Tech Arts & Science College, Vattoli, Kozhikode (est. 2015)
- Malabar TMS College of Management Technology, Kunnamangalam, Kozhikode (est. 2015)
- S.M.l Arts & Science College, Vatakara, Kozhikode (est. 2015)
- PVS College of Arts & Science, Pantheerankavu, Kozhikode
- Kadathanad Arts & Science College, Vatakara, Kozhikode

=== College of Physical Education ===
- Government College of Physical Education, Kozhikode (est. 2008)

=== College of Applied Sciences ===
- CAS- (est. 1993)
- College of Applied Science, Nadapuram, Kozhikode (est. 2005)
- College of Applied Sciences, Mukkam, Kozhikode (est. 2008)
- College of Applied Science, Thamarassery, Kozhikode (est. 2012)

=== Engineering, MBA, and MCA colleges ===
- Government Engineering College, Kozhikode (est. 1999)
- College of Applied Sciences, Kozhikode- (est. 1993)
- AWH Engineering College, Kozhikode (est. 2001)
- KMCT College of Engineering, Manassery, Kozhikode (est. 2001)
- National Institute of Electronics and Information Technology (NIELIT), Calicut, Kozhikode
- Farook Institute of Management, Kozhikode (est. 2005)
- KMCT College of Engineering for Women, Mukkam, Kozhikode (est. 2009)
- SNES IMSAR (Institute of Management Studies and Research), Kunnamangalam, Kozhikode (est. 2009)
- M. Dasan Institute of Technology, Ulliyeri, Kozhikode (est. 2012)
- KMCT College of Architecture, Kallanthode, Kozhikode (est. 2013)
- KMCT College of Architecture, Manassery, Kozhikode (est. 2013)
- MES College of Architecture, Kakkodi, Kozhikode (est. 2013)
- Avani Institute of Design, Kozhikode (est. 2015)
- LEAD College of Management (Est. 2011)

=== Training colleges ===
- Govt. College of Teacher Education, Kozhikode (est. 1950)
- Farook Training College, Feroke, Kozhikode (est. 1961)
- Meppayur Salafi College of Teacher Education, Kozhikode (est. 1995)
- AWH College of Education, Kozhikode (est. 1996)
- Sree Narayana College of Teacher Education, Chelannur, Kozhikode (est. 2002)
- CICS College of Teacher Education, Kozhikode (est. 2004)
- T.I.M. Training College (Unaided), Nadapuram, Kozhikode (est. 2004)
- Bhavan's Ramakrishna Institute of Teacher Education, Kozhikode (est. 2004)
- Providence College of Teacher Education for Women, Malaparamba, Kozhikode (est. 2005)
- KMCT College of Education, Chathamangalam, Kozhikode (est. 2005)
- Mercy College of Teacher Education, Vatakara (est. 2006)
- Mother Teresa College of Teacher Education, Perambra (est. 2006)
- Oriental College of Teacher Education Kozhikode (est. 2007)
- KET College of Teacher Education, Kozhikode (est. 2007)
- SSM College of Teacher Education, Kozhikode (est. 2008)
- KMO College of Teacher Education, Koduvally, Kozhikode (est. 2010)

=== Law colleges ===
- Government Law College, Kozhikode (est. 1970)
- Markaz Law College, Kaithapoyil, Kozhikode (est. 2014)

=== Arabic / Oriental title colleges ===
- Sunniyya Arabic College, Chennamangallur, Kozhikode
- Rouzathul Uloom Arabic College, Kozhikode (est. 1942) (sister organization to Farook College)
- Rahmaniya Arabic College, Katameri, Kozhikode (est. 2002)
- Jalaliya Women's Arabic College, Kozhikode (est. 2002)
- Darul Ma-Arifa Arabic College, Puthupady, Kozhikode (est. 2003)
- Baithul Izza Arabic College, Kozhikode (est. 2005)
- Saquafathul Islam Arabic College, Kozhikode (est. 2011)
- Salafiyya Arabic College, Koyilandi, Kozhikode (est. 2012)
- Al-Furqan Arabic College, Nadapuram, Kozhikode (est. 2012)

== Malappuram district ==
=== Arts, Science, and Commerce colleges ===
- Government College, Malappuram (est. 1972)
- Pookoya Thangal Memorial Government College, Perinthalmanna, Malappuram (est. 1975)
- Thunchan Memorial Government College, Tirur, Malappuram (est. 1980)
- Govt. Arts and Science College, Nilambur, Malappuram (est. 2018)
- N.S.S College, Manjeri, Malappuram (est. 1965)
- Dr. Gafoor Memorial MES Mampad College, Malappuram (est. 1965)
- Pocker Sahib Memorial Orphanage College (PSMO College), Malappuram (est. 1968)
- M.E.S. Ponnani College, Ponnani, Malappuram (est. 1968)
- Mar Thoma College, Chungathara, Malappuram (est. 1981)
- Korambayil Ahammed Haji Memorial Unity Women's College, Manjeri, Malappuram (est. 1981)
- MES Keveeyam College, Valanchery, Malappuram (est. 1981)
- EMEA College of Arts and Science, Kumminiparamba, Malappuram (est. 1983)
- Sullamussalam Science College, Areekode, Malappuram (est. 1995)
- Amal College of Advanced Studies, Nilambur (est. 2005)
- Majlis Arts & Science College Valanchery, Malappuram (est. 1995)
- SNDP Yogam Sathabdi Smaraka College (also SNDP YSS College) Perinthalmanna, Malappuram (est. 2002)
- HM College of Science & Technology, Manjeri, Malappuram (est. 2002)
- Markaz Arts & Science College, Malappuram (est. 2003)
- K.V. Ustad Memorial Darul Hidaya Orphanage Arts & Science College For Women, Kololamba, Malappuram (est. 2003)
- Sree Vivekananda Padana Kendram Arts & Science College, Edakkara, Malappuram (est. 2003)
- Regional College of Science and Humanities, Kuzhimanna, Malappuram (est. 2003)
- Najath College of Science and Technology, Malappuram (est. 2003)
- Grace Valley College of Arts & Science, Malappuram (est. 2003)
- Vedavyasa Institute of Arts & Science, Vazhayur, Malappuram (est. 2005) – Disaffiliation Requested
- Assabah Arts and Science College, Valayamkulam, Malappuram (est. 2005)
- Kottakkal Farook Arts and Science College, Malappuram (est 2005)
- Khidmath Arts and Science College, Malappuram (est. 2005)
- SAFI Institute of Advanced Study, Vazhayur, Malappuram (est. 2005)
- Gems Arts & Science College, Ramapuram, Malappuram (est. 2008)
- Sree Sastha College, Malappuram (est. 2008)
- Ma'din Arts and Science College, Melmuri, Malappuram (est. 2008)
- Safa College of Arts and Science, Malappuram (est. 2009)
- Hikamiyya Arts & Science College, Pathiriyal, Malappuram (est. 2009)
- Ideal College for Advanced Studies, Thavanoor, Malappuram (est. 2010)
- Al Jamia Arts & Science College, Malappuram (est. 2010)
- St. Mary's College, Angadippuram, Malappuram (est. 2010)
- Blossom Arts & Science College, Kondotty, Malappuram (est. 2011)
- Noble Women's College, Manjeri, Malappuram (est. 2011)
- Pravasi Arts & Science College, Malappuram (est. 2011)
- IKT Memorial Arts & Science College, Malappuram (est. 2012)
- Priyadarsini Arts & Science College, Ernad, Malappuram (est. 2012)
- Bafakhy Yatheem Khana Arts & Science College for Women, Malappuram (est. 2012)
- CPA College of Arts and Science, Puthanathani, Malappuram (est. 2012)
- MIC Arts & Science College, Valluvambram, Malappuram (est. 2012)
- Nasra College of Arts & Science, Thirurkad, Malappuram (est. 2012)
- ISS Arts & Science College, Perinthalmanna, Malappuram (est. 2012)
- CH Muhammed Koya Memorial Govt. Arts & Science College, Tanur, Malappuram (est. 2013)
- Sahya Arts and Science College, Wandoor, Malappuram (est. 2013)
- Panakkad Pookoya Thangal Memorial Arts & Science College, Vengara, Malappuram (est. 2013)
- Malabar College of Commerce & Science, Malappuram (est. 2013)
- Malabar College of Advanced Studies, Vengara, Malappuram (est. 2013)
- Government Arts & Science College, Kondotty, Malappuram (est. 2013)
- Govt. Arts & Science College, Mankada, Kolathur, Malappuram (est. 2013)
- Eranad Knowledge City College of Commerce and Sciences, Manjeri, Malappuram
- JM College of Arts & Science, Tirur, Malappuram
- Moulana College of Arts & Science & Commerce, Tirur, Malappuram (est. 2013)
- KMCT Arts & Science College, Kuttippuram, Malappuram (est. 2013)
- Fathima Arts & Science College, Nilambur, Malappuram
- MES Arts and Science College, Nilambur, Malappuram – no longer functioning
- Mohammed Ali Shihab Thangal Memorial Arts and Science College (MSTM), Perinthalmanna, Malappuram
- MES Arts and Science College, Perinthalmanna, Malappuram
- Government Arts and Science College, Post, Malappuram (est. 2014)
- Women's Islamiya Arts and Science College, Punnappala Post, Malappuram (est. 2014)
- M.T.M College of Arts, Science and Commerce, Ponnani Taluk, Malappuram (est. 2014)
- Ambedkar College of Arts and Science, Wandoor, Malappuram (est. 2014)
- KR's Sree Narayana College, Valanchery, Malappuram (est. 2014)
- Panakkad Mohamedali Shihab Thangal Arts and Science College, Nannambra, Malappuram (est. 2015)
- Vedavyasa College of Arts and Science, Eranad Taluk, Malappuram (est. 2015)
- Jamia Islamiya Arts and Science College, Manjeri, Malappuram (est. 2015)
- MAO College of Arts and Science, Elayur, Malappuram (est. 2015)
- Government Arts and Science College for Women, Downhill, Malappuram (est. 2015)
- Sayyid Muhammad Ali Shihab Thangal Memorial Arts and Science Women's College, Malappuram
- Luminous Arts and Science College, Malappuram
- Ability Arts & Science College for Hearing Impaired, Valiyaparamba, Malappuram

=== College of Applied Sciences ===
These colleges are managed by Institute of Human Resources Development (IHRD):

- College of Applied Science, Munduparamba, Malappuram (est. 1993)
- college of applied science calicut (est 1993)
- College of Applied Sciences, Edappal, Malappuram (est. 2005)
- College of Applied Sciences, Vazhakkad, Malappuram (est. 2005)
- College of Applied Sciences, Ernad Taluk, Malappuram (est. 2010)
- Model Degree College, Parappanangadi, Malappuram (est. 2015)

=== Engineering, MBA, and MCA colleges ===
- MEA Engineering College, Perinthalmanna, Malappuram (est. 2002)
- Vedavyasa Institute of Technology, Karadparamba, Malappuram (est. 2004)
- Devaki Amma's Guruvayurappan College of Architecture, Malappuram (est. 2010)
- Alsalama Institute of Architecture, Perinthalmanna, Malappuram (est. 2011)
- Cochin College of Engineering and Technology, Valanchery, Malappuram (est. 2012)
- Talent Institute of Management Studies, Edappal, Malappuram (est. 2013)
- Eranad Knowledge City Technical Campus (EKC), Cherukulam, Manjeri, Malappuram
- Vedavyasa College of Architecture, Karadparamba, Malappuram (est. 2014)
- Eranad Knowledge City College of Architecture, Cherukulam, Manjeri, Malappuram (est. 2014)
- Talent Institute of Architecture, Malappuram (est. 2015)
- Monti International Institute of Management Studies, Angadippuram, Malappuram (est. 2015)

=== Training colleges ===
- Markaz Training College, Karthala, Malappuram (est. 1995)
- MCT Training College, Melmuri, Malappuram (est. 1995)
- KPPM College of Teacher Education, Anakkayam, Malappuram (est. 2002)
- Devaki Amma Memorial College of Teacher Education, Chelembra, Malappuram (est. 2002)
- Kunhathumma Memorial College of Teacher Education, Valillapuzha, Malappuram (est. 2003)
- Sree Vivekananda College of Teacher Education, Edakkara, Malappuram (est. 2004)
- Moulana College of Teacher Education, Kuttayi, Malappuram (est. 2004)
- Farook B.Ed College, Kottakkal, Malappuram (est. 2004)
- Bafakhy Yatheemkhana B.Ed Training College, Kalpakanchery, Malappuram (est. 2004)
- Majma’a Training College, Kavanur, Malappuram (est. 2004)
- EMEA Training College, Kondotty, Malappuram (est. 2004)
- Sullamussalam College of Teacher Education, Malappuram (est. 2004)
- ISS College of Teacher Education, Perinthalmanna, Malappuram (est. 2006)
- M.I Training College, Malappuram (est. 2006)
- Darul Uloom Training College, Vazhakkad, Malappuram (est. 2006)

=== Law colleges ===
- Bhavan's N.A. Palkhivala Academy for Advanced Legal Studies and Research (est. 2012)
- KMCT Law College, Valanchery, Malappuram (est. 2013)
- MCT College of Legal Studies, Melmuri, Malappuram (est. 2015)

=== Arabic / Oriental title colleges ===
- Ansar arabic college, Valavannur, Malappuram
- Darul Uloom Arabic College, Vazhakkad, Malappuram (est. 1973)
- Anvarul Islam Arabic College, Kizhuparamba, Malappuram (est. 1972)
- Sullamussalam Arabic College, Malappuram (est. 1949)
- Anwarul Islam Women's Arabic College Mongam, Malappuram (est. 1970)
- Isha – Athul Islam Arabic College, Parappanangadi, Malappuram (est. 2003)
- Falahiya Arabic College, Down Hill, Malappuram (est. 2003)
- Al-Hidayath Arabic College, Malappuram (est. 2003)
- Assabah Arabic College, Malappuram (est. 2003)
- Ilahiya Arabic College, Tirurkad, Malappuram (est. 2010)
- KMMMO Arabic College, Thirurangadi, Malappuram (est. 2010)
- Jamia Nadawiyya Women's Arabic College, Edavanna, Malappuram (est. 2012)
- Shareeath College for Women, Thenhipalam, Malappuram
- Safa Arabic College, Pookkattiri, Edayur

== Palakkad district ==
=== Science, bca, and Commerce colleges ===
- Government Victoria College, Palakkad (est. 1888)
- Sree Neelakanta Government Sanskrit College Pattambi (est. 1911)
- Government College, Chittur, Palakkad (est. 1947)
- Chembai Memorial Government Music College, Palakkad (est. 2000)
- Govt. Arts and Science College, Nattukal, Palakkad
- Rajiv Gandhi Memorial Govt Arts & Science College, Attappadi, Palakkad (est. 2012)
- NSS College, Ottapalam, Palakkad (est. 1961)
- Government Arts & Science College, Pathirippala, Palakkad
- Mercy College, Palakkad, (est. 1964)
- NSS College, Nenmara, Palakkad (est. 1967)
- MES Kalladi College, Mannarkkad, Palakkad (est. 1967)
- Sree Narayana College, Palakkad (est. 1970)
- MPMMSN Trust College, Shornur, Palakkad (est. 1981)
- Sreekrishnapuram VT Bhattathiripad College, Mannampatta, Palakkad (est. 1982)
- V V College of Science and Technology Kanjikode, Palakkad (est. 2002)
- Thunchath Ezhuthachan College, Palakkad (est. 2003)
- AWH College of Science and Technology, Anakkara, Palakkad (est. 2005)
- Yuvakshetra Institute of Management Studies (YIMS), Ezhakkad, Mundur, Palakkad (est. 2005)
- Minority Arts & Science College Padinharangadi, Palakkad (est. 2005)
- Mount Seena College of Arts & Science, Ottappalam, Palakkad (est. 2009)
- Cherpulassery College of Science and Technology for Women, Palakkad (est. 2010)
- MES College, Pattambi, Palakkad (est. 2011)
- Aspire College of Advanced Studies, Thrithala, Palakkad (est. 2012)
- Sadanam Kumaran College, Mankara, Palakkad (est. 2012)
- SNES Kallyani College, Karmpuzha, Ottapalam, Palakkad (est. 2013)
- Nethaji Memorial Arts & Science College, Nemmara, Palakkad (est. 2013)
- Sree Narayana Guru College of Advanced Studies, Alathur, Palakkad (est. 2013)
- Govt. Arts & Science College, Thrithala, Palakkad (est. 2013)
- Royal College of Arts & Science, Thrithala, Palakkad (est. 2013)
- AMC Group of Educational Institutions, Ottapalam, Palakkad (est. 2014)
- KSHM Arts & Science College, Edathanattukara, Palakkad (est. 2014)
- Najath Arts & Science College, Mannarkkad, Palakkad (est. 2014)
- Universal College of Arts & Science, Mannarkkad, Palakkad (est. 2015)
- Bharathamatha College of Arts & Science, Kozhinjampara, Palakkad (est. 2015)
- Lement College of Advanced Studies, Mele Pattambi, Palakkad (est. 2015)
- Nucleus College of Arts & Science, Pattambi, Palakkad (est. 2015)
- Lions Educational Trust College, Alathur Taluk, Palakkad (est. 2015)
- The Elegant Arts & Science College, Kodunthirapully, Palakkad (est. 2015)
- N.S.S Arts and Science College, Parakulam, Palakkad
- Devamatha College of Advanced Studies, Kanjirapuzha, Palakkad
- SEEDAC College of Arts and Science, Mannarkkad, Palakkad
- St. Alphonsa College, Anamooli, Mannarkkad, Palakkad
- Ideal Arts & Science College, Cherpulassery, Palakkad

=== College of Applied Science ===
- College of Applied Science, Vadakkencherry, Palakkad (est. 1993)
- College of Applied Science, Malampuzha, Kalleppully, Palakkad (est. 2008)
- College of Applied Science, Kuzhalmannam, Kottayi, Palakkad (est. 2008)
- College of Applied Science, Attappadi, Palakkad (est. 2010)
- College of Applied Science, Ayalur, Palakkad (est. 2012)

=== Engineering and MCA colleges ===
- Govt. Engineering College, Sreekrishnapuram, Mannampatta, Palakkad (est. 1999)
- Al-Ameen Engineering College, Shornur, Palakkad (est. 2003)
- Jawaharlal College of Engineering and Technology, Palakkad (est. 2008)
- Prime College of Engineering, Palakkad (est. 2009)
- Sreepathy Institute of Management & Technology (SIMAT), Kootanad, Palakkad (est. 2009)
- Palakkad Institute of Science and Technology, Muthalamada, Palakkad (est. 2009)
- Ammini College of Engineering, Kannampariyaram, Mankara, Palakkad (est. 2010)
- Lead College of Management, Dhoni, Palakkad (est. 2010)
- Chathamkulam Institute of Research and Advanced Studies, Palakkad (est. 2011)
- Sneha College of Architecture, Attayampathy, Kollengode (est. 2012), and recognized by the Council of Architecture (CoA).
- Ahalia School of Engineering & Technology, Kozhipara, Pudussery, Palakkad (est. 2012)
- Aryanet Institute of Technology, Vallikkad, Mundur, Palakkad (est. 2012)
- Global Institute of Architecture, Nagripuram. Pathiripala, Palakkad (est. 2013)
- Ahalia School of Management, Kozhippara, Palakkad (est. 2013)
- Nehru College of Architecture, Lakkidi, Mangalam, Palakkad (est. 2015)

=== Training colleges ===
- NSS Training College, Ottappalam, Palakkad (est. 1960)
- Holy Family College of Education for Women, Palakkad (est. 1995)
- Sree Narayana College of Teacher Education, Sreekrishnapuram, Palakkad (est. 2002)
- Sree Swamy Vivekananda Centre of Teacher Education, Ottapalam, Palakkad (est. 2004)
- Ezhuthachan Training College, Mannapra, Palakkad (est. 2004)
- Salafiyya Training College, Vilayur, Palakkad (est. 2004)
- BSS B.Ed Training College, Alathur, Palakkad (est. 2005)
- M.E.S Kappungal Saydalavi Haji Memorial Training College, Edathanattukara, Palakkad (est. 2005)
- Ideal Training College, Cherpulassery, Palakkad (est. 2006)
- Sneha College of Teacher Education, Attayampathy, Govindapuram, Palakkad (est. 2006)
- Indu Memorial Teacher Training Centre, Kuzhalmannam, Palakkad (est. 2007)
- Bharatheeya Vidya Nikethan College of Teacher Education, Kallekad, Palakkad (est. 2009)

=== Arabic / Oriental title colleges ===
- Salafiyya Arabic College, Karinganad, Palakkad (est. 2003)
- Markaz Oriental College, Ottapalam, Palakkad (est. 2003)
- Islamiya Arabic College Alathur, Palakkad (est. 2003) – last CPA in 2009. No CPA since
- Al-Abrar Oriental Arabic College, Koduvalikkundu, Mannarkkad, Palakkad

=== Law colleges ===
- V.R Krishnan Ezhuthachan Law College, Nanmara, Palakkad (est. 2014) – conditional affiliation
- Nehru Academy of Law, Lakkidi, Mangalam, Palakkad (est. 2015)
- Al-Ameen Law College, Kulappully, Shoranur, Palakkad (est. 2015)

== Thrissur district ==
=== Arts, Science, and Commerce colleges ===
- Christ College, Irinjalakuda, Thrissur (est. 1956)
- St. Thomas College, Thrissur (est. 1919 as college)
- St. Joseph's College, Irinjalakuda, Thrissur (est. 1964) (Note: Although the report on St. Joseph's College, Irinjalakuda shows est. date of 1956, the school self-reports est. date of 1964)
- Vimala College, Thrissur (estd. 1967)
- St. Aloysius College, Thrissur (est. 1968)
- Sree Kerala Varma College, Kanattukara, Thrissur (est. 1947)
- St. Mary's College, Thrissur (est. 1946)
- Little Flower College, Guruvayoor, Thrissur (est. 1955)
- Sree Krishna College, Guruvayur, Thrissur (est. 1964)
- Sacred Heart College Chalakudy, Thrissur (est. 1980)
- Carmel College, Mala, Thrissur (est. 1981)
- Sree Narayana College, Nattika, Thrissur (est. 1967)
- Prajyothi Niketan College, Pudukad, Thrissur (est. 1995)
- Mar Dionysius College, Pazhanji, Thrissur (est. 1982)
- Sri C. Achutha Menon Government College, Kuttanellur, Thrissur (est. 1972)
- MES Asmabi College, P. Vemballur, Thrissur (est. 1968)
- Sri Vyasa NSS College, Vyasagiri, Wadakkancherry, Thrissur (est. 1967)
- Sree Vivekananda College, Kunnamkulam, Thrissur (est. 1981)
- Government College of Fine Arts, Thrissur (est. 1910)
- Sree Rama Varma Govt. College of Music & Performing Arts, Thrissur (est. 1910)
- Don Bosco College, Mannuthy, Thrissur (est. 2005)
- Chetana College of Media and Performing Arts, Chiyyaram, Thrissur (est. 2015)
- St.Joseph's Arts and Science College, Pavaratty, Thrissur (est. 2015)
- Sahrdaya College of Advanced Studies for Arts and Science, Kodakara, Thrissur (est. 2011)
- Nirmala College of Arts and Science, Kunnappilly, Meloor, Chalakudy, Thrissur (est. 2014)
- Govt. Arts & Science College, Ollur, Thrissur (est. 2014)
- Sree Narayana Guru College of Advanced Studies, Nattika, Chavakkad, Thrissur
- Panampilly Memorial Govt. College, Chalakkudy, Potta, Thrissur (est. 1975)
- KKTM Govt, College, Pullut, Thrissur (est. 1965)
- Naipunnya Institute of Management & Information Technology, Koratty, Thrissur (est. 2002)
- Mother Arts & Science College, Peruvallu, Thrissur (est. 2002)
- A.C. Kunhumon Haji Memorial ICA College for Women's, Thrissur (est. 2002)
- Ansar Women's College, Perumpilavu, Thrissur (est. 2002)
- Tharananellur Arts and Science College, Irinjalakuda, Mukundapuram, Thrissur
- Paramekkavu College of Arts & Science, Ayyanthole, Thrissur
- St. Terasa's Arts & Science College, Mala, Thrissur
- Mar Osthatheos College, Perumpilavu, Thrissur
- Divine Institute of Media Science (DiMS), Muringoor, Thrissur
- Govt. Arts & Science College, Chelakkara, Thrissur
- Elims College of Arts and Science, Ponganakadu, Kurichikara, Thrissur (est. 2014)
- Sree Narayana Guru College of Advanced Studies, Vazhukumpara, Chuvannamannu, Thrissur (est. 2014)
- MET's College of Advanced Studies, Kurivilassery PO, Mala, Thrissur (est. 2015)
- Sree Gokulam College of Arts & Science, Pazhuvil West, Thrissur.
- Lakshmi Narayana Arts and Science College, Mayannur, Kondazhy, Thrissur

=== College of Physical Education ===
- Christ College of Physical Education, Irinjalakuda, Thrissur (est. 2011)

=== College of Applied Sciences ===
- College of Applied Sciences, Nattika, Thrissur (est. 2005)
- College of Applied Sciences, Chelakkara, Thrissur (est. 2008)
- College of Applied Sciences, Kodungallur, Thrissur (est. 2010)

=== Engineering, MBA, and MCA colleges ===
- Government Engineering College, Thrissur (est. 1958)
- Christ College of Engineering, Irinjalakuda, Thrissur (est. 2015)
- Jyothi Engineering College, Cheruthuruthy, Thrissur (est. 2002)
- Sahrdaya College of Engineering and Technology, Kodakara, Thrissur (est. 2002)
- Thejus Engineering College, Thrissur (est. 2009)
- IES College of Engineering, Chittilappilly, Thrissur (est. 2003)
- Nirmala College of Engineering, Chalakudy, Thrissur (est. 2011)
- MET's School of Engineering, Mala, Thrissur (est. 2002)
- Nehru College of Engineering and Research Centre, Pampadi, Thrissur (est. 2002)
- Royal College of Engineering & Technology, Akkikkavu, Thrissur (est. 2003)
- Vidya Academy of Science and Technology, Thalakkottukara, Thrissur (est. 2003)
- Institute of Management & Technology, Pottore, Thrissur (est. 2004)
- Elijah Institute of Management Studies, Kurichikkara, Thrissur (est. 2004)
- Holy Grace Academy of Management Studies, Mala, Thrissur (est. 2005)
- Malabar College of Engineering and Technology, Wadakkanchery, Thrissur (est. 2009)
- Holy Grace Academy of Engineering for Women, Mala, Thrissur (est. 2010)
- Universal Engineering College, Vallivattom, Konathukunnu, Kodungallur, Thrissur (est. 2011)
- IES College of Architecture, Chittilappilly, Thrissur (est. 2012)
- Naipunnya Institute of Management and Information Technology, Koratty, Thrissur
- MET’S School of Management Studies, Mala, Thrissur (est. 2013)
- Focus Institute of Science and Technology, Poomala, Thrissur (est. 2014)
- Thejus College of Architecture, Vellarakkad, Thrissur (est. 2014)
- Sahrdaya Institute of Management Studies, Kodakara, Thrissur (est. 2015)

=== Law colleges ===
- Government Law College, Thrissur
- Ambookan Ittoop Memorial (AIM) College of Law, Poyya, Mala, Thrissur

=== Training colleges ===
- Institute of Advanced Study in Education (Govt.), Thrissur (est. 1945)
- St. Joseph's Training College, Pavaratty, Thrissur (est. 2004)
- JPE Training College, Koorkanchery, Thrissur (est. 1995)
- Jesus Training College, Mala, Thrissur (est. 1995)
- Navajyothi College of Teacher Education, Olarikkara, Thrissur (est. 2002)
- Euphrasia Training College, Irinjalakuda, Thrissur (est. 2004)
- Dr. Palpu Memorial SNDP Yogam College of Education, Kodungallur, Thrissur (est. 1995)
- Arafa Institute for Teacher Education, Attur, Thrissur (est. 2004)
- Sree Vivekananda Teacher Education Centre, Akkikavu, Thrissur (est. 2004)
- Ideal Educational Society Training College, Chittilappilly, Thrissur (est. 2004) – disaffiliated
- Ansar Training College for Women, Karikkad, Thrissur (est. 2004)
- Mar Osthatheos Training College, Kunnamkulam, Thrissur (est. 2004)
- Hindi Prachara Kendra College of Teacher Education, Kodungallur, Thrissur (est. 2006)
- Vikram Sarabhai B.Ed College, Kaipamangalam, Thrissur (est. 2008)
- Namboodiris College of Teacher Education, Irinjalakuda, Thrissur (est. 2009)

=== Hindi / Oriental title colleges ===
- Thaqwa Afzal-Ul-Ulama Arabic College (Women's’ Arabic College), Andathode, Thrissur (est. 2005)
- Busthanul Uloom Arabic College, Koprakalam, Kaipamangalam, Thrissur (est. 2014)

== Wayanad district ==
=== Arts, science, and commerce ===
- NMSM Government College, Kalpetta, Wayanad (est. 1981)
- St Mary's College, Sulthan Bathery, Wayanad (est. 1965)
- Pazhassi Raja College, Pulpally, Bathery(est. 1982)
- Oriental School of Hotel Management, Lakkidi, Wayanad (est. 2004)
- Oriental College of Hotel Management and Culinary Arts, Vythiri, Wayanad (est. 2005)
- Don Bosco College, Sultan Bathery, Wayanad (est. 2005)
- CM College of Arts and Science Nadavayal, Wayanad (est. 2009)
- SNDP Yogam Arts & Science College, Pulpally, Wayanad (est. 2010)
- Alphonsa Arts & Science College, Sultan Bathery, Wayanad (est. 2013)
- Jayasree Arts and Science College, Kalanadikolli, Pulpally, Wayanad (est. 2015)
- Eldho Mor Baselios College, Meenangadi, Wayanad (est. 2015)
- Model College, Meenangadi, Wayanad (est. 2010)

=== Training colleges ===
- Mar Baselious College of Teacher Education, Sultan Bathery, Wayanad (est. 2004)
- K. Raghavan Memorial College of Teacher Education, Pulpally, Wayanad (est. 2004)
- St. Gregorios Teacher Training College, Meenangadi, Wayanad (est. 2005)

=== Arabic / Oriental title colleges ===
- Markaz Wayanad Women's College, Sultan Bathery, Wayanad (est. 2013)
- Darunnajath Arabic College, Karuvarakundu, Malappuram

== Lakshadweep ==
- Government Jawaharlal Nehru College, Lakshadweep
- Mahatma Gandhi College, Lakshadweep
- P. M. Sayeed Calicut University Centre, Andrott
