= Thoomanam Waterfalls =

Waterfalls in Kerala, India

- Location: Vadakkencherry, Palakkad district, Kerala, India

Thoomanam Falls is a waterfall located in Thrissur district, Kerala, India. It is located in Vadakkencherry municipality near the Chepelakod forest boundary.
