= Vadakarapathy =

- village
- Country: India
- State: Kerala
- District: Palakkad

Government
  - Body: Vadakarapathy Grama Panchayat

Area
  - Total: 26.26 km^{2} (10.14 sq mi)

Population (2011)
  - Total: 17,717
  - Density: 674.7/km^{2} (1,747/sq mi)

Languages
  - Official: Malayalam, English
- Time zone: UTC+5:30 (IST)
- PIN: 678556
- Vehicle registration: KL-

Vadakarapathy is a village in Chittur taluk of Palakkad district in the state of Kerala, India. Vadakarapathy Grama Panchayat comprises Vadakarapathy and Ozhalapathy revenue villages.

== Demographics ==
As of 2011 India census, Vadakarapathy had a population of 17,717 with 8,866 males and 8,851 females.
