= Sumesh Achuthan =

Indian politician

Adv. Sumesh Achuthan
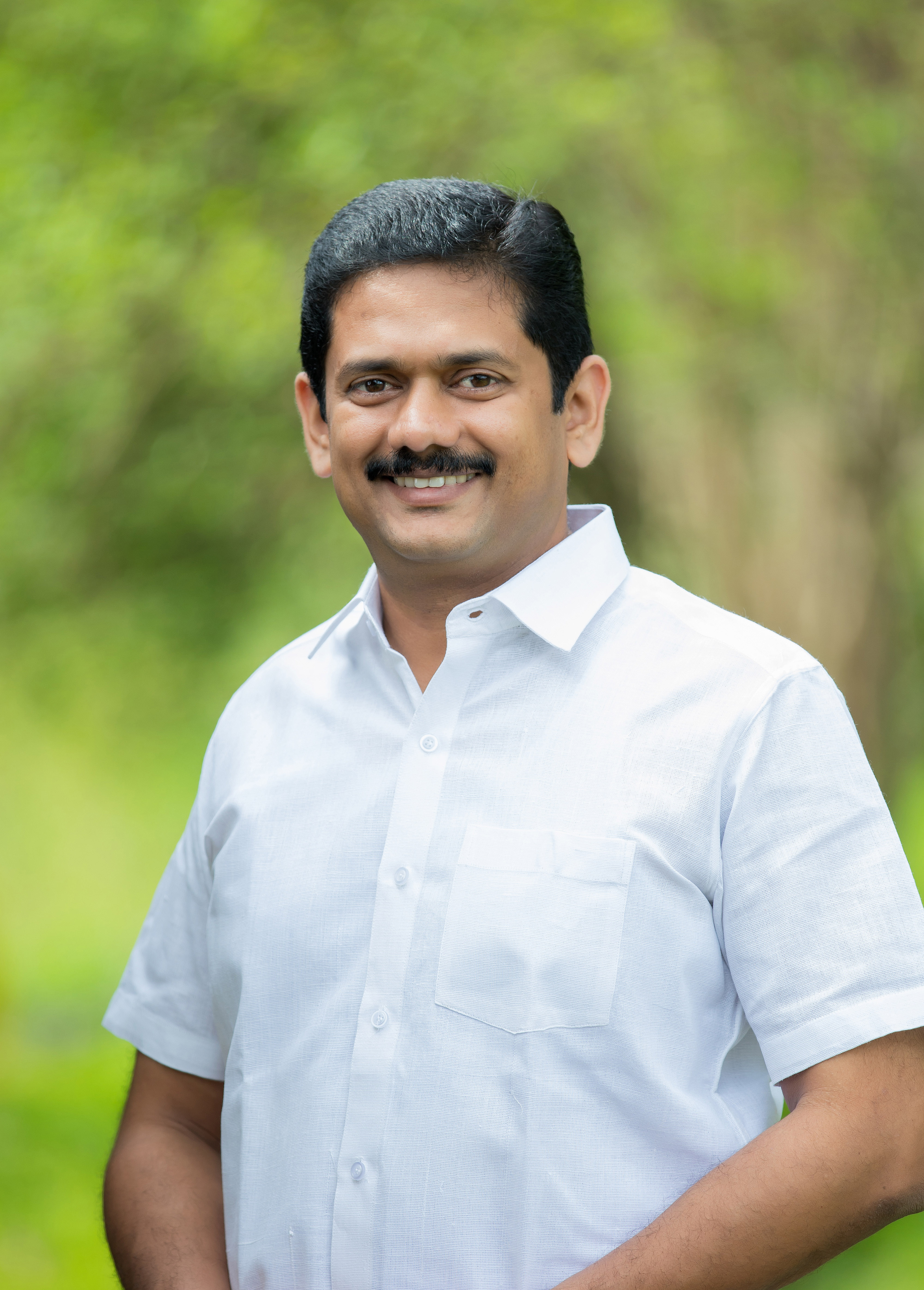

Member of Kerala Legislative Assembly Chittur
- Incumbent
- Assumed office 4 May 2026
- Preceded by: K. Krishnankutty

Personal details
- Born: Chittur, Palakkad, Kerala, India
- Party: Indian National Congress
- Occupation: Advocate, Politician

Sumesh Achuthan is an Indian politician and advocate who has been serving as a Member of the Legislative Assembly (MLA) from the Chittur constituency in Kerala since 4 May 2026. He is a member of the Indian National Congress (INC) and serves as the Chairman of the KPCC OBC Department.

== Early life and education ==
Sumesh Achuthan was born in Chittur, Palakkad, Kerala to K. Achuthan, the former MLA from Chittur constituency.

== Political career ==
=== Key positions ===
He currently holds several positions within the Indian National Congress:

| Position | Organization | Tenure |
|---|---|---|
| Chairman | KPCC OBC Department | 2018–present |
| Vice President | Palakkad District Congress Committee (DCC) | 2014–present |
| President | Palakkad Football Players Association | 2013–present |

=== Legislative Assembly ===
In the 2026 Kerala Legislative Assembly election, Sumesh Achuthan contested from the Chittur constituency (Assembly Constituency 58) as the INC and United Democratic Front (UDF) candidate. He was elected and began his term on 4 May 2026.

==== 2026 election results ====
In the 2026 election, Sumesh Achuthan won the Chittur seat with 65,325 votes (44.2%), defeating ISJD candidate Adv. V. Murugadas by a margin of 6,510 votes (4.4%)

| Candidate | Party | EVM Votes | Postal Votes | Total Votes | Vote % |
|---|---|---|---|---|---|
| Adv. Sumesh Achuthan | Indian National Congress | 64,279 | 1,046 | 65,325 | 44.2% |
| Adv. V. Murugadas | Indian Socialist Janata Dal | 57,949 | 866 | 58,815 | 39.8% |
| Pranesh Rajendran | Bharatiya Janata Party | 14,513 | 184 | 14,697 | 9.94% |

In the 2021 Kerala Assembly election, Sumesh Achuthan contested from Chittur but lost to JD(S)'s K. Krishnankutty, who won with 84,672 votes (55.38%).

== Municipal role ==
In the 2025 local body elections, Sumesh Achuthan contested from the Paruthikkavu ward of Chittur-Thathamangalam Municipality and won, becoming the municipal chairperson in December 2025.

Upon taking office, he announced the removal of the honorific title "honourable" from municipal officials' names, stating "public servants should not enjoy privileges unavailable to common people".

== See also ==
- Chittur Assembly constituency
- Kerala Legislative Assembly
- Indian National Congress
