= Chittur, Palakkad =

Chittur
- Village
- Location in Kerala, India Chittur (India)
- Coordinates: 10.699°N 76.765°E
- Country: India
- State: Kerala
- District: Palakkad

Population (2011)
  - Total: 5,244

Languages
  - Official: Malayalam, English
- Time zone: UTC+5:30 (IST)
- PIN: 6XXXXX
- Vehicle registration: KL-

Chittur is a village in Palakkad district in the state of Kerala, India. A part of it is governed by the Nalleppilly gram panchayat, along with the villages of Nalleppilly and Thekkedesom.

== Demographics ==
As of 2011 India census, Chittur had a population of 5,244 with 2,540 males and 2,704 females.
