= Kozhipathy =

- village
- Country: India
- State: Kerala
- District: Palakkad

Population (2011)
  - Total: 12,265

Languages
  - Official: Malayalam, English
- Time zone: UTC+5:30 (IST)
- PIN: 6XXXXX
- Vehicle registration: KL-

Kozhipathy is a village in the Palakkad district, state of Kerala, India. It forms a part of the Eruthampathy gram panchayat.

== Demographics ==
As of 2011 India census, Kozhipathy had a population of 12265 with 6071 males and 6194 females.
