= LEAD College (Autonomous) =

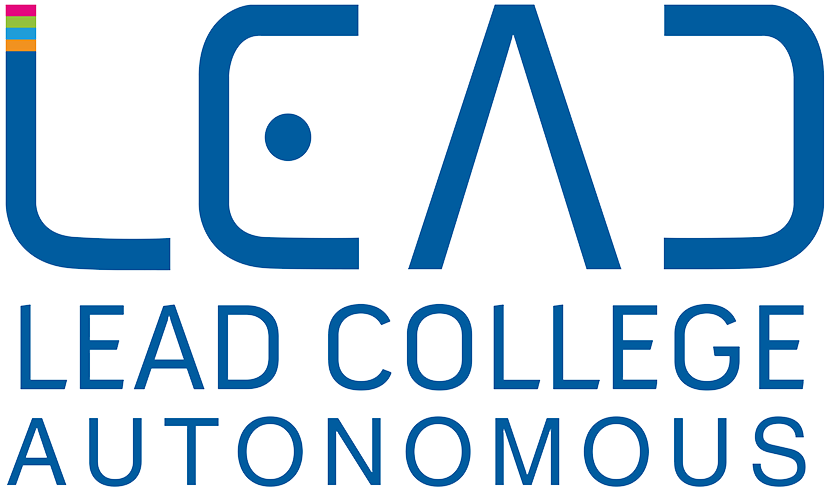
- LEAD College (Autonomous)
- Motto: Computer Science, leadership & entrepreneurship
- Type: Private
- Established: 2011
- Affiliations: University of Calicut
- Director: Dr. Thomas George
- Location: Dhoni, Palakkad, Kerala, India
- Campus: Rural
- Website: www.lead.ac.in

LEAD College (Autonomous) (formerly known as LEAD College of Management) is a college established in 2011 providing Master of Business Administration degrees. The campus is located in Dhoni, Palakkad, Palakkad, Kerala LEAD was established by Dr. Thomas George under Prompt Charitable Trust.
