= Nalleppilly Gram Panchayat =

Gram Panchayat in Kerala, India

Nalleppilly is a gram panchayat in the Palakkad district in the state of Kerala, India. It is the local government organisation that serves the villages of Nalleppilly, Thekkedesom and a part of Chittur. It forms a part of the Chittur taluk.
