= Eruthempathy =

Eruthenpathy
- village
- Country: India
- State: Kerala
- District: Palakkad

Population (2011)
  - Total: 9,469

Languages
  - Official: Malayalam, English, Tamil
- Time zone: UTC+5:30 (IST)
- PIN: 678555
- Vehicle registration: KL-9
- Nearest city: Kozhinjampara
- Lok Sabha constituency: Alathur
- Vidhan Sabha constituency: Chittur
- Climate: Dry (Köppen)

Eruthempathy is a village in the Palakkad district, state of Kerala, India. It forms a part of the Eruthampathy gram panchayat.

== Demographics ==
As of 2011 India census, Eruthenpathy had a population of 9,469 with 4,689 males and 4,780 females.

There are two rivers close by - the Korayar and Varattayar - but today they are dry due to deforestation and misuse of land. The Kerala Water Authority decided to help Eruthenpathy and neighboring villages with their water issues.
