= Vadakkencherry, Palakkad =

Vadakkencherry
- Town
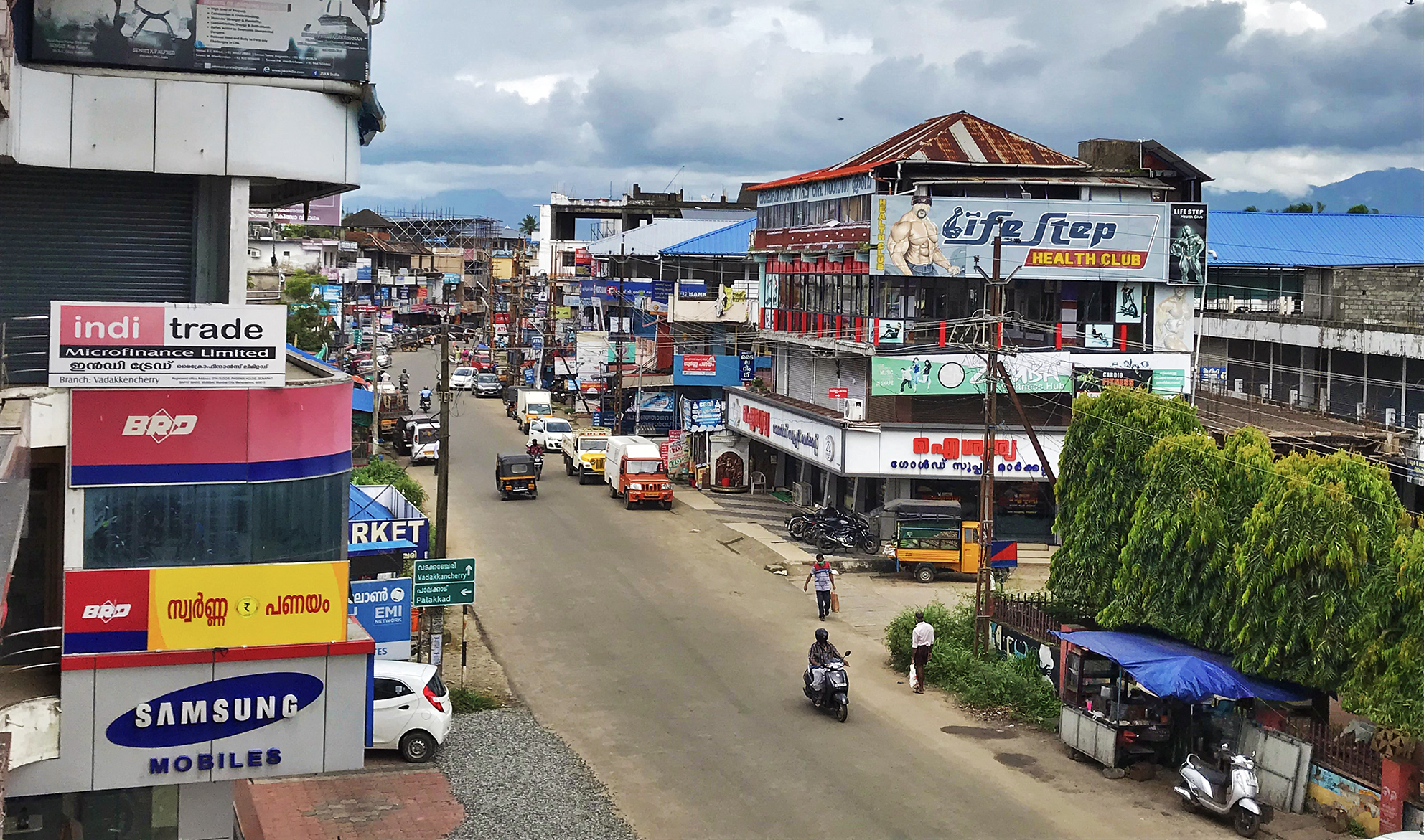
- Vadakkencherry Town

- Location in Kerala Location in India
- Coordinates: 10°35′25.9″N 76°29′00.2″E
- Country: India
- State: Kerala
- District: Palakkad

Government
  - Type: Panchayati raj (India)
  - Body: Vadakkencherry Grama Panchayath

Area
  - Total: 37.88 km^{2} (14.63 sq mi)

Population (2011)
  - Total: 35,969
  - Density: 949.6/km^{2} (2,459/sq mi)

Languages
  - Official: Malayalam, English
- Time zone: UTC+5:30 (IST)
- PIN: 678683
- Telephone code: 91 4922
- Vehicle registration: KL-9, KL-49
- Nearest city: Palakkad (32 km (20 mi) Thrissur (34 km (21 mi)
- Parliament constituency: Alathur
- State Legislative Assembly constituency: Tarur

Vadakkencherry (IPA: [ʋɐɖɐkːɐɲdʒeːɾi]) is a town and gram panchayat in the Palakkad district, state of Kerala,India. It is located about 32 km from Palakkad along National Highway 544. Vadakkencherry-Mannuthy section of NH-544 is the first six lane National Highway in the state.

== Education ==
- College of Applied Science, Vadakkencherry
- St. Mary’s Polytechnic College, Vadakkenchery
- Cherupushpam GHSS Vadakkencherry
- Government Community College, Vadakkenchery
- The Shobha Academy
- Motherteresa School Vadakkencherry
- St Francis School, Elavampadam, Vadakkencherry

== Transportation ==
Vadakkencherry has good connectivity across all major cities. It is located along National Highway 544. Public transportation is mainly through private and KSRTC bus services. A KSRTC operating centre is being operated from Vadakkencherry. There is also a private bus stand usually called as Indira Priyadarshini Bus Stand to operate private bus service. Nearest major railway stations are Palakkad Junction railway station and Thrissur railway station. Nearest airport is Cochin International Airport.
