= Valiyavallampathy =

- village
- Country: India
- State: Kerala
- District: Palakkad

Population (2011)
  - Total: 12,864

Languages
  - Official: Malayalam, English
- Time zone: UTC+5:30 (IST)
- PIN: 6XXXXX
- Vehicle registration: KL-

Valiyavallampathy is a village in the Palakkad district, state of Kerala, India. It forms a part of the area administered by the Kozhinjampara gram panchayat.

== Demographics ==
As of 2011 India census, Valiyavallampathy had a population of 12,864 with 6,342 males and 6,522 females.
