= P. Sankar =

Indian politician

P. Sankar (22 June 1915 – 12 October 1993) was an Indian politician and leader of Communist Party of India. He represented Chittur constituency in 5th Kerala Legislative Assembly.

== Positions held ==
- Member, CPI State Council
- Central Committee, Communist Party of Ceylon (1943–52)
- All India Agricultural Workers Union; Vice President
- Assistant Secretary of the Ceylon Trade Union Federation
- President, Malayalee Mahajana Sabha
- Joined INC in 1935 and later worked in Ceylon
- Joined the Lanka Sama Samaja Party in 1937 and later the United Socialist Party and the Communist Party of Sri Lanka
- Returned to Kerala in 1952; Member of the CPI State Council
- Secretary of the AITUC
- Editor of Navshakti and Chenkathir
