= Pattencherry Gram Panchayat =

Pattencherry is a gram panchayat in the Palakkad district, state of Kerala, India. It is a local government organisation that serves the village of Pattanchery and part of Thathamangalam.
