= P. Balachandra Menon =

Indian politician

P Balachandra Menon (17 March 1911 – 14 December 1984) was a politician from Indian State of Kerala who belonged to the Communist Party of India. He was member of Kerala legislative assembly in 1957 and 1960 for Chittur constituency.

He represented Kerala in Rajya Sabha, The Council of States of India parliament during 1967 to 1973.
