= CM College of Arts and Science =

- Type: Private
- Established: 2010; 16 years ago
- Parent institution: CM Centre
- Affiliations: University of Calicut
- Chairman: TK Abdurahman Baqavi
- Principal: Shaheer Ali M
- Location: Nadavayal, Panamaram, Kerala, 670721, India; 11.7524°N 76.121°E
- Campus: Rural
- Website: cmcollege.in
- Location within Kerala

CM College (officially: CM College of Arts and Science) is an unaided college in Nadavayal, Wayanad district under the CM Centre Madavoor affiliated to University of Calicut. It was established in 2010.

== Departments ==
- Commerce
- Computer Science
- English
- Management
- Mathematics
- Mass Communication
- Economics
- Physical Education

== Notable alumni ==
- Anagha Narikkuni, Politician
- Anoop Paul, Professor, Mary Matha Arts & Science College

== See also ==
- Education in India
- Education in Kerala
- List of institutions of higher education in Kerala
- List of colleges affiliated to the University of Calicut
