= Polpully =

- village
- Interactive map of Polpully
- Coordinates: 10°44′4″N 76°43′46″E
- Country: India
- State: Kerala
- District: Palakkad

Population (2011)
  - Total: 16,500

Languages
  - Official: Malayalam, English
- Time zone: UTC+5:30 (IST)
- PIN: 678552
- Vehicle registration: KL-09, KL-70

Polpully is a village and gram panchayat in Palakkad district in the state of Kerala, India. The village is located 10 km (6.2 mi) from Palakkad city, and 5 km (3.1 mi) from Chittur.

== Demographics ==
As of 2011 India census, Polpully is a village situated in Palakkad of Palakkad district, Kerala with 3894 families. The Polpully village has population of 16500 with 8029 males and 8471 females.

In the village population of children aged 0–6 is 1460 which is 8.85% of its total population .Polpully's average sex ratio of is 1055, which is lower than 1084, Kerala state average. Polpully's child sex ratio according to the census is 891, lower than Kerala average of 964.

While compared to Kerala, Polpully village has lower literacy rate. Polpully village's literacy rate was 84.73% compared to Kerala's 94.00%. Male literacy in Polpully was 91.04% and female literacy rate was 78.84%.

== Educational Institutions ==
In Polpully grama panchayat one can have their basic education. KVM Upper primary Aided School is one of the old schools in the panchayat. It was founded in the year 1947. PGP Higher Secondary School is the only higher secondary school in the panachayat.

== Attractions ==
One of the main attraction of Polpully is the Perunkurichiappan temple (Lord Shiva), which attracts many peoples from the neighbouring states. Every year "Desa Niramala" is very well celebrated in this temple. The premises of temple is covered by paddy fields, a temple pond and also there is a small river "Thodu" flowing near to the temple in which a small dam like structure is present for irrigation purposes. Eventually the river joins with the Chittur puzha and later to the Bharathapuzha.

Perunkurichiappan temple

There are also some more main places for worship in Polpully grama panchayath: Sree Polpully Bhagavathy temple and Sree Perunkurussi Bhagavathy temple are within half kilometer distance of main Siva temple, Sree Elaya Bhagavathy temple, Thirunagappilly Siva temple, Sri Chemittiya Bhagavathy temple, Madharasathul Kuraniya Juma Masjid, Sri Venugopalaswamy temple and Ayyappan temple situated in Coolimuttam Gramam, Coolimuttam Mariyamman temple.

== Festival ==
The most important and prestigious festival of Polpully is the Vishu-Vela which is held every year on April 20. Vishu-vela is a festival mainly seen in Palakkad. It is celebrated either before the festival of Vishu or after that. Polpully folk lore has it that two youth from the village went to attend the Vishu-Vela in a neighbouring village which ended up in a fight and they took it upon themselves to celebrate it in Polpully every year since then. The tradition in Polpully could be as old as 100 years.

The festivities mainly consists of the following programs starting mid-afternoon and up to midnight. An Elephant being paraded in a procession with the village deity Polpully Bhagavathy atop it. It starts from the Polpully Bhagavathy Kshetram to the Mannam (village central area).Then about a kilometer distance is covered with various stoppages along the route. The procession would be accompanied by the villagers and a band of musicians playing the Panchavadyam and it usually takes about 4 hours in the evening, followed by Vedikettu (Fire works) and Double Thayambaka. The number of elephants varies from year to year.

Coolimuttam Mariyamman pooja is another main festival of the panchayat. It is celebrated over a week. Many people from neighbouring villages/states join the celebration. The Coolimuttam houses are almost filled with the relatives. The Navarathri day festivals and Pongal are also celebrated.

Polpully Thodu

Polpully School
