= Eruthampathy =

Gram panchayat in Palakkad district, Kerala, India

Eruthenpathy is a gram panchayat in the Palakkad district, state of Kerala, India. It is a local government organisation that serves the villages of Eruthampathy and Kozhipathy.
