= Dhoni, Palakkad =

Village in Kerala, India

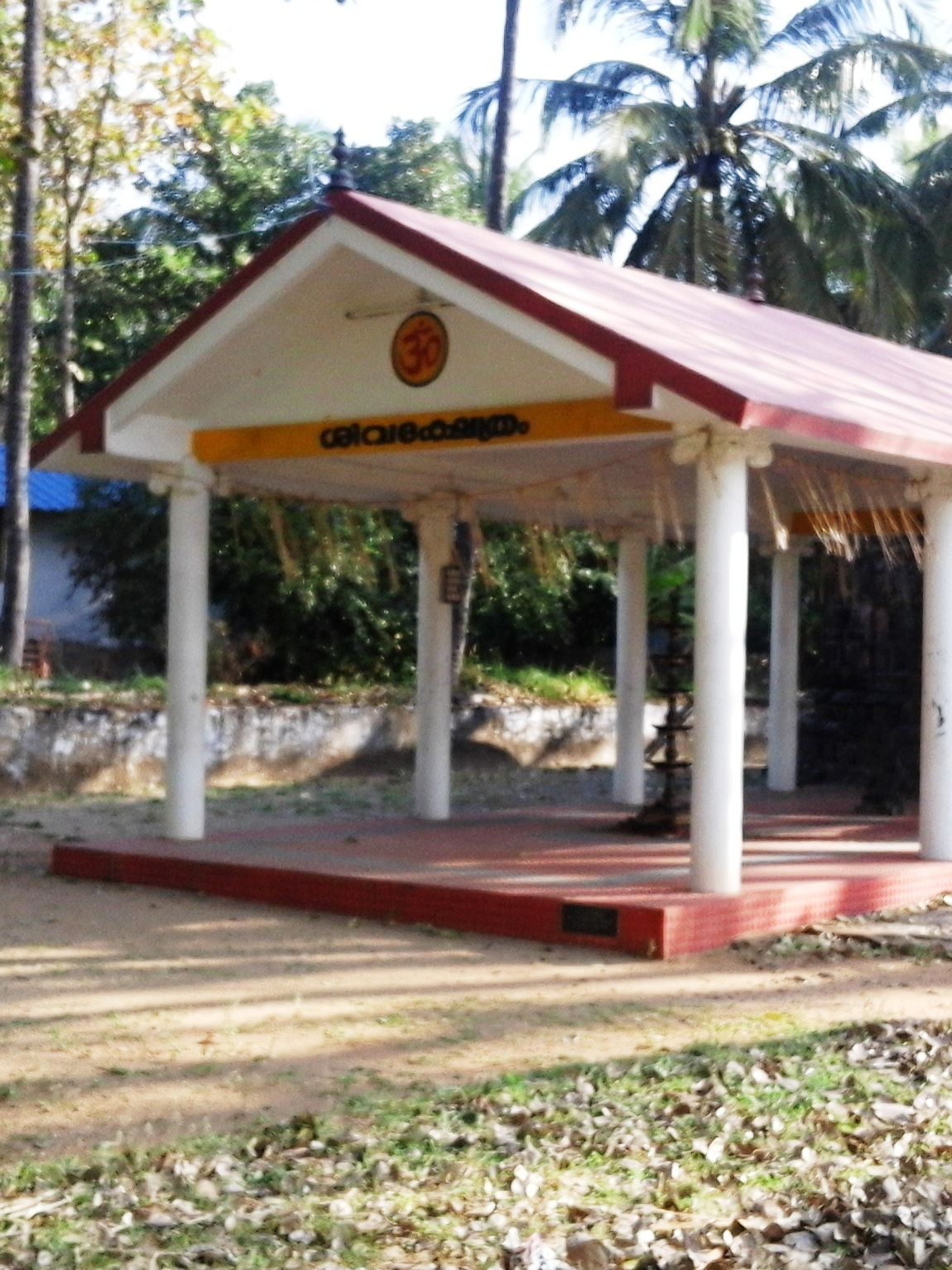
Shiva Temple at Dhoni village

Dhoni is situated around 15 Kilometers from Palakkad town in Kerala, India. It is the location of Dhoni Waterfalls and the Western Ghat

== Overview ==
Dhoni is bordered by Western Ghats on the north. Dhoni Waterfalls is located around 15 km from Palakkad and around 34 km from Kollengode Town in Palakkad.

== Suburbs and villages ==
- Ullas Nagar and Vishnu Nagar
- Soorya Nagar and Shanthi Nagar
- Akathethara and EMS Nagar
- Thanav Railway Station and Athaniparamba

== Gallery ==
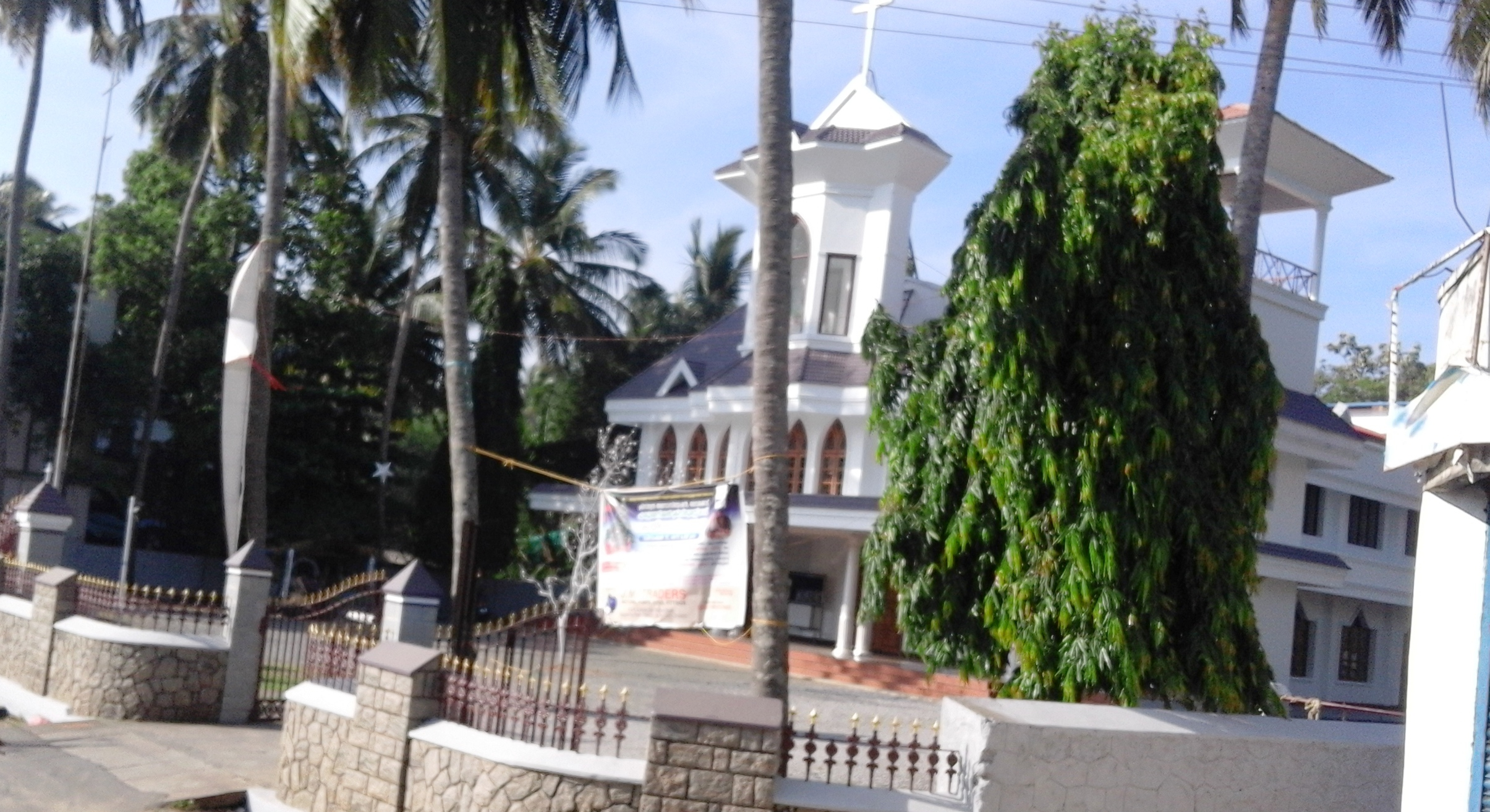
Church on Dhoni Road

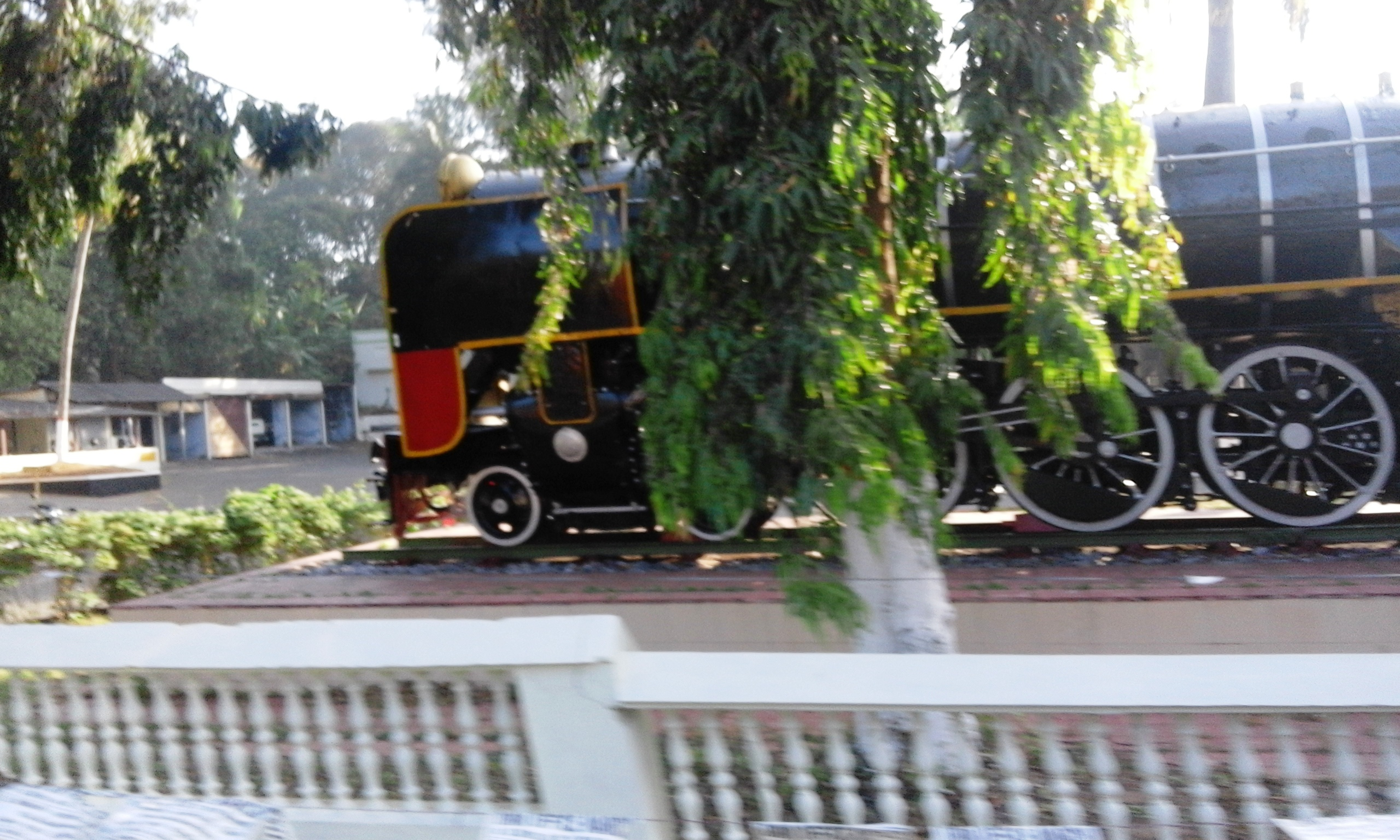
Railway Headquarters

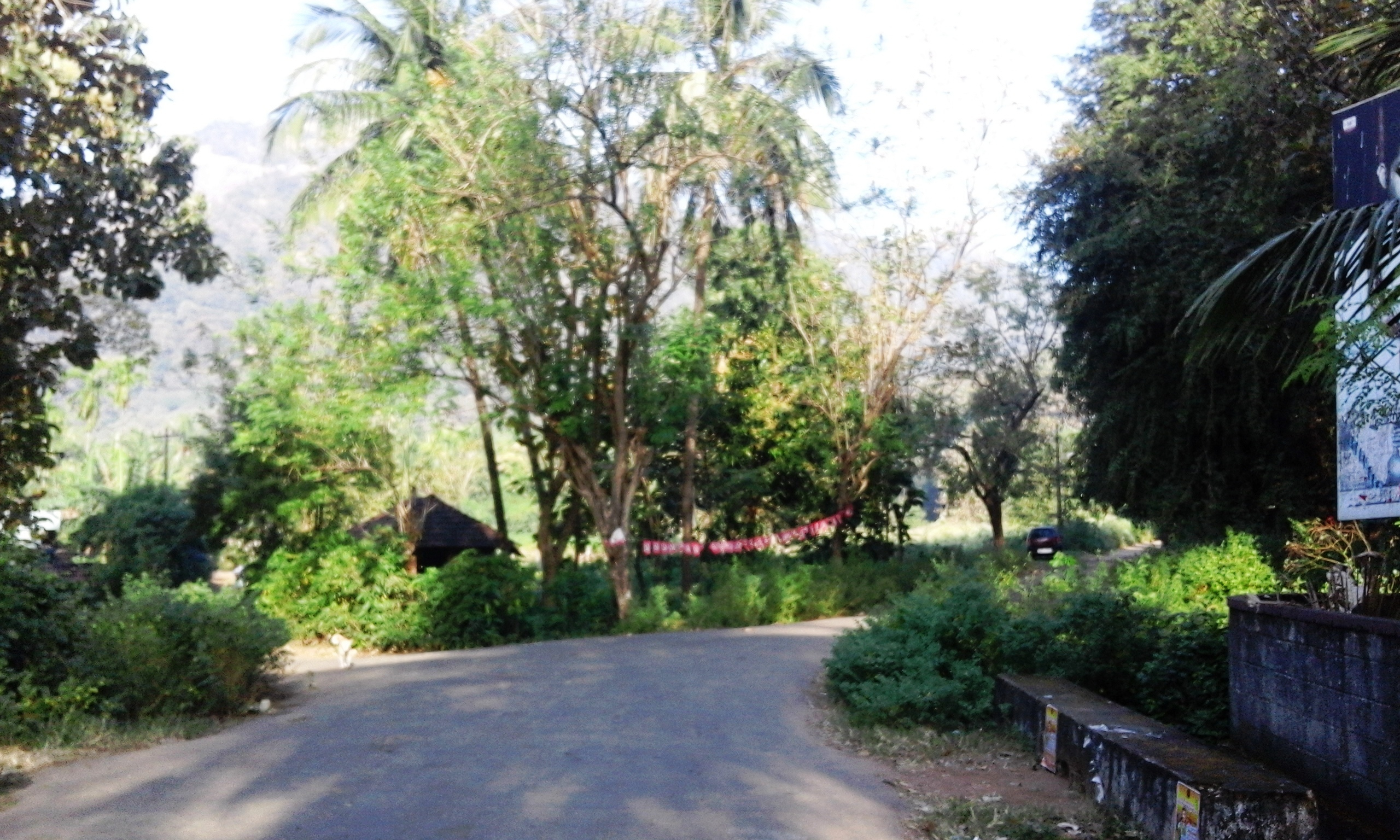
Dhoni Village Last Stop
