= Kulappully =

- Suburb
- Location in Kerala, India
- Coordinates: 10°47′0″N 76°16′0″E
- Country: India
- State: Kerala
- District: Palakkad

Government
  - Body: Shoranur Municipality

Languages
  - Official: Malayalam
- Time zone: UTC+5:30 (IST)
- PIN: 679122
- Telephone code: 0466
- Vehicle registration: KL-51
- Lok Sabha constituency: Palakkad
- Vidhan Sabha constituency: Shoranur
- Website: www.shornurmunicipality.in

Kulappully (also written as Kulappulli) is a junction and part of Shoranur municipality in Palakkad district of Kerala, India. It is located at the junction of the Palakkad-Pattambi road and the Shoranur-Thrissur road.

== Politics ==
Kulappully falls under the Shornur assembly constituency, and the Palakkad parliament constituency.

== See also ==
- Kulappulli Leela
- Valluvanad
- Shoranur
