= Pattanchery =

Pattancherry
- Village
- Location in Kerala, India Pattancherry (India)
- Coordinates: 10.6394500°N 76.7690800°E
- Country: India
- State: Kerala
- District: Palakkad

Government
  - Type: Panchayati raj (India)
  - Body: Gram panchayat

Population (2001)
  - Total: 17,915

Languages
  - Official: Malayalam, English
- Time zone: UTC+5:30 (IST)
- PIN: 678532
- Telephone code: 04923
- Vehicle registration: KL-09
- Nearest city: Kollengode
- Lok Sabha constituency: Alathur
- Vidhan Sabha constituency: Chittur

Pattancherry is a village in the Palakkad district, state of Kerala, India. It forms a part of the Pattencherry gram panchayat.

== History and related trivia ==
Pattanchery was formerly known as Bhattasreni.

The village has a Shiva temple, Ganesha temple, Vishnu temple, Ayyappan temple and a Devi temple.

== Connectivity ==
The nearest railway station is the Palakkad Junction railway station, about 25 kms away. Public bus service and auto services are available. Pattancherry is about 22 km from Palakkad. Chittur is the nearest town which is approximately 6 km away. There is a South Indian Bank and an ATM in the village.

== Demographics ==
As of 2001 India census, Pattancherry had a population of 17,915 with 8,726 males and 9,189 females. Agriculture, Toddy tapping, fish farms are the main income source of the people of the Panchayat.

== Schools ==
- GHSS Pattencherry
- KKMHSS Vandithavalam
- Govt High school Nanniyode
- Karuna School Chempottanpalam
