= Vadakarapathy Gram Panchayat =

Vadakarapathy is a gram panchayat in the Palakkad district, state of Kerala, India. It is a local government organisation serving the villages of Vadakarapathy and Ozhalapathy.
