= Ozhalapathy =

- village
- Location in Kerala, India Ozhalapathy (India)
- Coordinates: 10.7979°N 76.8923°E
- Country: India
- State: Kerala
- District: Palakkad

Area
  - Total: 22.93 km^{2} (8.85 sq mi)

Population (2011)
  - Total: 8,742
  - Density: 381.2/km^{2} (987.4/sq mi)

Languages
  - Official: Malayalam, English
- Time zone: UTC+5:30 (IST)
- PIN: 678557
- Vehicle registration: KL-70

Ozhalapathy is a village in the Palakkad district, state of Kerala, India. It is administered by the Vadakarapathy gram panchayat.

== Demographics ==
As of 2011 India census, Ozhalapathy had a population of 8,742 with 4,306 males and 4,436 females.
