= Chembai Memorial Government Music College =

- Established: 1957; 69 years ago
- Location: College Rd, Parakkunnam Palakkad, Kerala, 678001, India; 10.7796231°N 76.6539678°E
- Campus: Urban
- Language: English
- Website: http://www.cmgmcpalakkad.ac.in/
- Location within Kerala Location within India

Chembai Memorial Government Music College, Palakkad, Kerala was established in 1957 as Government Music Academy offering Bachelor degree courses in Music, Veena, Violin and Mridangam and Master Degree course in Music.

== About College ==
In 1980, it was given its present name in memory of the Carnatic musician from Palakkad, Chembai Vaidyanatha Bhagavathar. It offers various Bachelor of Arts degrees in vocal and Carnatic musical instruments and Master of Arts degree in Carnatic vocal.

There is also a proposal for making Chembai Memorial Government Music College in Palakkad as a Centre of Excellence by starting new courses in performing arts.

== See also ==
- Education in India
- Education in Kerala
- List of institutions of higher education in Kerala
- List of colleges affiliated to the University of Calicut
