= Indian Socialist Janata Dal =

Political party in India

- Abbreviation: ISJD
- President: Mathew T. Thomas
- Founder: Mathew T. Thomas
- Founded: 17 January 2026 (9 months ago)
- Split from: Janata Dal (Secular)
- Ideology: Democratic socialism
- Political position: Centre-left
- Colours: Green
- Alliance: Left Democratic Front (LDF)
- Seats in Kerala Legislative Assembly: 0 / 140
- Number of states and union territories in government: 0 / 31

Election symbol
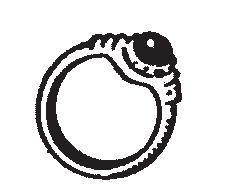

Party flag
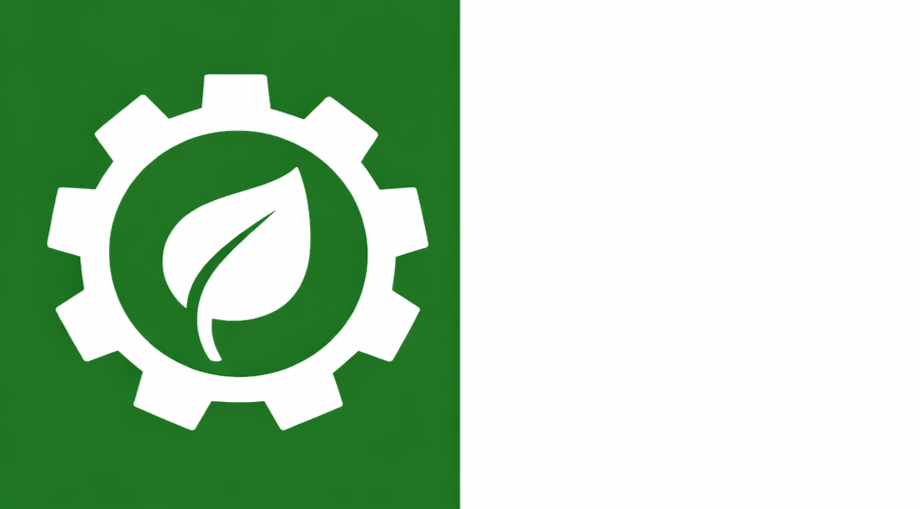

The Indian Socialist Janata Dal (ISJD) is an Indian democratic socialist political party. It was founded by Mathew T. Thomas as a breakaway faction from the Janata Dal (Secular).

== History ==
The Indian Socialist Janata Dal was established to resolve the conflict of the Kerala state unit of the Janata Dal (Secular) after its national leadership, led by H. D. Deve Gowda and H. D. Kumaraswamy, formed an alliance with the National Democratic Alliance led by the Bharatiya Janata Party, while being allied locally with the Left Democratic Front. The Kerala unit of the Janata Dal (Secular) is a part of the Communist Party of India (Marxist)-led Left Democratic Front and has opposed the national leadership's alliance with the Bharatiya Janata Party on ideological grounds such as secularism and socialism.

In December 2025, The Indian Socialist Janata Dal was registered with 100 founding members in Palakkad. The ISJD has laid claim for the wheel symbol as its electoral symbol. The symbol has been frozen for years by the Election Commission of India after successive Janata parties laid claim to it.

The official merger of the Kerala unit of the Janata Dal Secular to the Indian Socialist Janata Dal was declared on January 17, 2026, in Kochi.

== Ideology ==
The ISJD follows democratic socialism and secularism and emphasizes on decentralized power, social justice, and uplifting the marginalized communities. They are inspired by the ideals of Ram Manohar Lohia and Dr. B. R. Ambedkar and aims to maintain its LDF alliance and identity against BJP alignment.

== Electoral History ==
=== Kerala Legislative Assembly ===
Election Year	Alliance	Seats Contested	Seats Won	Total votes	Percentage of Votes	± Vote
2026	LDF	1	0	58,815	0.27	New entry

== Prominent leaders ==
- Mathew T. Thomas – (Founder), Former Minister for Water Resources (2016-2018) , Minister for Transport (2009-2012) in Government of Kerala; Former MLA of Thiruvalla
- K. Krishnankutty – Former Minister for Electricity (2021-2026), Minister for Water Resources (2018-2021) in Government of Kerala; Former MLA of Chittur.

== See also ==
- Janata Dal
- Janata Dal (Secular)
