= Thekkedesom =

- village
- Country: India
- State: Kerala
- District: Palakkad

Population (2011)
  - Total: 13,108

Languages
  - Official: Malayalam, English
  - Regional: Malayalam, Tamil
- Time zone: UTC+5:30 (IST)
- PIN: 678553
- Vehicle registration: KL-70 Chittur
- Website: www.thekkedesom village.com

Thekkedesom is a village in the Palakkad district, state of Kerala, India. It forms a part of the Nalleppilly gram panchayat, which is itself subordinate to the Chittur taluk.

== Demographics ==
As of 2011 India census, Thekkedesom had a population of 13,108 with 6,430 males and 6,678 females. It is a beautiful heaven of mental people
