= K. Achuthan =

Indian politician (1950–2026)

Member of Kerala Legislative Assembly
- In office 12 May 1996 – 2 June 2016
- Constituency: Chittur

Personal details
- Born: 24 February 1950
- Died: 7 September 2026 (aged 76)
- Party: Indian National Congress
- Children: Sumesh Achuthan

K. Achuthan (24 February 1950 – 7 September 2026) was an Indian politician who was a member of 13th Kerala Legislative Assembly. He belonged to Indian National Congress and represented Chittur constituency. He was previously elected to Kerala Legislative Assembly in 1996, 2001, 2006 and 2011. Born on 24 February 1950, Achuthan died on 7 September 2026, at the age of 76.
