= Nalleppilly =

- village
- Location in Kerala, India Nalleppilly (India)
- Coordinates: 10.733°N 76.8°E
- Country: India
- State: Kerala
- District: Palakkad

Government
  - Type: Panchayati raj (India)
  - Body: Gram panchayat

Area
  - Total: 28 km^{2} (11 sq mi)

Population (2011)
  - Total: 14,361
  - Density: 510/km^{2} (1,300/sq mi)

Languages
  - Official: Malayalam, English
  - Regional: Malayalam, Tamil
- Time zone: UTC+5:30 (IST)
- PIN: 678553
- Telephone code: 04923
- Vehicle registration: KL-70
- Nearest city: Chittur
- Literacy: 60%
- Lok Sabha constituency: Alathur
- Vidhan Sabha constituency: Chittur
- Climate: dry (Köppen)

Nallepilly is a village in the Palakkad district, state of Kerala, India. It is the main village of the Nalleppilly gram panchayat and forms a part of Chittur taluk.

== History ==
Before British Raj, it was part of Kingdom of Cochin.

== Demographics ==
As of 2011 India census, Nallepilly had a population of 14,361 with 6,966 males and 7395 females.
