= Kozhinjampara =

- Town
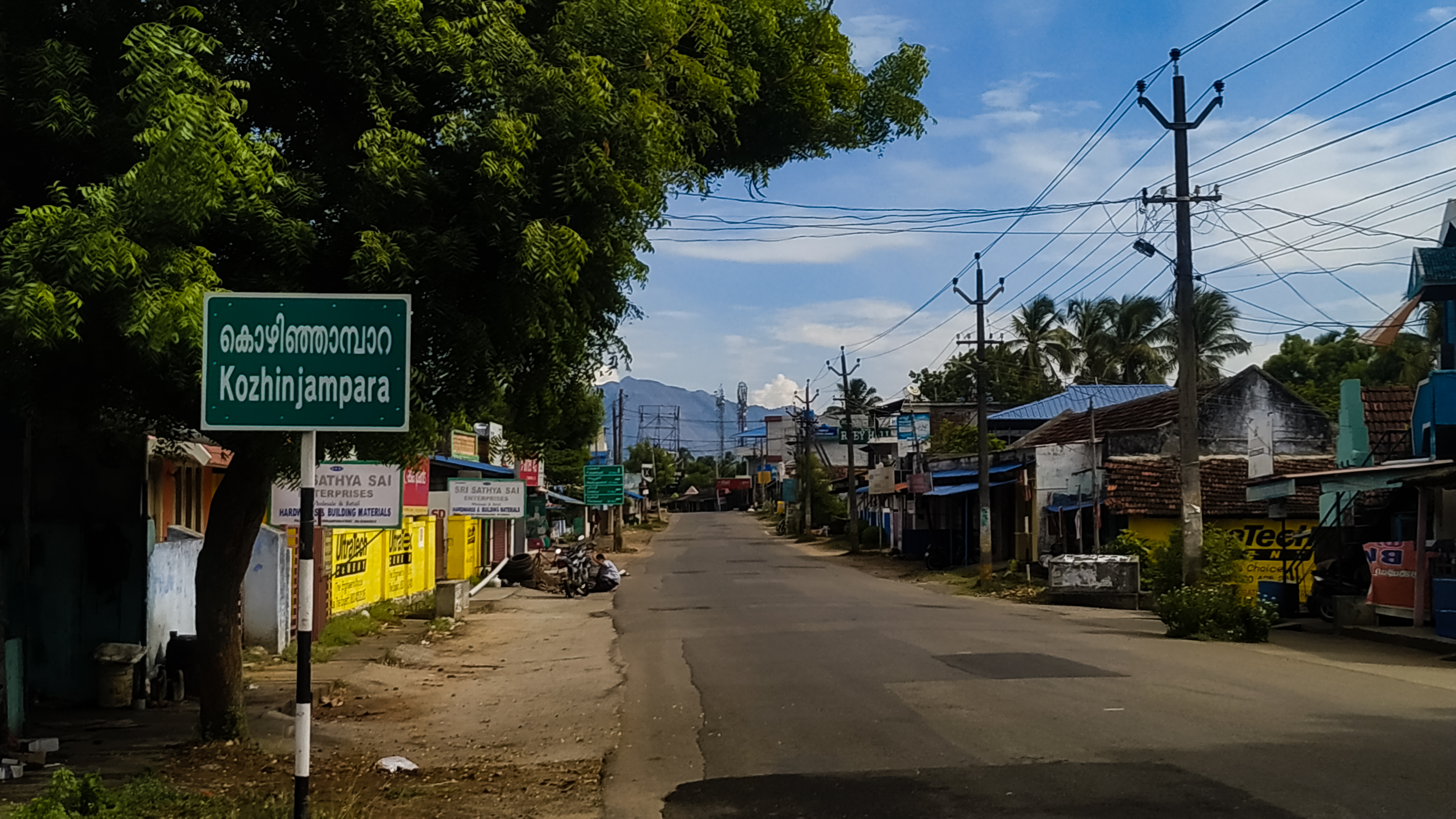

- Location in Kerala, India Kozhinjampara (India)
- Coordinates: 10°44′17.587″N 76°50′5.852″E
- Country: India
- State: Kerala
- District: Palakkad

Government
  - Type: Panchayati raj (India)
  - Body: Kozhinjampara Grama panchayat

Area
  - Total: 11.06 km^{2} (4.27 sq mi)

Population (2011)
  - Total: 12,311
  - Density: 1,113/km^{2} (2,883/sq mi)

Languages
  - Official: Malayalam, English
- Time zone: UTC+5:30 (IST)
- PIN: 678555
- Telephone code: 04923
- Vehicle registration: KL-70

Kozhinjampara is a town in the Palakkad district, state of Kerala, India. It forms a part of the area administered by the Kozhinjampara gram panchayat.

== Demographics ==
As of 2011 Indian census, Kozhinjampara village had a population of 12,311, with 6,042 males and 6,269 females. The total number of households in the village limit is 2,919. Kozhinjampara village has a lower literacy rate compared to Kerala. In 2011, the literacy rate of Kozhinjampara village was 84.17%, compared to 94.00% for Kerala. In Kozhinjampara, male literacy stands at 90.47%, while the female literacy rate was 78.12%.

Rowther biriyani is a traditional food available in Kozhinjampara

== Education ==
- Government Arts and Science College, Kozhinjanpara
- Baratmata arts and science college kozhinjamapara
- VHSC Sathram
- St Paul's higher secondary school, Kozhinjampara
- Bagavathi higher secondary school, Vanamada
- St Paul's High school
- St Martin high school
- Vanamada high school
- St xavier cbse school
- Saraswathi cbse school
- Govt up school Kozhinjampara, Athicode, Nattukal, Pudur
