= Kozhinjampara Gram Panchayat =

Gram Panchayat in Palakkad district of Kerala, India

Kozhinjampara is a gram panchayat in the Palakkad district, state of Kerala, India. It is a local government organisation that serves the villages of Kozhinjampara and Valiyavallampathy.
