= Tourist attractions in Palakkad district =

Palakkad district has a large number of temples, churches, mosques and other tourist attractions. Palakkad district is situated in the middle of Kerala state in South India. The nearest airports are at Coimbatore in Tamil Nadu and Cochin in Kerala.

== Places of interest ==
- Palakkad Fort – Situated in the heart of town, this is the most beautiful and best preserved fort in Kerala, recalling many old tales of valour and courage. The Fort, which dates back to 1766, was built by Hyder Ali of Mysore. In 1784, after a siege which lasted for eleven days, British Col. William Fullarton (1754–1808) stormed the fort. Later it fell into the hands of the Zamorin’s troops, but was recaptured by the British in 1790. This well-preserved fort is also known as Tipu's Fort, after Tipu Sultan the son of Hyder Ali. It is under the protection of the Archaeological Survey of India.
- Malampuzha dam garden – A large irrigation dam on the Bharatapuzha river, on the valley of Western Ghats. There is a beautiful gardens, an amusement park for children and a boating facility on the reservoir.
- Parambikulam Wildlife Sanctuary, sprawling over 285 km^{2}., is 135 km from Palakkad and adjacent to the Indira Gandhi National Park and Wildlife Sanctuary in Tamil Nadu. Besides being an abode of elephants, wild boar, sambar, bison, guar, crocodiles, and a few tigers and panthers, it has a rich assortment of semi-tropical plants and trees. Trekking in the forest is allowed with prior permission. Boating can be done at the lake. The Cannimare Teak Tree, which is said to be Asia’s largest, is here near Thunakadavu.
- Silent Valley National Park – A thick rain forest, with many rare species, it has been declared a National Park. It is 80 km. from Palakkad. It is popularly known as the "Evergreen Forest" and noted for its eerie silence because of the lack of cicadas, which are common elsewhere. It is an important biosphere reserve in the Western Ghats and the home of tribal people. The valley is a habitat for the rare lion-tailed macaque. The park is also a protected area for tigers.
- Killikkurussimangalam – The birthplace of Kunchan Nambiar, the great Malayalam satirical poet and creator of the Ottamthullal art form. There is a library dedicated to him in the village. The very famous and old Killikkurussi Siva temple is situated here. The home of abhinaya (acting) authority, Natyacharya Vidushakaratnam Padma Shri Guru Mani Madhava Chakyar (who took Koodiyattam to new heights), is also a special cultural attraction of the village. The Mani Madhava Chakyar Smaraka Gurukulam, a school devoted to the teaching of Koodiyattam, is located at the same site.

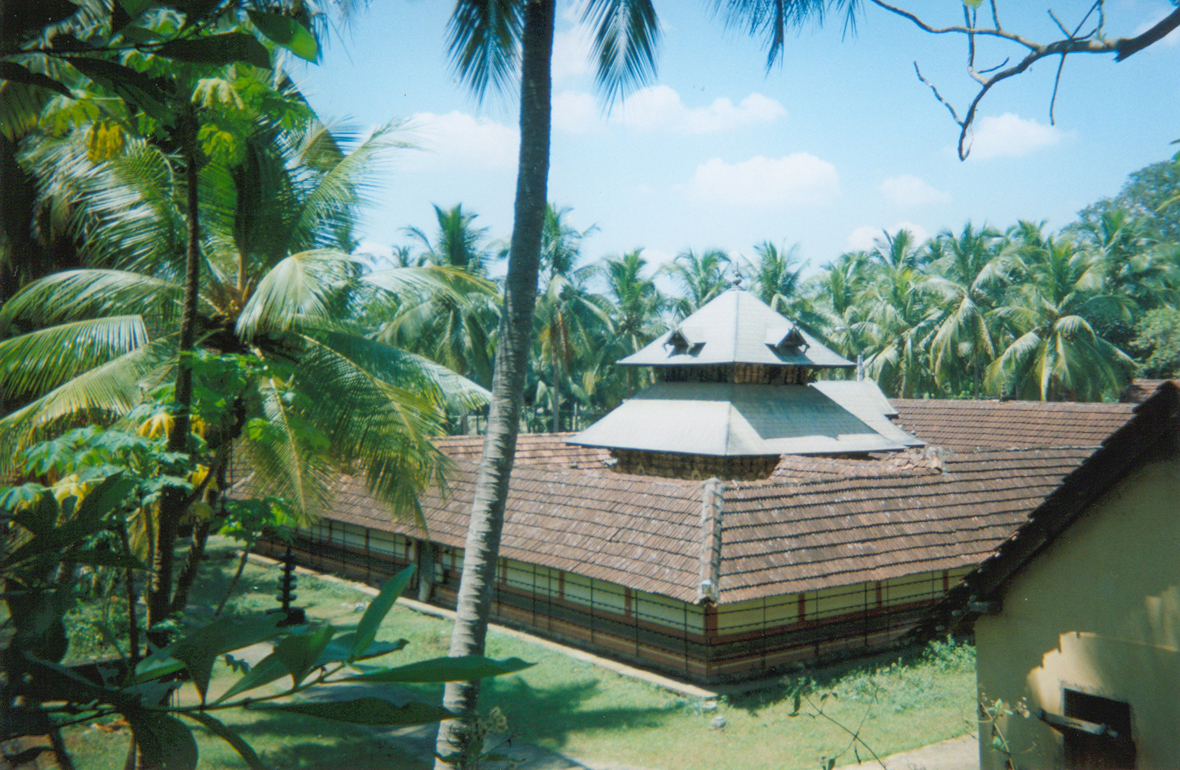
Sri Killikkurussi Mahadeva Kshetram Shiva temple of Kiillikkurussimangalam

- Nelliyampathi – Known as the Ooty of Kerala, about 80 km from Palakkad and 29 km from Nemmara Town. It is a hill station in the forest between a series of ridges cut off from one another by valleys of dark evergreen forests
- Sholayar – Highest peak in the district, with coffee and tea plantations.
- Attappady – About 38 km. northeast of Mannarkkad. It is a place of great interest to anthropologists, as many Irulas and Mudugars live here. These Adivasis worship the mountain peak Malleswaran as a gigantic Shiva Lingam. This peak and the River Bhavani are of great mythological significance to the tribes.
- Pothundi Dam - It is about 8 km from Nemmara town and the second earth dam (Dam built using mud, not using cement) in India. This dam is in the valley of Nelliyampathy hills. There is a beautiful garden and the view of nelliyampathy hills are interesting.
- Walayar Dam – It is around 25 km from Palakkad town, on the border of Kerala and Tamil Nadu. It is an easily accessible location. There is also a deer park located 3 km from Walayar.
- Chulanur – A peacock sanctuary.
- Sholayar Forest – Highest peak in the district, with coffee and tea plantations and Sholayar dam bordering Valparai and Athirapally Waterfalls near Chalakkudy.
- Dhoni – A reserve forest area about 15 km. from Palakkad. This forest has many interesting sights including a small but splendid waterfall. The site can be reached after a fairly long climb of three hours from the base of the Dhoni hills.
- Jainimedu Jain temple of Jainimedu – Situated on the western border of Palakkad town, not far from the Railway station, is a historic Jain temple. The place around the temple is known as Jainimedu. This is one of the few places in Kerala where the vestiges of Jainism in Kerala have survived. The granite walls are devoid of decoration. The 32 × 20 ft. temple consists of four divisions with images of tirthankaras and yakshinis in three of them. Kumaran Asan wrote his monumental poem Veena Poovu "The Fallen Flower" at a house here during a brief stay with his master Narayana Guru.
- Nerchappara. A Forest area about 13 km from Nemmara Town and 1 km from Olippara. It consists of several secured small waterfalls and streams for swimming and favorite place for people for spend their day. this is one of the recharger to Mangalam River. Mangalam Dam and Pothundi Dam are the nearest tourist Places.
- Meenvallam Water Falls. Situated near Kalladikode is a famous water fall. Water fall is divided into number of smaller ones on top of other. It was a famous Hiking destination before the Hydro electric power Station proposed.
- Kanjirapuzha Dam and garden.about 37.4 km from Palakkad town. kanjirapuzha dam built for large area irrigation purpose, very beautiful place comfortable for visiting with family. And also available fresh water fish from Dam .
- Kottayi, a village about 16 km from Palakkad town. It is the birthplace of famous Carnatic music singer Chembai Vaidyanatha Bhagavatar.

== Festivals ==
Navaratri, the festival of nine nights is the most popular festival, celebrated throughout India with varied customs and traditions. Though, this Navaratri Festival is celebrated all over India, different part of it makes a different way of celebration as it symbolizes different things in different regions. They celebrate this festival in a unique way of their own as the people in the Agraharam of Kodunthirapully Palakkad do. Nestling in small beautiful landscape about 3 km west of Palakkad town limit, the Agraharam boasts with the collection of Vaishnavates 'Jaiminiya Samavedi Thalavakara Guru' sakha Tamil Brahmins in about 100 uniform row houses, arranged properly on both sides of the streets facing north and south directions. The Agraharam retain much of their original character and housed only Brahmins. The Agraharam may not attract devotees from far and wide to its precincts daily, yet it has its own unique features which could not be seen anywhere else. Apart from other usual Agraharam festivals the most important festivals of the Village is Navaratri festival, which is conducted for nine days. It is celebrated once every year during the end of September month and in the beginning of the month of October. It starts from bright fortnight day just after the Mahalayapaksha Ammavasa.

- Nenmara Vallanghy Vela
- Kalpathi Ratholsavam
- Sekharipuram Ratholsavam

Shekaripuram (sometimes spelt Sekharipuram or Shekharipuram) is a village in the town of Palakkad in Kerala, India. This village consists of five main streets, each containing its own temple. The main temple is situated on "Ratta Theruvu" (translated as Double Street). This is the Lakshminarayan Temple.

== Festivals ==
The Chariot (Theru) Festival occurs during the month of May.

A major Mahakumbabishekam festival in May 2007 was conducted at the Lakshminarayan Temple.

- Puthusseri Vedi Ulsavam
- Chinakkathoor Pooram
- Manappullikavu Vela
- Padur Vela at Sri Ayyappan Temple (Panicknarappan), Padur in the month of February every year.
- Tattamangalam Kuthira Vela
- Kongad Thirumandhamkunnu Pooram
- Mancherikkavu (Manjerikkavu) Kummatty
- Cheraya Monnumoorthy temple Ardhra Darshanam
- Kannyar Kali at Vadavannur, Coyalmannam, Puthucode, Kattussery
- Thattamangalam Ayyappan Festival at West Village
- Mannarkkad Pooram
- Pattanchery Kummatty, Karivela, followed by Pavakoothu and Koothabhishekam
- Kannyar Kali & Kummatty at Kunissery
- VELA Maholsavam [{in every year in Medam months Avittam Stars}]
- Uthram-Atham Vilakku, Ayyappan Kavu, Kottayi

== History ==
The Palakkad Fort is said to have existed from very ancient times, but believed to be constructed in present form in 1766 A.D, but little is known of its early history. The local ruler, Palakkad Achchan, was originally a tributary of the Zamorin, but had become independent before the beginning of the eighteenth century. In 1757 he sent a deputation to Haider Ali seeking help against an invasion threatened by the Zamorin. Haider Ali seized upon the opportunity to gain possession of a strategically important location such as Palghat, and from that time until 1790 the fort was continually in the hands of the Mysore Sultans or the British. It was first taken by the latter in 1768 when Colonel Wood captured it during his raid on Hyder Ali's fortresses, but it was retaken by Haider a few months later. It was recaptured by Colonel Fullarton in 1783, after a siege that lasted eleven days but was abandoned the following year. It later fell into the hands of the Zamorin’s troops. In 1790 it was finally captured by the British under Colonel Stuart. It was renovated and was used as a base for operations that ended with the storming of Srirangapatnam. The fort continued to be garrisoned until the middle of 19th century. In the early 1900s it was converted into a taluk office.

The fort is also known as Tipu's Fort (after Tipu Sultan, the son of Hyder Ali).
