= Aathanad =

Mountain in Kerala, India

Highest point
- Coordinates: 10°35′52″N 76°35′19″E

Geography
- Location: Palakkad district, Kerala, India

Aathanad is a mountain situated in Vallanghy, Nemmara, in the Palakkad district of Kerala, India. It is famous for the Ayyappa Temple at the top of the mountain and the festival held there annually on Malayalam month Dhanu 9 which falls on 24 December.

People from different places make pilgrimages to hike this mountain to get blessed. The Nellikulangara Temple is situated in the valley below Aathanad, where the famous Vallanghy-Nenmara Vela is celebrated every year.

The summit of Aathanad affords great views of the village of Vallanghy and the town of Nemmara, Pothundi Dam, the Nelliyampathy hills and the green carpet of paddy fields which makes Palakkad the "Granary of Kerala". The mountain is a popular location for hiking.
