= Kesavanpara =

- Village
- Country: India
- State: Kerala
- District: Palakkad

Languages
  - Official: Malayalam, English
- Time zone: UTC+5:30 (IST)
- Vehicle registration: KL-

Kesavanpara is a village in Palakkad district of the Indian state of Kerala. It is 30 km from Nemmara village.

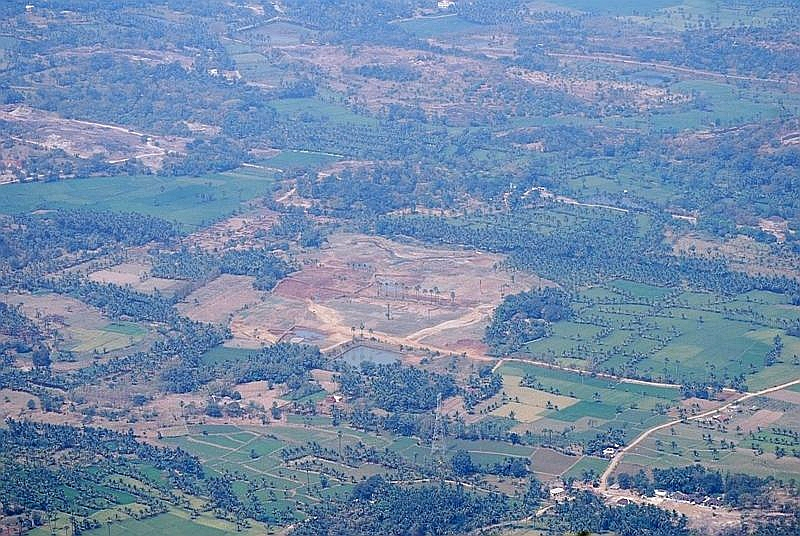
Panoramic view of the land below

== Geography ==
Kesavanpara is home to the Nelliampathi mountains, and offers a panoramic view of the land below. It is near to Kaikatty.

== Location ==
The only route is from Nemmara, from where the first town of Nelliampathi, namely Kaikatty junction, is at a distance of 26 km. At the 9th kilometer is the Pothundi Dam, a small irrigation dam which provides water for the rice fields in the surrounding area. The dam is at the foot of the Nelliampathi hills. From here, the road winds up for the next 17 km, with many hairpin turns on the way. Immediately after Pothundy dam, comes the government forest. Nearby, the tea producer A.V.Thomas & Company also has a large tea garden under its Manalaroo Estate as well as Veekay Tea Company under its Chandramala Estate.

== History ==
All the tea and coffee plantations were originally started by the British. These were later on sold to the natives. The construction took into account the cold climate of the region.

== Setharkundu ==
Another famous tourist attraction is the Seetharkundu. The traditional beliefs of the area say that Rama, Lakshmana and Sita of the epic Ramayana had lived in the place and Sita used to offer worship with the water from a small stream.

== Migrant Workers ==
The workers in the plantations are mostly of Tamil origin. They are put up in shacks known as 'padi' in local language. Manalaroo Estate runs a school and a hospital for the workers and their children.

== Transportation ==
Keshavan Para connects to other parts of India through Palakkad city. National Highway No.544 connects to Coimbatore and Bangalore. Other parts of Kerala is accessed through National Highway No.66 going through Thrissur. The nearest major railway station is Palakkad Junction. The nearest airport is Coimbatore.
