= Pathukudi =

Malayalam speaking Hindu caste found in Kerala, South India

Regions with significant populations
- Palakkad

Languages
- Malayalam

Religion
- Hinduism

Pathukudi (also Pathukudy and Paththukudi) is a Malayalam speaking Hindu community — mostly centered in Palakkad district of Kerala state, India. The community is found mainly in Panangattiri village of Kollengode sub district, of Palakkad district and spread across Vallanghy, Nemmara, Alathur, Vadavannur and Vithanaserry.
