= Kaikatty =

Town in Kerala, India

- town
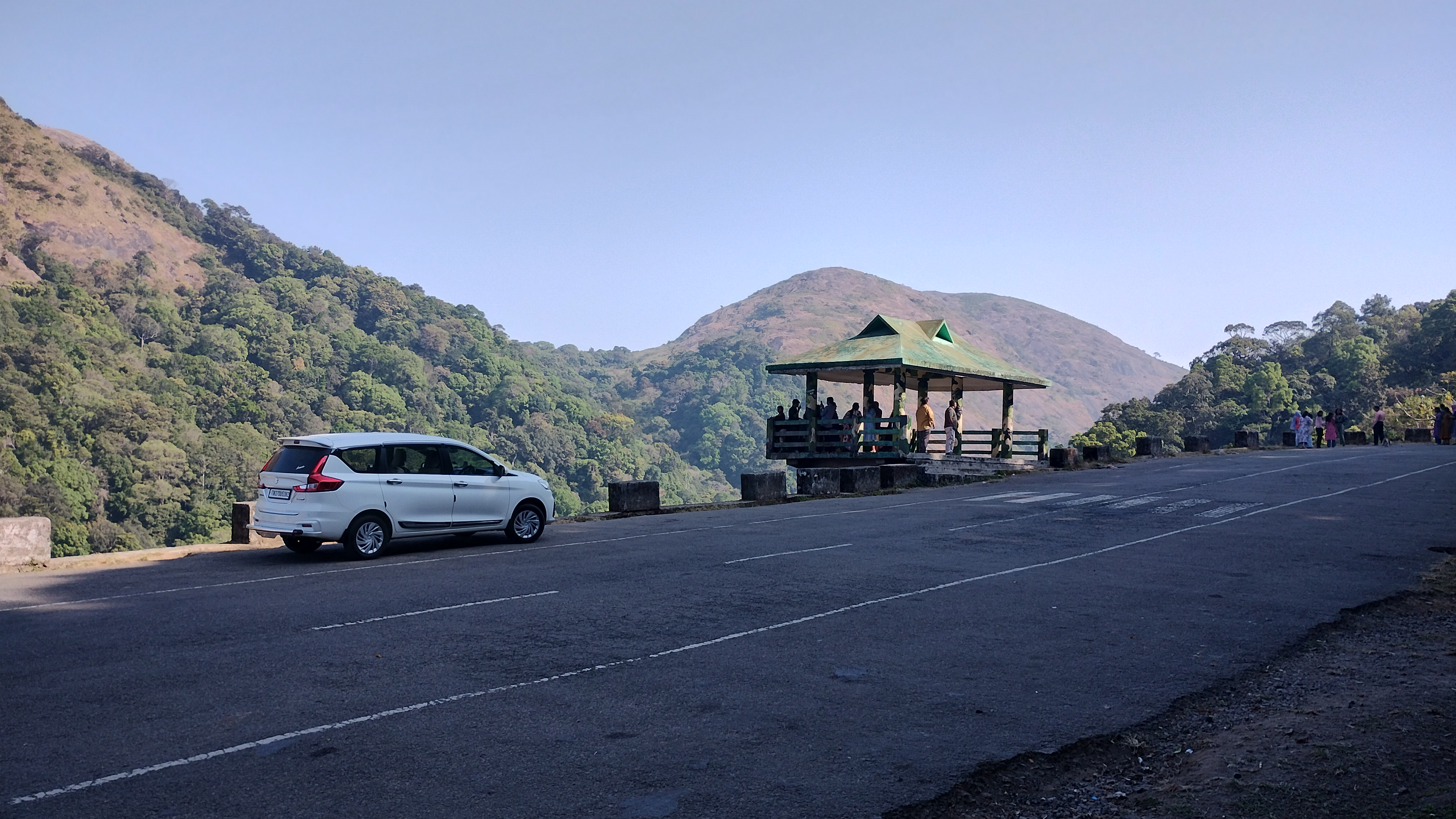
- A photo of the viewpoint near Kaikatty in the Nelliampathy Mountains (16th January 2026)

- Location in Kerala, India
- Coordinates: 10°31′0″N 76°40′0″E
- Country: India
- State: Kerala
- District: Palakkad

Languages
  - Official: Malayalam, English
- Time zone: UTC+5:30 (IST)
- Vehicle registration: KL-

Kaikatty is a geographic area in Palakkad district of Kerala state, south India. It is 26 km from Nemmara village. The area is known for its tea based economy.

== Tourism ==
Kaikatty is home to the Nelliampathi mountains. The only route is from Nemmara; the first town of Nelliampathi, namely Kaikatty junction, is at a distance of 26 km. At the 9th kilometre, is the Pothundi Dam, a small irrigation dam which provides water for the rice fields in the surrounding area. The dam is at the foot of the Nelliampathi hills. From here, the road winds up for the next 17 km, with many hairpin turns on the way. Immediately after Pothundy dam, starts the government forest area.

== Tea estates ==
Near the village, the tea producer A.V.Thomas and Company has a large tea garden in Manalaroo Estate. The Veekay Tea Company is in Chandramala Estate. All the tea and coffee plantations were originally started by the British. These were later sold to the natives. The plantations took into account the cool climate of the region.

Tea in the area is processed at the Kaikatty Industrial Cooperative Tea Factory which was established in 1976 and has made efforts to reduce its carbon footprint. They are a supplier to Unilever.

== Setharkundu ==
Another famous tourist attraction is the Seetharkundu. The traditional beliefs of the area say that Rama, Lakshmana and Sita from the famous Hindu epic Ramayana had lived in the place and Sita used to offer worship with the water from a small stream.

== Migrant workers ==
The workers in the plantations are mostly of Tamil origin. They are put up in shacks known as 'padi' in local language. The Manalaroo Estate runs a school and a hospital for the workers and their children.

== Transportation ==
Kaikatty town connects to other parts of India through Palakkad city. National Highway No.544 connects to Coimbatore and Bangalore. Other parts of Kerala is accessed through National Highway No.66 going through Thrissur. The nearest major railway station is Shornur. The nearest airport is Coimbatore.
