= Adiperanda =

- village
- Location in Kerala, India Adiperanda (India)
- Coordinates: 10°32′30″N 76°36′0″E
- Country: India
- State: Kerala
- District: Palakkad

Languages
  - Official: Malayalam, English
- Time zone: UTC+5:30 (IST)
- Vehicle registration: KL-
- Coastline: 0 kilometres (0 mi)

Adiperanda is a village near Nemmara in Palakkad district, Kerala, India.
