= Manapullikavu =

Manapullikavu മണപ്പുള്ളിക്കാവ്
- Temple/Neighborhood

- Location in Kerala, India
- Coordinates: 10°45′29″N 76°39′54″E
- Country: India
- State: Kerala
- District: Palakkad

Languages
  - Official: Malayalam, English
- Time zone: UTC+5:30 (IST)
- PIN: 678013
- Telephone code: 0491
- Vehicle registration: KL - 09
- Climate: tropical (Köppen)

Manapullikavu is a Hindu temple located in Palakkad city, Kerala of India. The temple is most famous for the annual festival that takes place in the temple known as Manappullikavu Vela. Manapullikavu is also a major residential area in Palakkad city comprising apartments and residential colonies. Manappulikavu is ward 27 of Palakkad Municipality.

Sree Manappully Bhagavathy Temple is situated in Palakkad city, Kerala . It is on the Palakkad–Chittur road and hardly 200 meters away from the National Highway 544 .Earlier the temple was under the private ownership of ‘Kenath Family’. Now the temple is under Malabar Devaswom Board (MDB). Kariyannur Manakkal Bavathrathan Namboothiripad of Pattambi is the Thanthri (Head Priest) of the temple now.

Sri Manappully Bhagavathy Temple has a very ancient history. It is believed that the temple originally belonged to Sri Mattappilly Bhadrakali Mana, a famous Kerala Brahmin family of Kerala. Numerous Bhrahmin families living on the banks of Holi River Sokanasini (Bharathapuzha) used to perform ‘Yagas’ on the river bed. Thus the area came to be known as ‘Yaga-kara’ which later came to be known as ‘Yakkara’. The eastern part of Yakkara where the temple is located, is called East Yakkara and the other side as ‘West Yakkara’. It is believed that the ‘Moolasthanam’ of Bhagavathy was at West Yakkara and it was subsequently shifted to the present Sanctum Santorum of the East Yakkara temple. (It is believed that a saintly Brahmin of Yagakkara conducted his prayers in his kitchen which is also called as ‘madappalli’. It is considered that in the course of time and usage, the area came to be known as "Manappulli").

Sree Manappulli Bhagavathi is Bhadrakaali and was born out of the sacred "Jada" of Lord Shiva during Dakshayaga. She is black in colour, with four hands, each one having Soolam, Kapalam, Gadkam and Khedam. She is with three eyes, two ‘Dhamshtram’, with ‘Pattudayada’ and valuable ornaments. The Prathishta is in ‘Shanta Bhava’. During ‘Chandattam’ ceremony She turns to ‘Rudra Bhava’ and becomes ‘Shanta Swaroopini ‘after accepting the ‘Kadummadura Payasa Nivedyam’. She is believed to satisfy the desires, hopes and aspirations of her true devotees and also protect them from all evils.

According to a legendary myth about the temple, an Asura called Neelan was disturbing the people with his misdeeds and became a menace to them. The people, complained about this to Parasuraman and he in turn sought a remedy from Lord Paramasiva. Paramasiva incarnating his female personality to Bhadra Kali and sent her to Akamalavaram to kill Neelan. After killing Neelan, Kali became Manappulli Bhagavathy showering prosperity to her devotees.

The Palghat district where the temple is situated, has mainly paddy cultivation as the main occupation of the people. The district is called the ‘Rice Bowl’ of Kerala. The social and cultural customs of the people are, therefore, one way or other, connected with paddy cultivation. They believe that the Goddesses of ‘Kavu’ (temple) protect them in their ‘Thattakam’ (meaning the area where they live, surrounds the ‘Kavu’). The people make offerings to the Goddesses in their ‘Thattakam’ in the form agricultural produces having bearing on the seasonal agriculture. The people prayed for good harvest and as an offering for this, they celebrates ‘Kathir’ in the third Friday of the Malayalam month of ‘Vrichikam’. On this day, a procession carrying ‘Sarodam’, in a very ornately decorated form is taken out in the evening from the premises of Lord Muniyappan temple, situated at the southern side of the Bhagavathy temple and it culminates at the Manappully Bhagavathy temple at dusk, passing through the streets of Manappullikavu Nair Thara. Another procession from Kenathuparambu, also joins the procession at the Manappullikavu junction and culminates at the temple. An attractive part of this ‘Kathir’ is the procession carrying decorative umbrellas made of palm leaves tied to freshly cut bamboo poles accompanied by ‘drum beating’. The Kathir literally announces the ensuing ‘Vela’ festival. The procession also carries ‘Kathir Koodu’, small balls made of tender palm leaves containing freshly plucked ‘Nel kathir’ (paddy bunches) which are distributed to all the houses in the area and hung in the front yard of each house till the next ‘Kathir’. These practices continue to be observed even now with great pomp and show. After the ‘Kathir’, the next preparatory function of the Vela is ‘Kanyar’ (Kodiyettam), which is performed on the first Friday of the Malayalam Month ‘Kumbam’. The huge freshly cut bamboo pole (flag post) with a typical flag - Koora is hoisted in front of the temple with rituals. This declares and denotes the ensuing Manappully Bhagavathy Vela.

== Festivals ==
Sree Manapullikavu Vela

Some of the major festivals here are Vishu, Onam, Diwali & the great Manapulli Vela. This place is also well known for its temple processions, which would be normally conducted with nearly seventeen tuskers in minimum. The Manapulli Vela is glorified also by the firework displays, panchavadya-performances, Kathakali, Ootam Thullal, Katha Prasangam and various other cultural arts.

As mentioned, the Vela is celebrated between last week of February and first week of March based on the Malayalam Calendar year. ‘Kanyar’ is conducted on the Ist Friday of the Malayalam month ‘Kumbam’ and the Vela is invariably conducted on the 14th day after ‘Kanyar’ (Kodiyettam). A Vela Committee is constituted for the proper conduct of the Vela Festival. The entire expenditure for the festival is met from donations received from the devotees. After the Kodiyettam, many cultural events are organised in the evenings for 14 days culminating on the day of Vela, by renowned folk/cultural artists of the state which attract huge crowds. Lot of devotees from various places come and worship Bhagavathy on Vela day. The Vela day starts early with special poojas and in the afternoon, Bhagavathy starts her vela procession. It is considered that on the invitation extended by the ‘Desakkar’ (locals) with ‘Upacharam Chollal’, Bhagavathy comes out of the ‘Sanctum Sanctorum’ for the ‘Vela Procession’, mixing up with her devotees for uniting her ‘Thattakam’ and eliminating all the evils. It is noted that on Vela day, neither the usual ‘Deeparadhana’ nor the ‘Athazhapuja’ is performed, as Bhagavathy is celebrating Vela with the ‘Desakkar’. The ‘Deeparadhana and ‘Athazhapuja’ of Vela day will be performed on the next day after ‘Sudhi’ (cleansing ceremony). The ‘Chaandh Abishekam’, one of the important pooja during the Vela day, attracts flocks of devotees. ‘Vedikettu’ (Fireworks) is also an important attractive element of the festival which takes place in the late evening when the Vela procession reaches back to the temple from Fort Maidan and also in the early morning. Bhagavathy is very fond of fire works as she is considered to be born from the Jada of Paramasiva with fire and thunder. On the Vela day the ‘nada’ is opened only after Karimarunnu is lit in front of Bhagavathy’. Annadanam’ (offering of food) is conducted in which thousands of devotees take part. The day of Vela is declared as a local holiday by the government which shows the importance of the festival.

Other significant features of the Vela is the other Velas from other desams (areas) such as West Yakkara, Vadakkanthara, Vennakkara, and Koppam which also congregate at the Fort Maidan. While the East Yakkara Manappullikavu Vela remains separate at the fort entrance gate when the ‘Panchavadyam’ is in full swing. The East Yakkara Manappulli Bhaghavathy Vela consisting of the famous caparisoned Elephants, folk arts, Panchavadyam etc., reach back to the temple. Plenty of chariots (Bullock carts and other motorised vehicles) also form part of the Vela procession. When the Vela return to the temple, the ‘Panchavadyam’ reaches its mesmerising peak making the people literally dance and jump. After this, the spectacular fireworks starts, leaving the huge crowd spellbound. A vast sea of humanity assembles at the temple premises to witness this spectacular show.

After the Fireworks, the renowned ‘Pandimelam’ performed by hundreds of eminent artists begins. At midnight stage programmes will be performed. Early morning, the ‘Raavela’ starts. The highlight of ‘Raavela’ is lighting of ‘Kambam’. ‘Kambam’ is considered as ‘Paramasivas’ Jada and lighting it with ‘Karimarunnu’ makes symbolic representation of Bhadrakalis’ ulpathi. After this, Bhagavathy enters the Temple. The ‘Kanyar’ pole is plucked by Elephant to mark the end of the festival. Sudhi is performed as Bhagavathy was outside the shrine with the devotees to celebrate her Vela. ‘Eeduvedi’ announces the conclusion of Vela.

It is believed that after the evening Aarthi Bhagawathy goes to the Moolasthanam which is behind the present main temple (2 km) and returns to the Main Temple in the Morning.

Manappalli Bhagawathy is the family deity and so followers perform the Pooja and do an offering before starting any function such as marriage; after the marriage the newlyweds go to the temple and take the blessings.

== See also ==
- Manappullikavu Vela
- Temples of Kerala
