= Nemmara Gram Panchayat =

Local self-government body in Kerala, India

Nemmara is a gram panchayat in the Palakkad district, state of Kerala, India. It is the local government organisation that serves the villages of Nemmara and Vallanghy. It is also an intermediate panchayat, subordinate to the Palakkad zilla panchayat.
