= Choolannur Pea Fowl Sanctuary =

Bird sanctuary in Kerala, India

- IUCN category IV (habitat/species management area)
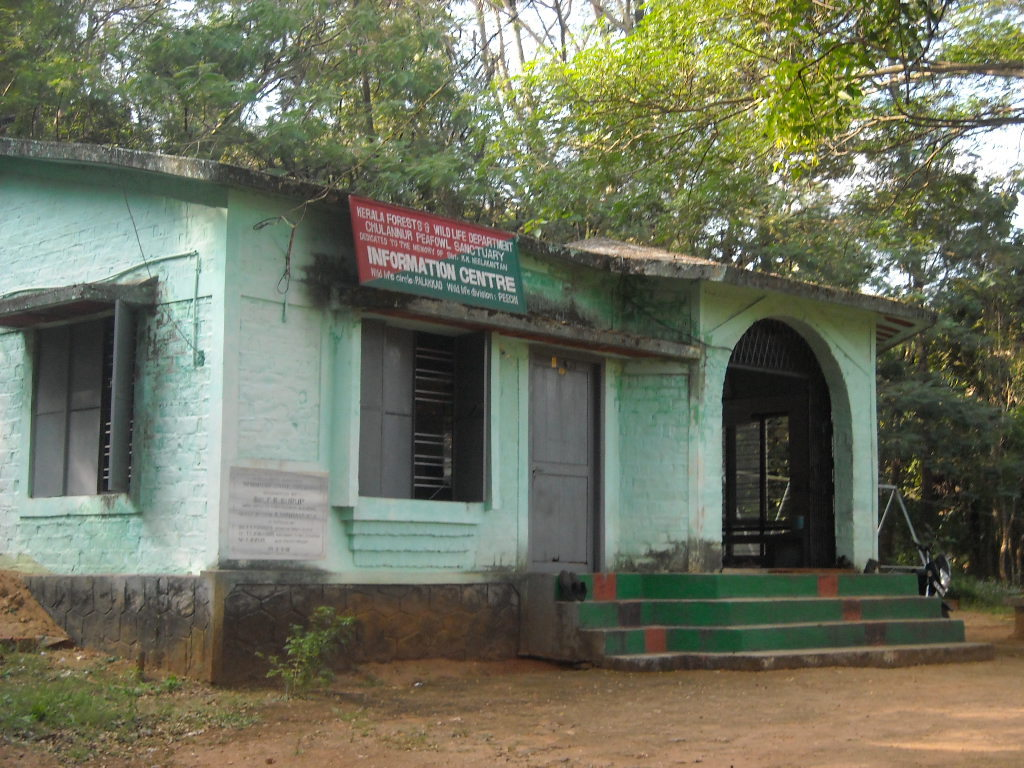

- Location within Kerala Location within India
- Interactive map of Choolannur Pea Fowl Sanctuary
- Location: Peringottukurussi Grampanchayat, Palakkad district, Kerala, India
- Coordinates: 10°42′52″N 76°28′20″E
- Area: 3.42 km^{2} (1.3 sq mi)
- Established: 2007
- Governing body: Department of forests, Government of Kerala

Choolannur Pea Fowl Sanctuary is a bird sanctuary located in Chulanur village in Palakkad district of Kerala state, south India. The place where sanctuary is located is locally known as Mayiladumpara, which literally means "the rock where peacocks dance". As of 2022, it is the only peafowl sanctuary in Kerala.

== History ==
As per government order numbered G.O.(P) 24/2007/F&WLD, Choolannur Pea Fowl Sanctuary was established on 15 May 2007.

== Description ==
It's located in Palakkad district of Kerala. This bird sanctuary is under the jurisdiction of the Peechi Forest Division and was established in the memory of the famous Indian ornithologist and writer Induchoodan.

The peafowl sanctuary covers an area of 5 km^{2} (1.9 sq mi). Apart from peafowl, hundreds of other species of birds can also be seen here. As of 2022, it is the only peafowl sanctuary in Kerala.

== Society and culture ==
When Rajasthan High Court Justice Mahesh Chandra Sharma made the highly controversial remark that peacocks do not mate and that female peacocks conceive from the tears of male peacocks, the number of visitors to the peacock sanctuary increased.

== Gallery ==
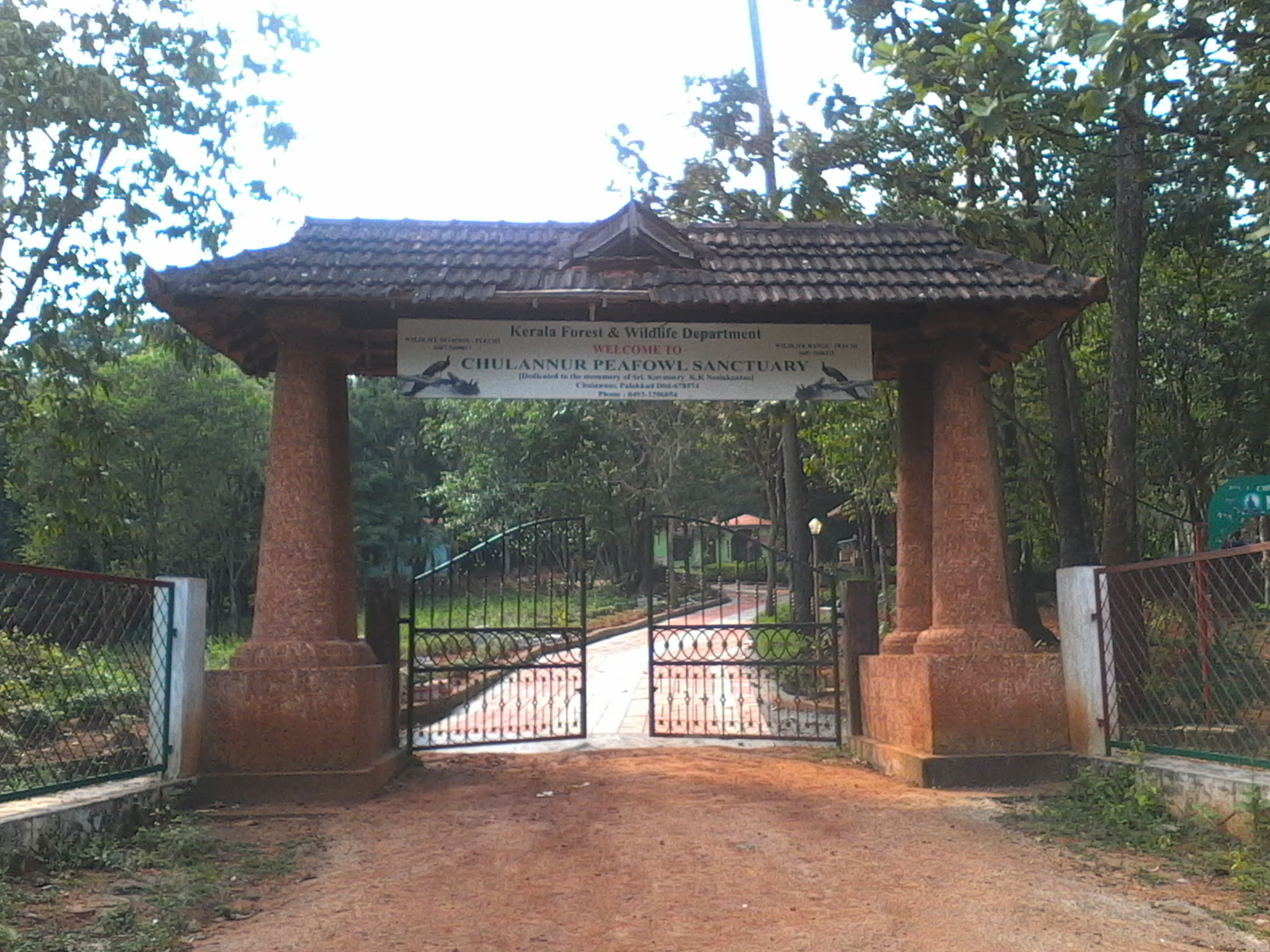
Choolannur Peafowl Sanctuary gate

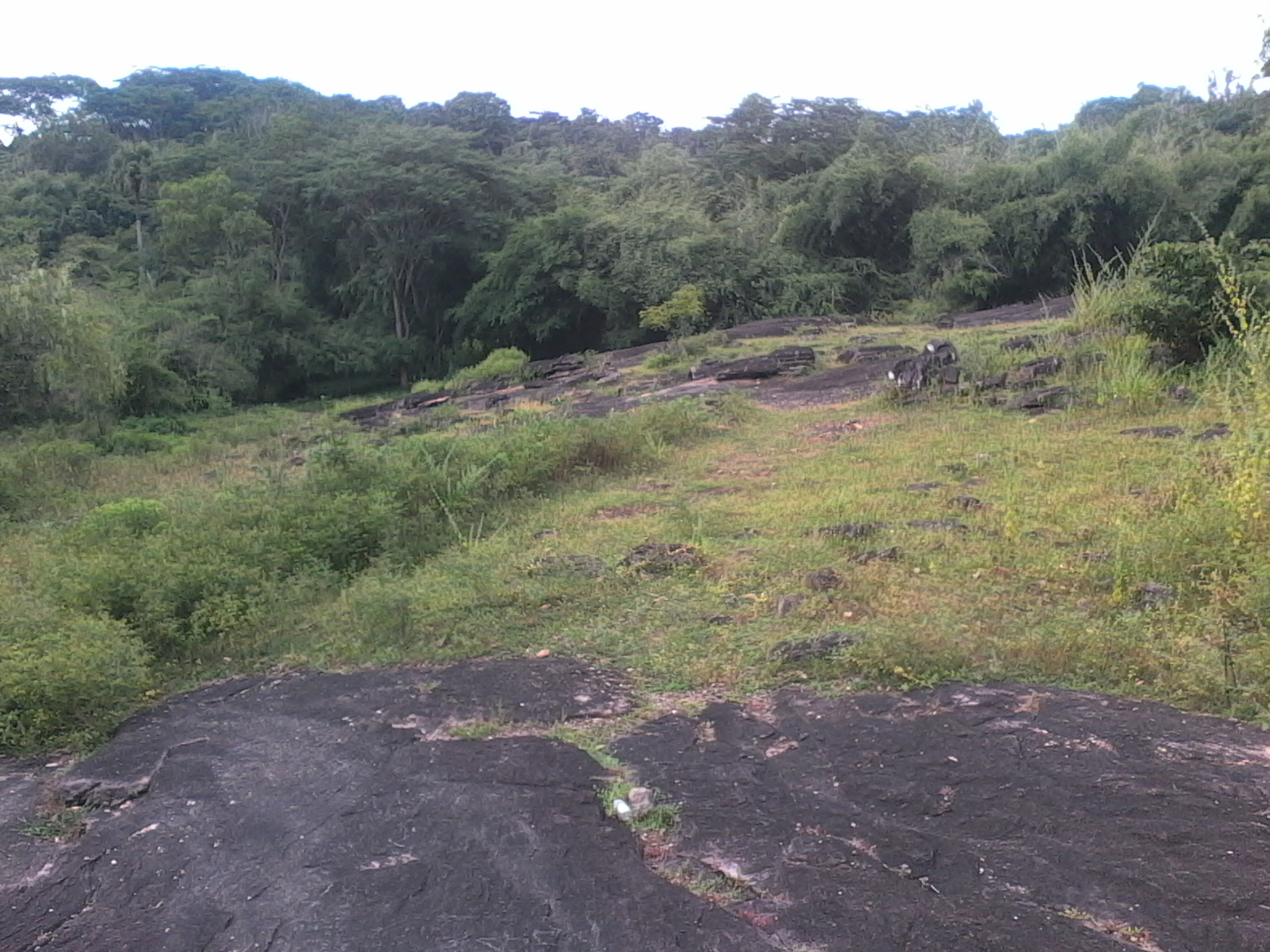
Rocky patches of Choolannur

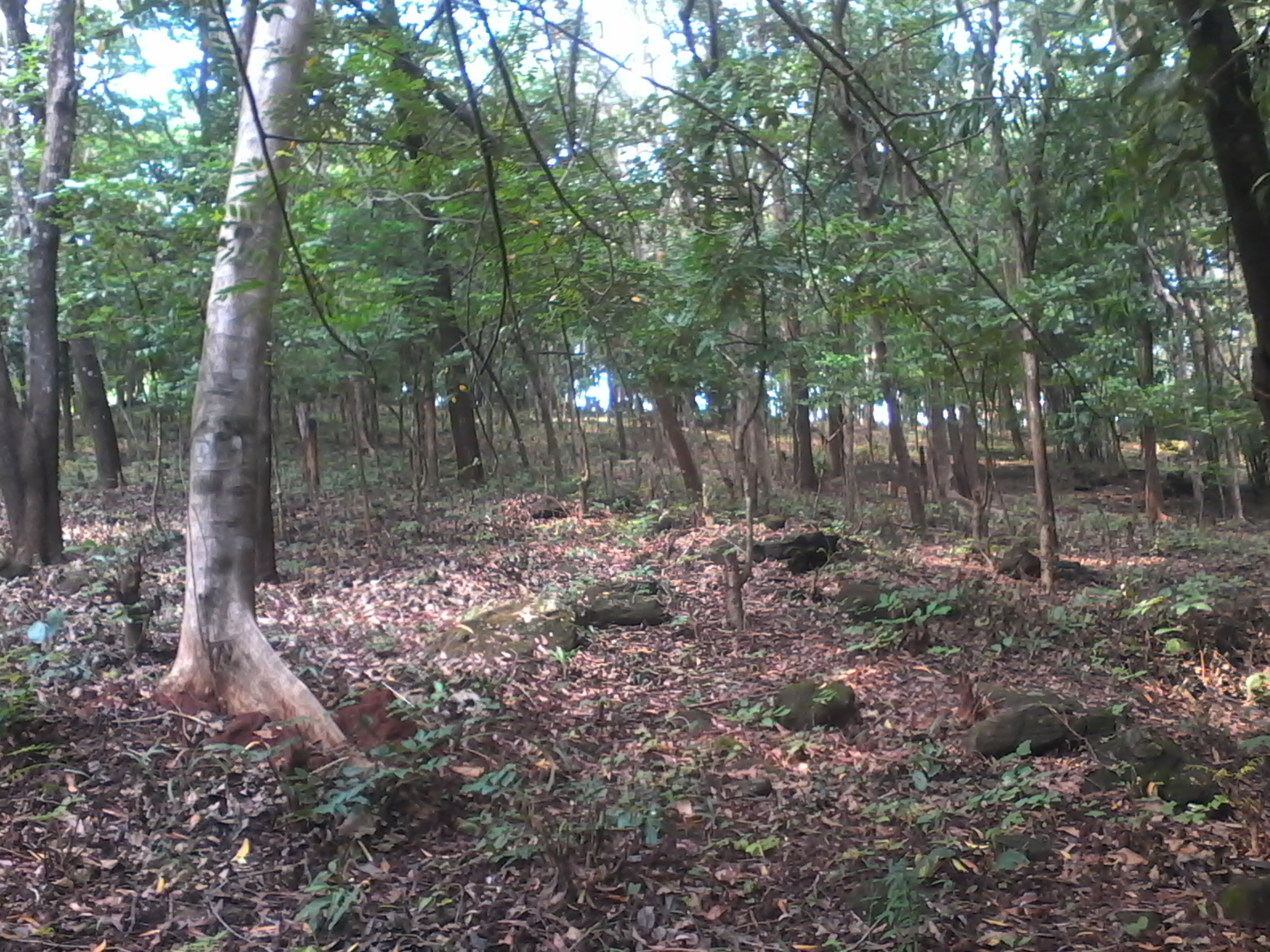
Flora and fauna-Choolannur
