= Tattamangalam Kuthira Vela =

Full-black body paint festival in Kerala, India

Tattamangalam Kuthira Vela or Angadi Vela is a festival conducted in a small village called Tathamangalam in the Palakkad District of Kerala, south India. Kuthira means "horse" and Vela means "festival" in the Malayalam language. During the festival, a grant horse race is conducted by the local people.

Many volunteers are painted black with charcoal; these men, called Kari Vela, act as guards to manage spectators along the roadside during the race.

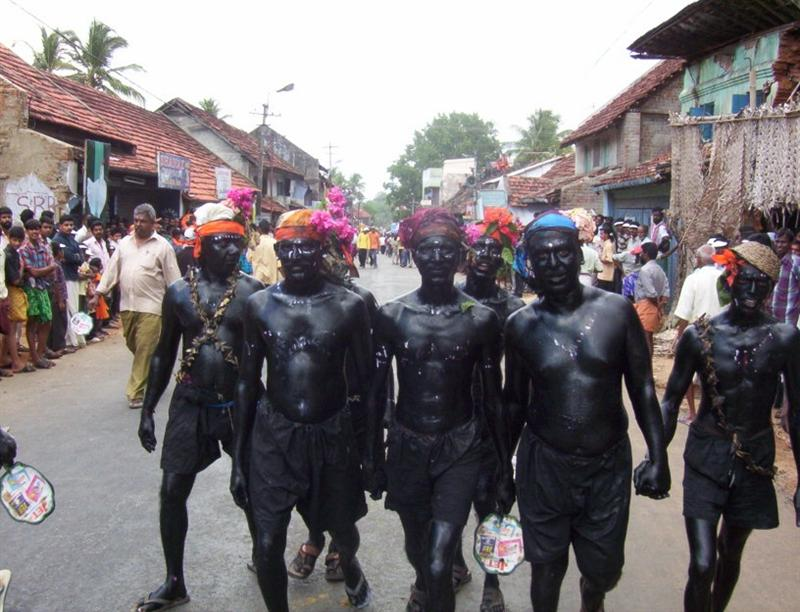
Body-painted men during Kuthiravela 2005

During Kuthiravela, thousands of people gather on both sides of the state highway 27 from KSEB office to Vettakkaruppan swamy temple.

== See also ==
- Nemmara Vela, festival in India
