= Karivela =

Ritual

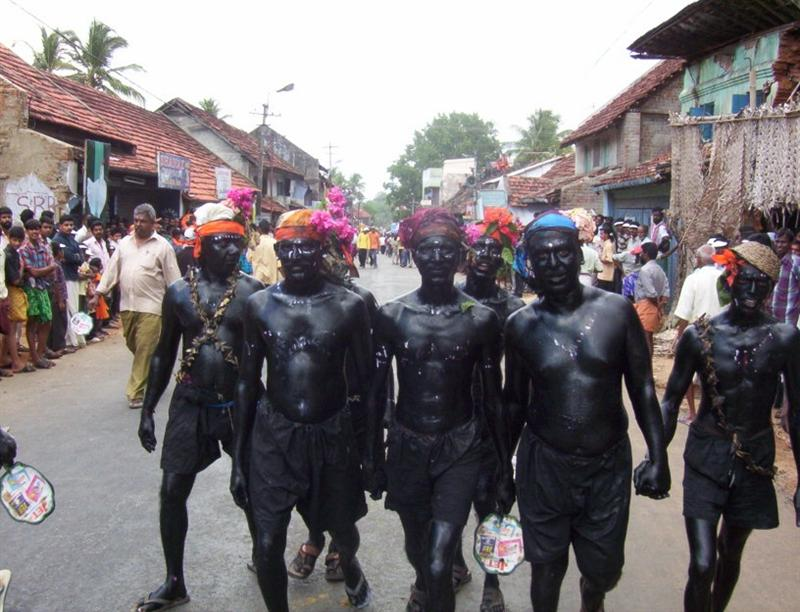
Men with painted bodies at Tattamangalam Kuthira Vela

Karivela (or Kari Vela) is a ritual usually seen in the Palakkad District of Kerala, India, in which many volunteers paint themselves black with charcoal (Kari in Malayalam language) and walk through the streets.

Karivela is conducted as part of festivals such as Nemmara Vela and Kuthira Vela, with the volunteers acting as guards to control festival spectators.

At the Nenmara Vallangi Vela, held at the Nellikulangara Bhagavathy Temple and organised by the two desams of Nenmara and Vallanghy, karivela is one of the folk performances staged alongside Kummatti and andivela, together with caparisoned elephants, panchavadyam and fireworks.

Blackening the body, also called karivesham, is seen in parts of Palakkad and Thrissur during the Vishu vela, which marks the end of the harvest and the start of the planting season. Those who take part hold that it brings them good luck for the coming year.

== See also ==
- Blackface
