= Chulanur =

Chulanur Chulanur
- village
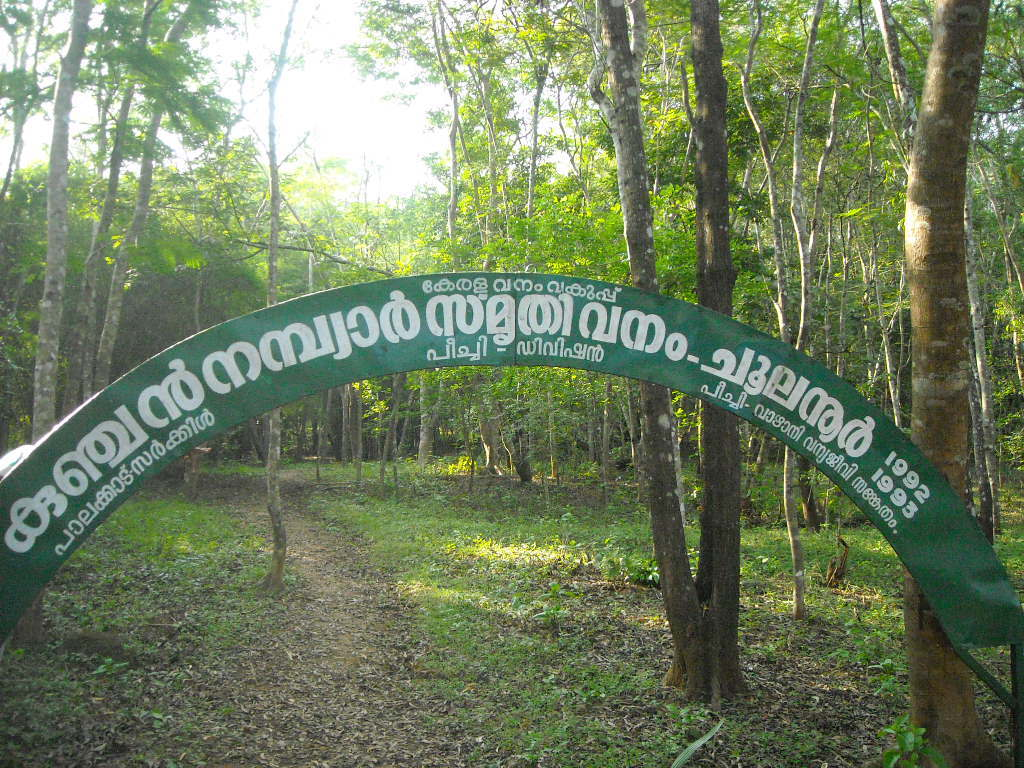
- Memorial for poet Kunjan Nambiar
- Interactive map of Chulanur
- Coordinates: 10°42′0″N 76°28′0″E
- Country: India
- State: Kerala
- District: Palakkad

Government
  - Type: democratic
  - Body: panchayath

Languages
  - Official: Malayalam, English
- Time zone: UTC+5:30 (IST)
- PIN: 678574
- Vehicle registration: KL-49
- Nearest city: Thiruvillwamala of Thrissur District
- Lok Sabha constituency: Alathur

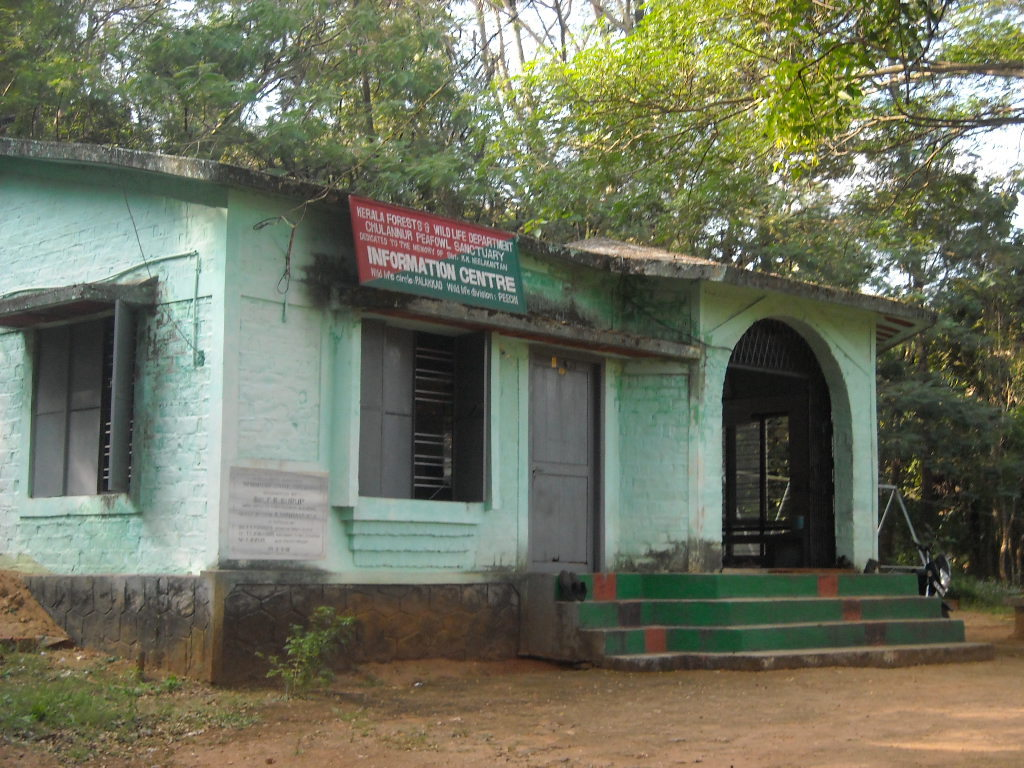
Peacock Farm

Chulanur is a small village in Palakkad district of Kerala state, south India. Chulanur is famous for peacocks. Choolannur Peafowl Sanctuary, the only Peafowl sanctuary in Kerala is located in this village.
