= Manappullikavu Vela =

Hindu temple

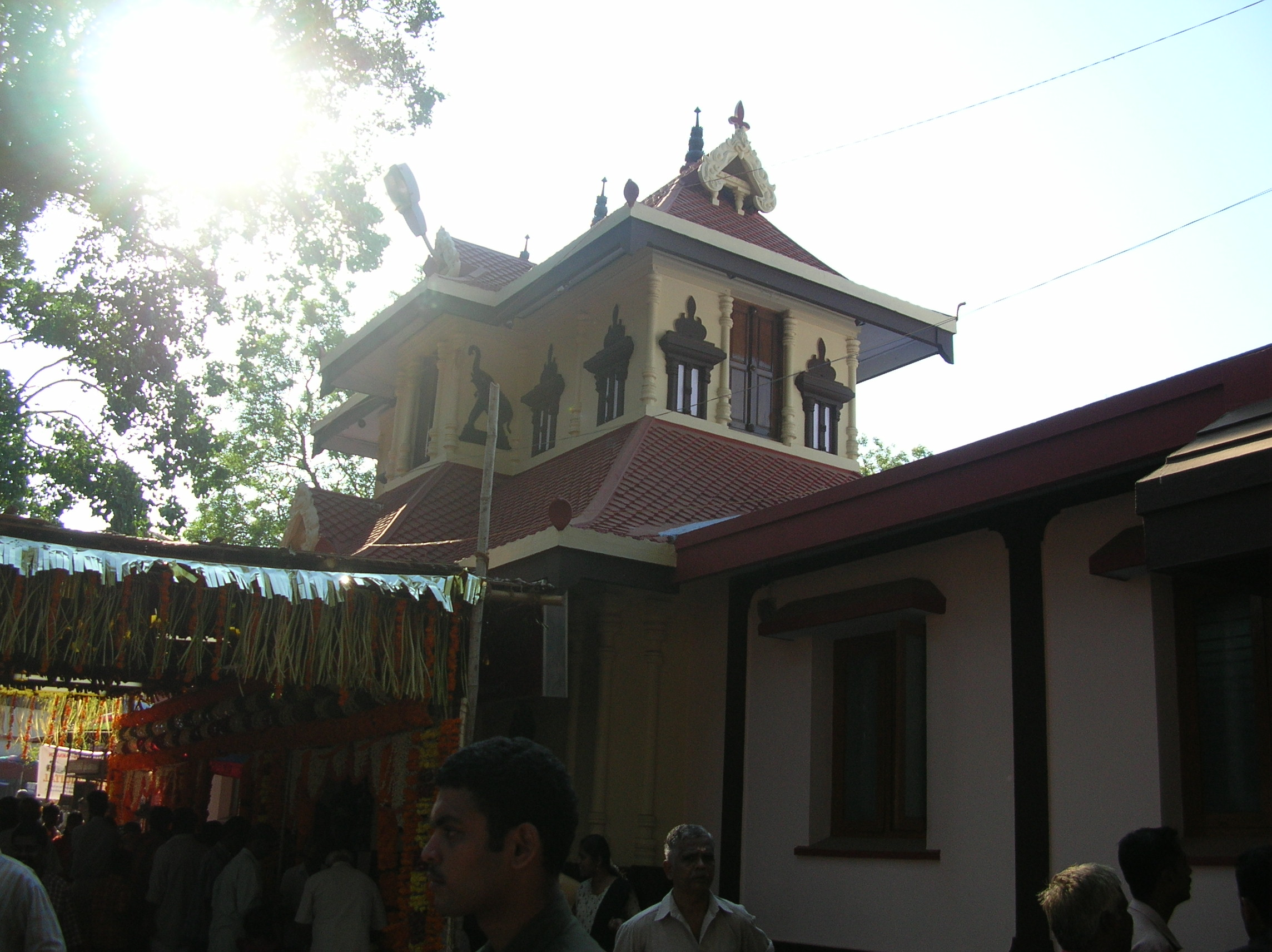
Manapullikavu Temple

Manapullikavu is a Hindu temple dedicated to Mother Goddess, situated in Palakkad city, Kerala, India. Manapullikavu Vela is an annual festival that takes place in the temple. It is organised by 8 sets of commities or deshams. Elephants and fireworks are the highlights of the festival. Palakkad at Sree Manappullikkavu Bhagavathy Temple is dedicated to Badrakali. In the moolasthanam of West Yakkara, the presence of Manapulli Amma extends to sthanams in East Yakkara, Kallikkad, Koppam, and the recently renovated Kallikkad Manapulli Kavu, located near Mercy College.

== Legend ==
A saintly Brahmin once prayed and perfected the Manappully Bhagavathy, so the folklore goes. He did the prayers in his kitchen which is also known as the madappalli. That must be in course of time and usage, become "Manappulli". This Brahmins house was part of the "Yagakkara" where Agnihothra yagas were performed. This in turn must have changed to become "Yakkara" the present name. It is presumed that the place where this temple is situated derived its name from this.

Sree Manappulli Bhagavathi is Lord Shiva's daughter and she is Bhadrakaali. She was born out of the sacred "Jada" of Lord Shiva during Dakshayaga. Shree Manappulli Bhagavathi is black in colour, with four hands, each one having Soolam, Kapalam, gadkam and khedam. She has three eyes, four big teeth, a fine dress, several ornaments, in ghost vahana very bright and shining and fearful in appearance. She is well known to satisfy the desires of the devotees. It is said that the Goddess will be there whenever any devotee calls with real devotion.

== Festival ==
Manapullikavu Vela is a festival honouring the deity at Manapullikavu called 'Manapulli Bhagavathy'. The festival is celebrated between last week of February and first week of March based on the Malayalam Calendar year. The celebration starts with 'Kodiyettam' (flag hoisting on a bamboo pole) which declares the 'Vela'(Festival) has started. After the Kodiyettam, a week full of pooja ceremonies and evenings with colourful cultural programmes are organized by the 'Vela Committee' (Festival Committee) which all ends with the grand day 'Manapullikavu Vela'. Many devotees from throughout Kerala and other southern states of India come to worship Bhagavathy on this auspicious day. The Vela day starts early with poojas to the Bhagavathy continuing with all day poojas. The 'Chaandh Abishekam', one of the important pooja during the day attracts flocks of devotees. 'Vedikettu' (Firework) is also an important attractive element of the festival which is organized in the evening around 9 PM and early morning by 4 AM. The Vela day is declared as local holiday which shows the importance of the festival. Many other are festivals celebrated in Palakkad district. Nenmara Vallanghy Vela, Kalpathi Car festival, chinakathur pooram, Puthussery Vedi etc. are some of them. Vallanghy Nenmara Vela is considered as the top of these festivals. Vedikettu in Nenmara Vallanghy Vela is famous.

Manapullikavu Vela consists small velas from other desams. Velas from West Yakkara, Vadakkanthara, Vennakkara, Koppam are some of them. These small velas come together to make the final show. Many chariots (bull carts and other motorised vehicles) participate in Manapullykavu Vela.

Manpullikavu temple is near Yakkara village, which was the origin of this temple. The name yakkara has derived from two words in Malayalam- "Yagam" and "Kara". These two words combine to form the name "Yagakkara" which changed into Yakkara in due course of time.
