= Nemmara =

Town in Kerala, India

- Town
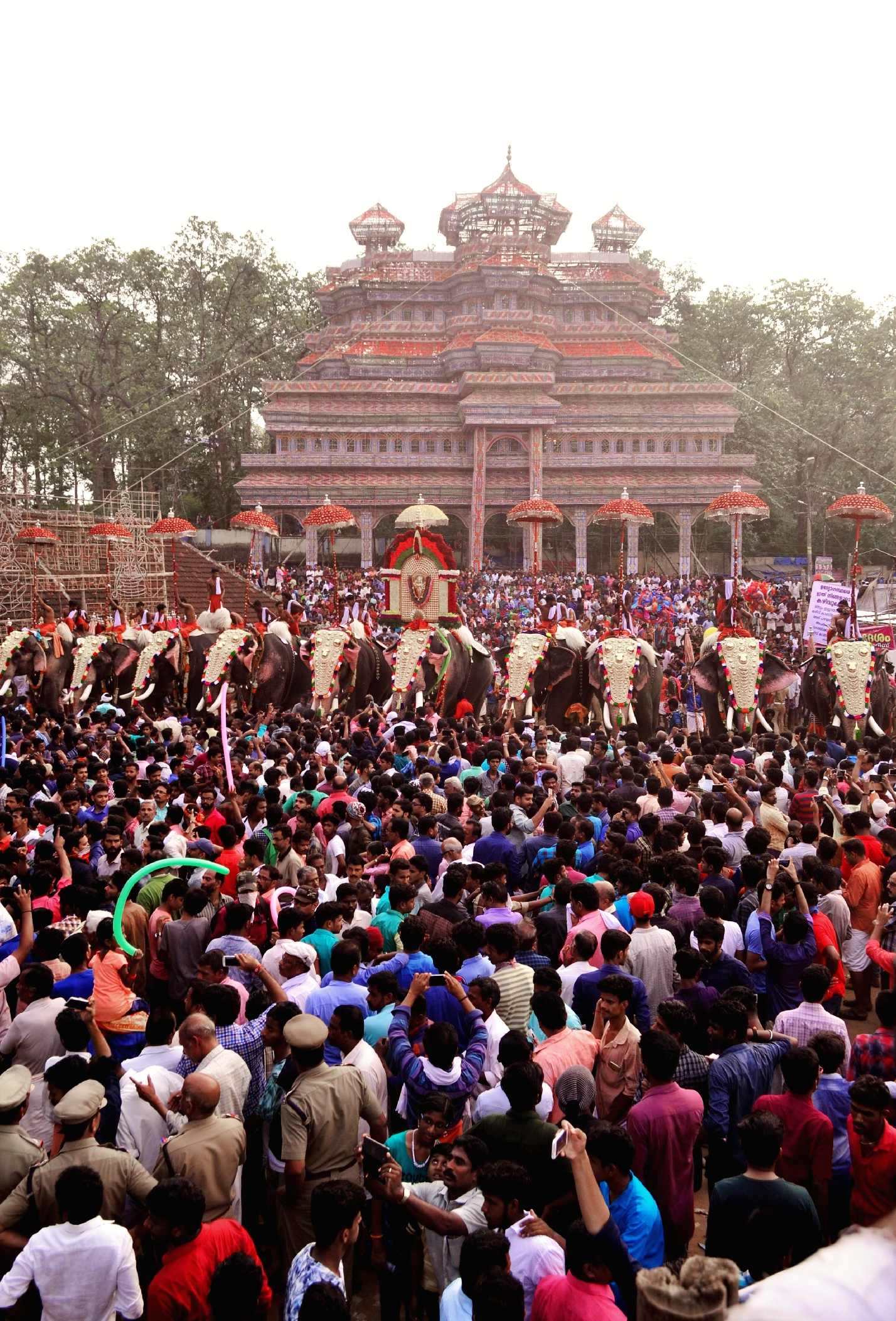
- Elephants in Nemmara Vallanghy Vela

- Location in Kerala, India Nemmara (India)
- Coordinates: 10.5934°N 76.6006°E
- Country: India
- State: Kerala
- District: Palakkad

Government
  - Body: Nemmara Grama Panchayat

Area
  - Total: 36.84 km^{2} (14.22 sq mi)

Population (2011)
  - Total: 36,549
  - Density: 992.1/km^{2} (2,570/sq mi)

Languages
  - Official: Malayalam, English
- Time zone: UTC+5:30 (IST)
- PIN: 678508
- Telephone code: 04923
- Vehicle registration: KL-70
- Lok Sabha constituency: Alathur
- Assembly constituency: Nemmara

Nemmara is a town in Palakkad district, Kerala, India. It is administered by the Nemmara Grama Panchayat. The town hosts Nemmara Vallanghy Vela one of the popular annual festival in the state with fireworks as the major attraction. Nemmara is the entry point to the Nelliampathi hills, which are located at the foothills of Western Ghats.

== Demographics ==
As of 2001, according to the Indian census, Nemmara had a population of 18,244 with 8,888 males and 9,356 females.

== Nenmara Vallanghi Vela ==
Nemmara hosts the Nenmara Vallanghi Vela, a yearly festival jointly organised by Nemmara & Vallangi Desham.

The festival is held in the Nellikulangara Bhagavathy Temple, and runs from 3-16 April each year. It involves friendly rivalry between the villages of Nemmara and Vallangi, as they try to outcompete each other in artistic ceremonies such as Kummattikali, Karivela and a parade of caparisoned elephants.

== See also ==
- Vallanghi
- Nelliyampathi
- Pothundi Dam
- Vallanghy Nenmara Vela
