= Vallangi =

Vallanghy
- village
- Location in Kerala, India Vallanghy (India)
- Coordinates: 10°35′30″N 76°32′0″E
- Country: India
- State: Kerala
- District: Palakkad

Population (2001)
  - Total: 16,808

Languages
  - Official: Malayalam, English
- Time zone: UTC+5:30 (IST)
- Vehicle registration: KL-

Vallangi is a village in the Palakkad district of Kerala, India. It forms a part of the Nemmara gram panchayat.

== Demographics ==
As of 2001, according to the Indian census, Vallangi had a population of 16,608 with 8,109 males and 8,499 females.

== See also ==
- Nelliampathi
- Pothundi Dam
