= Nenmara Vallanghy Vela =

Festival in Kerala, India

Nemmara Vela
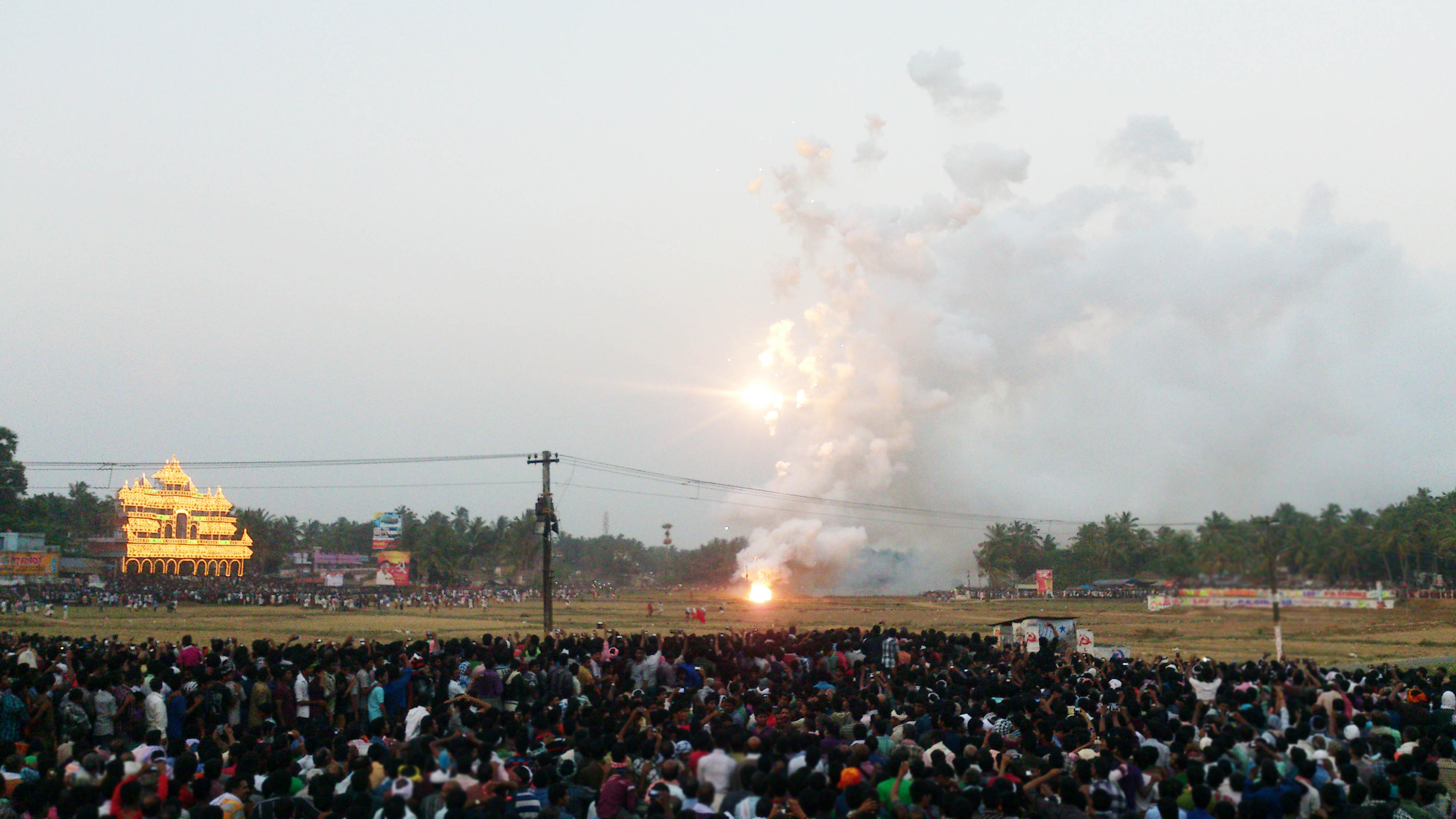
- Official name: Nenmara Vela
- Significance: Biggest fireworks show in Kerala
- Observances: Temple Festival, Fireworks, Melam, Panchavadyam, Aanapanthal
- Date: 2 April 2024 (Tuesday) Meenam 20th day in the Malayalam Calendar month of Meenam
- Duration: 3 Days
- Frequency: Once in a Year.

The Nenmara Vallanghy Vela or Nenmara Vela is an annual festival of Kerala celebrated at Nellikulangara Bhagavathy temple in Nenmara, Palakkad district.

Nemmara and Vallanghy are two neighbouring villages in the south part of Palakkad district, which is in the valley of Nelliyampathi hills. The green carpet of paddy field will turn to the festival ground in the first week of April. The Pookot Tharavadu, the feudatories of Cochin kings, organises the ceremonies and rituals in Vallanghy Desam on day of festival.The festival falls on 20th of 'Meenam' according to the Malayalam Calendar (2nd or 3rd of every April). The 'Kodiyettam' (starting) will be celebrated on 'meenam 1st' every year. The celebration continues for the first 20 days of 'meenam', and on 20th day the Vela festival will be celebrated. The annual Vela festival, celebrated by Nemmara and Vallangi villages after the paddy harvest, is noted for its display of fireworks and caparisoned elephants.

== Gallery ==
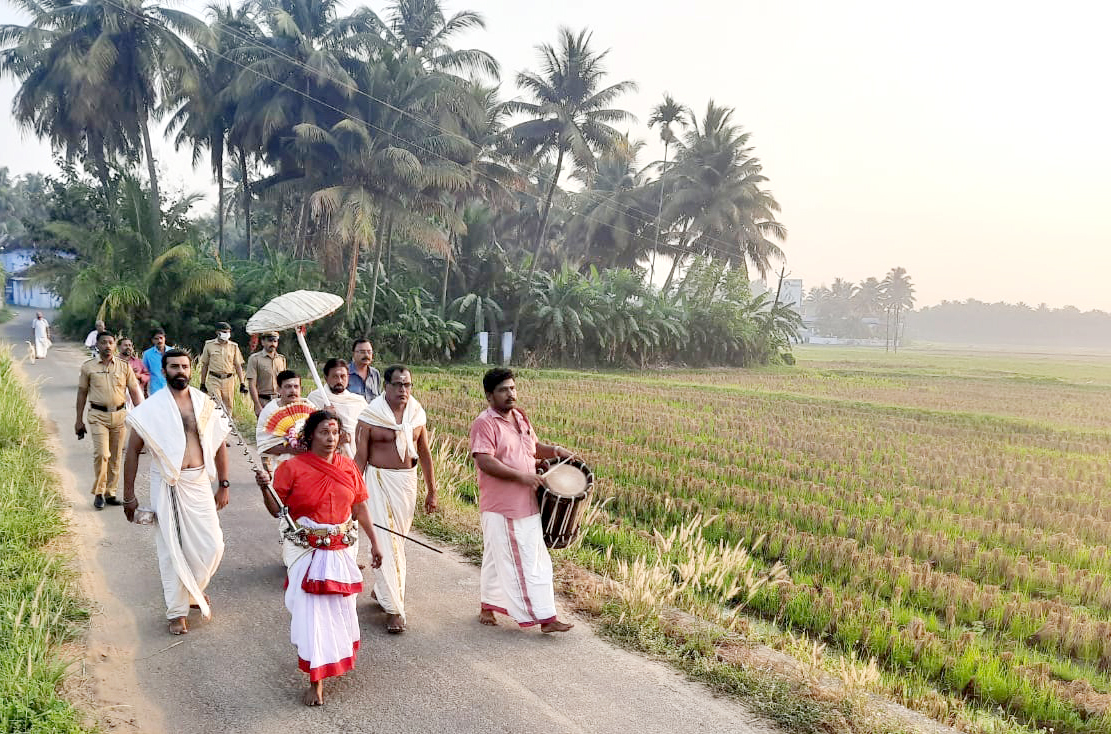
Vallanghy Vela 2020

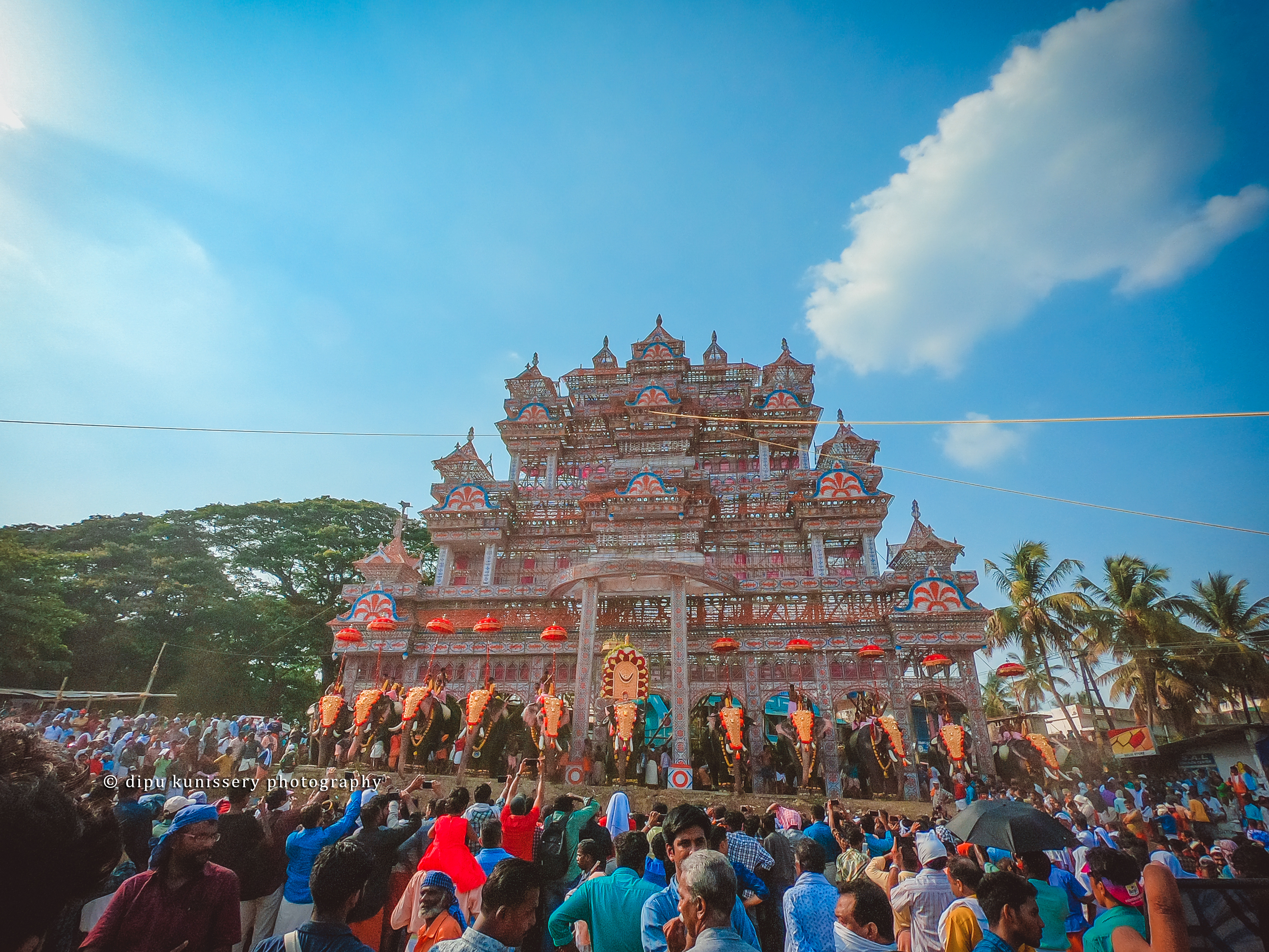
Vallanghy Vela 2019

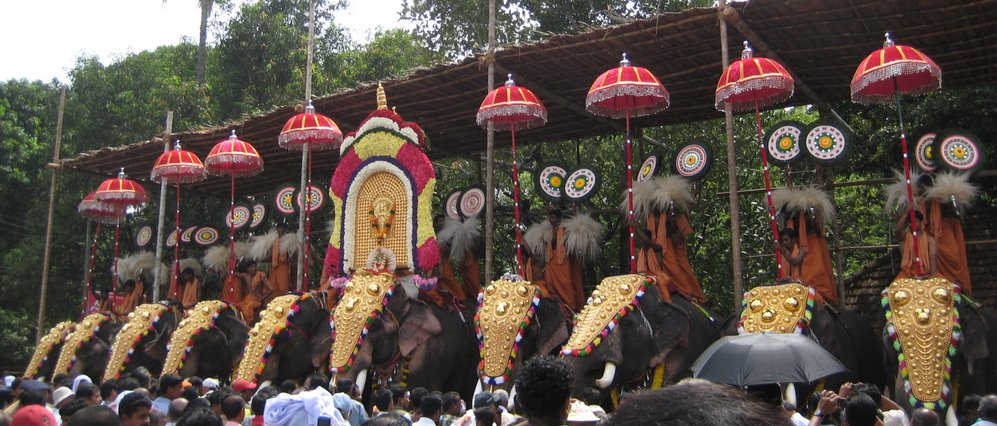
Nemmara Desam

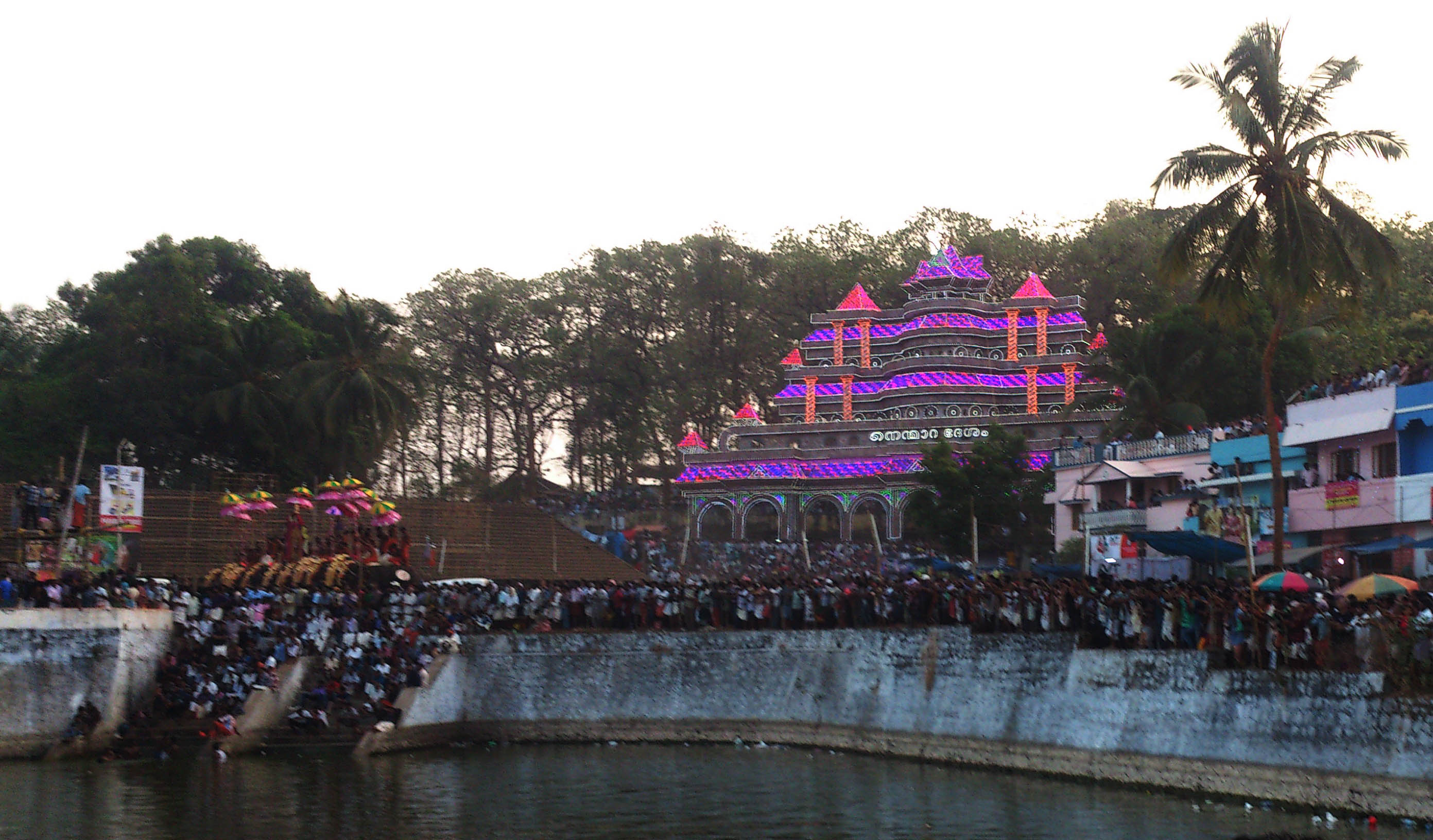
Nemmara Desam Anna Pandhal

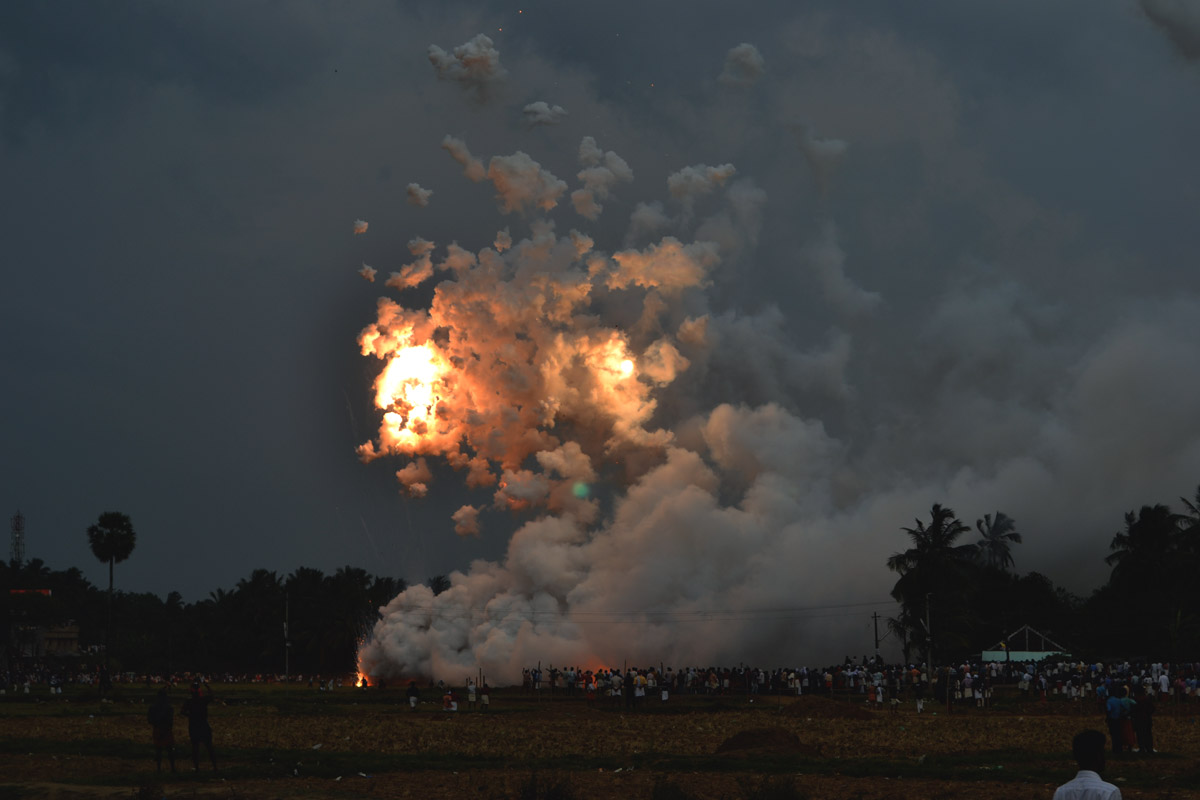
Nemmara Desam Fireworks display

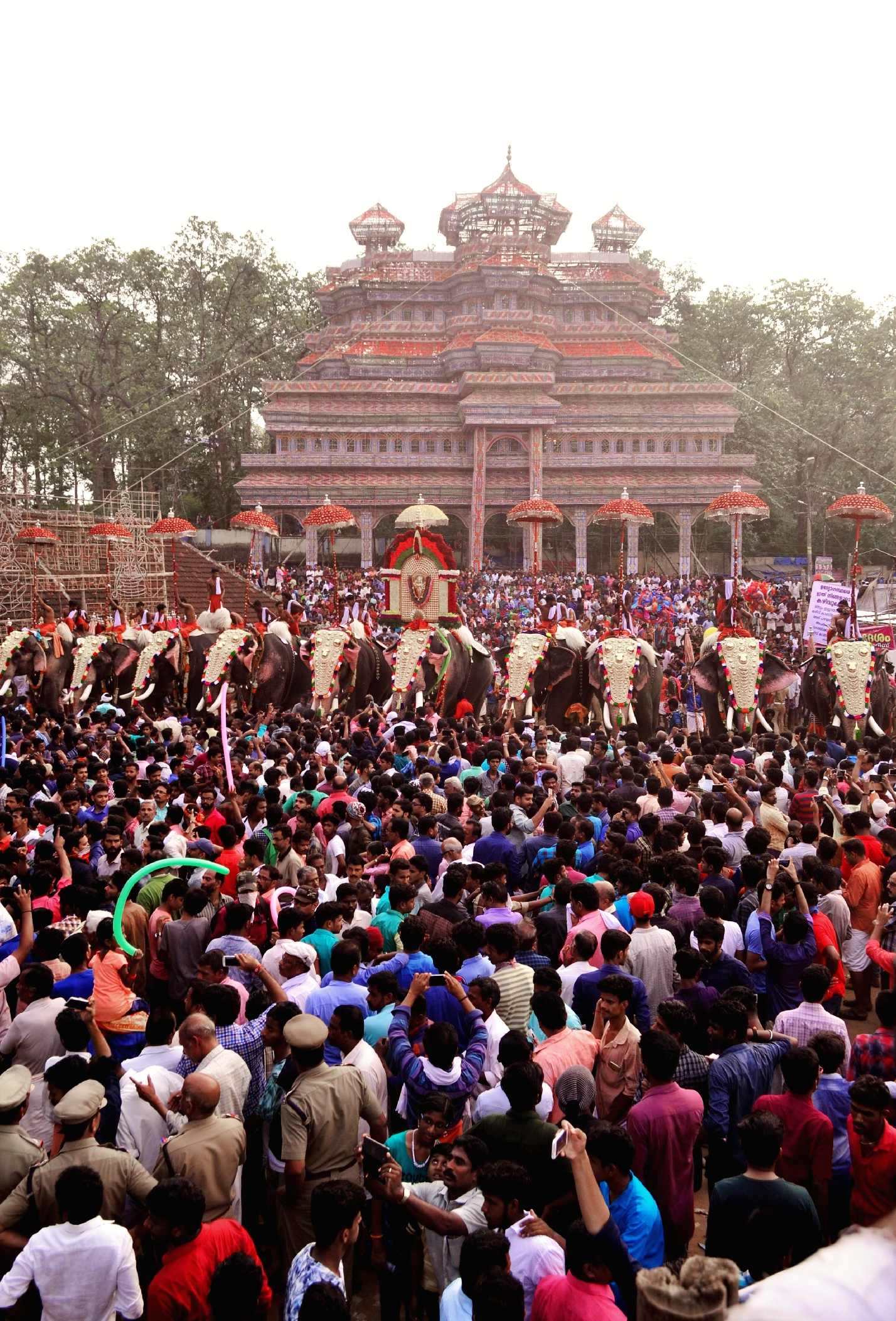
Nemmara Desam

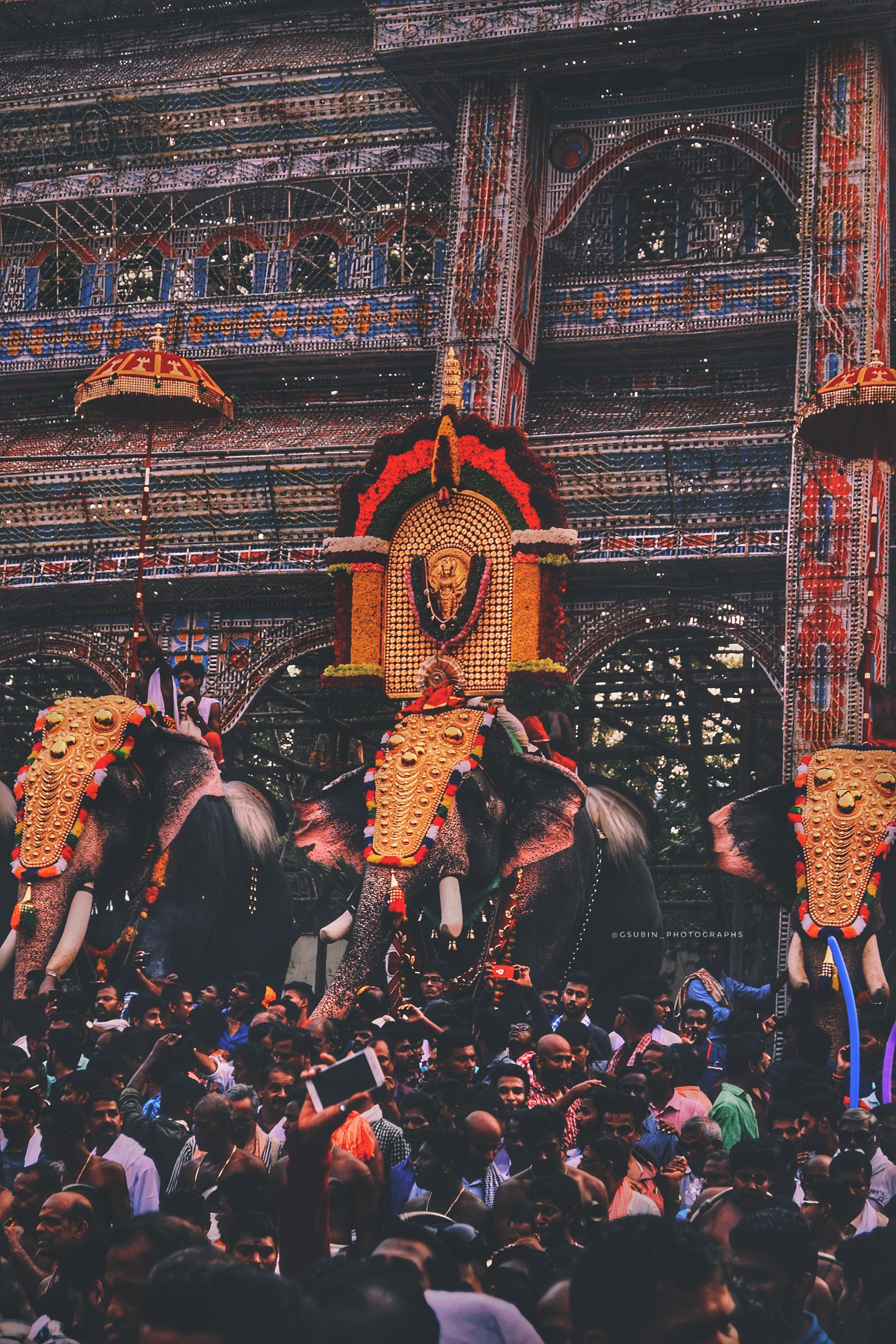
Nemmara Desam elephants

== See also ==
- Thrissur Pooram, a similar festival
- Vairankode vela
