= Pothundi Dam =

Dam in Palakkad District (Kerala), India

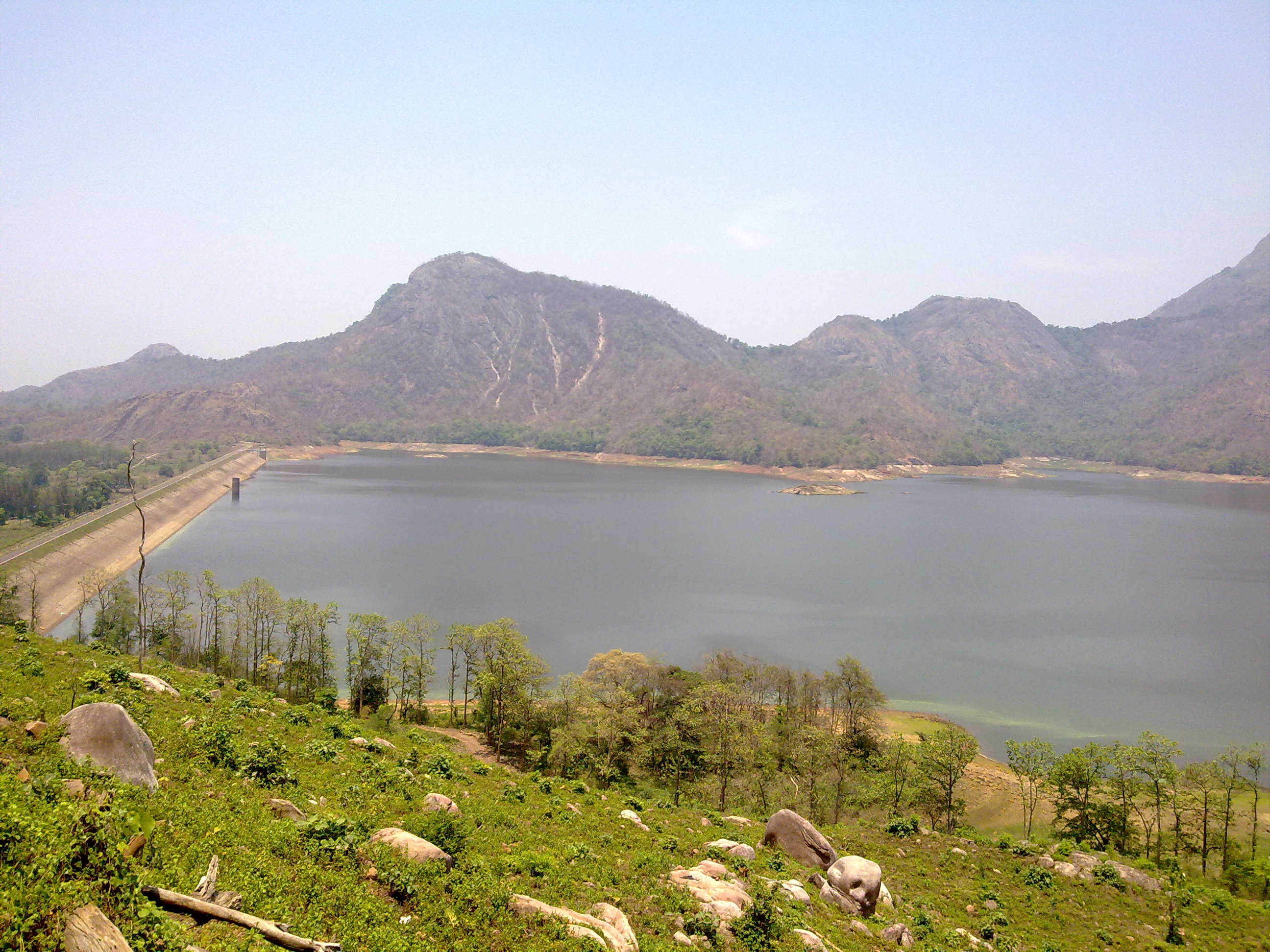
- Pothundi Dam

- 10°32'34"N 76°38'8"E Pothundi Dam (Kerala)
- Location: Palakkad District, Kerala
- Coordinates: 10°32′34″N 76°38′08″E
- Purpose: Irrigation
- Status: Operational
- Opening date: Dam in 19th century and irrigation scheme in 1968

Dam and spillways
- Height: 32.61 metres (107.0 ft)
- Length: 1,680 metres (5,510 ft)

Reservoir
- Total capacity: 50,914,000 m^{3} (41,277 acre⋅ft)
- Active capacity: 43,900,000 m^{3} (35,590 acre⋅ft)
- Surface area: 2.75 km^{2} (1 mi^{2})
- Normal elevation: 108.204 metres (355.00 ft)

Pothundi Dam is an irrigation dam near Pothundi village in the Palakkad district of Kerala state, India. Constructed in the 19th century, it is considered one of the oldest dams in India. It provides irrigation to an area of 5,470 hectares (13,500 acres) in the Palakkad district and drinking water supply to the Nemmara, Ayalur, Melarcode Panchayat. An unusual feature of the earth dam is the core wall, which is built with a mixture of jaggery and quick lime.

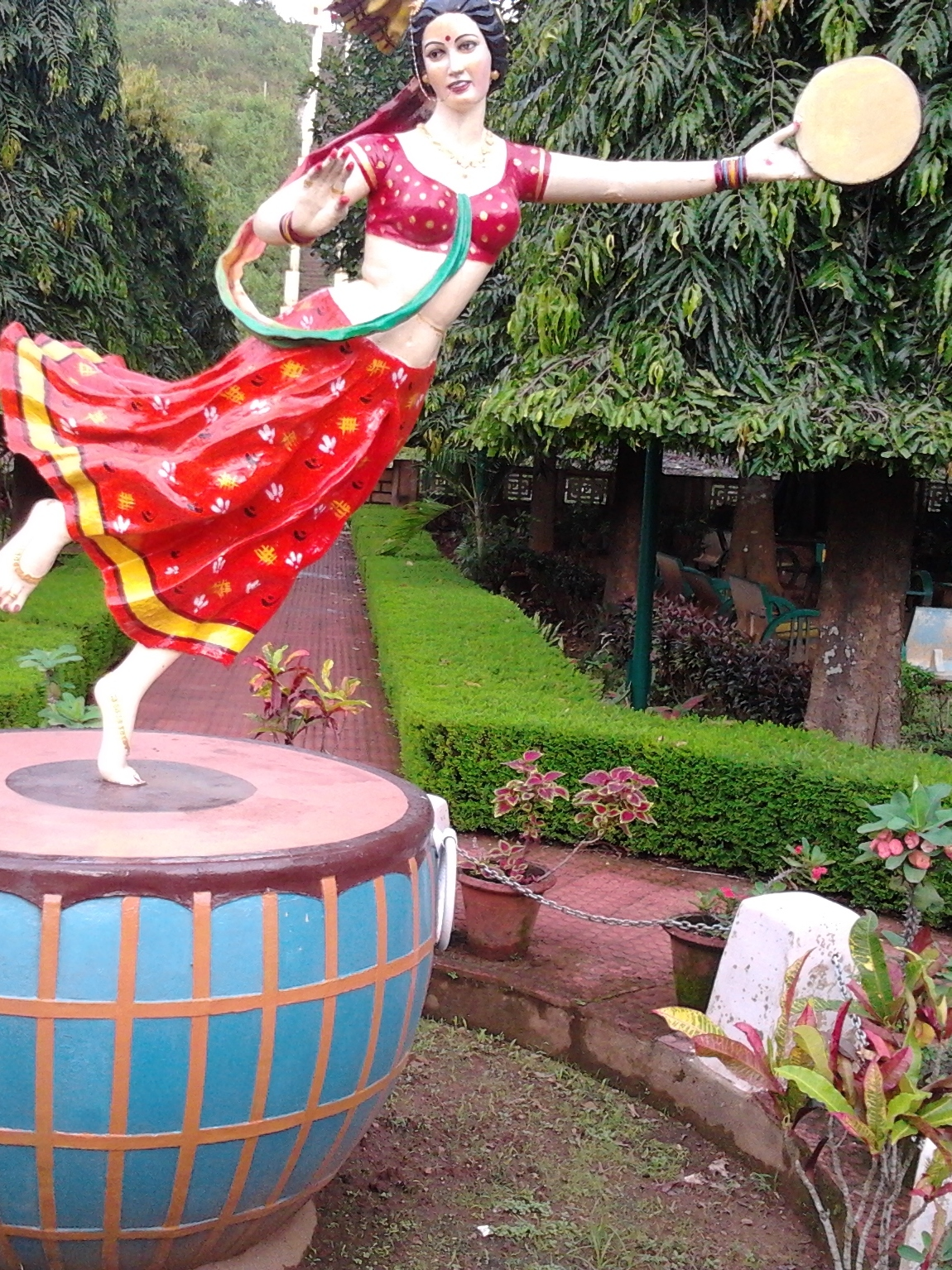
Pothundy Dam Gardens

A popular festival held on the shores of the reservoir is known as the Nemmara Vallengi Vela Festival.

== Topography ==
The dam is built in the Pothundy village across the Meenichiladipuzha and Padipuzha rivers, which are tributaries of the Aylampuzha river, about 400 metres (1,300 ft) upstream of the confluence, in the backdrop of the Nelliampathi hills. It drains a catchment area of 31 square kilometres (12 sq mi) at Full Reservoir Level, which is thickly forested with teak wood trees. The dam is in the Chittur taluk, about 8 kilometres (5.0 mi) from Nemmara and 42 kilometres (26 mi) from Palakkad and 17 kilometres (11 mi) from Nelliampathi.

== History ==
The dam, built in the 19th century for irrigation, was developed as a medium irrigation project completed in 1971 at a cost of Rs.23.425 million. The dam also provides water supply, and the reservoir has been developed as an important inland fisheries project.

== Features ==
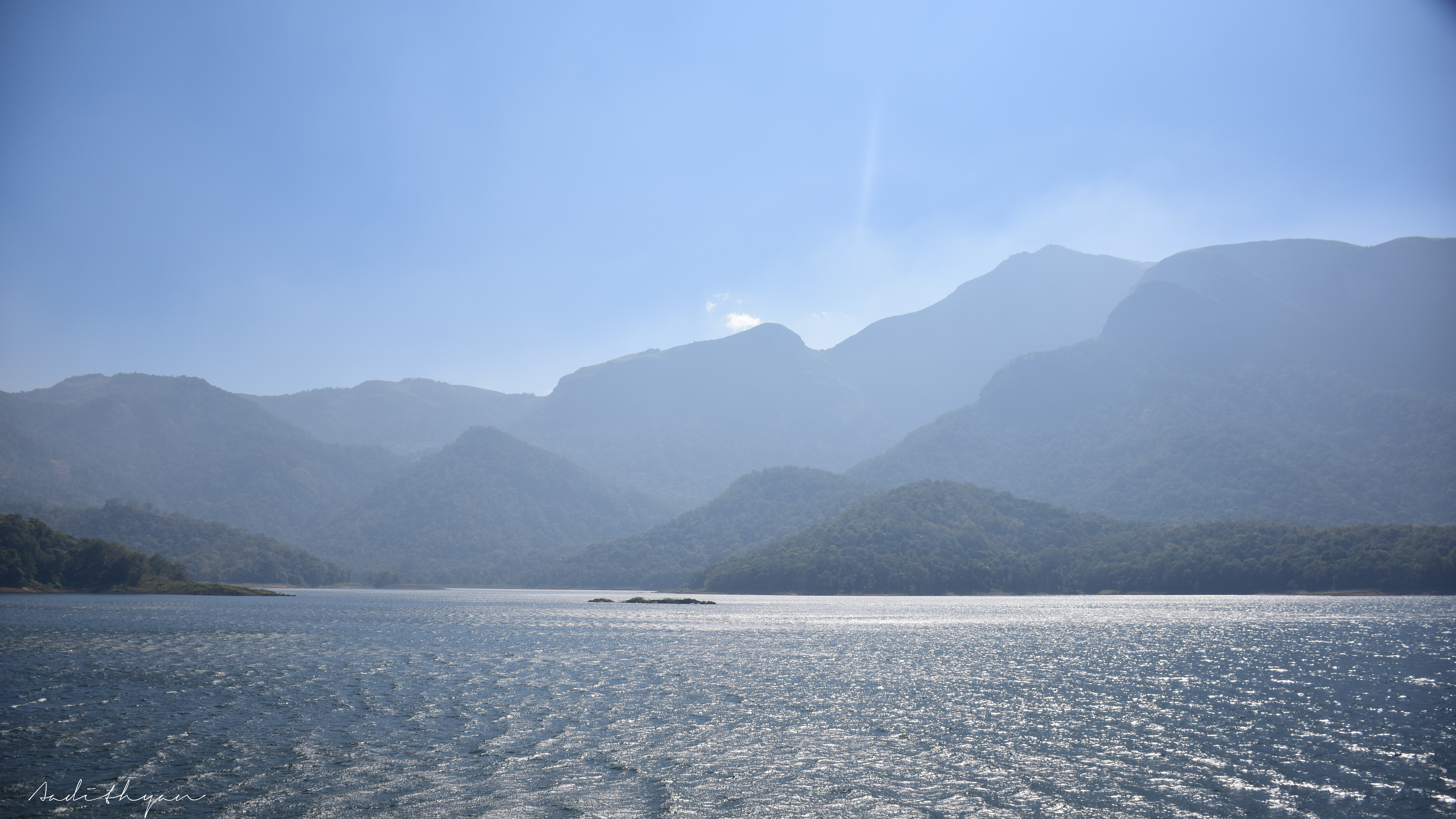
View of the Surrounding hills and the reservoir from atop the dam.

The dam is an earth-filled structure built to a height of 32.61 metres (107.0 ft) and a length of 1,680 metres (5,510 ft). The gross storage capacity of the reservoir is 50,914,000 m^{3} (41,277 acre⋅ft) and the live storage, excluding dead storage, is 43,900,000 m^{3} (35,590 acre⋅ft). It has a spillway section to route the designed flood discharge. The irrigation component of the project, completed in 1971, consists of a 10 kilometres (6.2 mi) long right bank canal and an 8 kilometres (5.0 mi) left bank canal, which provides irrigation to an area of 5,465 hectares (13,500 acres) in the Chittur and Alathur taluks. In view of favorable soil conditions, the irrigation practice under this project is a rice-based system in the Palghat plains. The storage from the reservoir is also utilized to the extent of 15,380,000 m^{3} (12,469 acre⋅ft) for providing drinking water supply to Nemmara and Ayalure villages.

Reservoir fishing is well developed and covers an area of 363 hectares (900 acres). The various species of river fishes found in the reservoir are murrel, catfish, tilapia, rohu (Labeo rohita), barbus, eel, common carp (Cyprinus carpio), mrigal, gourami, and catla. According to FAO statistics, the stocking is 1.241 million fingerlings per year with stocking rate of 684 fingerlings per ha per year. The fisheries development in the reservoir has been done under the Indo-German Reservoir Fisheries Development Project. According to the State Fisheries Department, the fish catch was about 7,057 kilograms (15,558 lb) per year during 1992–93 with a yield of 19.4 per ha. The production units proposed under this project were broodfish stock, mini-hatchery, and rearing components, apart from the pens to be set up in the reservoir periphery and the floating cages offshore.

== See also ==
- List of dams and reservoirs in India

== Bibliography ==
- Panda, Dr. H. (4 October 2013). Integrated Organic Farming Handbook. ASIA PACIFIC BUSINESS PRESS Inc. ISBN 978-81-7833-152-2.
- Sugunan, V. V. (1995). Reservoir Fisheries of India. Food & Agriculture Org. ISBN 978-92-5-103673-0.
