= Nelliampathi =

Nelliyampathy Nelliampathi
- Hill Station
- Nelliampathi
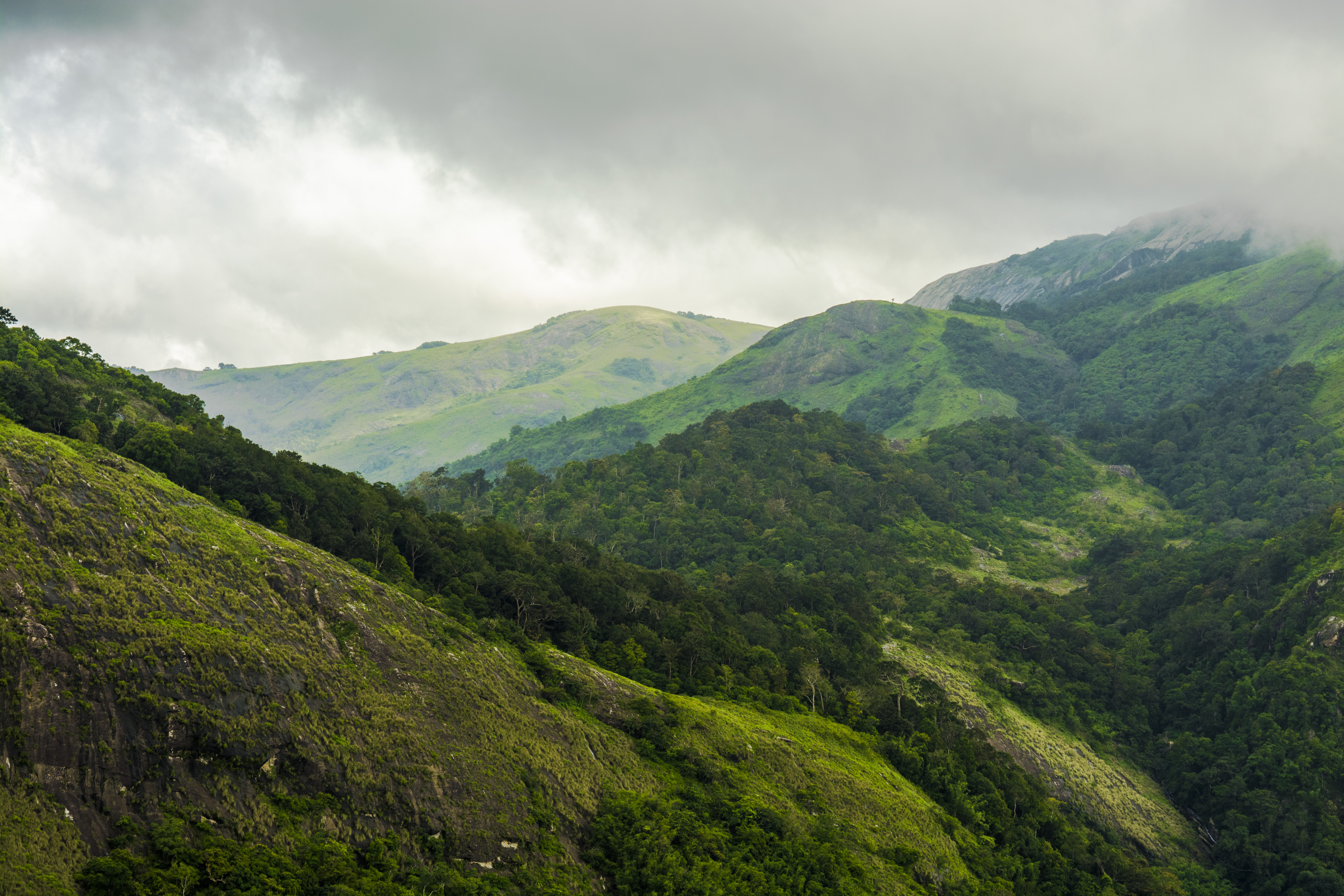
- Western Ghats at Nelliampathi
- Nickname: Nelliampathi
- Location in Kerala, India Nelliyampathy (India)
- Coordinates: 10.529627°N 76.684012°E
- Country: India
- State: Kerala
- District: Palakkad
- Named for: Nelliampathi

Government
  - Body: Gram Panchayat

Area
  - Total: 576 km^{2} (222 sq mi)

Population (2011)
  - Total: 5,545
  - Density: 9.63/km^{2} (24.9/sq mi)

Languages
  - Official: Malayalam, English
- Time zone: UTC+5:30 (IST)
- ISO 3166 code: IN-KL
- Vehicle registration: KL-70
- Nearest city: Nenmara and Kollengode

Nelliyampathy (also spelled as Nelliampathi) is a hill station, located 60 kilometres (37 mi) from Palakkad district in the state of Kerala, India.

== Geography ==
- Nelliampathy is surrounded by tea and coffee plantations.
- The village has its own gram panchayat and forms a part of the Chittur taluk. Pothundi Dam, which was constructed in the 19th century, is the entrance to Nelliyampathy.

== Seetharkundu ==
A viewpoint called Seethargund is situated 8 km away from Nelliyampathy. Seethargund, according to beliefs is the place where Lord Rama, Laxmana and Seetha rested during their exile.

== Kesavan Rock ==
Another attraction of Nelliyampathy is the Kesavanpara viewpoint. The film Mrigaya, starring Mammootty, was shot here.

== Demographics ==
As of 2001 India census, Nelliyampathy had a population of 8,718 with 4,358 males and 4360 females.

== Gallery ==
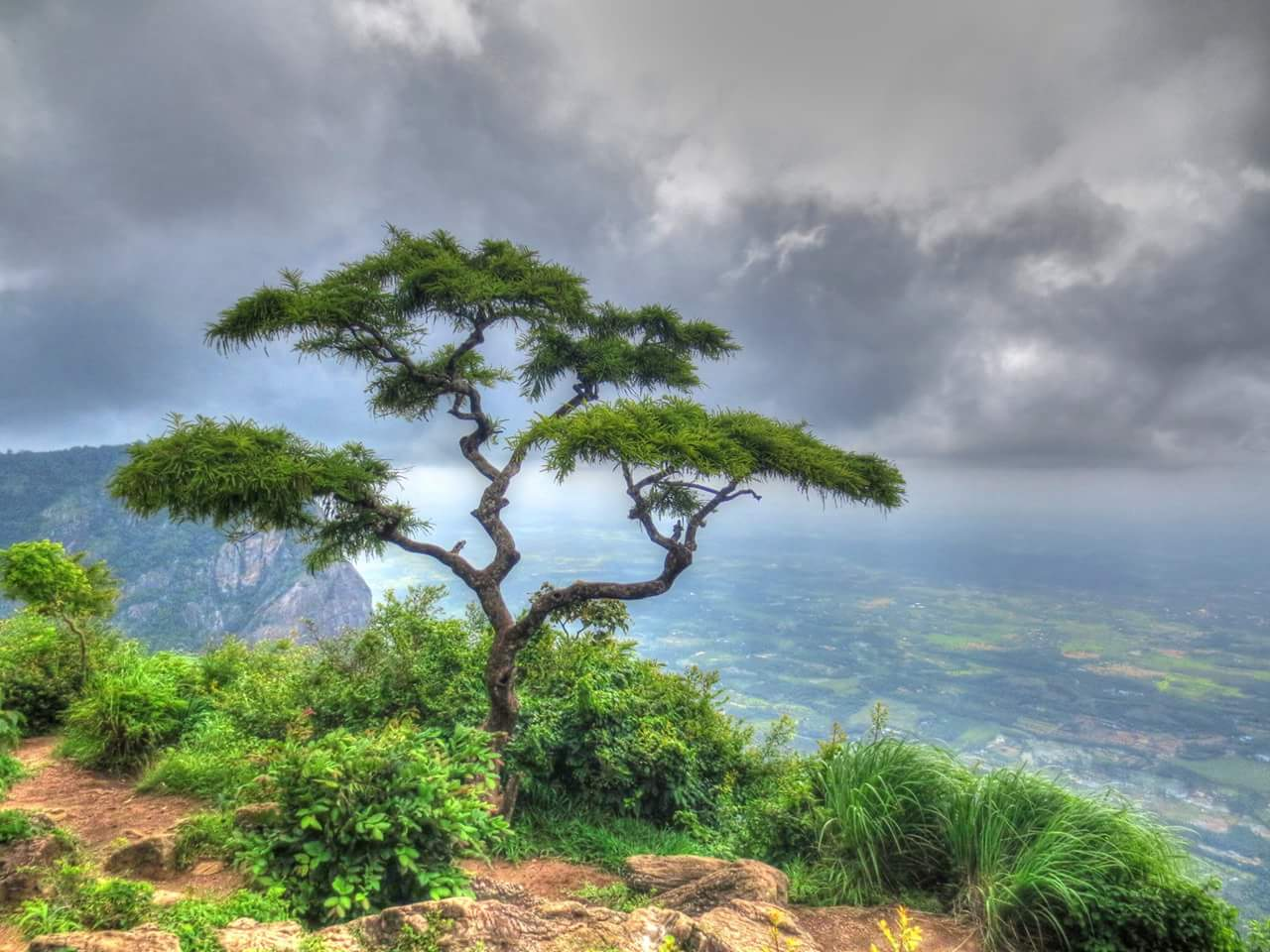
Sitharkundu viewpoint

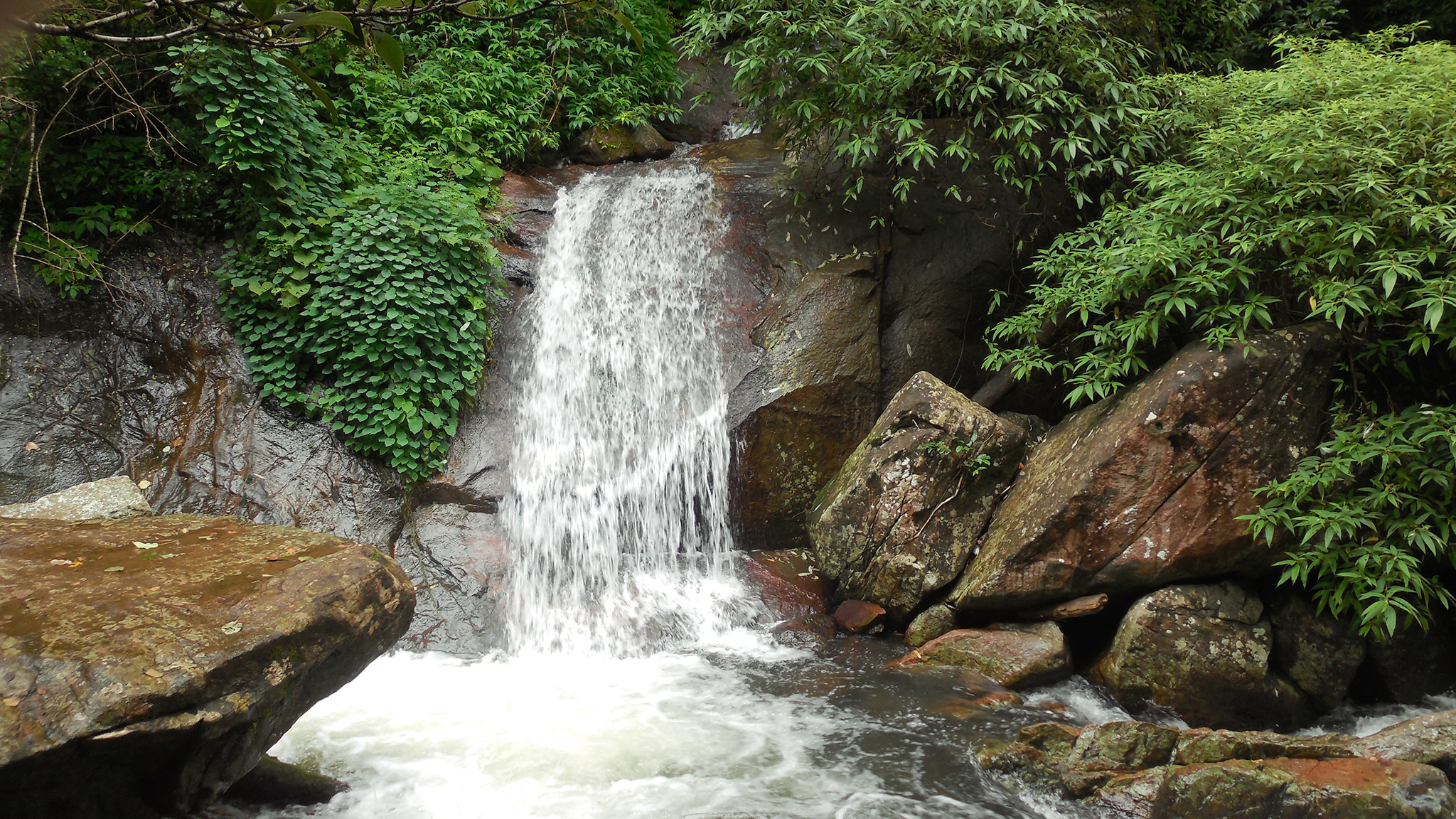
A mountain stream

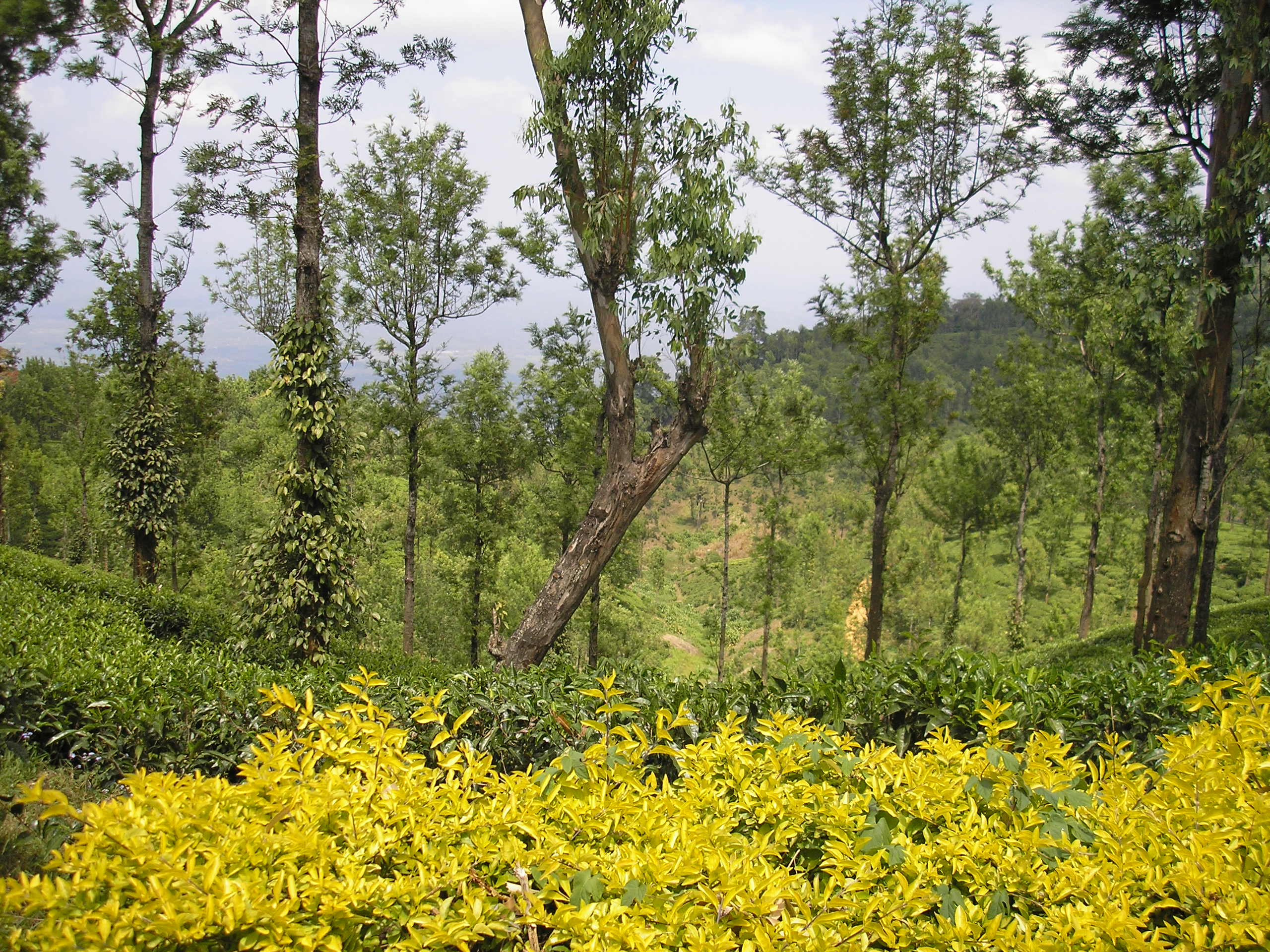
Hill view

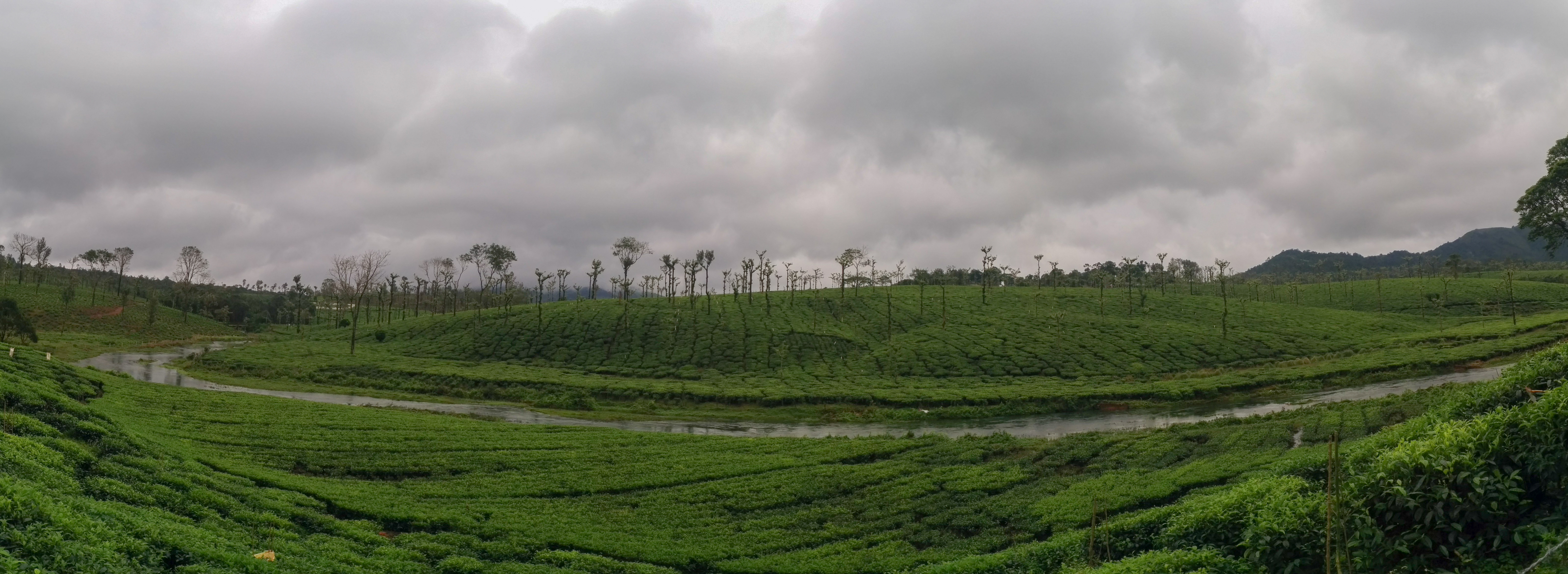

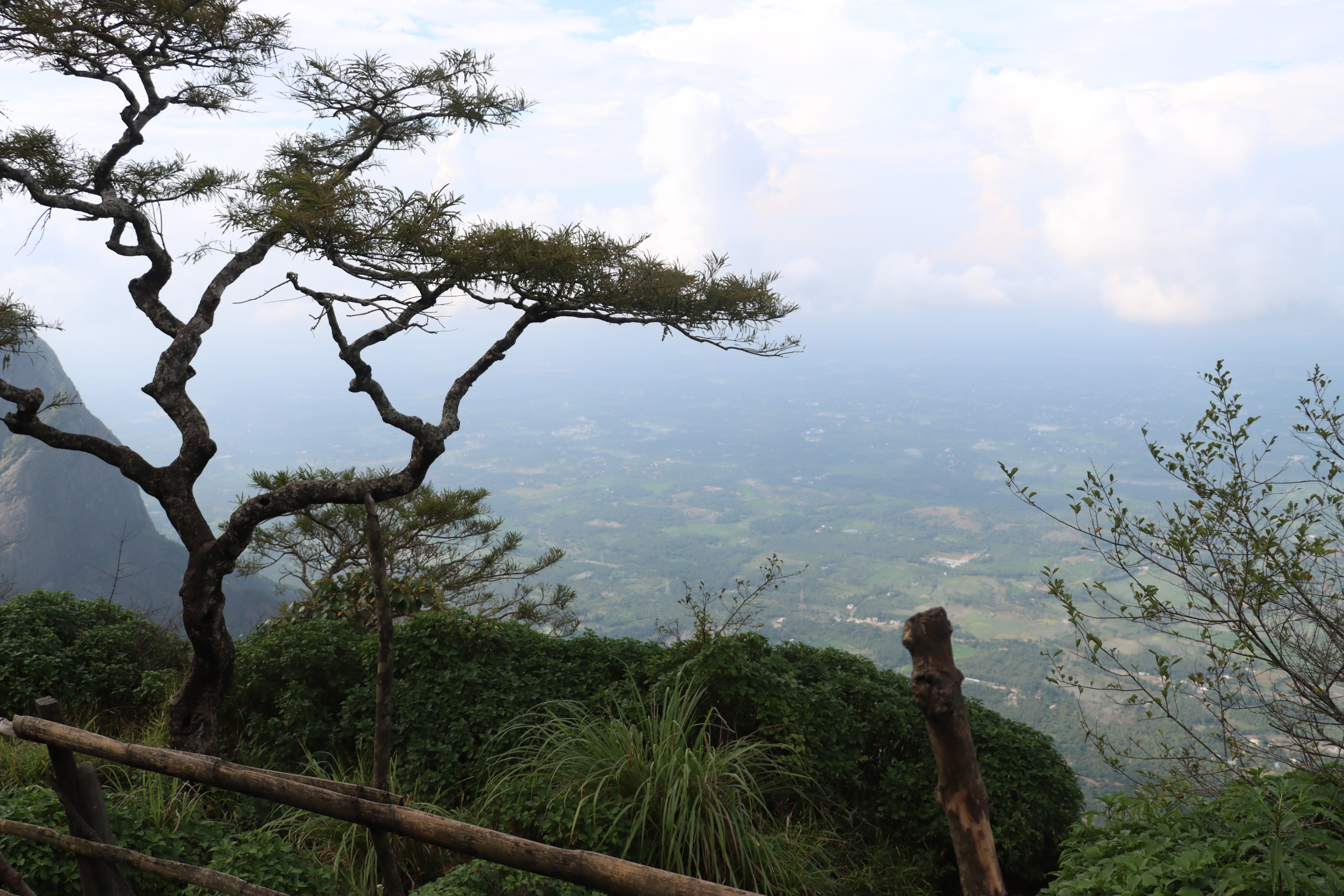
Another view of Sitharkundu viewpoint

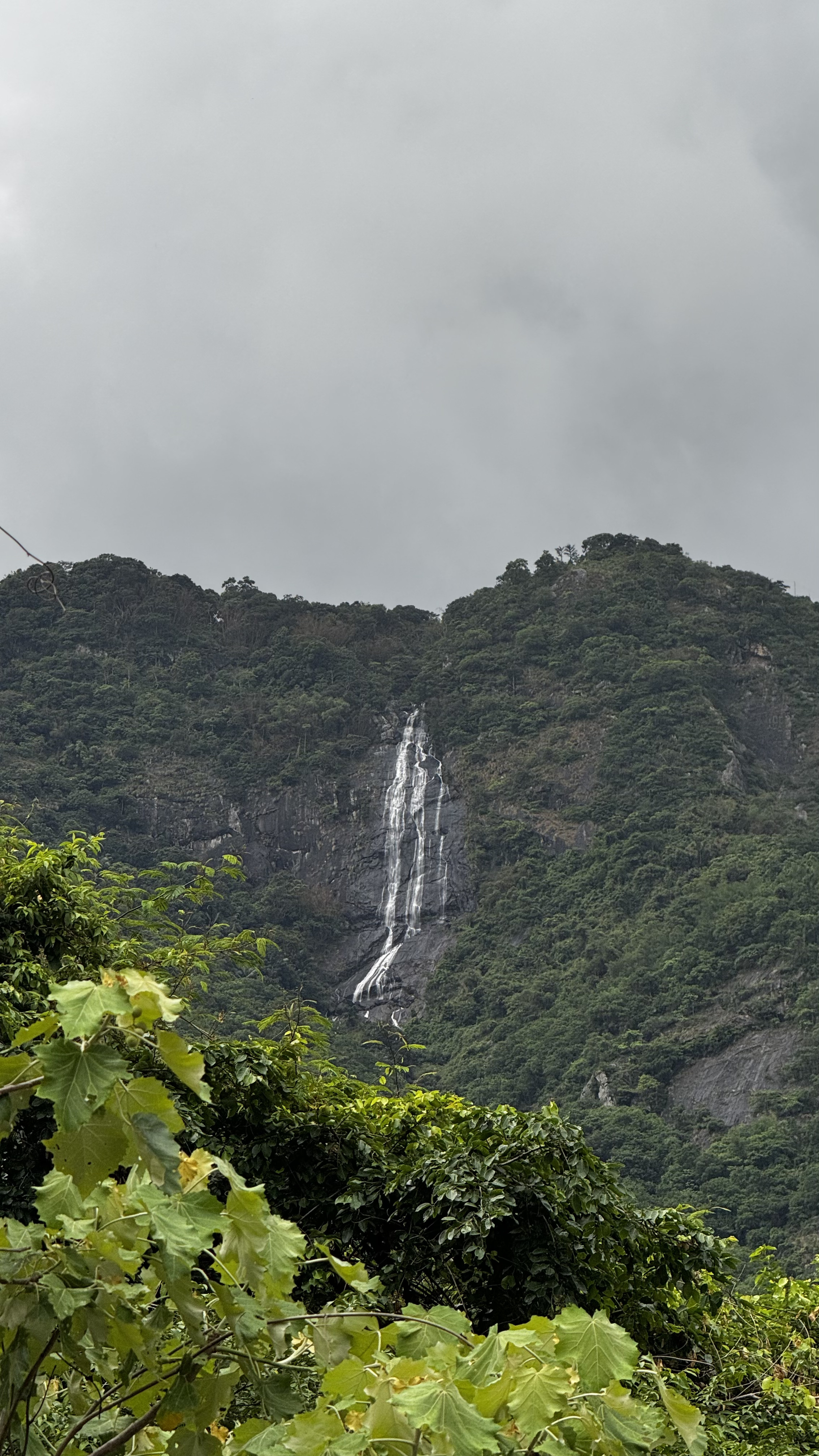

== See also ==
- Pothundi Dam
