= Pokkunny Siva Temple =

Hindu temple in Kerala, India

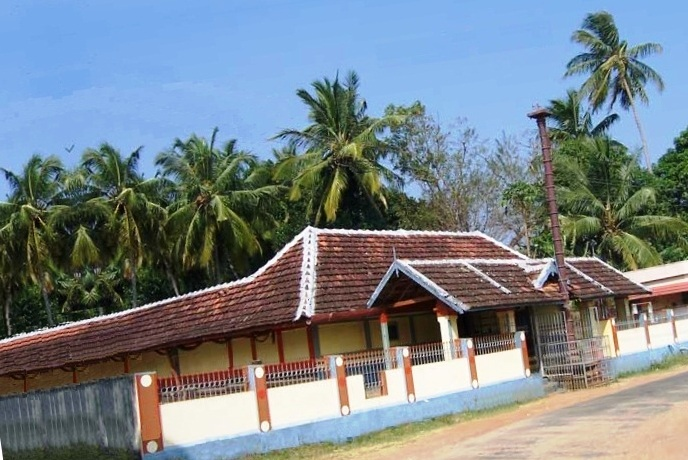
- Main Temple Structure

- Siva Temple, Pokkunny, Palakkad, Kerala

Religion
- Affiliation: Hinduism
- District: Palakkad
- Deity: Shiva
- Festival: Maha Shivaratri

Location
- Location: Vadavannur, Pokkunny
- State: Kerala
- Country: India
- Interactive map of Pokkunny Siva Temple
- Coordinates: 10.648614°N 76.703016°E

Architecture
- Type: Kerala style
- Creator: Kollankodu

Specifications
- Temple: One
- Monument: 1
- Elevation: 132.47 m (435 ft)

Pokkunny Siva Temple (Malayalam: പൊക്കുന്നി ശിവ ക്ഷേത്രം) is an ancient Hindu temple dedicated to Lord Shiva is situated at Vadavannur village of Alathur of Palakkad district in Kerala state in India. The temple is a part of 108 famous Shiva temples in Kerala. The temple is dedicated to Lord Shiva. Legend has it that Lord Parasurama installed the Shiva Linga at the pond (Perumkulam) in Alathur. The temple was built by the King of Kollamkodu kingdom.

== The legend ==
Lord Parashurama installed the idol of Siva in the pool as a way to diminish the harshness of the great deity and bring him peace. In other temples, the deity is worshiped facing to a pond or other pool to reduce the temper of Lord Shiva. Whatever the case, the temple is located in the vast pond. One side of the temple pond may have been erected to reach the temple which was formerly the temple pond. One can see the temple standing in the pond (Perumkulam Malayalam: പെരുംകുളം).

== History ==
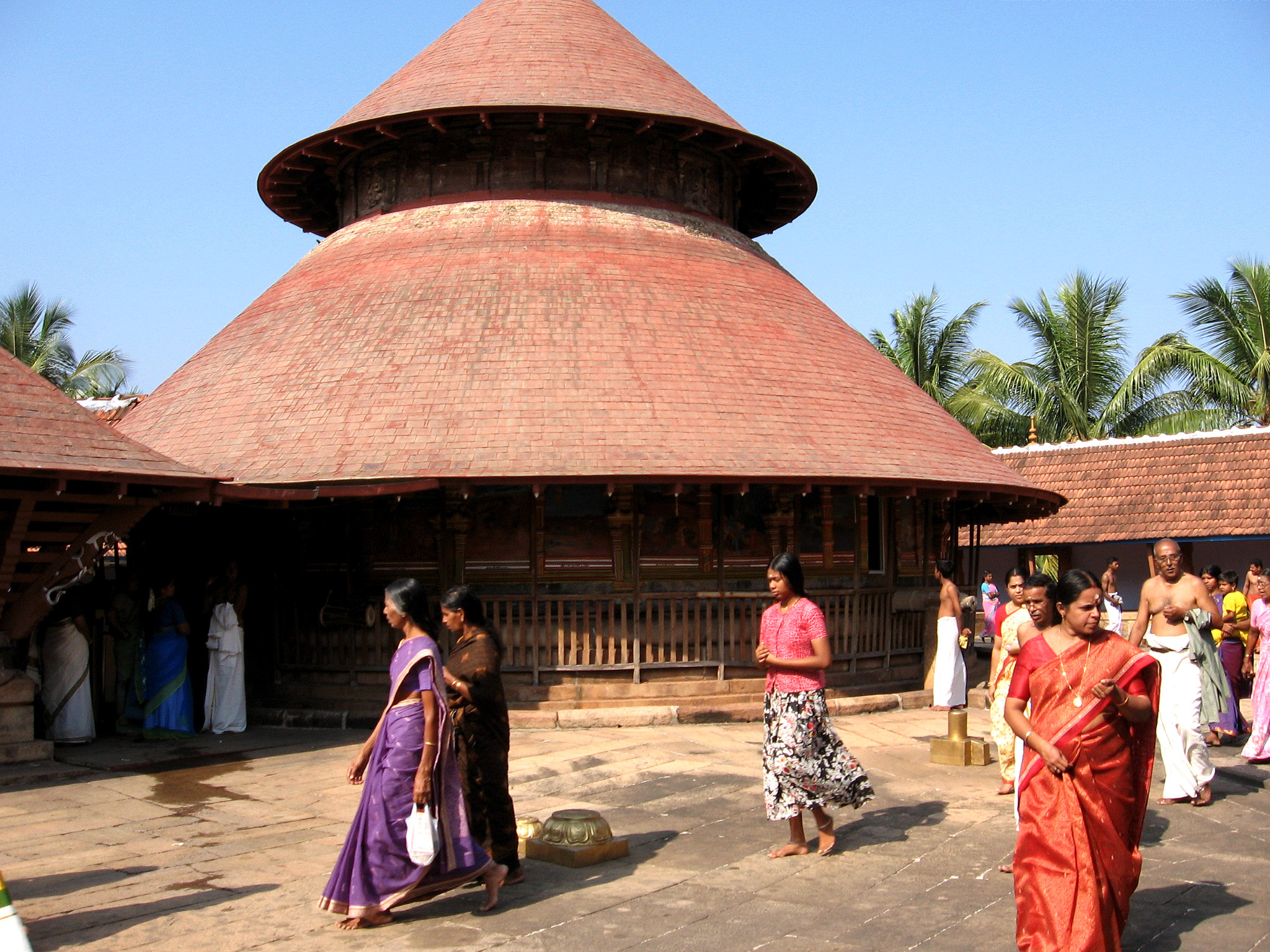
Kachakurissi Devi Temple

This temple was once owned by the king of Kollengode Palace. The old name of Kollengode was Venganad. Venganad Nambi or the king of Kollengode was the ruler of Venganad comprising the five lands. He was also the leader of over a thousand Nair families in the area. God of Kachamkurichi was the lord of the king of Kollengode but, Vadavannoor Thevar (Pokkunny Siva) was his favorite.
