= Kollengode =

Kollengode may refer to:

- Kollengode, Palakkad, a town in Palakkad district, Kerala, India
- Kollengode Palace, in Palakkad district
- Kollengode railway station, in Palakkad District
