= Nenmara Assembly constituency =

Constituency of the Kerala legislative assembly in India

Nenmara
- Constituency No. 59 for the Kerala Legislative Assembly
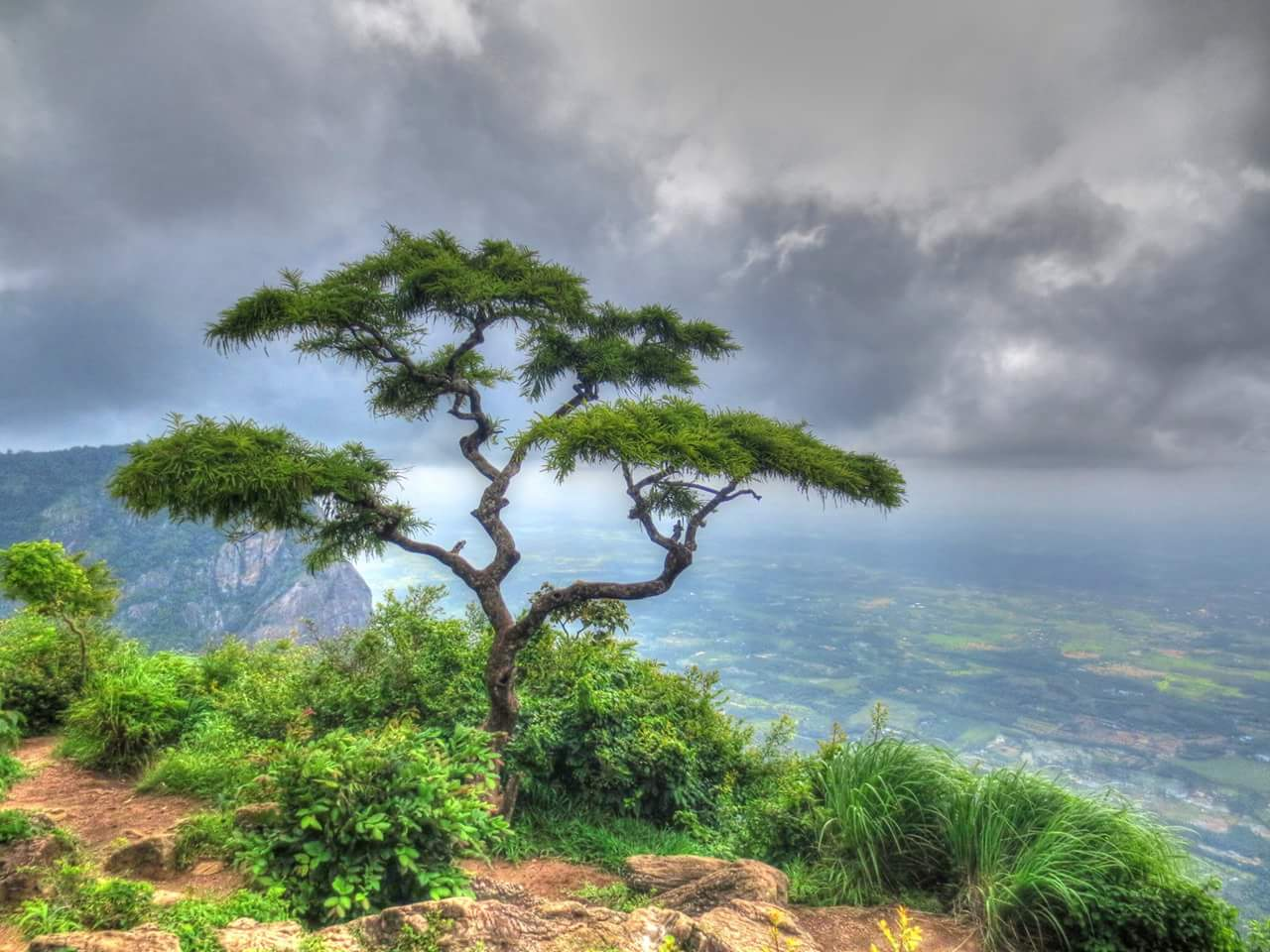
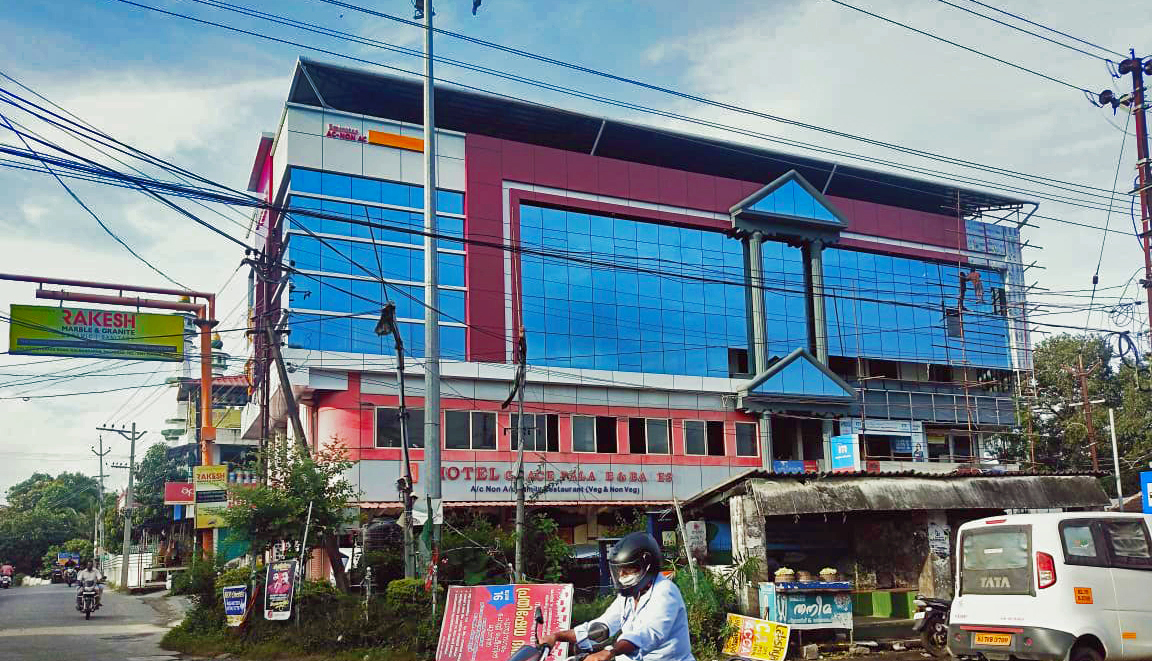
- Top to bottom: Sitharkundu viewpoint at Nelliampathi, Puthunagaram Town

Constituency details
- Country: India
- Region: South India
- State: Kerala
- District: Palakkad
- Lok Sabha constituency: Alathur
- Established: 2008
- Total electors: 1,92,592 (2021)
- Reservation: None

Member of Legislative Assembly
- 16th Kerala Legislative Assembly
- Incumbent K. Preman
- Party: CPI(M)
- Alliance: LDF
- Elected year: 2026

Nenmara State assembly constituency is one of the 140 state legislative assembly constituencies in Kerala in southern India. It is also one of the seven state legislative assembly constituencies included in Alathur Lok Sabha constituency. As of the 2026 Kerala Legislative Assembly election, the current MLA is K. Preman of CPI(M).

== Local self-governed segments ==
Nenmara Assembly constituency is composed of the following local self-governed segments:

Sl no.	Name	Status (grama panchayat/municipality)	Taluk
1	Elavanchery	Grama panchayat	Chittur
2	Koduvayur	Grama panchayat	Chittur
3	Kollengode	Grama panchayat	Chittur
4	Muthalamada	Grama panchayat	Chittur
5	Nelliampathi	Grama panchayat	Chittur
6	Nenmara	Grama panchayat	Chittur
7	Pallassana	Grama panchayat	Chittur
8	Ayiloor	Grama panchayat	Chittur
9	Puthunagaram	Grama panchayat	Chittur
10	Vadavannur	Grama panchayat	Chittur

== Members of Legislative Assembly ==
The following list contains all members of Kerala Legislative Assembly who have represented Nenmara Assembly constituency during the period of various assemblies:

Election	Niyama Sabha	Name	Party	Tenure
2011	13th	V. Chenthamarakshan	Communist Party of India	2011 – 2016
2016	14th	K. Babu	Communist Party of India	2016 –2021
2021	15th	K. Babu	Communist Party of India	2021 - 2026
2026	16th	K. Preman	Communist Party of India	Incumbent

== Election results ==
Percentage change (±%) denotes the change in the number of votes from the immediate previous election.

=== 2026 ===
2026 Kerala Legislative Assembly election: Nenmara
Party	Candidate	Votes	%	±%
CPI(M)	K. Preman	66,521	44.20	▼8.69
INC	A. Thankappan	63,216	42.00	▲8.05
BDJS	A. N. Anurag	18,107	12.03	▲1.03
SDPI	Anvar Sadik	793	0.53	
Independent	Sankaranarayanan R.	330	0.22	
Independent	Radhakrishnan K.	289	0.19	
NOTA	None of the above	1,241	0.82	
Margin of victory		2,305	2.20	▼16.74
Turnout		1,50,497		
CPI(M) hold		Swing	▼8.69	

=== 2021 ===
2021 Kerala Legislative Assembly election: Nenmara
Party	Candidate	Votes	%	±%
CPI(M)	K. Babu	80,145	52.89%	▲9.99%
CMP	C.N.Vijayakrishnan	51,441	33.95%	−
BDJS	A. N. Anurag	16,666	11.00%	−
BSP	Prakash.C	1,350	0.89%	−
Independent	Babu S/o Kunchu	863	0.57%	−
Margin of victory		28,704	18.94%	▲14.15%
Turnout		1,51,535		
CPI(M) hold		Swing	▲9.99%	

=== 2016 ===
There were 1,90,765 registered voters in Nenmara Constituency for the 2016 Kerala Assembly election.

2016 Kerala Legislative Assembly election: Nenmara
Party	Candidate	Votes	%	±%
CPI(M)	K. Babu	66,316	42.90%	▼4.96
INC	A. V. Gopinathan	58,908	38.11%	−
BJP	N. Sivarajan	23,096	14.94%	▲8.14
AIADMK	Menaka K.	2,186	1.41%	▲0.76
WPOI	Ajith Kumar	772	0.50%	−
SDPI	Sakkir Hussain S.	487	0.32%	▼1.03
Independent	Mohandasan	461	0.30%	−
Independent	Babu Chathan	324	0.21%	−
Independent	Babu Kumaran	239	0.15%	−
Independent	Babu Thathakutty	233	0.15%	−
Independent	Babu Vasu	204	0.13%	−
SS	M. Vinod	168	0.11%	−
Independent	M. B. Gopinathan	131	0.08%	−
NOTA	None of the above	1,053	0.68%	−
Margin of victory		7,408	4.79%	▼1.69%
Turnout		1,54,578	81.03%	▲3.11%
CPI(M) hold		Swing	▼4.96%	

=== 2011 ===
There were 1,72,069 registered voters in the constituency for the 2011 election.

2011 Kerala Legislative Assembly election: Nenmara
Party	Candidate	Votes	%	±%
CPI(M)	V. Chenthamarakshan	64,169	47.86%	
CMP	M. V. Raghavan	55,475	41.38%	
BJP	N. Sivarajan	9,123	6.80%	
SDPI	Sakeer Hussain	1,809	1.41%	
BSP	Chandran	1,484	1.11%	
AIADMK	Sugunan S.	1,279	0.95%	
CPI(ML)L	Joy Peter T.	735	0.55%	
Margin of victory		8,694	6.48%	
Turnout		1,34,074	77.92%	
CPI(M) win (new seat)				

== See also ==
- Nenmara
- Palakkad district
- List of constituencies of the Kerala Legislative Assembly
- 2016 Kerala Legislative Assembly election
