= K. Babu (CPI-M politician) =

Indian politician

K. Babu MLA
- കെ .ബാബു
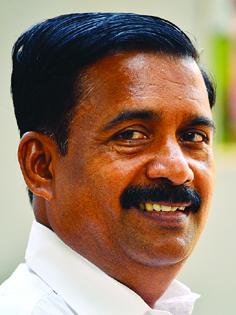

Member of the Kerala Legislative Assembly
- In office 2 June 2016 – 2026
- Preceded by: V. Chenthamarakshan
- Succeeded by: K. Preman
- Constituency: Nenmara

Personal details
- Born: Nemmara
- Party: Communist Party of India (Marxist)
- Spouse: Rosha
- Children: Adithyan
- Education: Bachelor of Arts

K. Babu (Malayalam: കെ ബാബു) is an Indian politician and a member of 14th Kerala Legislative Assembly representing Nenmara constituency. He is a member of the Communist Party of India (Marxist).

== Political career ==
Babu started his political life as a member of SFI. He was a leader of DYFI.

He was the President of Nenmara Block Panchayath from 1995 to 2000. He was the member of Palakkad District Panchayath representing Nenmara Division, from 2000 to 2005. He was the President of Nenmara Grama Panchayat from 2005 to 2010.

Babu is the Secretary of Palakkad District Committee of Auto Taxi Workers' Union (CITU). He is a member of Palakkad District Committee of Communist Party of India (Marxist). He was the secretary of Nemmara Local Committee of Communist Party of India (Marxist). He was the secretary of Kollengode Area Committee of Communist Party of India (Marxist).

He was elected to Kerala Legislative Assembly in 2016.

== See also ==
- Kerala Legislature
- V. Chenthamarakshan
- K. D. Prasenan
- K. Krishnankutty
- A. K. Balan
- P. Unni
- P. K. Sasi
- K. V. Vijayadas
- Muhammed Muhsin
- P. K. Biju
- U. R. Pradeep
