= Oottara =

- village
- Location in Kerala, India Oottara (India)
- Coordinates: 10°37′35″N 76°41′45″E
- Country: India
- State: Kerala
- District: Palakkad

Languages
  - Official: Malayalam, English
- Time zone: UTC+5:30 (IST)
- Vehicle registration: KL-70
- Coastline: 0 kilometres (0 mi)
- Climate: Tropical monsoon (Köppen)
- Avg. summer temperature: 38 °C (100 °F)
- Avg. winter temperature: 18 °C (64 °F)

Oottara is a small locality in Vadavannur Panchayat near Kollengode Town in Palakkad District of Kerala State in India. The Kollengode Railway station is located at Oottara. It is situated on the Kollengode Palakkad route. It lies on Palakkad-Kollengode road and connecting point for road to Malayampallam, Muthalamada and onward to Pollachi.

== Transport ==
The new broad gauge railway line from Palakkad to Rameswaram passes through Oottara, helping the commuters in this region to access Pollachi, Pazhani Murugan Temple, Palakkad Town, Udumalpet, Dindugal, Madurai and Rameswaram. There is a bridge over the river that carries the railway.

== Religion ==
There is a template to Lord Shiva, the Oottara Chidambaranatha Temple.
