= Onathallu =

Martial dance performed in Kerala as part of Onam festival

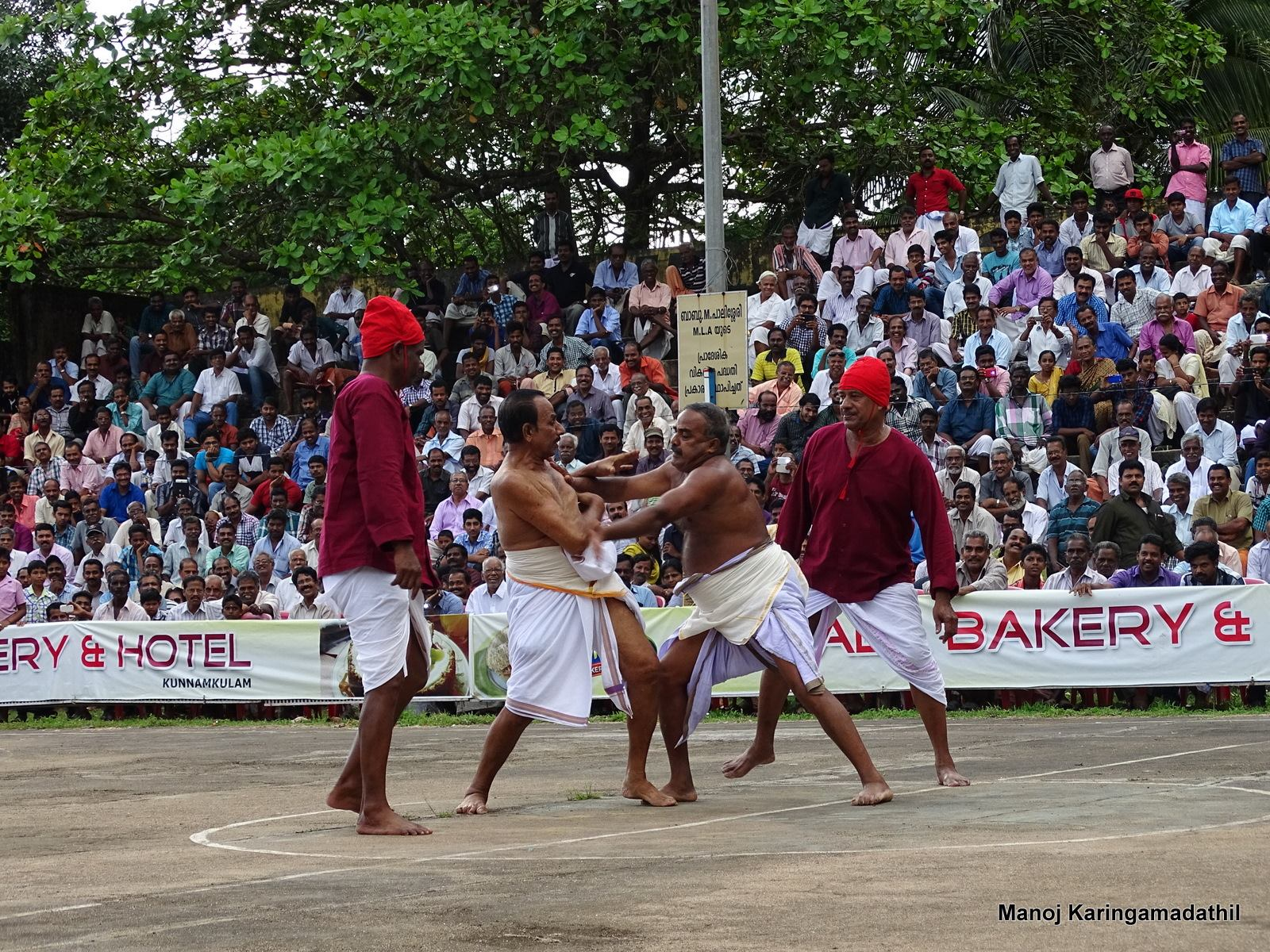
- Onathallu 2014 from Kunnamkulam, Thrissur
- Also known as: Kayyamkali, Avittathallu
- Focus: Palm striking, blocking with elbow
- Hardness: Semi-contact
- Country of origin: India
- Olympic sport: No
- Meaning: "Onam beating"

Onathallu, also known as Kayyāmkali or Avittathallu, is an Indian martial dance and a semi-contact combat sport performed in Kerala during the festival of Onam. In some places, it takes the form of non-stop fighting, while in some other places, it is a combat sport with actual fight.

== History ==
It is believed to have descended from the martial art Kalaripayattu. It is said to have evolved in Pallassena, a hamlet in present-day Palakkad district. According to legend, it is performed in memory of a battle waged by villagers of Pallassena against chieftain Kuthiravattathu Nair for killing their chieftain Pallasena Kuroor Nampidi by treachery. Both the chieftains were the subservient of the Zamorin of Calicut (Kozhikode Samoothiri). The battle ended after Samoothiri's intervention.

The festival is a tradition followed by the Nairs of the region in commemoration of the numerous wars they led and fought as part of the army of the Kolathiris. The name Pallassana refers to the fact that the group historically constituted the Pallava Sena or the Pallava Army, which eventually morphed into Pallassana or Pallasena, as it is known today.

== Fighting ==
In the game, it is played in two teams inside a circle of 14 metre diameter drawn in ground, known as Attakalam. Each opponent enters the Attakalam and challenges someone from the other team. Stepping outside the circle while fighting is counted as loss.

The tradition involves an enactment or warlike performances by men of the Nair community at the Vettakaruman Dewaswom temple premises. The key component of the performance involves men pairing up and, under the guidance and supervision of elders in the community, enacting physical combat, war cries and battle-like behaviour. This is seen as a vazhivaadu by the men involved, and is a highly revered and attended festival during the Avittam nakshatra of Onam.

In certain places, actual sparring takes place, with the left elbow serving as a shield and the right arm as a weapon. Spectators have a major part in arousing the martial spirit of the competitors. This duel exists in Kunnamkulam in Thrissur district and Malappuram and some other parts of northern Kerala. It is played by adults with a background on Kalaripayattu, who forms two teams consisting ten to twenty people. Two from each team walk ahead and spar until one is overpowered. This is performed until the last pair.
