= Meenkulathi Temple =

Hindu temple in Kerala, India

- Meenkulathi Temple, Pallassana, Palakkad, Kerala

Religion
- Affiliation: Hinduism
- District: Palakkad
- Deity: Meenakshi
- Festival: Maasi festival

Location
- Location: Pallassana
- State: Kerala
- Country: India
- Coordinates: 10.635466°N 76.655556°E

Architecture
- Type: Dravidian architecture

Specifications
- Temple: One
- Elevation: 116.56 m (382 ft)

The Meenkulathi Temple is located in Pallassena, a village in southern India.

== Origins ==
Meenkulathikkavu is the oldest temple in Pallasena. Tradition has it that centuries ago three families belonging to the Veerasaiva Mannadiar clan worshipped the goddess Meenakshi as their deity. An acute drought in Chidambaram (Tamil Nadu) drove them to seek greener pastures. One of them took a stone from there along with their other possessions. Worshipping their stone as their friend, philosopher and guide, they trekked to several places before reaching Pallasena. Enchanted by the forests surrounding the villages they settled there and prospered in the diamond trade. Whenever they went on business, they offered their customary prayers to the family deity. An aged member of their clan went for his customary bath before leaving on a trip home. He left his valuables and a palm leaf umbrella in the care of two youths. When he came back, he was shocked when he could not lift the things he had left with the youths. An astrologer said that Meenakshi had manifested herself under the umbrella and that was why it could not be moved. Huge crowds came there to witness the miracle. The place came to be known as Kudamannu.

The temple contains several idols and statues of fish, as the goddess is often connected with marine life.

Some Keralites also worship Meenkulathi Bhagavathi as their family deity.

The present Meenakshi Temple and the adjacent temple tank were constructed over the next four centuries. A Thirumandiram was written as a testimony to the event. The Mannadiar clan has grown into 110 manais (veedus). They conduct Navarathri, Pongal and Bhairava festivals.

== Buildings ==
The structure is built in the Tamilnadu style. It is constructed in such a way that the shadow of the wall never falls on the ground. There are two entrances, one in the north and the other in the west. The temple tank is next to the western entrance.

Crossing the Dwajasthambam made of teakwood and covered with copper. The garbhagriha contains a large idol of Meenakshi Amman. Devotees are not allowed to wander around the garbhagriha. Around the main idol, the saptha maathas (several female deities - Brahmi, Maheswari, Kaumari, Vaishnavai, Indrani, Chamundi and Varahi) are installed. There are separate shrines for Ganapathi, Veerabhadra, Durga, Shiva, Bhairava, Brahma Rakshasas and Ayyappa. In the adjacent hill called Vamala there are shrines for Muruga, Ganapathi, Siva, and Shasta.

== Events ==
Navarathri, Karthigai, Mandala Vilakku, Maasi Thiruvizha, Pallivettai and Bhairava Pooja are the most celebrated events in the temple. The eight-day Maasi festival includes Ottamthullal and Kathakali programs depicting scenes from the Ramayana and Mahabharata. It is customary that the deity's sword and lamp are taken in procession by the descendants of the youths who stood guard over the valuables and the palm leaf umbrella.

Though the Mannadiar clan is given a privileged place in the activities of the temple, members of the entire community participate in the conduct of the temple festivals. The unique structure of the temple and its mode of worship have gained immense popularity among the natives of the village. Devotees firmly believe that the bath in the tank (known for its abundant fish) rids one of all chronic ailments.

== See also ==
- Temples of Kerala
