= Koduvayur =

- Census town
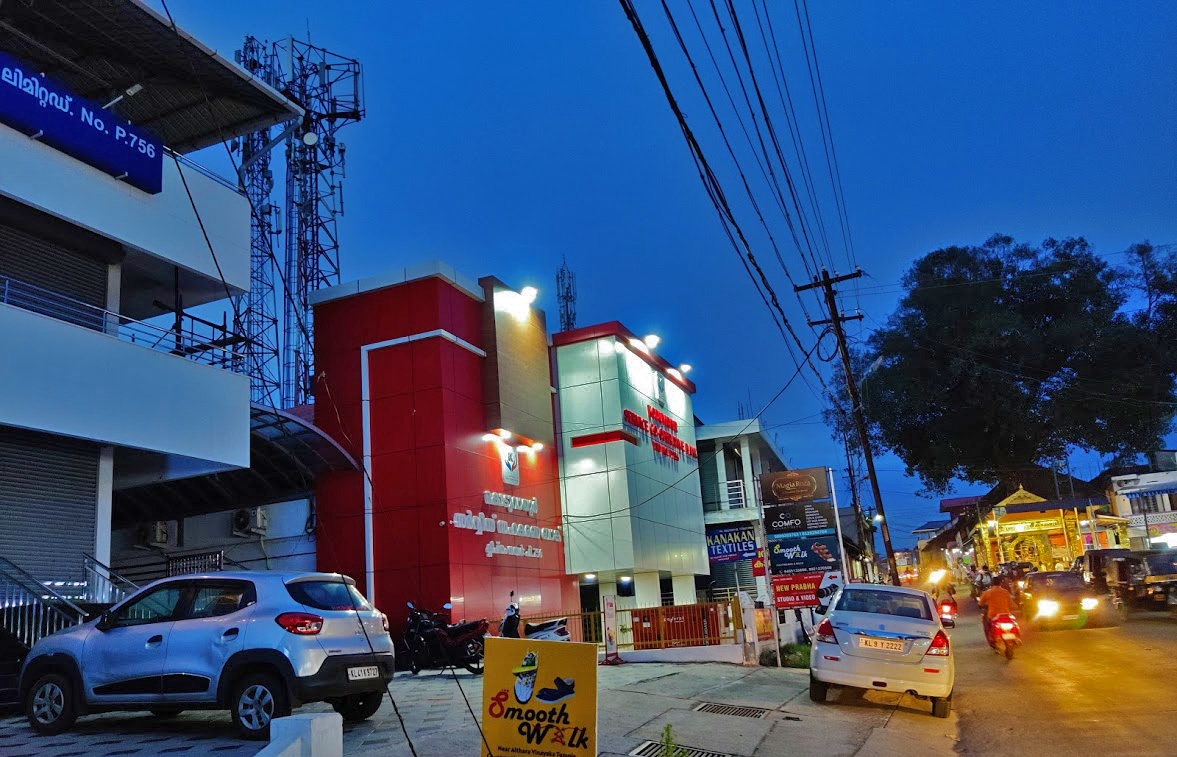
- Koduvayur Main Road

- Location in Kerala, India Koduvayur (India)
- Coordinates: 10.6632°N 76.6470°E
- Country: India
- State: Kerala
- District: Palakkad

Government
  - Body: Koduvayur Grama Panchayat

Area
  - Total: 21.06 km^{2} (8.13 sq mi)

Population (2011)
  - Total: 29,197
  - Density: 1,386/km^{2} (3,591/sq mi)

Languages
  - Official: Malayalam, English
- Time zone: UTC+5:30 (IST)
- PIN: 678501
- Vehicle registration: KL-09, KL-70
- Nearest city: Palakkad
- Parliament constituency: Alathur
- Assembly constituency: Nenmara

Koduvayur is a Census Town and Grama Panchayat in Palakkad district in the state of Kerala, India. Koduvayur Panchayat comprises Koduvayur-I and Koduvayur-II villages. As of the 2011 Census of India, Koduvayur-I village had a population of 20,703 spread over an area of 11.47 km^{2} (4.43 sq mi). It is one of the major commercial centre in the district and is located about 11 km from Palakkad through State Highway 27. It is part of the decentralized administrative system in India, aimed at ensuring local development and governance in rural areas. Koduvayur serves as an important centre for governance and public administration at the village.

== Administration ==
Koduvayur Gram Panchayat operates under the framework of the Kerala Panchayati Raj Act, 1994. The panchayat is divided into several wards, with elected representatives (ward members) from each ward forming the governing council. A president, who is elected from among the ward members, heads the panchayat. This governing body is responsible for managing local infrastructure, public health, sanitation, education, and welfare programs.

The Gram Panchayat system is part of the three-tier Panchayati Raj structure in India, which also includes block panchayats and district panchayats. At the Koduvayur level, governance involves close interaction with the local community to identify and address development issues. Decision-making is participatory, with local residents having a voice in matters such as public works, resource allocation, and welfare schemes.

== Economy ==
Agriculture is the primary occupation in the Koduvayur region, with rice being the predominant crop. The village economy also relies on the cultivation of cash crops such as coconut, bananas, and areca nut. The panchayat works to support agricultural practices by providing infrastructure such as irrigation facilities and organising farmer education programs to promote sustainable agriculture.

In addition to agriculture, small-scale industries and local businesses also contribute to the economy. The panchayat has been working on promoting rural development schemes, such as the Mahatma Gandhi National Rural Employment Guarantee Scheme (MGNREGS), which provides employment opportunities to local residents and aids in poverty alleviation.

== Education and healthcare ==
Koduvayur Gram Panchayat is responsible for the management of public schools and healthcare centers in its jurisdiction. It works in coordination with state government schemes to improve educational outcomes and health services. Primary and secondary schools in the area serve the educational needs of children from nearby villages. The panchayat also runs initiatives aimed at promoting literacy among adults.

The healthcare infrastructure is centered around public health centers that provide basic medical services. Health initiatives include immunization drives, maternal care programs, and campaigns aimed at preventing vector-borne diseases such as malaria and dengue.

== Development projects ==
In recent years, Koduvayur Gram Panchayat has focused on infrastructure development, with projects aimed at improving roads, drainage systems, and sanitation facilities. Clean drinking water supply and waste management are key areas of concern, and the panchayat has worked with state and central government agencies to secure funds and implement projects to address these issues. The panchayat has also taken steps to promote renewable energy, encouraging the installation of solar power systems in public institutions and residences.

== Cultural and social activities ==
Koduvayur is home to several cultural events and festivals, many of which are centered around the temples in the area. Traditional arts such as Kathakali, Mohiniyattam, and folk music performances are part of the cultural fabric of the village. The panchayat plays an active role in promoting these cultural activities, supporting local artists, and organizing events that preserve the heritage of the region.

Additionally, the panchayat engages in social welfare programs, particularly in areas of women's empowerment and youth development. It works in collaboration with local non-governmental organizations (NGOs) and state agencies to implement initiatives aimed at skill development, entrepreneurship, and social equality.

== History ==
Along with the rest of the modern Palakkad district, Koduyavur lies in what was the Malabar District in British India. Koduvayur was one of the 18 asmams that composed the Cheranad division of the colonial era Ernad Taluk, directly ruled by the Zamorin of Calicut. Its inclusion in this district was documented in William Logan's Malabar Manual published in 1887.

== Geography ==
Koduvayur is located roughly 10 km south of Palakkad, which is known for its proximity to the Western Ghats and lush paddy fields, along SH 27. It is bordered to the west and northwest by Thenkurissi, to the east by Puthunagaram, to the northeast by Peruvemba, and to the south by Pallassanna. The Malampuzha main canal flows southward through Koduvayur from the Malampuzha Dam. The area experiences a tropical monsoon climate, with distinct wet and dry seasons that influence the agricultural cycle.

== Attractions ==
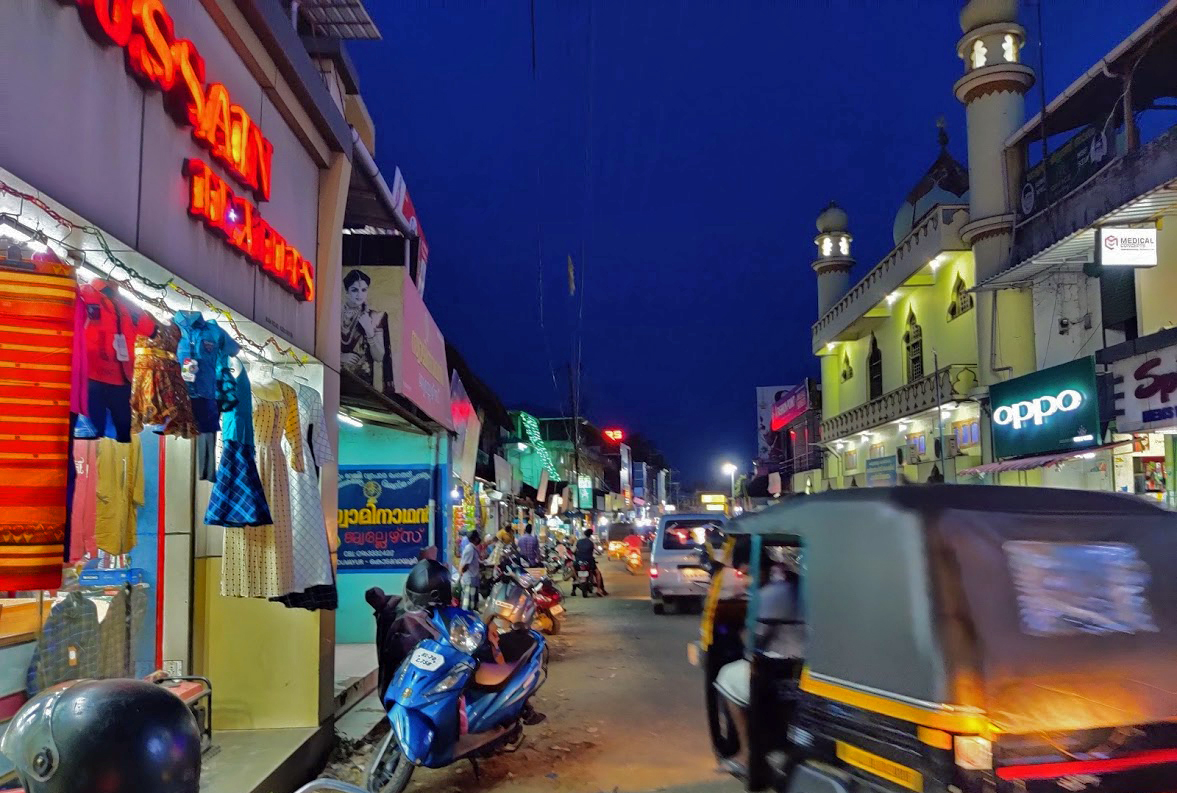
Koduvayur town night view

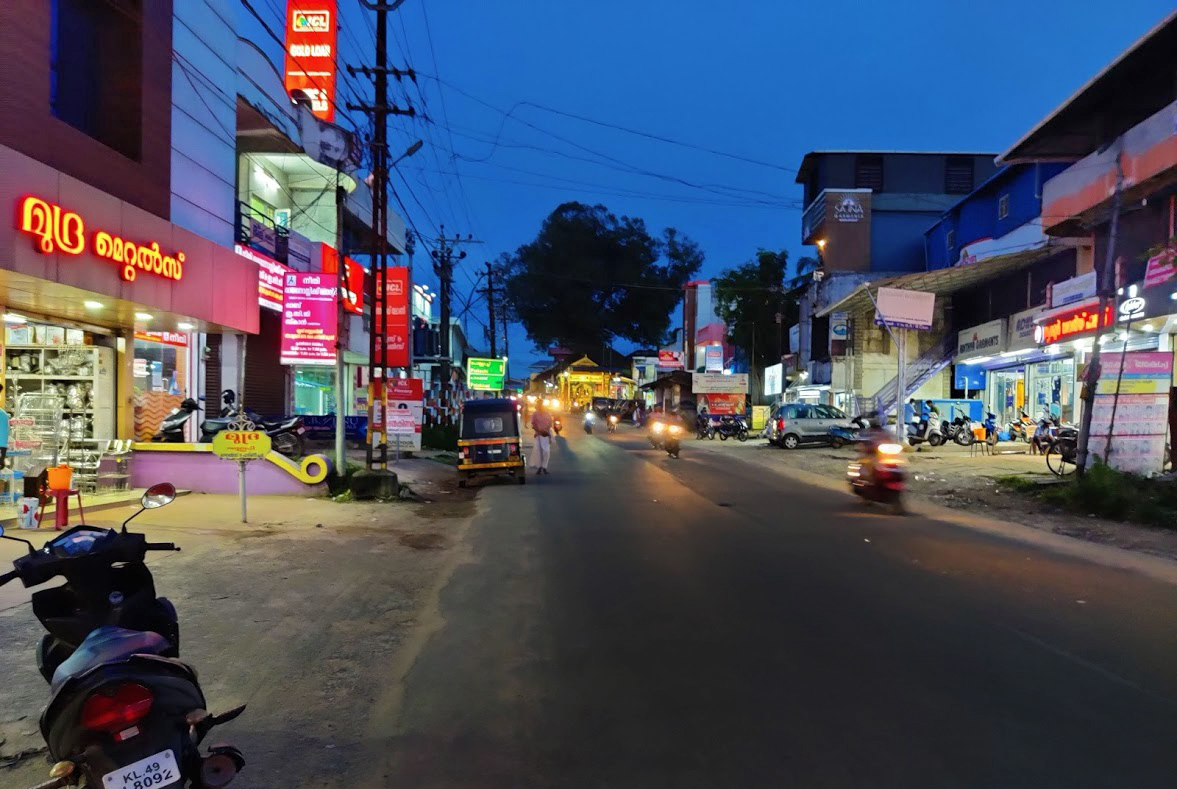
Koduvayur main road

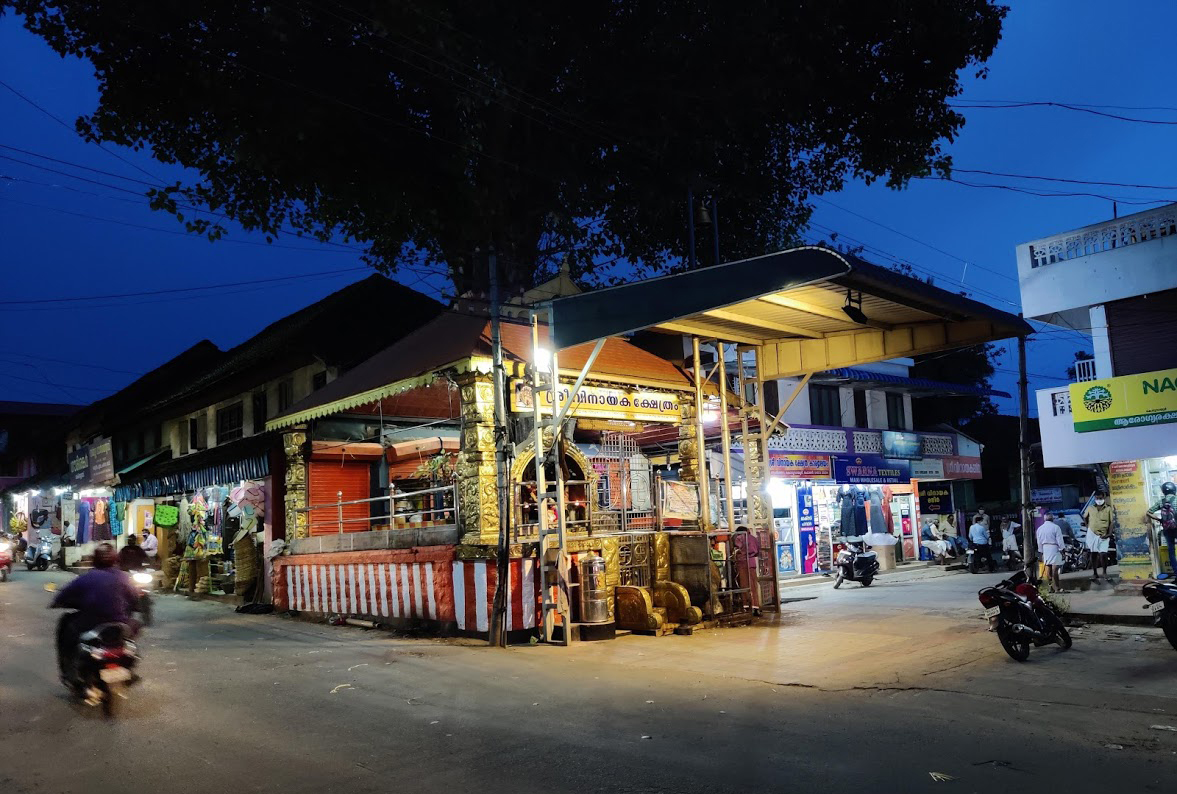
Sree Vinayaka Temple, Koduvayur

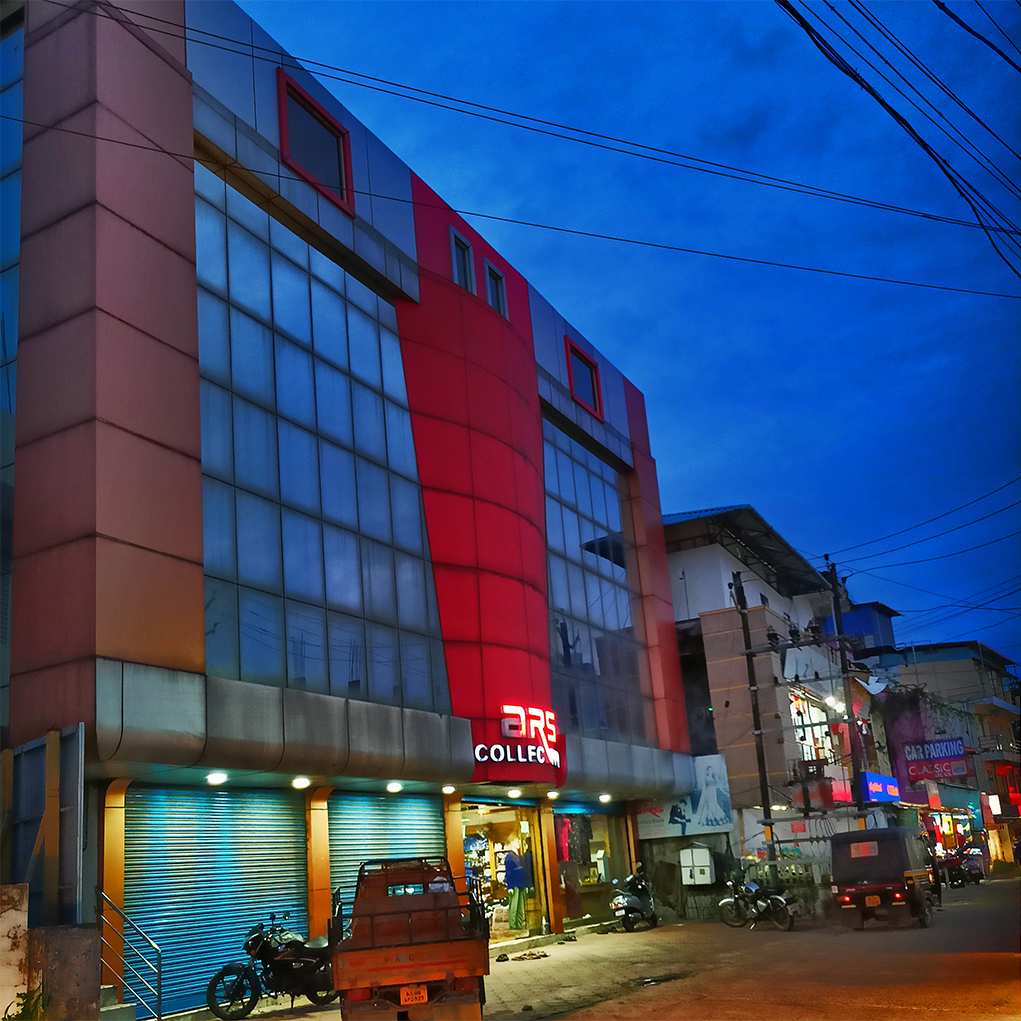
Textile shops in Koduvayur

Koduvayur is home to a temple dedicated to the Hindu deity Shiva. The temple is thought to have a 650-year-old history and played an important role in the initial settlement of Koduvaur. It is well known for its Rathousalvam or chariot festival, attracting patrons from across Pallakad and the state Kerala. After 18 days of preparation for the festival, three idols or utsava moorthis, process around the temple and 9 times around a holy bunyan tree. The procession is accompanied by celebrations, as well as fireworks as well as the Annadanam or sacred meal for devotees.

In the centre of Koduvayur on Koduvayur Thrippalur Road is an outdoor market featuring produce and textiles.
