= Oddanchatram railway station =

Railway station in Tamil Nadu, India

Oddanchatram ஒட்டன்சத்திரம்
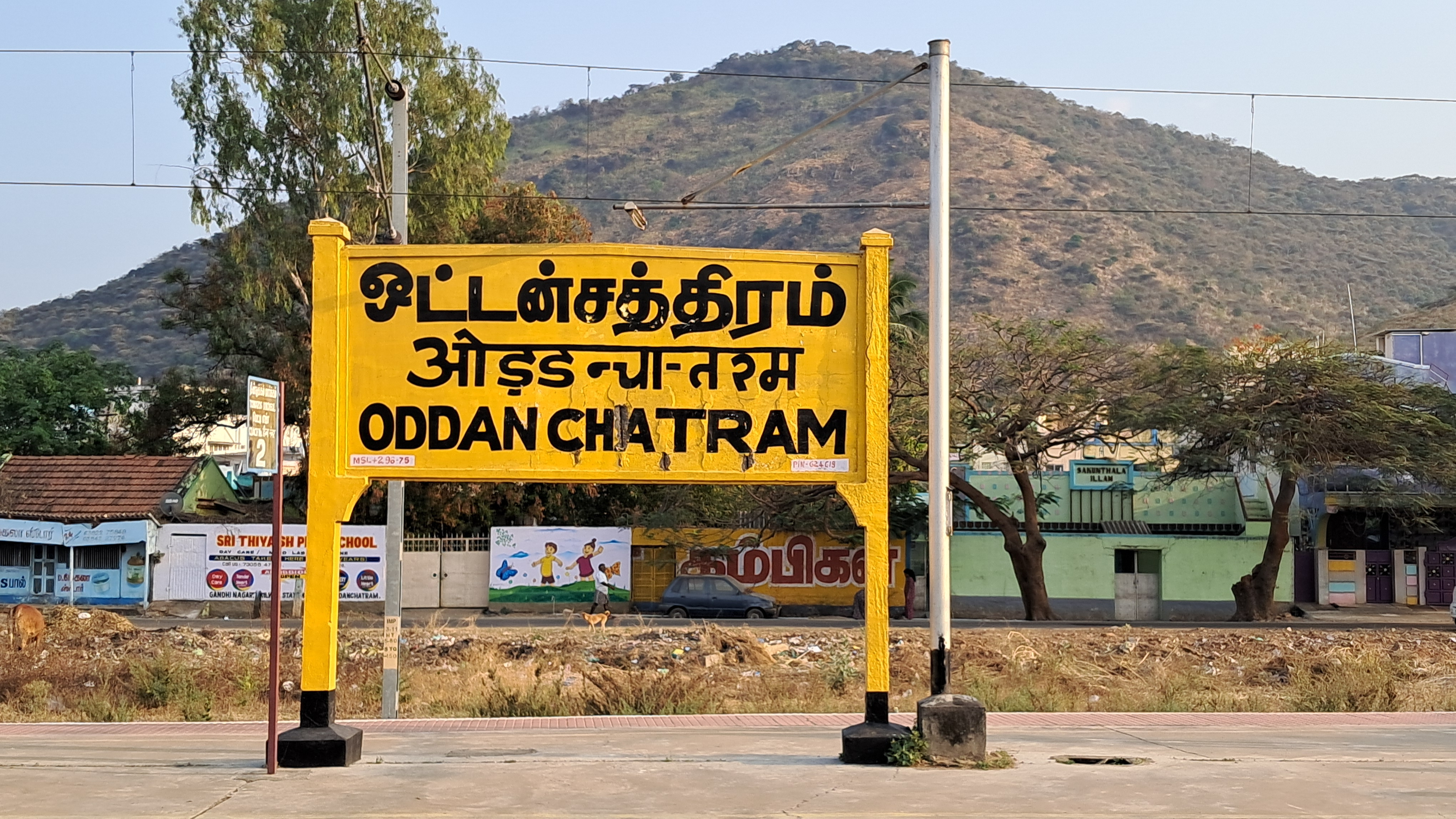

General information
- Location: Dindigul-Palani road, Oddanchatram, Dindigul district, Tamil Nadu PIN-624619; India
- Coordinates: 10°29′05.8″N 77°44′45.9″E
- Elevation: 300 metres (980 ft)
- System: Regional rail and Light rail Station
- Owner: Indian Railways
- Operator: Southern Railway
- Platforms: 3
- Tracks: 4

Other information
- Status: Functioning
- Station code: ODC
- Zone(s): Southern Railway zone
- Division(s): Madurai
Location

Oddanchatram railway station (station code: ODC) is an Indian railway station in Madurai railway division of Southern Railway zone. It serves the town of Oddanchatram, located in Dindigul district of the Indian state of Tamil Nadu.

== Electrification ==
On 13 September 2022, Palani – Dindigul Junction CRS inspection was conducted and soon this stretch consisting of these stations, Chattrapatti, Oddanchatram and Akkaraipatti will be converted from single-diesel Line to single-electric line, respectively.

== Performance and earnings ==
For the FY 2022–23, the annual earnings of the station was ₹22,134,316 (US$230,000) and daily earnings was ₹60,642 (US$630). For the same financial year, the annual passenger count was 117,255 and daily count was 321. While, the footfall per day was recorded as 614.
