= Mural Art Museum =

Museum in Kerala, India

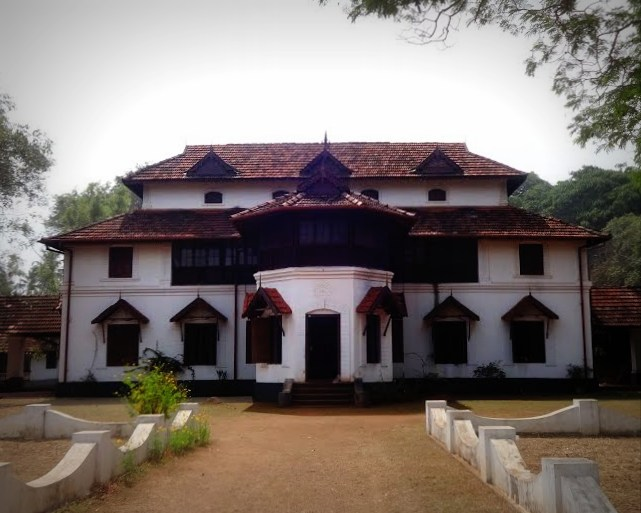
- Established: 2013
- Location: Thrissur city, Kerala
- Type: Murals

Mural Art Museum is the only museum dedicated to mural arts in Kerala. It is situated in Kollengode Palace in Thrissur, India. It was started as a part of Sree Mulam Chithrasala (Picture Gallery) in 1938. Afterwards it was an archaeological museum and in 2009 it was renovated and opened to the public. The museum houses a gallery of murals from all over Kerala and preserves a rare treasure of Veera kallu, temple models, manuscripts written on palm leaves, life-size statues of eminent personalities, a megalith collection consisting of earthen pots, Nannangadi (urn burials) black and red wares, black wares russet coated wares, stone age tools, excavated materials from Indus Valley Civilisation and Harappa and Cheraman Parambu, Kodungallur.
