= Pallassena =

Pallassana
- village
- Location in Kerala, India Pallassana (India)
- Coordinates: 10.636111°N 76.659722°E
- Country: India
- State: Kerala
- District: Palakkad

Government
  - Type: Pallasana Grama Panchayat

Area
  - Total: 29.37 km^{2} (11.34 sq mi)

Population (2011)
  - Total: 23,581
  - Density: 802.9/km^{2} (2,079/sq mi)

Languages
  - Official: Malayalam,
- Time zone: UTC+5:30 (IST)
- PIN: 678505
- Vehicle registration: KL-70

Pallassana is a village and gram panchayat in the Palakkad District, state of Kerala, India. It is close to Kollengode Town and Koduvayur and beside the river Gayatri, one of the tributaries of Bharatapuza. It is primarily notable for being the location of the Meenkulathi Temple. Pallassana is a known hub of artists of various folklore like Kanyarkali and Porattukali etc. Late Dwaraka Krishnan Kongassery Asaan and his contemporaries are remembered worldwide for their talented dedication to the art form. Pallassana is also famous for having percussion artists (Chenda). There are genius talents like Late Padmanabha Marar, Late Kalamandalam Chandra Mannadiar and many next generation artists.

== Demographics ==
As of 2001 India census, Pallassena had a population of 23,729 with 11,785 males and 11,944 females. Whereas SC population is 5,340.

== Onathallu Ritual ==
Onathallu or Avittathallu is a festival celebrated by the natives of Pallassana Desham in the Chittur Thaluk in Palakkad district, in the southernmost state of India, Kerala. The festival is a tradition followed by the natives of the region in commemoration of the numerous wars they led and fought as part of the army of the Kolathiris. The name Pallassana refers to the fact that the group historically constituted the Pallava Sena or the Pallava Army, which eventually morphed into Pallassana or Pallasena, as it is known today. The tradition involves an enactment or warlike performances by men of the Nair community at the Vettakaruman Devaswom temple premises. and OBC community perform in thallumannam. The key component of the performance involves men pairing up and, under the guidance and supervision of elders in the community, enacting physical combat, war cries and battle-like behaviour. This is seen as a vazhivaadu by the men involved, and is a highly revered and attended festival during the Avittam nakshatra of Onam in puthankavu and thiruvonam nakshatra of Onam in thallumannam.
