= Koduvayur-II =

Koduvayur-ll
- village
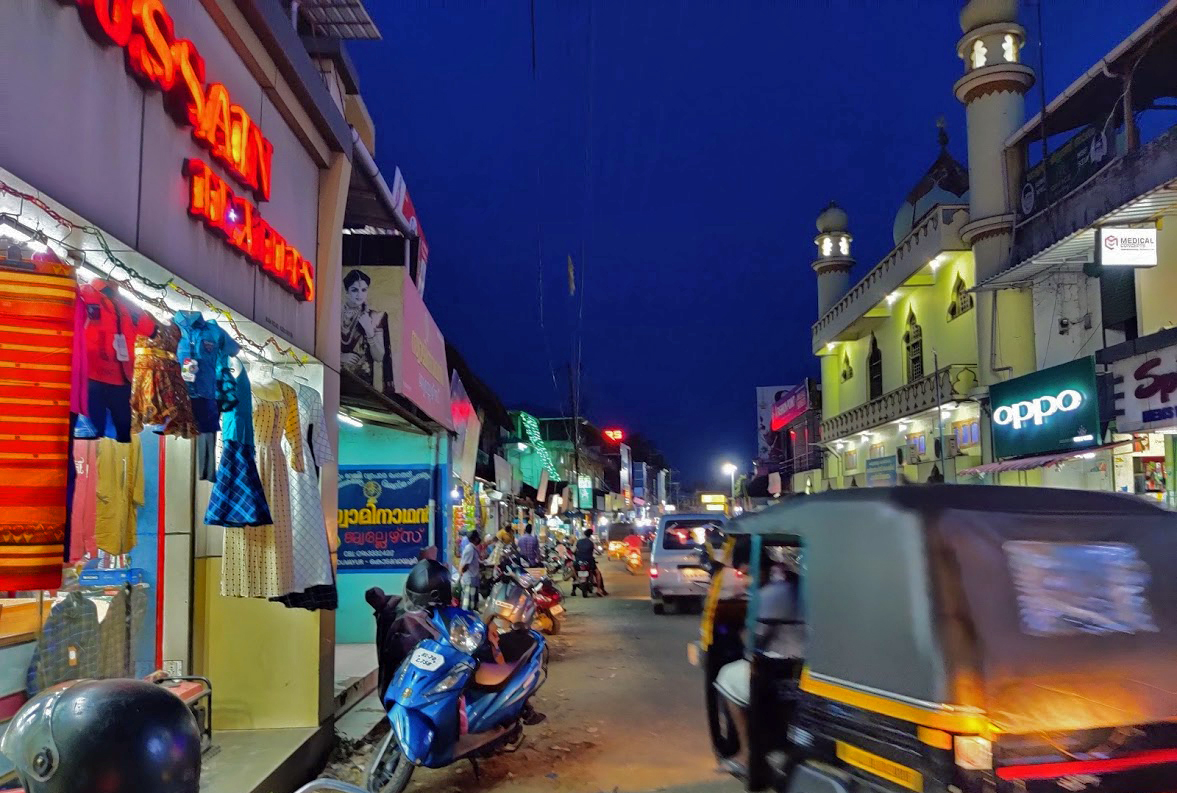
- Koduvayur night view
- Country: India
- State: Kerala
- District: Palakkad

Government
  - Body: Koduvayur Grama Panchayat

Area
  - Total: 10.26 km^{2} (3.96 sq mi)

Population (2011)
  - Total: 8,494
  - Density: 827.9/km^{2} (2,144/sq mi)

Languages
  - Official: Malayalam, English
- Time zone: UTC+5:30 (IST)
- PIN: 678501
- Vehicle registration: KL-09, KL-70

Koduvayur-II is a village in the Palakkad district, state of Kerala, India. It is administered by the Koduvayur gram panchayat.

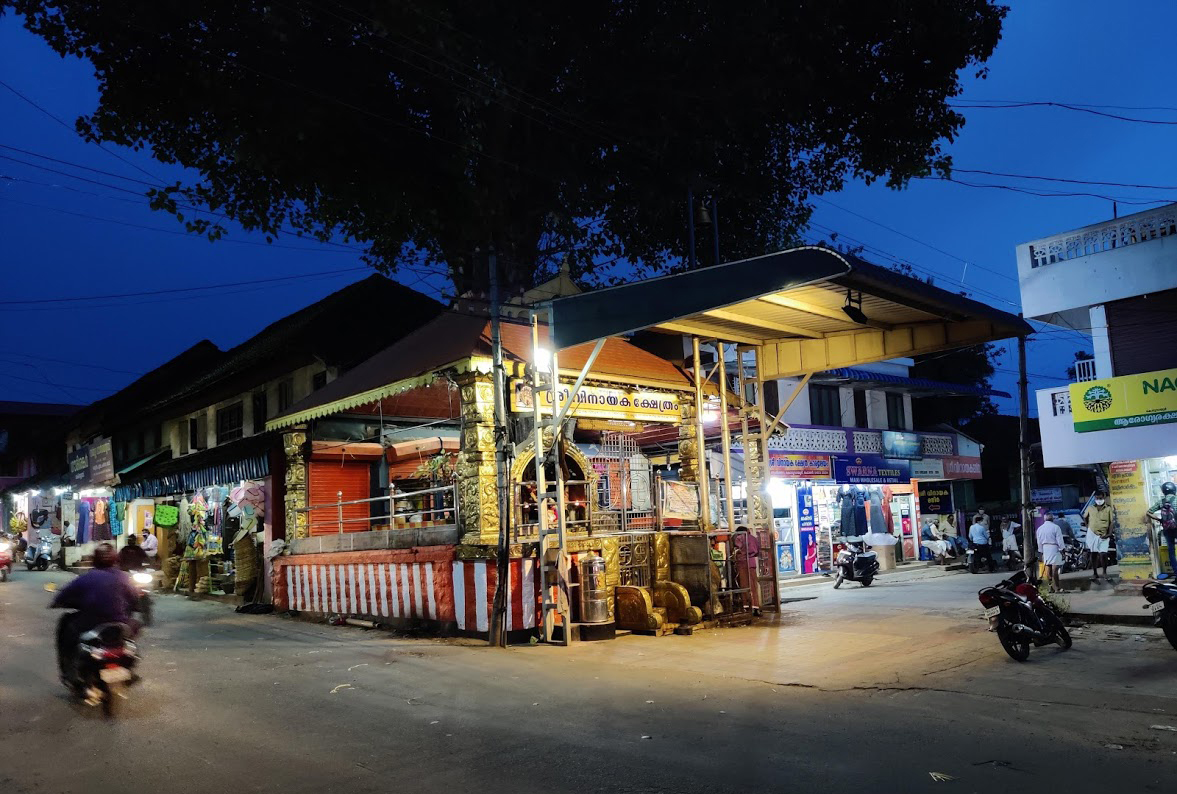
Sree Vinayaka Temple, Koduvayur

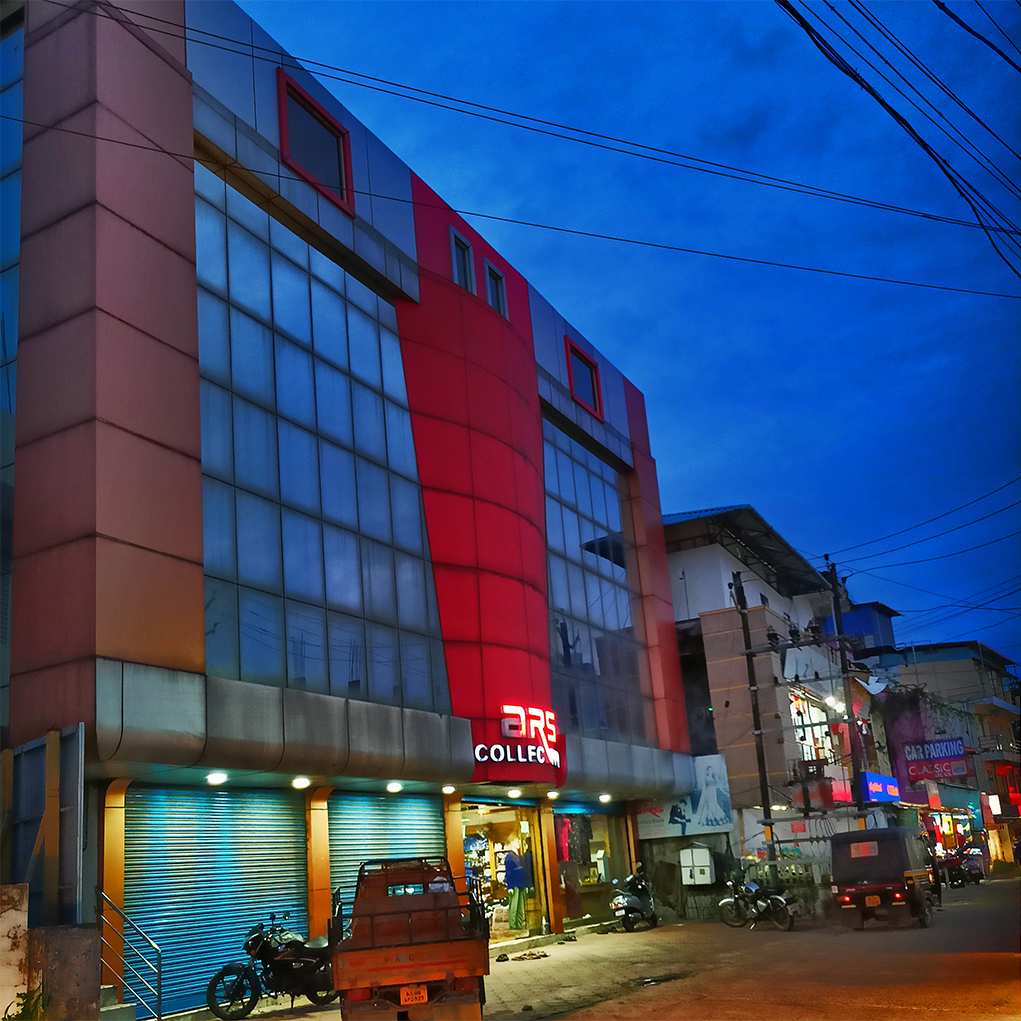
Textile shops in Koduvayur

== Demographics ==
As of 2011 India census, Koduvayur-II had a population of 8,494 with 4,167 males and 4,327 females.
