= K. Preman =

Indian politician

K. Preman is a politician from Kerala, India. He is a member of the Kerala Legislative Assembly. He represents Nenmara Assembly constituency in the 16th Kerala State Legislative Assembly. He belongs to the Communist Party of India (Marxist).
