= Kollengode Palace =

Building in India

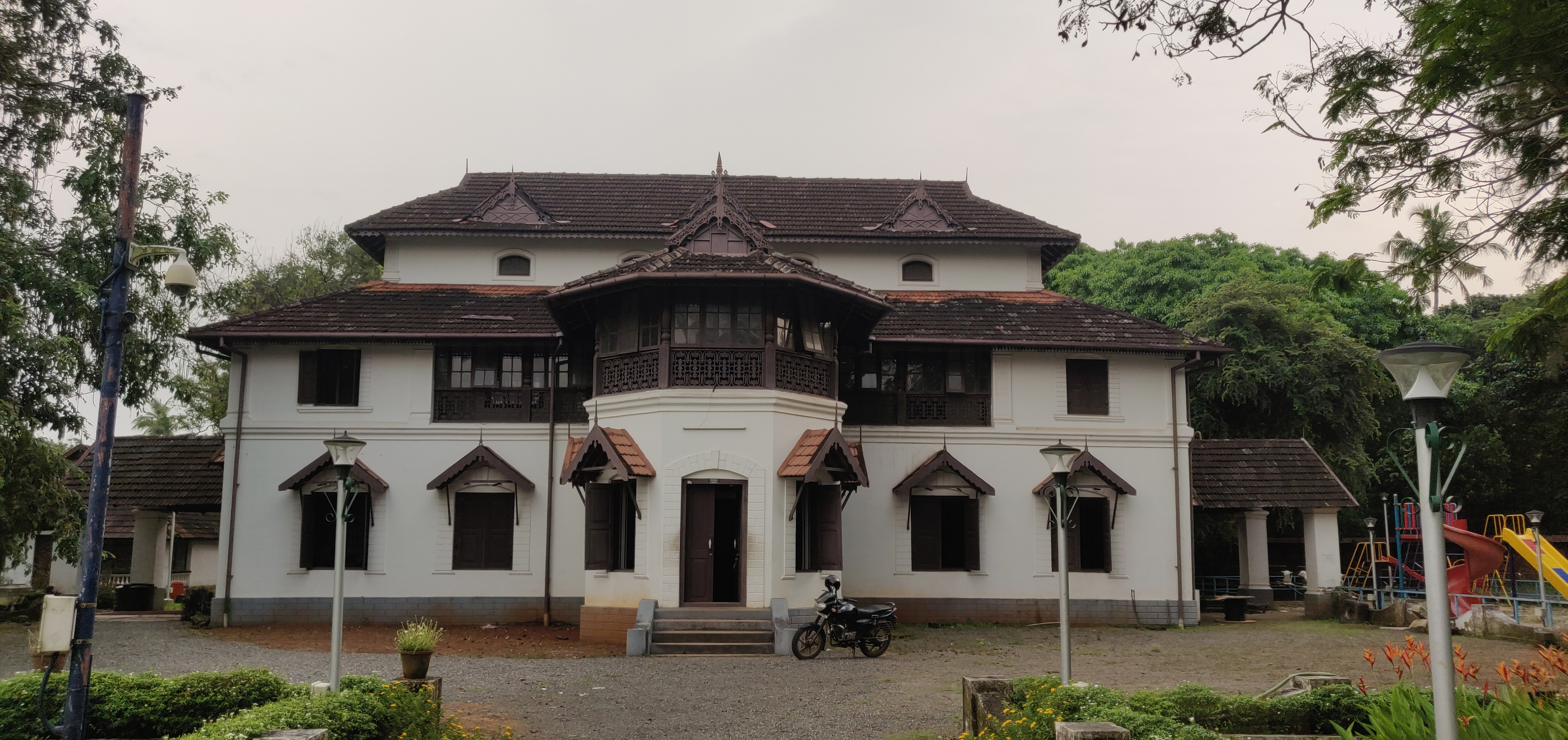
- Kollengode Palace
- Interactive map of the Kollengode Palace area

General information
- Architectural style: Kerala architecture
- Location: Thrissur, India
- Completed: 1904
- Client: Vasudeva Raja, Raja of Kollengode

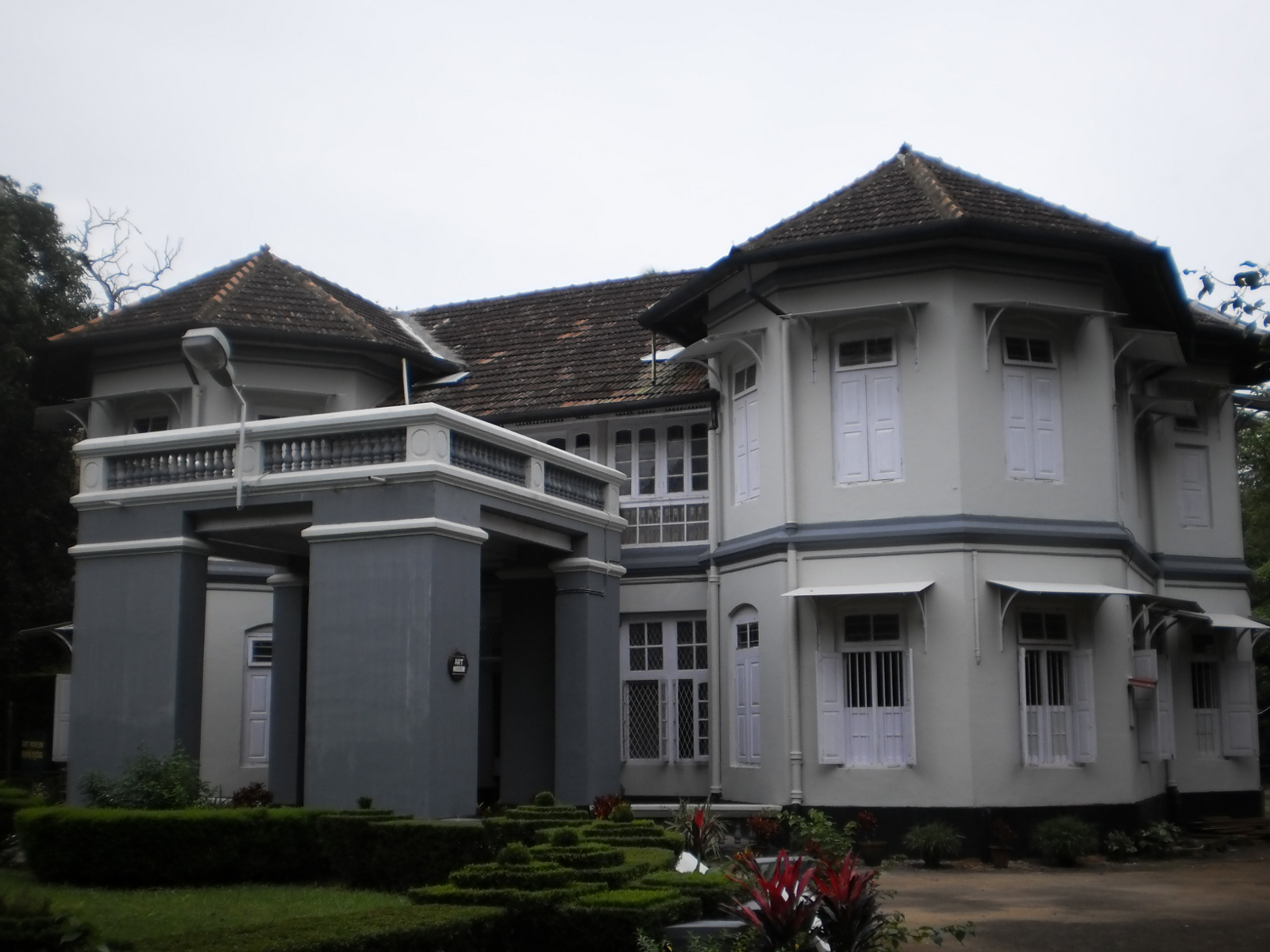

Kollengode Palace is a palace situated in Thrissur town of Thrissur district, Kerala state, India.

== History ==
The Raja of Kollengode, Vasudeva Raja, constructed this palace in 1904 and gave it to his daughter. The original Kollengode palace(kalari kovilakam) is situated in Kollengode, Palakkad. In 1975, the Department of Archeology acquired the property (part of Kollengode palace in Thrissur )and converted it into a museum. Some personal belongings of Vasudeva Raja are on display. The architecture of the palace is a unique blend of traditional Kerala architecture with western design. The palace now houses the Mural Art Museum (Thrissur).
