= Puthunagaram =

- Town
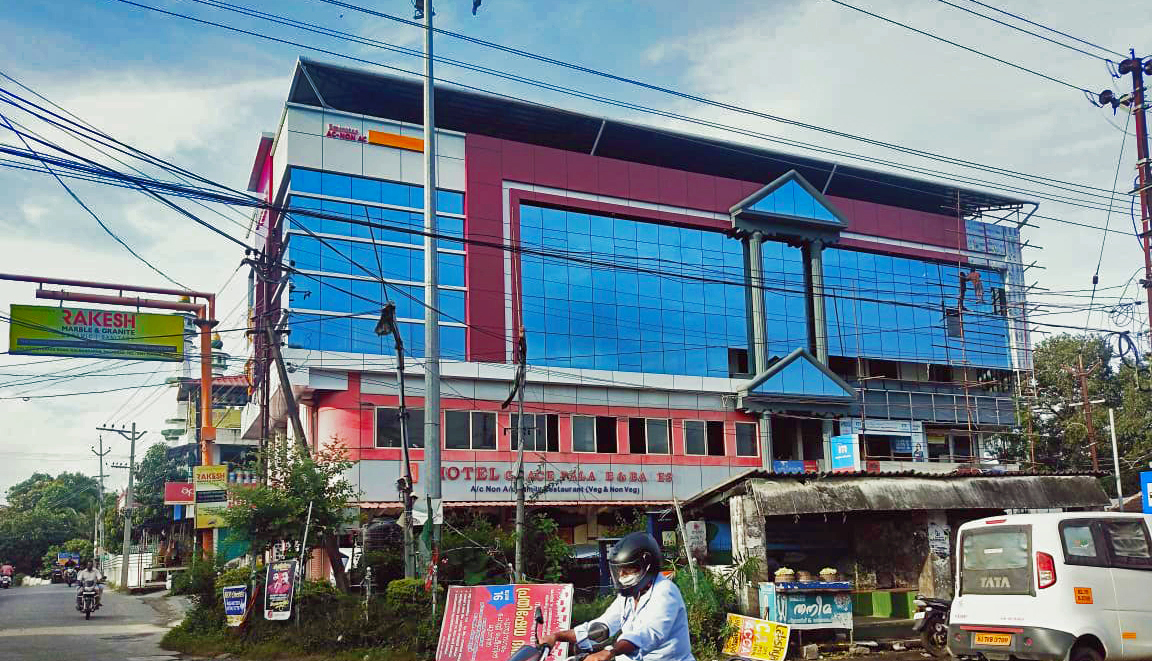
- Pudunagaram (Palakkad road)

- Location in Kerala, India Puthunagaram (India)
- Coordinates: 10°40′57.667″N 76°41′5.689″E
- Country: India
- State: Kerala
- District: Palakkad

Area
  - Total: 8.1 km^{2} (3.1 sq mi)

Population (2011)
  - Total: 17,892
  - Density: 2,200/km^{2} (5,700/sq mi)

Languages
  - Official: Malayalam, English
- Time zone: UTC+5:30 (IST)
- PIN: 678503
- Vehicle registration: KL -09, KL -70
- Nearest city: Palakkad
- Parliament constituency: Alathur
- Assembly constituency: Nenmara

Puthunagaram is a town and gram panchayat in the Palakkad district, state of Kerala, India. It is about 10 km south of Palakkad and 8 Km from Kollengode. Palakkad-Pollachi railway line passes through this town.

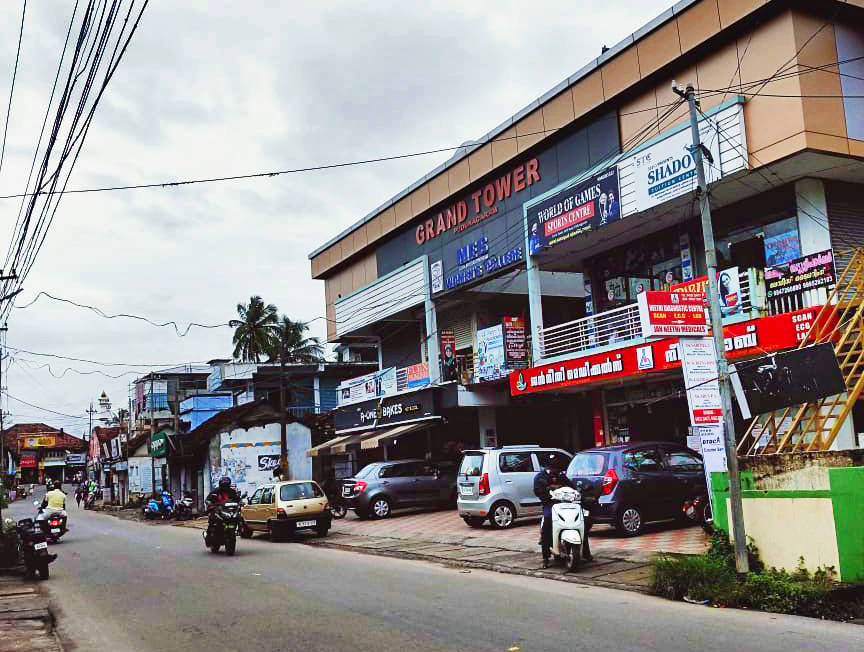
MHS ROAD, Pudunagaram

== Demographics ==
As of 2001 India census, Puthunagaram had a population of 16,367. Males constitute 50% of the population and females 50%. Puthunagaram has an average literacy rate of 73%, higher than the national average of 59.5%: male literacy is 80%, and female literacy is 67%. In Puthunagaram, 12% of the population is under 6 years of age.
