= Pokkunny =

- Village
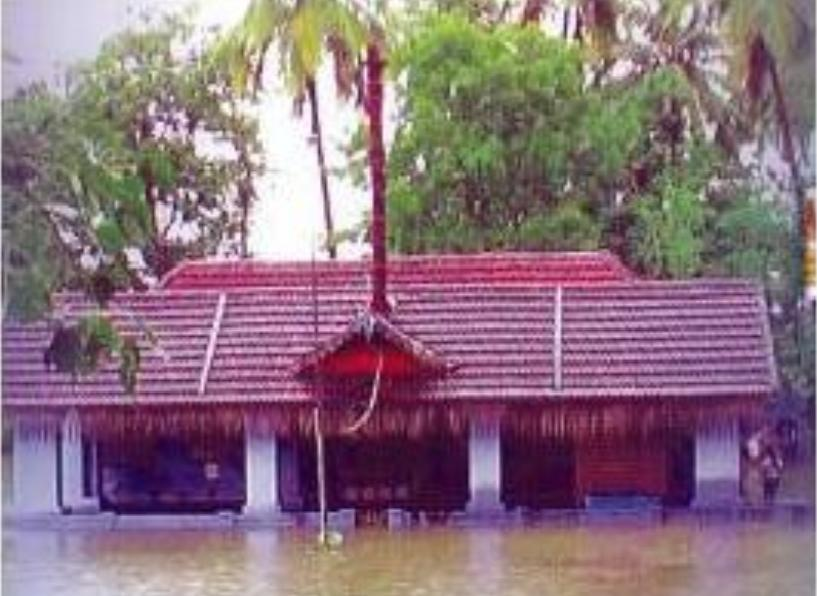
- Pokkunniappan temple
- Interactive map of Pokkunny
- Country: India
- State: Kerala
- District: Palakkad

Languages
  - Official: Malayalam, English
- Time zone: UTC+5:30 (IST)
- PIN: 679534
- Telephone code: 91466

Pokkunny is a village in Palakkad district, of Kerala, India. Pokkunny is an agricultural community, with mountains, ponds, irrigation canals, and paddies as parts of the landscape. The village is famous for the Pokkunny Appan (Lord Shiva) temple. Each year-end, the people celebrate Ayyapan Vilakku to show their devotion to their local god.
