= Vadavannur =

- village
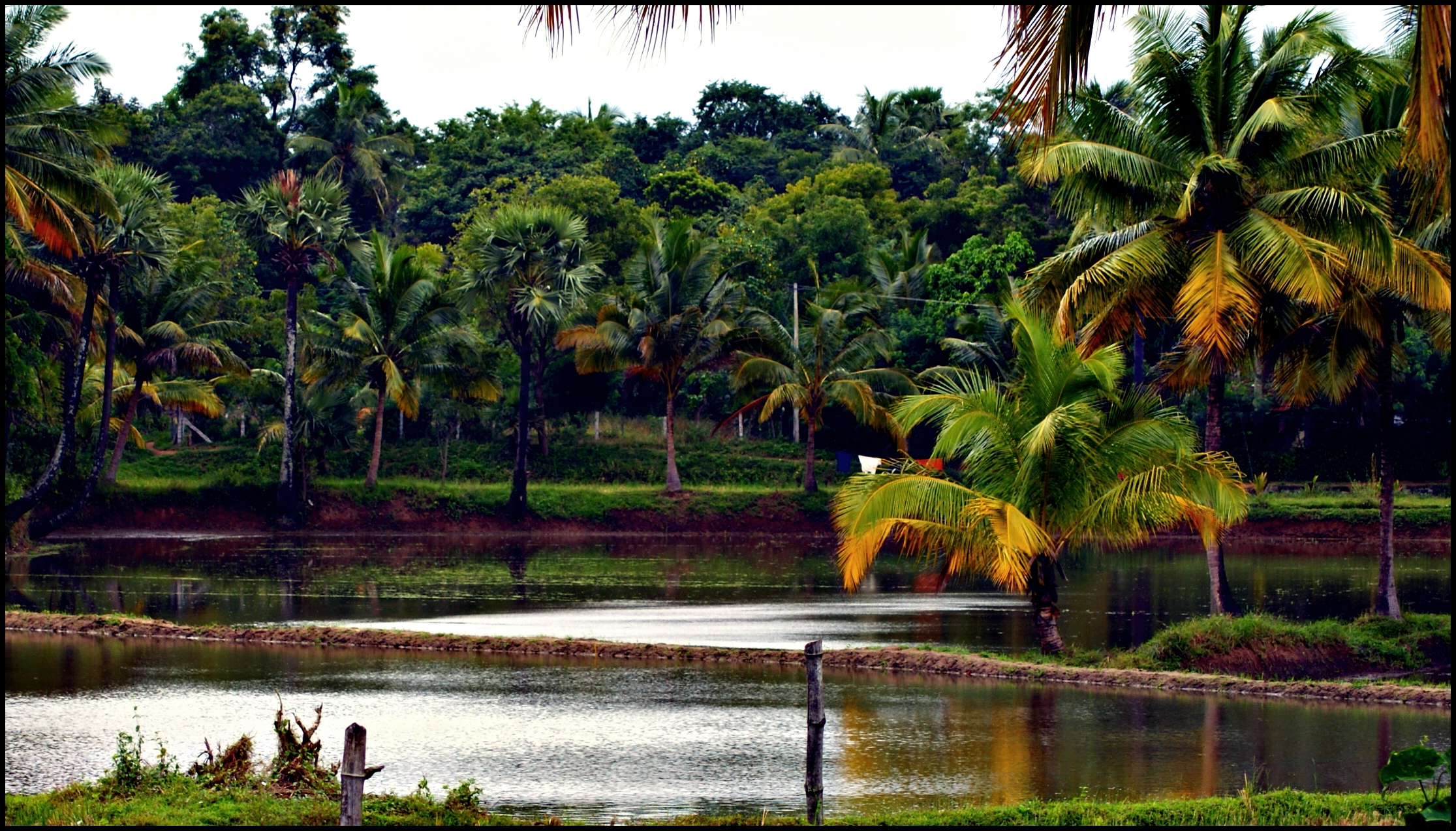
- Vadavannur rice fields

- Location in Kerala, India Vadavannur (India)
- Coordinates: 10°38′30″N 76°41′30″E
- Country: India
- State: Kerala
- District: Palakkad

Government
  - Body: Vaduvannur Grama Panchayat

Area
  - Total: 17.38 km^{2} (6.71 sq mi)

Population (2011)
  - Total: 17,126
  - Density: 985.4/km^{2} (2,552/sq mi)

Languages
  - Official: Malayalam, English
- Time zone: UTC+5:30 (IST)
- Vehicle registration: KL-70

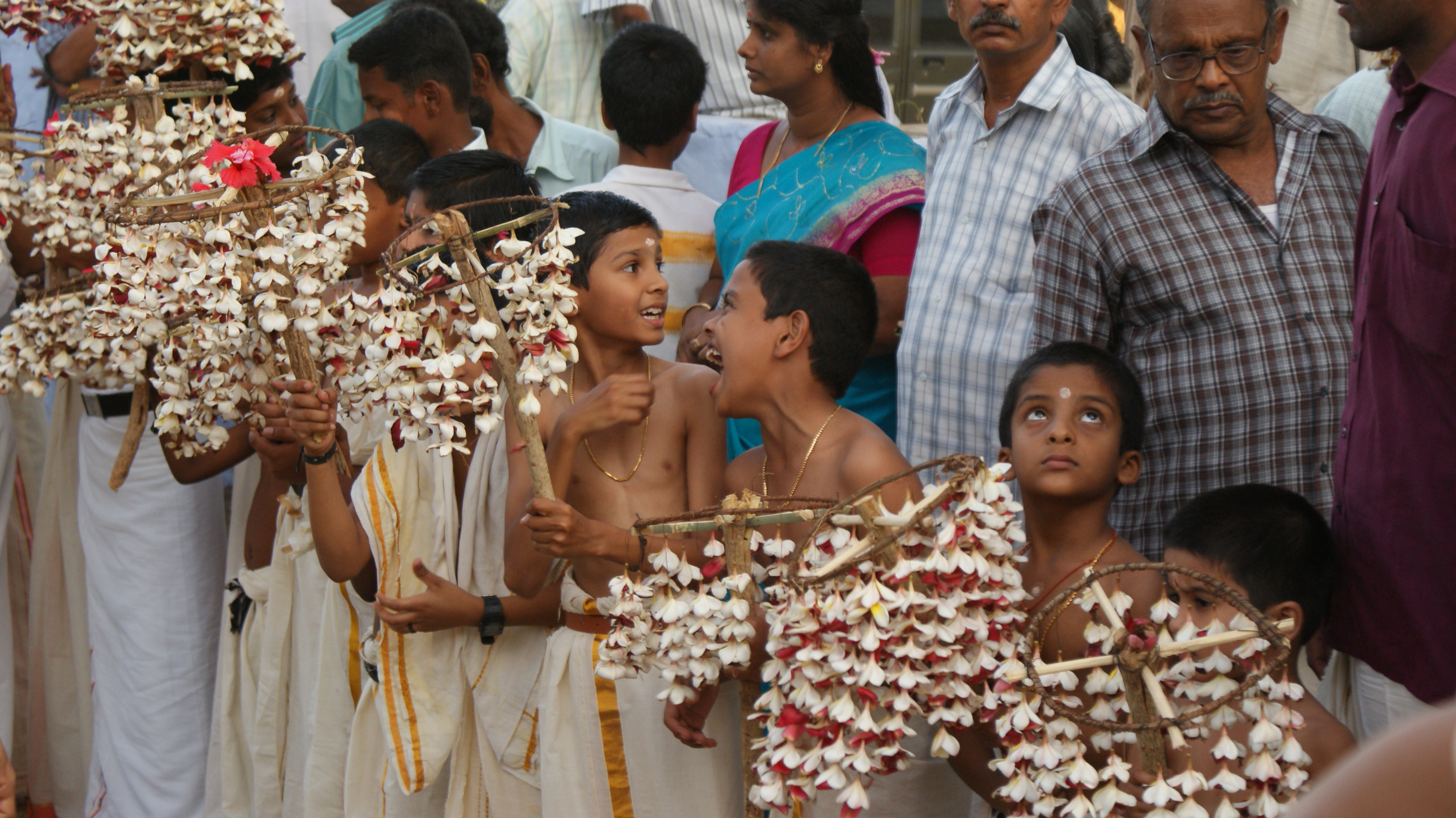
Kummatti festival

Vadavannur is a village and grama panchayat near to Kollengode Town in the Palakkad District of Kerala, India.

== Demographics ==
At the 2001 India census, Vadavannur had a population of 16,378, comprising 8,021 males and 8,357 females.
