= Kollengode, Palakkad =

Kollengode Vengunad, Ayaskarapuri (Ancient Name)
- Town
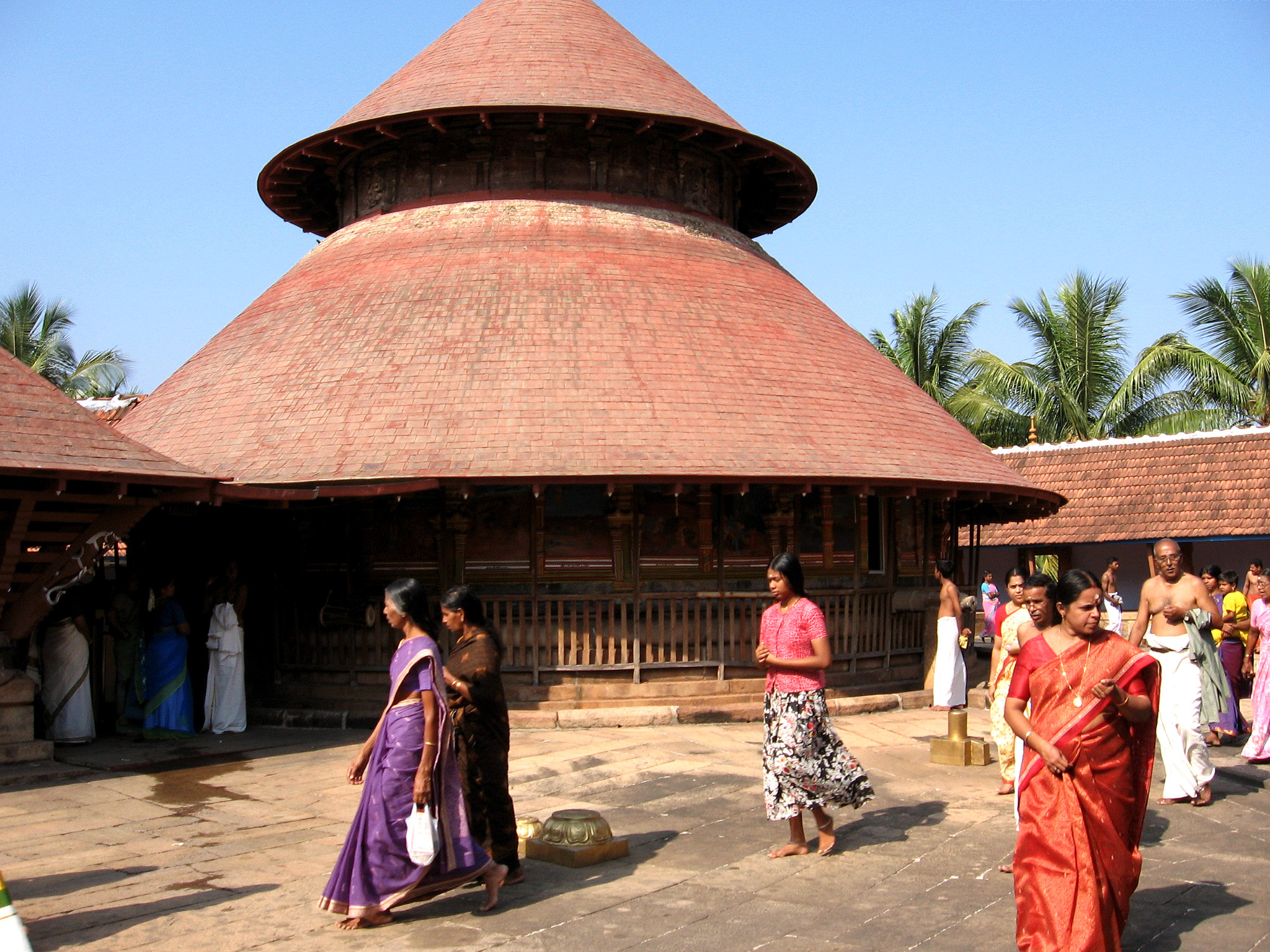
- Kachamkurissi Temple, Kollengode
- Nickname: Rice Bowl of Palakkad / Palace City
- Location in Kerala, India Kollengode (India)
- Coordinates: 10.6139°N 76.6908°E
- Country: India
- State: Kerala
- District: Palakkad

Government
  - Body: Kollengode Panchayat

Area
  - Total: 49.33 km^{2} (19.05 sq mi)
- Elevation: 123.14 m (404.0 ft)

Population (2011)
  - Total: 29,587
  - Density: 599.8/km^{2} (1,553/sq mi)

Languages
  - Official: Malayalam, English
- Time zone: UTC+5:30 (IST)
- PIN: 678506
- Vehicle registration: KL 70

Kollengode is a town in Palakkad district, Kerala, India. Kollengode Town is the headquarters of Kollengode Grama Panchayat and Kollengode Block Panchayat.

As of 2011 India census, Kollengode-I had a population of 18,258 with 8,911 males and 9,347 females. As of 2011 India census, Kollengode-II had a population of 11,329 with 5,463 males and 5,866 females.

Kollengode railway station is located at Oottara. State highway SH-58 passes through Kollengode. The nearest airport is Coimbatore around 70 km from Kollengode.

== River ==
The Gayathripuzha River, a tributary of Bharathappuzha, flows near the town.

== Kollengode Block Panchayat ==
Grama panchayats under Kollengode block panchayat are:

- Kollengode
- Koduvayur
- Puthunagaram
- Vadavannur
- Muthalamada
- Nenmeni

== Tourism ==
Kollengode is recognised for its scenic beauty, traditional Kerala architecture, paddy fields, and cultural heritage. It is often described as one of the most beautiful villages in India.

In June 2023, industrialist Anand Mahindra shared a list of India's most beautiful villages on social media after seeing a post by "Colours Of Bharat". Kollengode village in Kerala featured prominently in the list, prompting Mahindra to say the beauty left him "speechless" and that his bucket list for travel in India had "overflowed". The post received widespread attention and helped increase visibility of the town as a tourist destination.

Popular attractions in and around Kollengode include:

- Kollengode Palace – A heritage structure in traditional Kerala style.
- Seetharkundu Viewpoint – Offers panoramic views of the Western Ghats and surrounding plains.
- Kachamkurissi Temple – An ancient temple central to local culture.
- Palakapandi Waterfalls and nearby paddy fields.
- Chinganchira Temple and several eco-friendly homestays and farm retreats (such as Kudilidam) that allow visitors to experience authentic village life.

The area is known for its lush greenery, proximity to Nelliyampathy Hills, and traditional festivals.

== Gallery ==
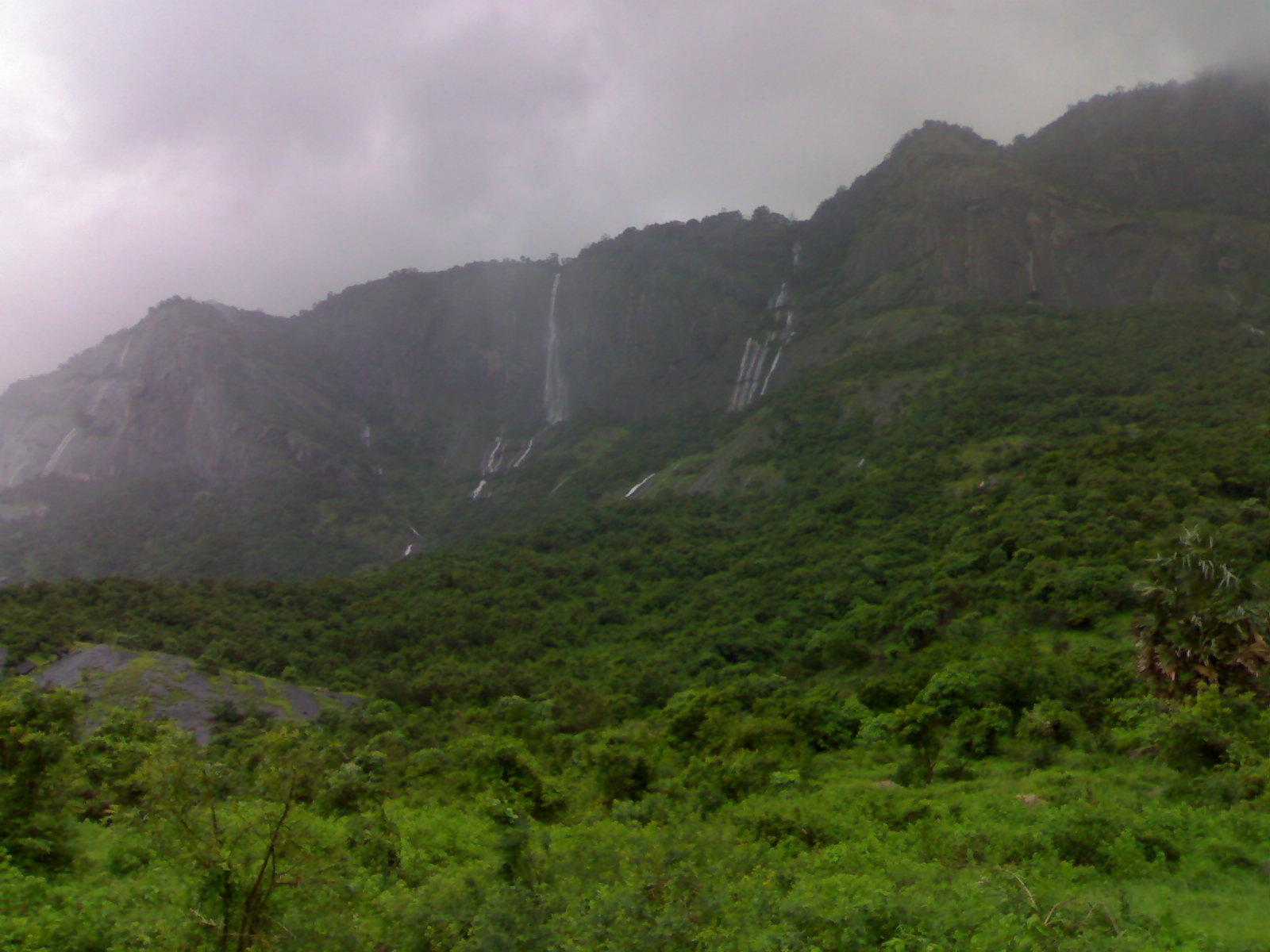
Palakapandi Waterfalls

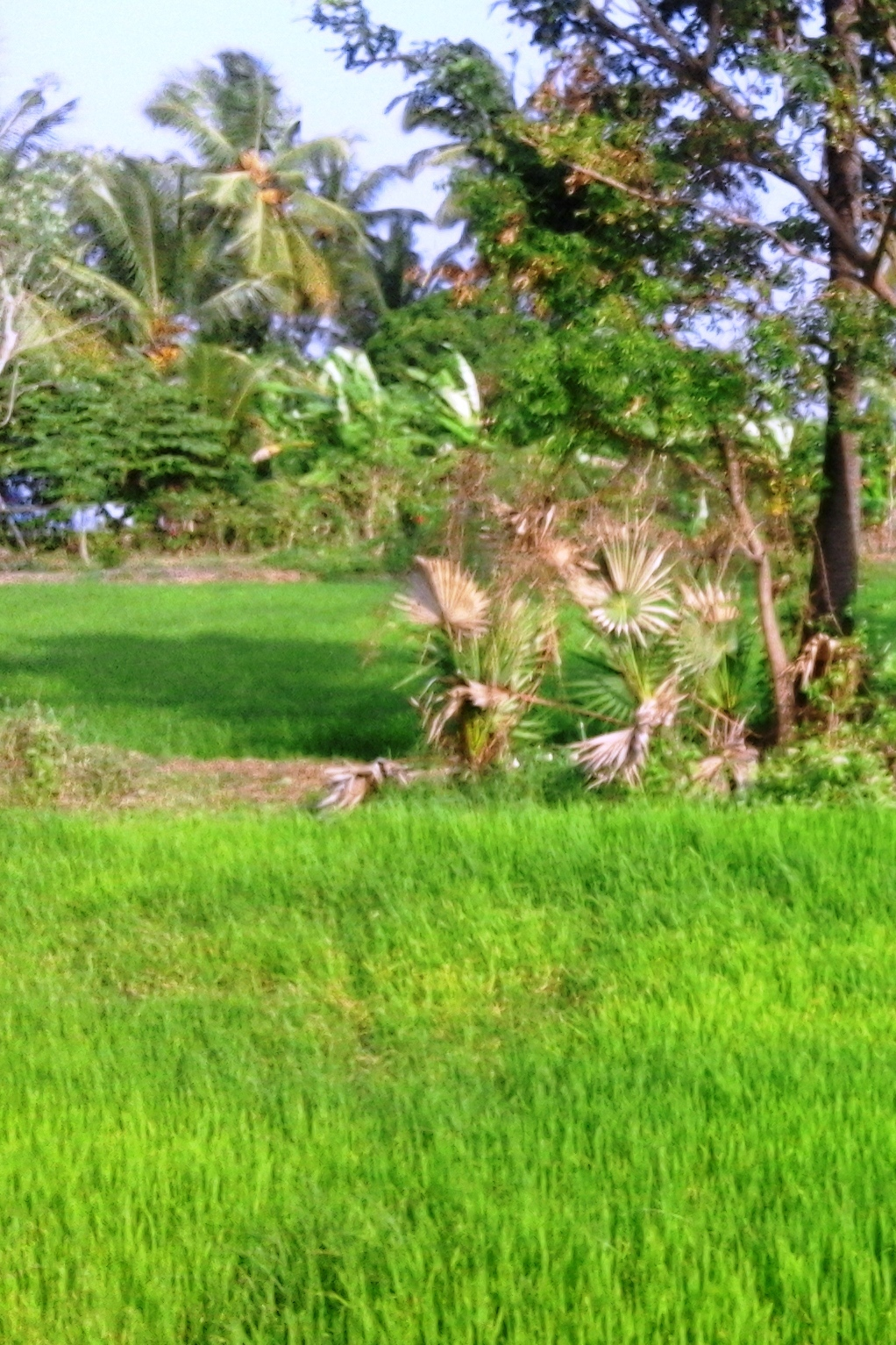
A paddy field in Kollengode
