= 2006 Kerala Legislative Assembly election =

- 22 April, 29 April, and 3 May 2006

All 140 seats in the Kerala Legislative Assembly 71 seats needed for a majority
- Turnout: 72.08% (▼0.39 pp)
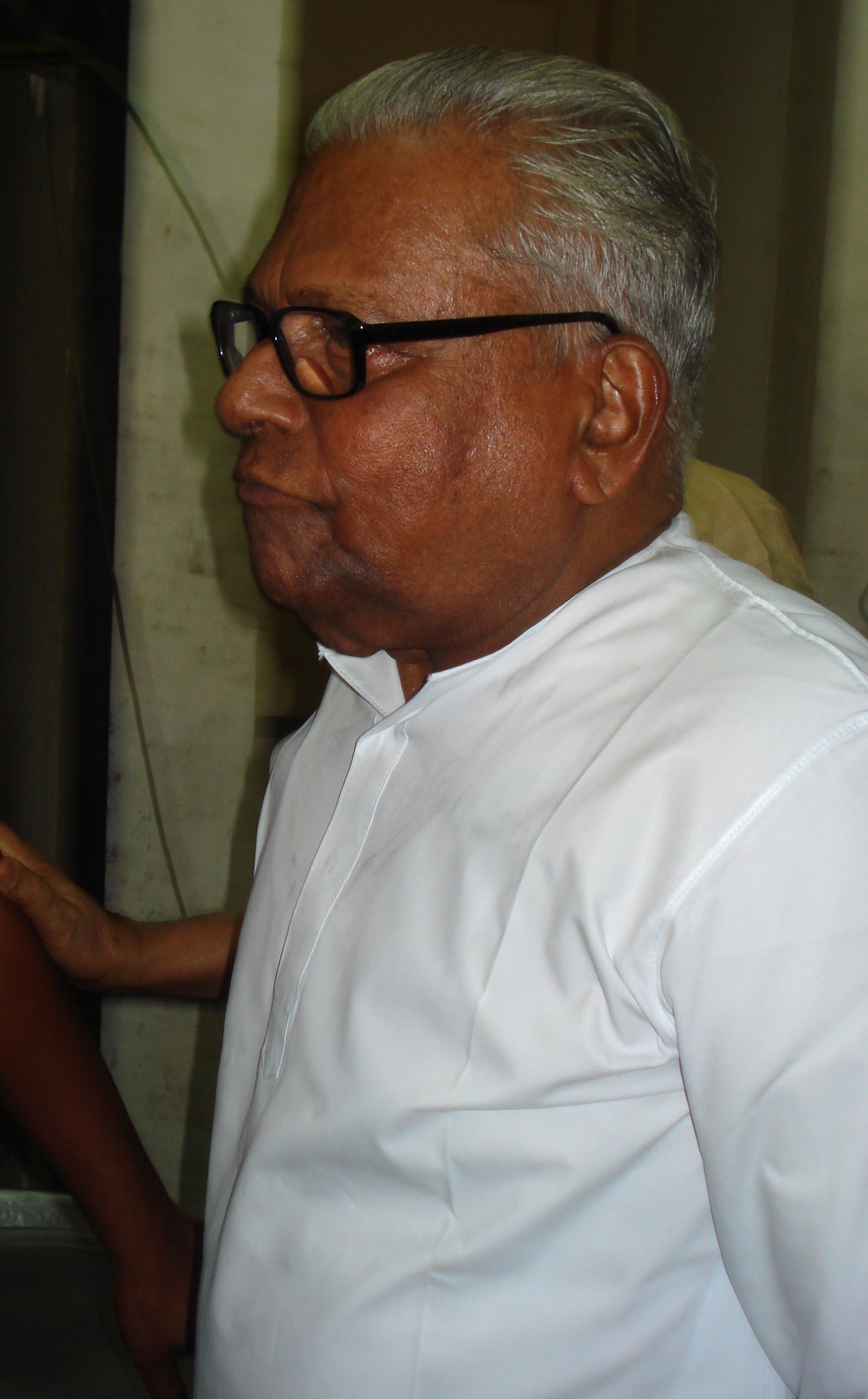

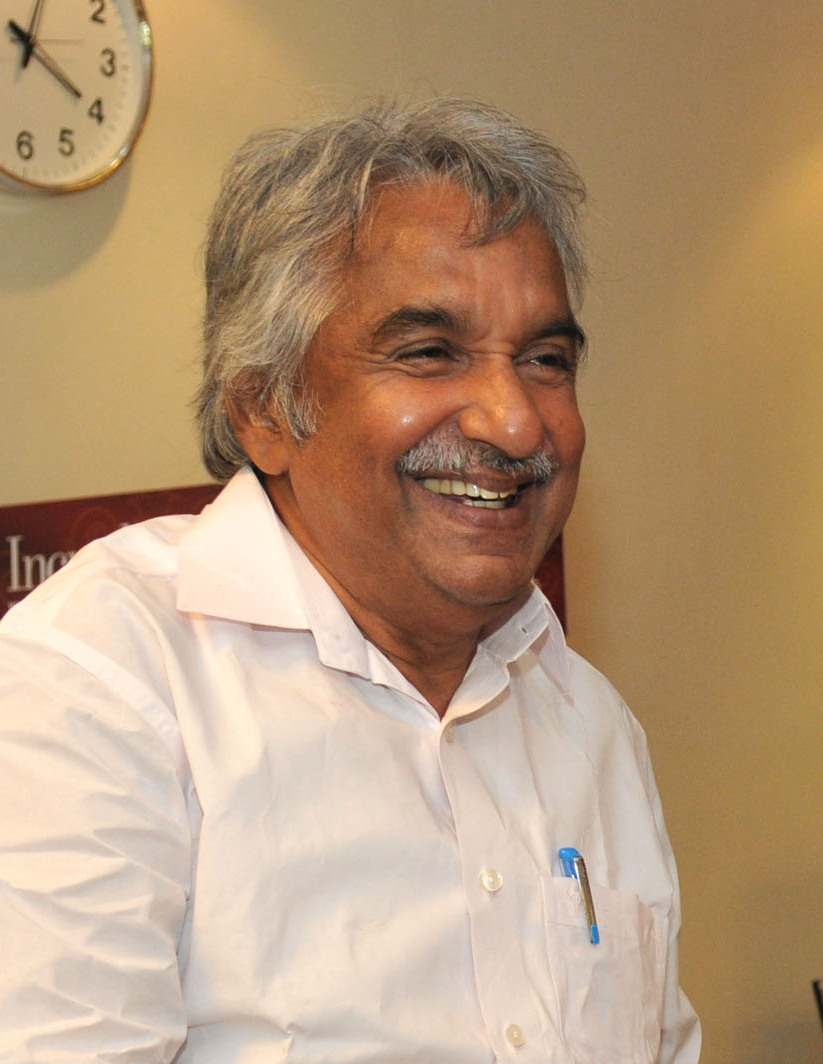
	First party	Second party
Leader	V. S. Achuthanandan	Oommen Chandy
Party	CPI(M)	INC
Alliance	LDF	UDF
Leader's seat	Malampuzha	Puthuppally
Last election	23.85%, 24 seats	31.4%, 63 seats
Seats won	61	24
Seat change	▲37	▼39
Popular vote	4,732,381	3,744,784
Percentage	30.45%	24.09%
Swing	▲6.6 pp	▼7.31 pp
Alliance seats	98	42
Alliance seat change	▲58	▼57
Alliance Popular Vote	7,558,834	6,679,557
Alliance Vote Share	48.63%	42.98%
- Kerala, India; Kerala, one of the states in South India, has an electorate of more than 21 million people.

- Alliance wise Result
Chief Minister before election
Oommen Chandy
INC
Elected Chief Minister
V. S. Achuthanandan
CPI(M)

The 2006 Kerala Legislative Assembly election, part of a series of state assembly elections in 2006, was held in three phases. The first phase was held on 22 April 2006, when 59 out of the 140 constituencies in Kerala voted. The second was held on 29 April for the 66 constituencies in central Kerala. The last phase of polling for the remaining 15 constituencies was on 3 May 2006. The counting was conducted on 11 May 2006.

The Communist Party of India (Marxist) -led Left Democratic Front beat the incumbent Indian National Congress-led United Democratic Front by a margin of 56 seats. V. S. Achuthanandan, who led the CPI(M) was sworn in as the Chief Minister of Kerala on 18 May 2006.

== Background ==
The UDF led government headed by A. K. Antony had won the previous elections held in 2001 by winning 99 seats. He later resigned on 28 August 2004 after UDF's dismal performance in Kerala for the Lok Sabha election that year, winning just one seat. Oommen Chandy replaced him later on 31 August.

== Parties and alliances ==
=== Left Democratic Front (Kerala) ===
Left Democratic Front (Kerala)

Party	Flag	Symbol	Leader	Contesting Seats
Communist Party of India (Marxist)			V. S. Achuthanandan	85
Communist Party of India			A. B. Bardhan	24
Janata Dal (Secular)		Janata Dal Election Symbol	Mathew T. Thomas	8
Kerala Congress (Joseph)			P. J. Joseph	6
Revolutionary Socialist Party				4
Indian National League				3
Nationalist Congress Party			Sharad Pawar	2
Congress (Secular)			Kadannappalli Ramachandran	1
Kerala Congress (Secular)			P. C. George	1
LDF-Independents				6
Total				140

=== United Democratic Front (Kerala) ===
United Democratic Front (Kerala)

Party	Flag	Symbol	Leader	Contesting Seats
Indian National Congress (Indira)			Oommen Chandy	77
Indian Union Muslim League			E. Ahamed	21
Democratic Indira Congress (Karunakaran)			K. Muraleedharan	18
Kerala Congress (Mani)			K. M. Mani	11
Janathipathiya Samrakshana Samithy			K. R. Gouri Amma	5
Communist Marxist Party				3
Kerala Congress (B)			R. Balakrishna Pillai	2
Revolutionary Socialist Party (Baby John)			Shibu Baby John	1
Revolutionary Socialist Party (Marxist)			Babu Divakaran	1
UDF-Independent				1
Total				140

=== Party/Alliance Wise Seat Matrix ===
Alliance & Party
Alliance & Party										Total (LDF)
Alliance & Party		UDF								Total (LDF)
Alliance & Party		INC	MUL	DIC	KCM	JSS	CMP	KCB	IND	Total (LDF)
LDF										
LDF	CPI(M)	52	10	10	5	3	1	1	3	85
LDF	CPI	13	2	3	1	2	2	1	—N/a	24
LDF	JD(S)	5	2	—N/a	1	—N/a	—N/a	—N/a	—N/a	8
LDF	KEC	3	—N/a	2	1	—N/a	—N/a	—N/a	—N/a	6
LDF	RSP	2	1	—N/a	—N/a	—N/a	—N/a	—N/a	1	4
LDF	INL	—N/a	3	—N/a	—N/a	—N/a	—N/a	—N/a	—N/a	3
LDF	NCP	1	—N/a	—N/a	1	—N/a	—N/a	—N/a	—N/a	2
LDF	C(S)	—N/a	—N/a	1	—N/a	—N/a	—N/a	—N/a	—N/a	1
LDF	KC(S)	—N/a	—N/a	—N/a	1	—N/a	—N/a	—N/a	—N/a	1
LDF	IND	1	3	1	1	—N/a	—N/a	—N/a	—N/a	6
Total (UDF)		77	21	17	11	5	3	2	4	140

== List of Candidates ==
Constituency		LDF		UDF	
#	Name	Party	Candidate	Party	Candidate
1	Manjeswar	CPM	C. H. Kunhambu	IUML	Cherkalam Abdullah
2	Kasaragod	INL	N. A. Nellikkunnu	IUML	C. T. Ahammed Ali
3	Udma	CPM	K. V. Kunhiraman	INC	P. Gangadharan Nair
4	Hosdrug (SC)	CPI	Pallipram Balan	DIC	P. Ramachandran
5	Trikkarpur	CPM	K. Kunhiraman	INC	A. V. Vamana Kumar
6	Irikkur	CPM	James Mathew	INC	K. C. Joseph
7	Payyannur	CPM	P. K. Sreemathy	INC	K. Surendran
8	Taliparamba	CPM	C. K. P. Padmanabhan	INC	Chandran Thillankeri
9	Azhicode	CPM	M. Prakasan Master	CMP	K. K. Nanu
10	Cannanore	CPM	K. P. Sahadevan	INC	K. Sudhakaran
11	Edakkad	C(S)	K. Ramachandran	DIC	K. C. Kadambooran
12	Tellicherry	CPM	Kodiyeri Balakrishnan	INC	Rajmohan Unnithan
13	Peringalam	JD(S)	K. P. Mohanan	IUML	Abdul Khader Muhammed
14	Kuthuparamba	CPM	P. Jayarajan	INC	Sajeev Joseph
15	Peravoor	CPM	K. K. Shailaja	INC	Prof. A. D. Mustafa
16	North Wynad (ST)	CPM	K. C. Kunhiraman	IUML	P. Balan
17	Badagara	JD(S)	Advocate M. K. Premnath	INC	Ponnarath Balakrishnan
18	Nadapuram	CPI	Binoy Viswam	INC	Advocate M. Veerankutty
19	Meppayur	CPM	K. K. Lathika	IUML	T. T. Ismail
20	Quilandy	CPM	P. Viswan	DIC	Advocate P. Sankaran
21	Perambra	CPM	K. Kunhammed Master	KC(M)	James Thekkanadan
22	Balusseri	NCP	A. K. Saseendran	INC	K. Balakrishnan Kidavu
23	Koduvally	IND	P. T. A. Rahim	DIC	K. Muraleedharan
24	Calicut- I	CPM	A. Pradeep Kumar	INC	Advocate A. Sujanapal
25	Calicut- II	INL	Advocate P. M. A. Salam	IUML	T. P. M. Zahir
26	Beypore	CPM	Elamaram Kareem	IUML	Ummer Pandikasala
27	Kunnamangalam (SC)	CPM	C. P. Balan Vaidyar	IND	U. C. Raman
28	Thiruvambadi	CPM	Mathayi Chacko	IUML	M. C. Mayin Hajee
29	Kalpetta	JD(S)	M. V. Shreyams Kumar	INC	K. K. Ramachandran Master
30	Sultan's Battery	CPM	P. Krishna Prasad	DIC	N. D. Appachan
31	Wandoor (SC)	CPM	Sankaran Korambayil	INC	A. P. Anilkumar
32	Nilambur	CPM	Sreeramakrishnan	INC	Aryadan Muhammed
33	Manjeri	INL	A. P. Abdul Wahab	IUML	P. K. Abdu Rabb
34	Malappuram	JD(S)	Advocate P. M. Safarulla	IUML	Advocate M. Ummer
35	Kondotty	CPM	Mohammedkutty T. P.	IUML	K. Muhammadunni Haji
36	Tirurangadi	CPI	K. Moideenkoya	IUML	Kutty Ahammed Kutty
37	Tanur	IND	P. K. Mhd Koya Kutty	IUML	Abdurahiman Randathani
38	Tirur	CPM	P. P. Abdullakkutty	IUML	E. T. Mohammed Basheer
39	Ponnani	CPM	Paloli Md. Kutty	DIC	M. P. Gangadharan
40	Kuttippuram	IND	K. T. Jaleel	IUML	P. K. Kunhalikutty
41	Mankada	IND	Manjalamkuzhi Ali	IUML	Dr. M. K. Muneer
42	Perinthalmanna	CPM	Sasi Kumar	IUML	Hameed Master
43	Thrithala (SC)	CPM	T. P. Kunjunni	INC	P. Balan
44	Pattambi	CPI	K. E. Esmail	INC	C. P. Mohammed
45	Ottapalam	CPM	M. Hamsa	INC	V. C. Kabeer Master
46	Sreekrishnapuram	CPM	K. S. Saleeka	INC	Adv. K. P. Anilkumar
47	Mannarkkad	CPI	Jose Baby	IUML	Kalathil Abdulla
48	Malampuzha	CPM	V. S. Achuthanandan	INC	Satheesan Pacheni
49	Palghat	CPM	K. K. Divakaran	INC	A. V. Gopinathan
50	Chittur	JD(S)	K. Krishnankutty	INC	K. Achuthan
51	Kollengode	CPM	V. Chenthamarakshan	INC	K. A. Chandran
52	Coyalmannam (SC)	CPM	A. K. Balan	INC	C. Prakash
53	Alathur	CPM	M. Chandhran	IND	A. Raghavan
54	Chelakara (SC)	CPM	K. Radhakrishnan	INC	P. C. Manikandan
55	Wadakkancherry	CPM	A. C. Moideen	DIC	T. V. Chandra Mohan
56	Kunnamkulam	CPM	Babu M. Palissery	DIC	Adv. V. Balaram
57	Cherpu	CPI	Adv. V. S. Sunilkumar	CMP	M. K. Kannan
58	Trichur	CPM	M. M. Varghese	INC	Therambil Ramakrishnan
59	Ollur	CPI	Rajaji Mathew Thomas	INC	Leelamma Teacher
60	Kodakara	CPM	Prof. C. Raveendranath	INC	Adv. K. P. Viswanathan
61	Chalakudi	CPM	B. D. Devassy	INC	Prof. Savithri Lakshmanan
62	Mala	CPI	A. K. Chandran	INC	T. U. Radhakrishnan
63	Irinjalakuda	CPM	C. K. Chandran (Chempara)	KC(M)	Adv. Thomas Unniyadan
64	Manalur	CPM	Murali Perunelli	INC	M. K. Paulson Master
65	Guruvayoor	CPM	K. V. Abdul Khader	IUML	C. H. Rasheed
66	Nattika	CPI	Fathima Ab. K. Pambinezhath	INC	T. N. Prathapan
67	Kodungallur	CPI	Adv. K. P. Rajendran	JSS	Umesh Challiyil
68	Ankamali	JD(S)	Jose Thettayil	INC	P. J. Joy
69	Vadakkekara	CPM	S. Sharma	DIC	M. A. Chandrasekharan
70	Parur	CPI	K. M. Dinakaran	INC	Adv. V. D. Satheesan
71	Narakal (SC)	CPM	M. K. Purushothaman	INC	Adv. P. V. Sreenijan
72	Ernakulam	CPM	M. M. Lowranace	INC	Prof. K. V. Thomas
73	Mattancherry	CPM	M. C. Josephine	IUML	V. K. Ebrahimkunju
74	Palluruthy	CPM	C. M. Dinesh Mani	INC	Dominic Presentation
75	Trippunithura	CPM	K. N. Raveendranath	INC	K. Babu
76	Alwaye	CPM	A. M. Yousuf	INC	K. Muhammadali
77	Perumbavoor	CPM	Saju Paul	INC	Shanimol Osman
78	Kunnathunad	CPM	Adv. M. M. Monayi	INC	P. P. Thankachan
79	Piravom	CPM	M. J. Jacob	DIC	T. M. Jacob
80	Muvattupuzha	CPI	Babu Paul	DIC	Adv. Johny Nelloor
81	Kothamangalam	KEC	T. U. Kuruvilla	INC	V. J. Paulose
82	Thodupuzha	KEC	P. J. Joseph	INC	Adv. P. T. Thomas
83	Devicolam (SC)	CPM	S. Rajendran	INC	A. K. Moni
84	Idukki	CPM	C. V. Varghese	KC(M)	Roshy Augustine
85	Udumbanchola	CPM	K. K. Jayachandran	DIC	Ebrahimkutty Kallar
86	Peermade	CPI	E. S. Bijimol	INC	Adv. E. M. Augasthy
87	Kanjirappally	IND	Alphons Kannanthanam	INC	Joseph Vazhacken
88	Vazhoor	CPI	Rajendran Parameswaran Nair	KC(M)	Jayarajan
89	Changanacherry	CPM	A. V. Russel	KC(M)	C. F. Thomas
90	Kottayam	CPM	V. N. Vasavan	INC	Ajay Tharayil
91	Ettumanoor	CPM	Adv. K. S. Krishnankutty Nair	KC(M)	Thomas Chazhikkadan
92	Puthuppally	CPM	Sindhu Joy	INC	Oommen Chandy
93	Poonjar	KC(S)	P. C. George (Plathottam)	KC(M)	Adv. T. V. Abraham Kaipanplackal
94	Palai	NCP	Mani C. Kappan	KC(M)	K. M. Mani
95	Kaduthuruthy	KEC	Adv. Mons Joseph	KC(M)	Stephen George
96	Vaikom (SC)	CPI	K. Ajith	INC	Adv. V. P. Sajeendran
97	Aroor	CPM	Adv. A. M. Ariff	JSS	K. R. Gowriamma
98	Sherthalai	CPI	P. Thilothaman	INC	C. K. Shajimohan
99	Mararikulam	CPM	Dr. Thomas Isaac	INC	Simmi Rose Bell John
100	Alleppey	CPI	T. J. Anjalose	INC	K. C. Venugopal
101	Ambalapuzha	CPM	G. Sudhakaran	DIC	Adv. D. Sugathan
102	Kuttanad	KEC	Dr. K. C. Joseph	DIC	Thomas Chandy
103	Haripad	CPM	T. K. Devakumar	INC	Adv. B. Babuprasad
104	Kayamkulam	CPM	C. K. Sadasivan	INC	Adv. C. R. Jayaprakash
105	Thiruvalla	JD(S)	Mathew T. Thomas	KC(M)	Victor Thomas
106	Kallooppara	IND	Cherian Philip	KC(M)	Joseph M. Puthusseri
107	Aranmula	CPM	K. C. Rajagopalan	DIC	Malethu Saraladevi
108	Chengannur	CPM	Saji Cherian	INC	P. C. Vishnunath
109	Mavelikara	CPM	G. Rajamma	INC	M. Murali
110	Pandalam (SC)	CPM	K. Raghavan	JSS	K. K. Shaju
111	Ranni	CPM	Raju Abraham	INC	Peelipose Thomas
112	Pathanamthitta	CPM	V. K. Purushothaman Pillai	INC	K. Sivadasan Nair
113	Konni	CPM	V. R. Sivarajan	INC	Adoor Prakash
114	Pathanapuram	CPI	K. R. Chandramohanan	KC(B)	K. B. Ganesh Kumar
115	Punaloor	CPI	Adv. K. Raju	CMP	M. V. Raghavan
116	Chadayamangalam	CPI	Mullakkara Retnakaran	INC	Prayar Gopalakrishnan
117	Kottarakara	CPM	Adv. Aisha Potti	KC(B)	R. Balakrishna Pillai
118	Neduvathur (SC)	CPM	B. Raghavan	INC	Ezhukone Narayanan
119	Adoor	KEC	Prof. D. K. John	INC	T. Radhakrishnan
120	Kunnathur (SC)	RSP	Kovoor Kunjumon	INC	P. Ramabhadran
121	Karunagapally	CPI	C. Divakaran	JSS	A. N. Rajan Babu
122	Chavara	RSP	N. K. Premachandran	IND	Shibu Baby John (Note: Revolutionary Socialist Party (Baby John) candidate contested as Independent with support of UDF)
123	Kundara	CPM	M. A. Baby	INC	Kadavoor Sivadasan
124	Quilon	CPM	P. K. Gurudasan	IND	Babu Divakaran (Note: Revolutionary Socialist Party (Marxist) candidate contested as Independent with support of UDF)
125	Eravipuram	RSP	A. A. Aziz	IUML	K. M. Shaji
126	Chathanoor	CPI	N. Anirudhan	INC	G. Prathapa Thampan
127	Varkala	CPM	Adv. S. Sundaresan	INC	Varkala Kahar
128	Attingal	CPM	Anathalavattom Anandan	INC	Adv. C. Mohanachandran
129	Kilimanoor (SC)	CPI	N. Rajan	DIC	Kavalloor Madhu
130	Vamanapuram	CPM	J. Arundhathi	JSS	Adv. S. Shine
131	Ariyanad	RSP	T. J. Chandrachoodan	INC	G. Karthikeyan Aryanad
132	Nedumangad	CPI	Mankode Radhakrishnan	INC	Palode Ravi
133	Kazhakuttam	CPM	Kadakampally Surendran	INC	M. A. Vaheed
134	Trivandrum North	CPM	M. Vijayakumar	INC	Adv. K. Mohankumar
135	Trivandrum West	KEC	V. Surendran Pillai	DIC	Shobhana George
136	Trivandrum East	CPM	V. Sivankutty	INC	B. Vijayakumar
137	Nemom	CPM	Venganoor P. Bhaskaran	INC	N. Sakthan
138	Kovalam	JD(S)	Rufus Daniel	INC	George Mercier
139	Neyyattinkara	CPM	V. J. Thankappan	INC	Thampanoor Ravi
140	Parassala	CPM	R. Selvaraj	INC	N. Sundaran Nadar

== Results ==
Party	Votes	%	Seats	+/–
Communist Party of India (Marxist)	4,732,381	30.45	61	–
Indian National Congress	3,744,784	24.09	24	–
Communist Party of India	1,257,422	8.09	17	–
Indian Union Muslim League	1,135,098	7.30	7	–
Democratic Indira Congress (Karunakaran)	664,159	4.27	1	–
Kerala Congress (Mani)	507,349	3.26	7	–
Janata Dal (Secular)	379,286	2.44	5	–
Kerala Congress	271,854	1.75	4	–
Janathipathiya Samrakshana Samithy	235,361	1.51	1	–
Revolutionary Socialist Party	224,129	1.44	3	–
Indian National League	140,194	0.90	1	–
Nationalist Congress Party	99,189	0.64	1	–
Kerala Congress (Balakrishna Pillai)	95,710	0.62	1	–
Congress (Secular)	72,579	0.47	1	–
Kerala Congress (Secular)	48,795	0.31	1	–
Others	997,114	6.42	0	0
Independents	936,885	6.03	5	–
Total	15,542,289	100.00	140	0
Valid votes	15,542,289	99.98		
Invalid/blank votes	2,951	0.02		
Total votes	15,545,240	100.00		
Registered voters/turnout	21,483,937	72.36		
Source: ECI

=== Constituency-wise results ===
Constituency		Winner					Runner Up					Margin	%
#	Name	Candidate	P	A	Votes	%	Candidate	P	A	Votes	%	Margin	%
1	Manjeswar (SC)	C. H. Kunhambu	CPM	LDF	39,242	35.71	Narayana Bhat	BJP	NDA	34,413	31.32	4,829	4.39
2	Kasaragod	C. T. Ahammed Ali	IUML	UDF	38,774	38.70	V. Ravindran	BJP	NDA	28,432	28.38	10,342	10.32
3	Udma	K. V. Kunhiraman	CPM	LDF	69,221	55.61	P. Gangadharan Nair	INC	UDF	41,927	33.68	27,294	21.93
4	Hosdrug (SC)	Pallipram Balan	CPI	LDF	71,751	55.92	P. Ramachandran	DIC	UDF	36,812	28.69	34,939	27.23
5	Trikkarpur	K. Kunhiraman	CPM	LDF	81,050	55.91	A. V. Vamana Kumar	INC	UDF	57,222	39.47	23,828	16.44
6	Irikkur	K. C. Joseph	INC	UDF	63,649	48.58	James Mathew	CPM	LDF	61,818	47.18	1,831	1.40
7	Payyannur	P. K. Sreemathy	CPM	LDF	76,974	61.74	K. Surendran	INC	UDF	40,852	32.76	36,122	28.98
8	Taliparamba	C. K. P. Padmanabhan	CPM	LDF	82,994	57.47	Chandran Thillankeri	INC	UDF	53,456	37.02	29,538	20.45
9	Azhicode	M. Prakasan Master	CPM	LDF	62,768	61.71	K. K. Nanu	CMP	UDF	33,300	32.74	29,468	28.97
10	Cannanore	K. Sudhakaran	INC	UDF	49,745	51.10	K. P. Sahadevan	CPM	LDF	41,132	42.26	8,613	8.84
11	Edakkad	K. Ramachandran	C(S)	LDF	72,579	58.07	K. C. Kadambooran	DIC	UDF	41,907	33.53	30,672	24.54
12	Tellicherry	Kodiyeri Balakrishnan	CPM	LDF	53,907	53.12	Rajmohan Unnithan	INC	UDF	43,852	43.21	10,055	9.91
13	Peringalam	K. P. Mohanan	JD(S)	LDF	57,840	51.94	Abdul Khader Md.	IUML	UDF	38,604	34.66	19,236	17.28
14	Kuthuparamba	P. Jayarajan	CPM	LDF	78,246	62.62	Sajeev Joseph	INC	UDF	39,919	31.94	38,327	30.68
15	Peravoor	K. K. Shailaja	CPM	LDF	72,065	50.18	A. D. Mustafa	INC	UDF	62,966	43.84	9,099	6.34
16	North Wynad (ST)	K. C. Kunhiraman	CPM	LDF	61,970	48.92	P. Balan	IUML	UDF	46,855	36.99	15,115	11.93
17	Badagara	M. K. Premnath	JD(S)	LDF	64,932	54.60	Ponnarath Balakrishnan	INC	UDF	43,663	36.71	21,269	17.89
18	Nadapuram	Binoy Viswam	CPI	LDF	67,138	53.33	M. Veerankutty	INC	UDF	49,689	39.47	17,449	13.86
19	Meppayur	K. K. Lathika	CPM	LDF	70,369	52.65	T. T. Ismail	IUML	UDF	54,482	40.77	15,887	11.88
20	Quilandy	P. Viswan	CPM	LDF	65,514	51.10	P. Sankaran	DIC	UDF	47,030	36.68	18,484	14.42
21	Perambra	K. Kunhammad	CPM	LDF	69,004	50.93	James Thekkanadan	KC(M)	LDF	58,364	43.08	10,640	7.85
22	Balusseri	A. K. Saseendran	NCP	LDF	60,340	52.08	K. Balakrishnan Kidavu	INC	UDF	46,180	39.86	14,160	12.22
23	Koduvally	P. T. A. Rahim	IND	LDF	65,302	48.07	K. Muraleedharan	DIC	UDF	57,796	42.54	7,506	5.53
24	Calicut-I	A. Pradeepkumar	CPM	LDF	45,693	50.03	A. Sujanapal	INC	UDF	37,988	41.59	7,705	8.44
25	Calicut- II	P. M. A. Salam	INL	LDF	51,130	51.91	T. P. M. Zahir	IUML	UDF	37,037	37.60	14,093	14.31
26	Beypore	Elamaram Kareem	CPM	LDF	69,798	51.60	Ummer Pandikasala	IUML	UDF	50,180	37.09	19,618	14.51
27	Kunnamangalam (SC)	U. C. Raman	IND	UDF	60,027	46.27	C. P. Balan Vaidyar	CPM	LDF	59,730	46.04	297	0.23
28	Thiruvambadi	Mathai Chacko	CPM	LDF	61,104	49.67	M. C. Mayin Hajee	IUML	UDF	55,625	45.21	5,479	4.46
29	Kalpetta	M. V. Shreyams Kumar	JD(S)	LDF	50,023	43.87	K. K. Ramachandran	INC	UDF	48,182	42.25	1,841	1.62
30	Sultan's Battery	P. Krishna Prasad	CPM	LDF	63,092	50.39	N. D. Appachan	DIC	UDF	37,552	29.99	25,540	20.40
31	Wandoor (SC)	A. P. Anil Kumar	INC	UDF	85,118	53.87	Sankaran Korambayil	CPM	LDF	67,957	43.01	17,161	10.86
32	Nilambur	Aryadan Md.	INC	UDF	87,522	53.76	P. Sreeramakrishnan	CPM	LDF	69,452	42.66	18,070	11.10
33	Manjeri	Abdu Rabb	IUML	UDF	76,646	52.31	A. P. Abdul Wahab	INL	LDF	61,274	41.82	15,372	10.49
34	Malappuram	M. Ummer	IUML	UDF	70,056	58.41	P. M. Safarulla	JD(S)	LDF	39,399	32.85	30,657	25.56
35	Kondotty	K. Muhammadunni Haji	IUML	UDF	74,950	52.18	T. P. Mohammedkutty	CPM	LDF	59,978	41.76	14,972	10.42
36	Tirurangadi	Kutty Ahammed Kutty	IUML	UDF	60,359	52.12	K. Moideenkoya	CPI	LDF	44,236	38.20	16,123	13.92
37	Tanur	Abdurahiman Randathani	IUML	UDF	64,038	50.20	P. K. Mohammed Kutty Koya	IND	LDF	52,868	41.45	11,170	8.75
38	Tirur	P. P. Abdullakkutty	CPM	LDF	71,270	48.78	E. T. Md. Basheer	IUML	UDF	62,590	42.84	8,680	5.94
39	Ponnani	Paloli Kutty	CPM	LDF	63,018	55.11	M. P. Gangadharan	DIC	UDF	34,671	30.32	28,347	24.79
40	Kuttippuram	K. T. Jaleel	IND	LDF	64,207	49.93	P. K. Kunhalikutty	IUML	UDF	55,426	43.10	8,781	6.83
41	Mankada	Manjalamkuzhi Ali	IND	LDF	79,613	49.15	M. K. Muneer	IUML	UDF	74,540	46.01	5,073	3.14
42	Perinthalmanna	V. Sasikumar	CPM	LDF	76,059	52.40	Hameed Master	IUML	UDF	62,056	42.75	14,003	9.65
43	Thrithala (SC)	T. P. Kunjunni	CPM	LDF	59,093	48.29	P. Balan	INC	UDF	52,144	42.61	6,949	5.68
44	Pattambi	C. P. Mohammed	INC	UDF	57,752	45.86	K. E. Esmail	CPI	LDF	57,186	45.41	566	0.45
45	Ottapalam	M. Hamsa	CPM	LDF	63,447	55.71	V. C. Kabeer Master	INC	UDF	39,104	34.33	24,343	21.38
46	Sreekrishnapuram	K. S. Saleeka	CPM	LDF	67,872	47.82	Adv. K. P. Anilkumar	INC	UDF	63,524	44.76	4,348	3.06
47	Mannarkkad	Jose Baby	CPI	LDF	70,172	49.63	Kalathil Abdulla	IUML	UDF	62,959	44.53	7,213	5.10
48	Malampuzha	V. S. Achuthanandan	CPM	LDF	64,775	55.45	Satheesan Pacheni	INC	UDF	44,758	38.31	20,017	17.14
49	Palghat	K. K. Divakaran	CPM	LDF	41,166	36.97	A. V. Gopinathan	INC	UDF	39,822	35.76	1,344	1.21
50	Chittur	K. Achuthan	INC	UDF	55,352	46.50	Ezhuthani K. Krishnankutty	JD(S)	LDF	53,340	44.81	2,012	1.69
51	Kollengode	V. Chenthamarakshan	CPM	LDF	55,934	48.73	K. A. Chandran	INC	UDF	50,808	44.27	5,126	4.46
52	Coyalmannam (SC)	A. K. Balan	CPM	LDF	59,239	52.02	C. Prakash	INC	UDF	45,369	39.84	13,870	12.18
53	Alathur	M. Chandhran	CPM	LDF	73,231	65.61	A. Raghavan	IND	UDF	25,560	22.90	47,671	42.71
54	Chelakara (SC)	K. Radhakrishnan	CPM	LDF	62,695	53.58	P. C. Manikandan	INC	UDF	48,066	41.08	14,629	12.50
55	Wadakkancherry	A. C. Moideen	CPM	LDF	66,928	54.96	T. V. Chandra Mohan	DIC	UDF	46,107	37.86	20,821	17.10
56	Kunnamkulam	Babu M. Palissery	CPM	LDF	61,865	53.35	Adv. V. Balaram	DIC	UDF	40,080	34.56	21,785	18.79
57	Cherpu	Adv. V. S. Sunilkumar	CPI	LDF	56,380	53.99	M. K. Kannan	CMP	UDF	41,776	40.00	14,604	13.99
58	Trichur	T. Ramakrishnan	INC	UDF	45,655	47.81	M. M. Varghese	CPM	LDF	43,059	45.09	2,596	2.72
59	Ollur	Rajaji Mathew Thomas	CPI	LDF	61,467	50.00	Leelamma Teacher	INC	UDF	53,498	43.51	7,969	6.49
60	Kodakara	Prof. C. Raveendranath	CPM	LDF	61,499	54.00	Adv. K. P. Viswanathan	INC	UDF	41,616	36.54	19,883	17.46
61	Chalakudi	B. D. Devassy	CPM	LDF	51,378	53.73	Prof. Savithri Lakshmanan	INC	UDF	36,823	38.51	14,555	15.22
62	Mala	A. K. Chandran	CPI	LDF	46,004	44.86	T. U. Radhakrishnan	INC	UDF	38,976	38.01	7,028	6.85
63	Irinjalakuda	Thomas Unniyadan	KC(M)	UDF	58,825	50.66	C. K. Chandran	CPM	LDF	50,830	43.78	7,995	6.88
64	Manalur	Murali Perunelly	CPM	LDF	49,598	50.27	M. K. Paulson Master	INC	UDF	41,878	42.45	7,720	7.82
65	Guruvayoor	K. V. Abdul Khader	CPM	LDF	51,740	50.56	C. H. Rasheed	IUML	UDF	39,431	38.53	12,309	12.03
66	Nattika	T. N. Prathapan	INC	UDF	52,511	51.80	Fathima Pambinezhath	CPI	LDF	42,825	42.24	9,686	9.56
67	Kodungallur	K. P. Rajendran	CPI	LDF	53,197	46.28	Umesh Challiyil	JSS	UDF	50,675	44.08	2,522	2.20
68	Ankamali	Jose Thettayil	JD(S)	LDF	58,703	49.52	P. J. Joy	INC	UDF	52,609	44.38	6,094	5.14
69	Vadakkekara	S. Sharma	CPM	LDF	51,590	46.77	M. A. Chandrasekharan	DIC	UDF	48,516	43.98	3,074	2.79
70	Parur	V. D. Satheesan	INC	UDF	51,099	51.06	K. M. Dinakaran	CPI	LDF	43,307	43.27	7,792	7.79
71	Narakal (SC)	M. K. Purushothaman	CPM	LDF	46,681	48.44	P. V. Sreenijan	INC	UDF	44,050	45.71	2,631	2.73
72	Ernakulam	K. V. Thomas	INC	UDF	43,148	49.72	M. M. Lowranace	CPM	LDF	37,348	43.04	5,800	6.68
73	Mattancherry	V. K. Ebrahimkunju	IUML	UDF	36,119	60.02	M. C. Josephine	CPM	LDF	20,587	34.21	15,532	25.81
74	Palluruthy	C. M. Dinesh Mani	CPM	LDF	60,959	49.93	Dominic Presentation	INC	UDF	54,701	44.80	6,258	5.13
75	Trippunithura	K. Babu	INC	UDF	70,935	50.67	K. N. Raveendranath	CPM	LDF	63,593	45.42	7,342	5.25
76	Alwaye	A. M. Yousuf	CPM	LDF	60,548	47.66	K. Md. Ali	INC	UDF	56,182	44.22	4,366	3.44
77	Perumbavoor	Saju Paul	CPM	LDF	63,307	53.06	Shanimol Osman	INC	UDF	50,846	42.61	12,461	10.45
78	Kunnathunad	M. M. Monayi	CPM	LDF	57,584	48.77	P. P. Thankachan	INC	UDF	55,527	47.03	2,057	1.74
79	Piravom	M. J. Jacob	CPM	LDF	52,903	49.03	T. M. Jacob	DIC	UDF	47,753	44.26	5,150	4.77
80	Muvattupuzha	Babu Paul	CPI	LDF	48,338	50.53	Johnny Nellore	DIC	UDF	35,113	36.70	13,225	13.83
81	Kothamangalam	T. U. Kuruvilla	KEC	LDF	51,498	47.85	V. J. Paulose	INC	UDF	49,684	46.16	1,814	1.69
82	Thodupuzha	P. J. Joseph	KEC	LDF	68,641	53.72	P. T. Thomas	INC	UDF	54,860	42.94	13,781	10.78
83	Devicolam (SC)	S. Rajendran	CPM	LDF	52,795	50.46	A. K. Moni	INC	UDF	46,908	44.83	5,887	5.63
84	Idukki	Roshy Augustine	KC(M)	UDF	61,883	55.34	C. V. Varghese	CPM	LDF	45,543	40.73	16,340	14.61
85	Udumbanchola	K. K. Jayachandran	CPM	LDF	69,617	53.08	Ebrahimkutty Kallar	DIC	UDF	49,969	38.10	19,648	14.98
86	Peermade	E. S. Bijimol	CPI	LDF	45,465	50.24	E. M. Augasthy	INC	UDF	40,161	44.38	5,304	5.86
87	Kanjirappally	Alphons Kannanthanam	IND	LDF	42,413	41.80	Joseph Vazhackan	INC	UDF	31,676	31.21	10,737	10.59
88	Vazhoor	Jayarajan	KC(M)	UDF	42,290	51.46	Rajendran P. Nair	CPI	LDF	35,624	43.35	6,666	8.11
89	Changanacherry	C. F. Thomas	KC(M)	UDF	50,435	52.11	A. V. Russel	CPM	LDF	40,782	42.14	9,653	9.97
90	Kottayam	V. N. Vasavan	CPM	LDF	47,731	47.55	Ajay Tharayil	INC	UDF	47,249	47.07	482	0.48
91	Ettumanoor	Thomas Chazhikkadan	KC(M)	UDF	48,789	50.34	K. S. Krishnankutty Nair	CPM	LDF	43,809	45.20	4,980	5.14
92	Puthuppally	Oommen Chandy	INC	UDF	64,910	56.30	Sindhu Joy	CPM	LDF	45,047	39.07	19,863	17.23
93	Poonjar	P. C. George	KC(S)	LDF	48,795	52.06	K. Abraham	KC(M)	LDF	41,158	43.91	7,637	8.15
94	Palai	K. M. Mani	KC(M)	UDF	46,608	51.54	Mani C. Kappan	NCP	LDF	38,849	42.96	7,759	8.58
95	Kaduthuruthy	Mons Joseph	KEC	LDF	44,958	48.33	Stephen George	KC(M)	LDF	42,957	46.17	2,001	2.16
96	Vaikom (SC)	K. Ajith	CPI	LDF	52,617	52.07	V. P. Sajeendran	INC	UDF	43,836	43.38	8,781	8.69
97	Aroor	A. M. Ariff	CPM	LDF	58,218	49.55	Gouri Amma	JSS	UDF	53,465	45.51	4,753	4.04
98	Sherthalai	P. Thilothaman	CPI	LDF	55,626	51.56	C. K. Shajimohan	INC	UDF	47,092	43.65	8,534	7.91
99	Mararikulam	Thomas Isaac	CPM	LDF	75,994	53.73	Simmi Rose Bell John	INC	UDF	58,315	41.23	17,679	12.50
100	Alleppey	K. C. Venugopal	INC	UDF	49,721	58.59	T. J. Anjalose	CPI	LDF	32,788	38.64	16,933	19.95
101	Ambalapuzha	G. Sudhakaran	CPM	LDF	50,040	53.27	D. Sugathan	DIC	UDF	38,111	40.57	11,929	12.70
102	Kuttanad	Thomas Chandy	DIC	UDF	42,109	50.45	K. C. Joseph	KEC	LDF	36,728	44.01	5,381	6.44
103	Haripad	B. Babuprasad	INC	UDF	53,787	48.90	T. K. Devakumar	CPM	LDF	51,901	47.18	1,886	1.72
104	Kayamkulam	C. K. Sadasivan	CPM	LDF	49,697	49.79	C. R. Jayaprakash	INC	UDF	43,865	43.94	5,832	5.85
105	Thiruvalla	Mathew T. Thomas	JD(S)	LDF	28,874	40.59	Victor Thomas	KC(M)	LDF	19,952	28.05	8,922	12.54
106	Kallooppara	Joseph Puthussery	KC(M)	UDF	36,088	50.22	Cherian Philip	IND	LDF	28,600	39.80	7,488	10.42
107	Aranmula	K. C. Rajagopalan	CPM	LDF	34,007	48.75	K. R. Rajappan	IND	None	19,387	27.79	14,620	20.96
108	Chengannur	P. C. Vishnunadh	INC	UDF	44,010	50.53	Saji Cherian	CPM	LDF	38,878	44.64	5,132	5.89
109	Mavelikara	M. Murali	INC	UDF	47,449	48.67	G. Rajamma	CPM	LDF	44,777	45.93	2,672	2.74
110	Pandalam (SC)	K. K. Shaju	JSS	UDF	51,196	45.96	K. Raghavan	CPM	LDF	49,891	44.79	1,305	1.17
111	Ranni	Raju Abraham	CPM	LDF	49,367	55.43	Peelipose Thomas	INC	UDF	34,396	38.62	14,971	16.81
112	Pathanamthitta	K. Sivadasan Nair	INC	UDF	33,043	40.67	V. K. Purushothaman Pillai	CPM	LDF	31,818	39.17	1,225	1.50
113	Konni	Adoor Prakash	INC	UDF	51,445	54.75	V. R. Sivarajan	CPM	LDF	36,550	38.90	14,895	15.85
114	Pathanapuram	K. B. Ganesh Kumar	KC(B)	UDF	55,554	53.48	K. R. Chandramohan	CPI	LDF	43,740	42.11	11,814	11.37
115	Punaloor	K. Raju	CPI	LDF	58,895	51.92	M. V. Raghavan	CMP	UDF	50,970	44.93	7,925	6.99
116	Chadayamangalam	M. Retnakaran	CPI	LDF	47,284	49.90	P. Gopalakrishnan	INC	UDF	42,631	44.99	4,653	4.91
117	Kottarakara	P. Aisha Potty	CPM	LDF	52,243	53.23	R. Balakrishna Pillai	KC(B)	UDF	40,156	40.92	12,087	12.31
118	Neduvathur (SC)	B. Raghavan	CPM	LDF	48,023	48.58	Ezhukone Narayanan	INC	UDF	46,868	47.41	1,155	1.17
119	Adoor	T. Radhakrishnan	INC	UDF	53,416	56.76	D. K. John	KEC	LDF	34,952	37.14	18,464	19.62
120	Kunnathur (SC)	Kovoor Kunjumon	RSP	LDF	65,011	56.62	P. Ramabhadran	INC	UDF	42,438	36.96	22,573	19.66
121	Karunagapally	C. Divakaran	CPI	LDF	53,287	52.12	A. N. Rajan Babu	JSS	UDF	40,791	39.90	12,496	12.22
122	Chavara	N. K. Premachandran	RSP	LDF	54,026	48.89	Shibu Baby John	IND	UDF	52,240	47.28	1,786	1.61
123	Kundara	M. A. Baby	CPM	LDF	50,320	55.01	Kadavoor Sivadasan	INC	UDF	35,451	38.75	14,869	16.26
124	Quilon	P. K. Gurudasan	CPM	LDF	44,662	54.68	Babu Divakaran	IND	UDF	33,223	40.67	11,439	14.01
125	Eravipuram	A. A. Aziz	RSP	LDF	64,234	55.70	K. M. Shaji	IUML	UDF	40,185	34.85	24,049	20.85
126	Chathanoor	N. Anirudhan	CPI	LDF	59,379	56.81	G. Prathapa Thampan	INC	UDF	36,199	34.63	23,180	22.18
127	Varkala	Varkala Kahar	INC	UDF	44,883	48.78	S. Sundaresan	CPM	LDF	43,258	47.02	1,625	1.76
128	Attingal	A. Anandan	CPM	LDF	42,912	53.75	C. Mohanachandran	INC	UDF	31,704	39.71	11,208	14.04
129	Kilimanoor (SC)	N. Rajan	CPI	LDF	52,042	57.57	Kavalloor Madhu	DIC	UDF	30,545	33.79	21,497	23.78
130	Vamanapuram	J. Arundhathi	CPM	LDF	45,743	47.26	S. Shine	JSS	UDF	39,234	40.53	6,509	6.73
131	Ariyanad	G. Karthikeyan Aryanad	INC	UDF	43,056	48.37	T. J. Chandrachoodan	RSP	LDF	40,858	45.90	2,198	2.47
132	Nedumangad	Mankode Radhakrishnan	CPI	LDF	58,674	47.81	Palode Ravi	INC	UDF	58,589	47.74	85	0.07
133	Kazhakuttam	M. A. Vaheed	INC	UDF	51,296	46.90	K. Surendran	CPM	LDF	51,081	46.70	215	0.20
134	Trivandrum North	M. Vijayakumar	CPM	LDF	60,145	50.61	K. Mohankumar	INC	UDF	50,421	42.43	9,724	8.18
135	Trivandrum West	V. Surendran Pillai	KEC	LDF	35,077	48.84	Shobhana George	DIC	UDF	21,844	30.42	13,233	18.42
136	Trivandrum East	V. Sivankutty	CPM	LDF	34,875	43.33	B. Vijayakumar	INC	UDF	32,599	40.50	2,276	2.83
137	Nemom	N. Sakthan	INC	UDF	60,884	50.74	Venganoor P. Bhaskaran	CPM	LDF	50,135	41.79	10,749	8.95
138	Kovalam	George Mercier	INC	UDF	38,764	36.45	Neelalohithadasan Nadar	IND	None	27,939	26.27	10,825	10.18
139	Neyyattinkara	V. J. Thankappan	CPM	LDF	50,351	47.32	Thampanoor Ravi	INC	UDF	49,605	46.61	746	0.71
140	Parassala	R. Selvaraj	CPM	LDF	49,297	50.38	N. Sundaran Nadar	INC	UDF	44,890	45.87	4,407	4.51
