= Neyyattinkara Assembly constituency =

Constituency of the Kerala legislative assembly in India

Neyyattinkara
- Constituency No. 140 for the Kerala Legislative Assembly

Constituency details
- Country: India
- Region: South India
- State: Kerala
- District: Thiruvananthapuram
- Established: 1957
- Total electors: 1,86,705 (2021)
- Reservation: None

Member of Legislative Assembly
- 16th Kerala Legislative Assembly
- Incumbent N. Sakthan
- Party: Indian National Congress
- Alliance: UDF
- Elected year: 2026

Neyyattinkara is one of the 140 state legislative assembly constituencies in Kerala in southern India. It is also one of the seven state legislative assembly constituencies included in Thiruvananthapuram Lok Sabha constituency. As of the 2026 Assembly elections, the current MLA is N. Sakthan of INC.

== Local self-governed segments ==
Neyyattinkara Assembly constituency is composed of the following local self-governed segments:

Sl no.	Name	Status (Grama panchayat/Municipality)	Taluk
1	Neyyattinkara	Municipality	Neyyattinkara
2	Athiyannur	Grama panchayat	Neyyattinkara
3	Chenkal	Grama panchayat	Neyyattinkara
4	Karode	Grama panchayat	Neyyattinkara
5	Kulathoor	Grama panchayat	Neyyattinkara
6	Thirupuram	Grama panchayat	Neyyattinkara

== Members of the Legislative Assembly ==
The following list contains all members of Kerala Legislative Assembly who have represented the constituency:

Election	Name	Party
1957	Ottasekharamangalam Janardhanan Nair	Communist Party of India
1960	P. Narayanan Thampi	Praja Socialist Party
1967	R. G. Nair	Indian National Congress
1970	R. Parameshwaran Pillai	Communist Party of India (Marxist)
1977	R. Sundareshwaran Nair	Independent
1980	R. Sundareshwaran Nair	Independent
1982	S. R. Thankaraj	Janata Party
1987	S. R. Thankaraj	Janata Party
1991	Thampanoor Ravi	Indian National Congress
1996	Thampanoor Ravi	Indian National Congress
2001	Thampanoor Ravi	Indian National Congress
2006	V. J. Thankappan	Communist Party of India (Marxist)
2011	R. Selvaraj	Communist Party of India (Marxist)
2012^	R. Selvaraj	Indian National Congress
2016	K. Ansalan	Communist Party of India (Marxist)
2021	K. Ansalan	Communist Party of India (Marxist)
2026	N. Sakthan	Indian National Congress

== Election results ==
Percentage change (±) denotes the change in the number of votes from the previous election.

=== 2026 ===
2026 Kerala Legislative Assembly election: Neyyattinkara
Party	Candidate	Votes	%	±%
INC	N. Sakthan	58,760	43.98	
CPI(M)	K. Ansalan	51,794	38.76	
NDA	S. Rajasekharan Nair	21,858	16.36	
NOTA	None of the above	720	0.54	
BSP	Surendranathan. K	327	0.24	
Independent	Bipin S.B	157	0.12	
Margin of victory		6966		
Turnout		133616		
INC gain from CPI(M)		Swing		

=== 2021 ===
2021 Kerala Legislative Assembly election: Neyyattinkara
Party	Candidate	Votes	%	±%
CPI(M)	K. Ansalan	65,497	47.02	▼0.18
INC	R. Selvaraj	51,235	36.78	▼3.34
BJP	Rajasekharan S Nair	21,009	15.08	▲7.55
NOTA	None of the above	907	0.65	
Margin of victory		14,642	10.24	▲3.16
Turnout				
CPI(M) hold		Swing		

=== 2016 ===
There were 1,78,942 registered voters in the constituency for the 2016 Kerala Assembly election.

2016 Kerala Legislative Assembly election: Neyyattinkara
Party	Candidate	Votes	%	±%
CPI(M)	K. Ansalan	62,113	47.20	▲12.06
INC	R. Selvaraj	59,016	40.12	▲6.16
BJP	Punchakiri Surendran	15,531	11.53	▼11.68
NOTA	None of the above	693	0.51	
BSP	Prabhakaran	566	0.42	
Independent	Anilkumar	280	0.21	
Margin of victory		9,543	7.08	
Turnout		1,34,645	75.25	▼4.48
CPI(M) gain from INC		Swing		

=== 2012 by-election ===
Due to the resignation of sitting CPI(M) MLA R. Selvaraj, Neyyatinkara Assembly constituency held a by-election on June 6, 2012. There were 1,64,856 registered voters in the constituency for this election. R. Selvaraj, now contesting for INC, won the election by a margin of 6,334 votes.

2012 by election: Neyyattinkara
Party	Candidate	Votes	%	±%
INC	R. Selvaraj	52,528	39.96	▼3.02
CPI(M)	F. Lawrence	46,194	35.14	▼13.84
BJP	O. Rajagopal	30,507	23.21	▲17.18
Margin of victory		6,334	4.82	
Turnout		1,34,645	79.73	▲8.97
INC gain from CPI(M)		Swing		

=== 2011 ===
There were 1,57,851 registered voters in the constituency for the 2011 election.

2011 Kerala Legislative Assembly election: Neyyattinkara
Party	Candidate	Votes	%	±%
CPI(M)	R. Selvaraj	54,711	48.98	
INC	Thampanoor Ravi	48,009	42.98	
BJP	Athiyannoor Sreekumar	6,730	6.03	
Margin of victory		6,702	6.00	
Turnout		1,11,698	70.76	
CPI(M) hold		Swing		

=== 2006 ===
2006 Kerala Legislative Assembly election: Neyyattinkara
Party	Candidate	Votes	%	±%
CPI(M)	V J Thankappan	50,351	47.31	
INC	Thampanoor Ravi	49,605	46.61	
Margin of victory		746	0.70	
Turnout		1,06,415		
CPI(M) gain from INC		Swing		

=== 2001 ===
2001 Kerala Legislative Assembly election: Neyyattinkara
Party	Candidate	Votes	%	±%
INC	Thampanoor Ravi	56,305	50.0	
JD(S)	S. B. Rosechandran	49,830	44.3	
Margin of victory		6,475	5.7	
Turnout		1,12,607	67.2	
INC hold		Swing		

=== 1996 ===
1996 Kerala Legislative Assembly election: Neyyattinkara
Party	Candidate	Votes	%	±%
INC	Thampanoor Ravi	50,924	49.39	
JD	Charupara Ravi	36,500	35.39	
Margin of victory		14,424	14	
Turnout		1,03,132	67.48	
INC hold		Swing		

=== 1991 ===
1991 Kerala Legislative Assembly election: Neyyattinkara
Party	Candidate	Votes	%	±%
INC	Thampanoor Ravi	49,106	47.05	
JD	S. R. Thankaraj	47,042	45.15	
Margin of victory		1,974	1.90	
Turnout		1,04,187	72.26	
INC gain from JD		Swing		

=== 1987 ===
1987 Kerala Legislative Assembly election: Neyyattinkara
Party	Candidate	Votes	%	±%
JP	S. R. Thankaraj	45,212	47.37	
INC	K. C. Thankaraj	32,148	33.68	
Margin of victory		13,064	13.69	
Turnout		95,449	77.41	
JP hold		Swing		

=== 1982 ===
1982 Kerala Legislative Assembly election: Neyyattinkara
Party	Candidate	Votes	%	±%
JP	S. R. Thankaraj	43,159	60.40	
NDP	R. Sundaresan Nair	28,179	39.44	
Margin of victory		14,980	20.96	
Turnout		71,456	73.76	
JP gain from Independent		Swing		

=== 1980 ===
1980 Kerala Legislative Assembly election: Neyyattinkara
Party	Candidate	Votes	%	±%
Independent	R. Sundaresan Nair	39,975	56.52	
CPI(M)	R. Parameswaran Pillai	30,331	42.89	
Margin of victory		9,644	13.63	
Turnout		70,725	71.43	
Independent hold		Swing		

=== 1977 ===
1977 Kerala Legislative Assembly election: Neyyattinkara
Party	Candidate	Votes	%	±%
Independent	R. Sundaresan Nair	30,372	48.92	
CPI(M)	R. Parameswaran Pillai	24,678	39.75	
Margin of victory		5,694	9.17	
Turnout		62,088	75.82	
Independent gain from CPI(M)		Swing		

=== 1970 ===
1970 Kerala Legislative Assembly election: Neyyattinkara
Party	Candidate	Votes	%	±%
CPI(M)	R. Parameswaran Pillai	23,406	42.57	
CPI	R. Janardhanan Nair	16,514	30.04	
INC(O)	R. Gopalakrishnan Nair	13,037	23.71	
Margin of victory		6,892	12.53	
Turnout		54,978	72.70	
CPI(M) gain from INC		Swing		

=== 1967 ===
1967 Kerala Legislative Assembly election: Neyyattinkara
Party	Candidate	Votes	%	±%
INC	R. Gopalakrishnan Nair	24,038	51.28	
CPI(M)	M. Sathyanesan	22,839	48.72	
Margin of victory		1,199	2.56	
Turnout		46,877	75.77	
INC hold		Swing		

== See also ==
- Neyyattinkara
- Thiruvananthapuram district
- List of constituencies of the Kerala Legislative Assembly
- 2016 Kerala Legislative Assembly election
