= Kunhiraman =

Kunhiraman may refer to:

- C. V. Kunhiraman (born 1871), Indian social reformer
- Kanayi Kunhiraman (born 1937), Indian sculptor
- K. Kunhiraman (born 1948), Indian politician
- Kunhiraman Palat Candeth (born 1916), Indian army general
- Vengayil Kunhiraman Nayanar (born 1860), Indian essayist
- P. Kunhiraman Nair (born 1905), Indian writer
- K. V. Kunhiraman (born 1961), Indian politician
- K. Kunhiraman (born 1943), Indian politician
- Chemancheri Kunhiraman Nair (born 1916), Indian actor
- P. M. Kunhiraman Nambiar (born 1905), Indian freedom fighter
