= M. Sathyanesan =

Indian politician (1934–2009)

Member of the Kerala Legislative Assembly
- In office 1970–1977
- Preceded by: N. Gamaliel
- Succeeded by: M. Kunjukrishnan Nadar
- Constituency: Parassala

Personal details
- Born: 9 September 1934
- Died: 2009

Manuel Sathyanesan (9 September 1934 – 2009) was an Indian politician, who belonged to the Communist Party of India (Marxist). He represented Parassala in the fourth, fifth and eighth Kerala Legislative Assembly.

He has also held other positions such as chairman of the Committee on Private Members' Bills and Resolutions in 1989. He was also the president of the Kollayil Panchayat for 16 Years and was a state committee member of the All India Kisan Sabha. Sathyanesan also served as the secretary of the CPI (M) district committee.
