= Administration of Neyyattinkara =

Local government in Kerala, India

Neyyattinkara taluk is a taluk in Trivandrum and Attingal in the Indian state of Kerala.

Neyyattinkara taluk includes 4 assembly constituencies (Kattakada, Neyyattinkara, Parassala, Kovalam). In early 2012, Neyyattinkara constituency attracted statewide attention over a fiercely contested by-election caused by the resignation of the MLA R. Selvaraj. The contest was between O. Rajagopal of BJP, F. Lawrence of CPI(M) and Selvaraj (Now, of INC), with Selvaraj emerging as the ultimate winner.

Shashi Tharoor (Indian National Congress party) WAS re-elected as MP on 20 April 2014.

Neyyattinkara MLA: K. A. Ansalan, (Communist Party of India (Marxist) party.

Kattakada MLA: N. Sakthan, (Indian National Congress party, Deputy Speaker)

Neyyattinkara Municipality led by LDF COM. WR Heeba CPI(M) district committee member elected as chairperson and Com. KK Shibu CPI(M) Vice chairman.

Parassala MLA: A.T. George, (Indian National Congress party)

Kovalam MLA: Jameela Prakasam, (Janata Dal (Secular))

== Elections ==
=== 2014 ===
In the 2014 Parliament Election (held on 2014-04-20) Dr. Shashi Tharoor (UDF) got maximum number of votes from Neyyattinkara Constituency i.e., Neyyattinkara – UDF – 48,009, BJP – 28958, LDF – 39806; Dr. Tharoor got an additional 19,051 votes against BJP from Neyyattinkara Constituency alone that resulted in his ultimate success against BJP. Finally, he won the election with 14,501 votes. The election results of other constituencies in this regard are: Parassala – UDF – 50360, BJP – 39753, LDF – 47953; Kovalam – UDF – 51401, BJP – 36169, LDF – 42112; Nemom – UDF – 32639, BJP – 50685, LDF – 31643; Thiruvananthapuram – UDF – 39027, BJP 40835, LDF – 27385; Vattiyoorkavu – UDF – 40663, BJP – 43589 – LDF, 27504; Kazhakoottam – UDF 34220, BJP – 41,829, LDF - 31799

=== 2015 ===
Sl.No.	Name of Ward	Political Party	Elected Councillor	Result
1.	Aalampotta	UDF	G Sukumari	Won 443 votes against J S Kumari Kavitha
2.	Aalummoodu	BJP	N Usha Kumari	Won 320 votes against Rajambika Devi S
3.	Aaralummoodu	UDF	A Salim	Won 500 votes against M Shanavas
4.	Amaravila	BJP	Shibu Raj Krishna M	Won 372 votes against S Sudevakumar
5.	Athazhamangalam	LDF	Soumya D	Won 629 votes against T Kala
6.	Athiyannoor	Others	S S Jayakumar	Won 478 votes against Muraleedharan Nair T
7.	Brahmamkode	Others	Geetha S	Won 287 votes against Resmi N S
8.	Chaikkottukonam	UDF	N Nirmala Bai	Won 372 votes against Ambili
9.	Chundavila	LDF	Sathya Raj S	Won 371 votes against Raju S
10.	Elavanikkara	LDF	S Sathi Kumar (Saji)	Won 356 votes against Pushpaleela
11.	Fort	UDF	R Ajitha	Won 372 votes against Maya N S
12.	Irumbil	LDF	Shyamala K	Won 512 votes against Christilda Baby
13.	Kalathuvila	LDF	P Murukan	Won 595 votes against V Padma Kumar
14.	Kavalakulam	LDF	K K Shibu	Won 666 votes against C S Bright Kumar
15.	Kollavamvila	Others	Jojin	Won 780 votes against Vincent D S
16.	Koottappana	UDF	Lalitha Teacher	Won 328 votes against K Sreelatha
17.	Krishnapuram	UDF	Sajitha	Won 375 votes against Shalini C B
18.	Kulathamal	LDF	Sunil Kumar	Won 425 votes against Isantobert
19.	Mambazhakkara	LDF	Jayadaly M V	Won 570 votes against Shobha S
20.	Manaloor	LDF	C Surendran	Won 528 votes against Sajinlal S P
21.	Maruthathur	LDF	Joly J	Won 426 votes against T Ashalatha
22.	Moonnukallinmoodu	LDF	L Usha	Won 515 votes against Jayasree(Moly)
23.	Mullaravila	BJP	S S Swapna Jith	Won 442 votes against R O Arun
24.	Muttakkadu	UDF	Jyothi Varghese	Won 491 votes against Nancy B
25.	Narayanapuram	LDF	Mary Fathima A	Won 741 votes against Vasantha P
26.	Nilamel	BJP	V Harikumar	Won 360 votes against Vaisakh J S
27.	Olathanni	UDF	Sunitha	Won 512 votes against R V Vijaya Bose
28.	Ooruttukaala	LDF	K P Sreekandan Nair	Won 477 votes against N K Sasi
29.	Pallivilakaom	LDF	Jayaseeli K C	Won 563 votes against G M Krishna Kumari (Thanki)
30.	Panangattukari	UDF	Suresh Kumar	Won 514 votes against C S Chandra Kiran
31.	Perumpazhuthur	UDF	Aswathy V S	Won 404 votes against Laila L
32.	Pirayummoodu	LDF	Anitha Kumari N K	Won 666 votes against J L Ranjit Sumanam
33.	Plavila	LDF	Kala Mankeshkar C S	Won 564 votes against H Prasanna
34.	Pullamala	LDF	G Babu Raj	Won 409 votes against Chandrakumar M C
35.	Punnaykkadu	Others	C Saju	Won 472 votes against G Siva Kumar
36.	Puthanambalam	Others	Anitha	Won 360 votes against Anitha R
37.	Rameswaram	LDF	W R Heeba	Won 380 votes against Vijitha K M
38.	Thavaravila	BJP	V N Sasikala	Won 388 votes against Preetha C V
39.	Thozhukkal	Others	R Vijayan	Won 328 votes against P Rajan
40.	Town	LDF	Ali Fathummal M	Won 456 votes against A Maheen
41.	Vadakode	LDF	V Sudha	Won 422 votes against S Mayadevi
42.	Vazhimukku	LDF	Shamila S	Won 580 votes against Shemeela M
43.	Vazhuthur	UDF	L S Sheela	Won 724 votes against C D Justin Jose
44.	Vlangamuri	UDF	Gramam Praveen	Won 661 votes against S Mohana Kumar
