= A. K. Chandran =

Indian politician

Member of the Kerala Legislative Assembly
- In office 2006–2011
- Preceded by: T. U. Radhakrishnan
- Succeeded by: Constituency abolished
- Constituency: Mala

Personal details
- Born: 10 June 1946 (age 79)
- Party: Communist Party of India

A. K. Chandran (10 June 1946) was an Indian politician and leader of the Communist Party of India (CPI). He represented the Mala constituency in the twelfth Kerala Legislative Assembly elected in the 2006 Kerala Legislative Assembly election.
