= N. A. Nellikkunnu =

Indian politician

Member of the Kerala Legislative Assembly
- In office 2011–2026
- Preceded by: C. T. Ahammed Ali
- Succeeded by: Kallatra Mahin
- Constituency: Kasaragod

Personal details
- Born: 18 March 1954 (age 72) Nellikunnu
- Spouse: Aysha T. M.
- Children: Two daughters and one son

Nellikunnu Abdul Khader Mohammed Kunhi, popularly known as N. A. Nellikkunnu is a politician from Indian Union Muslim League who served as a member of the 13th, 14th and 15th Legislative Assembly of Kerala. He represented the Kasaragod assembly constituency.

== Career ==
Nellikkunnu entered politics through Muslim Students' Federation and later became the secretary of its Kasaragod Government College unit. He was also the Secretary of Kasaragod Taluk Committee, and Muslim Youth League, Kasaragod. He is a state council member of Muslim League, and General Secretary of Muslim League Municipal Committee, Kasaragod.

He was also first Correspondent of Chandrika Daily in U.A.E. and the founding Secretary of Chandrika Readers Forum, Dubai.

He is currently a working committee member of I.U.M.L State Committee, President of Agriculturist Welfare Co-operative Society, Kasaragod; and the Manager of Anvarul Uloom A.U.P. School, Nellikkunnu, Kasaragod.
