= Kasaragod Assembly constituency =

Constituency of the Kerala legislative assembly in India

Kasargod
- Constituency No. 2 for the Kerala Legislative Assembly
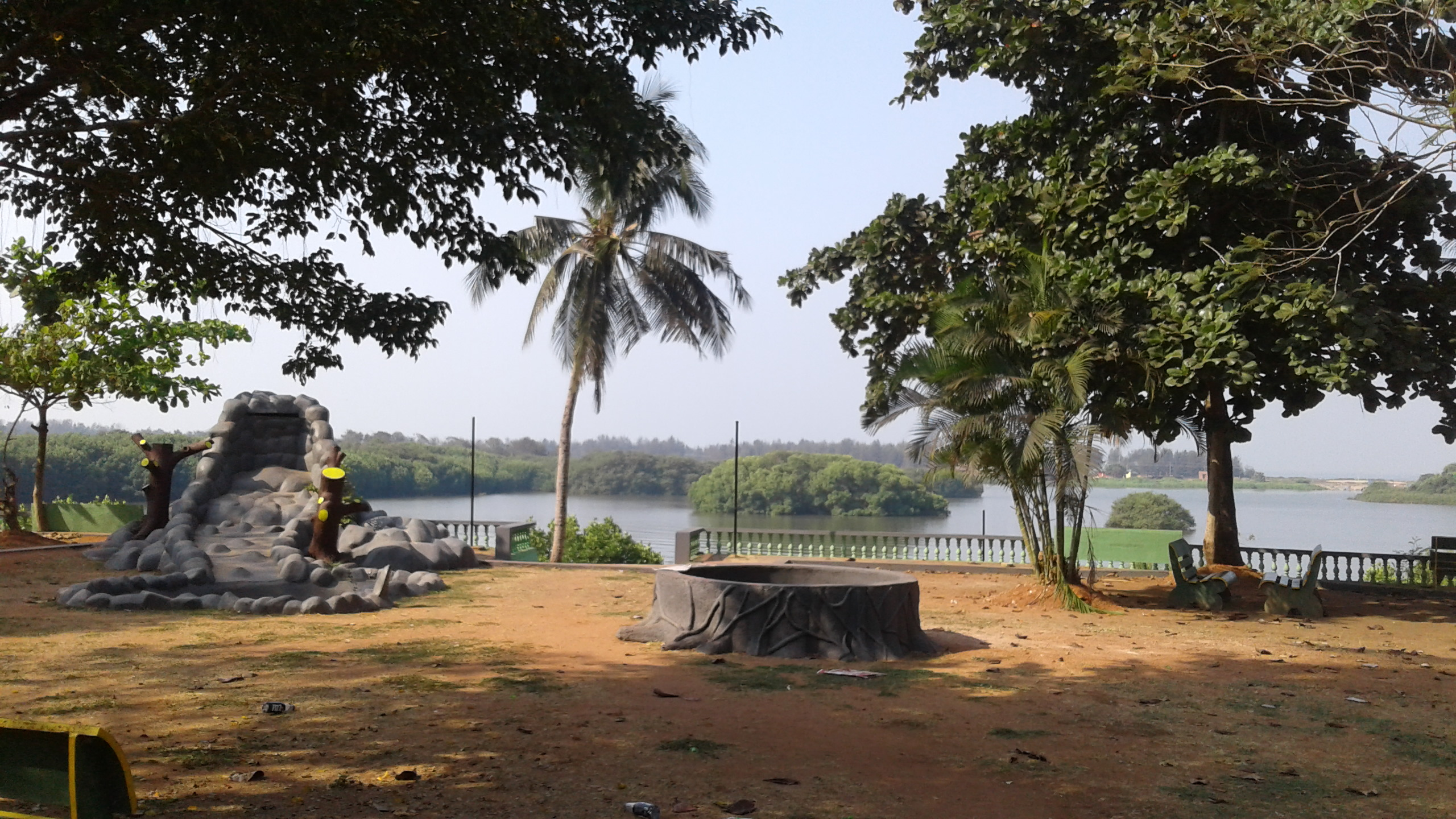
- Seaview Park near Kasaragod Railway Station

Constituency details
- Country: India
- Region: South India
- State: Kerala
- District: Kasaragod
- Established: 1957
- Total electors: 2,01,812 (2021)
- Reservation: None

Member of Legislative Assembly
- 16th Kerala Legislative Assembly
- Incumbent Kallatra Mahin
- Party: IUML
- Alliance: UDF
- Elected year: 2026

Kasaragod State assembly constituency is one of the 140 state legislative assembly constituencies in Kerala in southern India. It is also one of the seven state legislative assembly constituencies included in Kasaragod Lok Sabha constituency. As of the 2026 assembly elections, the current MLA is Kallatra Mahin of IUML.

== Local self-governed segments ==
Kasaragod Assembly constituency is composed of the following local self-governed segments:

Kasaragod (State Assembly constituency)

Sl no.	Name	Status (Grama panchayat/Municipality)	Taluk
1	Kasaragod	Municipality	Kasaragod
2	Badiyadka	Grama panchayat	Kasaragod
3	Bellur	Grama panchayat	Kasaragod
4	Chengala	Grama panchayat	Kasaragod
5	Karadka	Grama panchayat	Kasaragod
6	Kumbadaje	Grama panchayat	Kasaragod
7	Madhur	Grama panchayat	Kasaragod
8	Mogral Puthur	Grama panchayat	Kasaragod

== Members of the Legislative Assembly ==
Election	Name	Party
1952	M. S. Mogral	Indian National Congress
1957	Kunhikrishnan Nair Cheripady	Indian National Congress
1960	M. Kunhikkannan Nambiar	Indian National Congress
1965	E. Abdul Khader	Independent
1967	U. P. Kunikullaya	Independent
1970	B. M. Abdurahman	Independent
1977	T. A. Ibrahim	Indian Union Muslim League
1980	C. T. Ahammed Ali	Indian Union Muslim League
1982	C. T. Ahammed Ali	Indian Union Muslim League
1987	C. T. Ahammed Ali	Indian Union Muslim League
1991	C. T. Ahammed Ali	Indian Union Muslim League
1996	C. T. Ahammed Ali	Indian Union Muslim League
2001	C. T. Ahammed Ali	Indian Union Muslim League
2006	C. T. Ahammed Ali	Indian Union Muslim League
2011	N. A. Nellikkunnu	Indian Union Muslim League
2016	N. A. Nellikkunnu	Indian Union Muslim League
2021	N. A. Nellikkunnu	Indian Union Muslim League
2026	Kallatra Mahin	Indian Union Muslim League

== Election results ==
=== 2026 ===
2026 Kerala Legislative Assembly election: Kasaragod
Party	Candidate	Votes	%	±%
IUML	Kallatra Mahin	76,396	45.39	▲1.59
BJP	M. L. Ashwini	53,698	31.90	▼2.98
LDF	Shanavas Padhoor	36,678	21.79	▲2.19
Independent	Shahnavas A. A.	893	0.53	
Independent	Fathah Bangara	824	0.49	
NOTA	None of the above	714	0.42	▼0.02
Margin of victory		22,698	13.49	▲4.57
Turnout		1,69,203	79.90	▲9.03
IUML hold		Swing	▲1.59	

By local self-governed segment:

Status (Gram panchayat)	Votes			Lead
Status (Gram panchayat)	Kallatra Mahin	M. L. Ashwini	Shanavas Padhoor	Lead
Mogral Puthur	8,235	4,624	3,426	3,611
Madhur	11,350	12,345	5,713	995
Badiyadka	7,607	9,223	3,256	1,616
Kumbadaje	3,296	4,123	2,120	827
Bellur	1,391	3,215	1,540	1,675
Chengala	23,290	4,544	10,905	12,385
Kasaragod	16,100	9,407	5,951	6,693
Karadka	4,711	5,655	3,508	944
Postal Ballots	416	562	259	146

=== 2021 ===
There were 2,01,812 eligible voters in Kasaragod Assembly constituency for the 2021 Kerala Assembly election.

2021 Kerala Legislative Assembly election: Kasaragod
Party	Candidate	Votes	%	±%
IUML	N. A. Nellikkunnu	63,296	43.80	▼0.92
BJP	K. Shreekanth	50,395	34.88	▼3.89
INL	M. A. Latheef	28,323	19.60	▲4.67
BSP	Vijaya K. P.	679	0.47	▲0.07
NOTA	None Of the Above	639	0.44	▼0.02
Anna DHRM	Ranjit Raj M.	555	0.38	−
Independent	Nishanth Kumar I. B.	417	0.29	−
Independent	Sudhakaran K.	196	0.14	−
Margin of victory		12,901	8.92	▲2.97
Turnout		1,43,032	70.87	▲3.15
IUML hold		Swing	▼0.92	

=== 2016 ===
There were 1,88,906 eligible voters in Kasaragod Assembly constituency for the 2016 Kerala Assembly election.

2016 Kerala Legislative Assembly election: Kasaragod
Party	Candidate	Votes	%	±%
IUML	N. A. Nellikkunnu	64,727	44.72	▼0.63
BJP	Ravisha Thantri Kuntar	56,120	38.77	▲1.75
INL	A. A. Ameen	21,615	14.93	▲0.86
NOTA	None Of the Above	661	0.46	−
BSP	Vijaykumar B.	585	0.4	▼0.29
Independent	Roshan Kumar	508	0.35	−
Independent	A. Damodaran	283	0.20	−
Independent	Muneer Munnambam	250	0.17	−
Margin of victory		8,607	5.95	▼2.38
Turnout		1,44,749	76.62	▲3.15
IUML hold		Swing	▼0.63	

=== 2011 ===
There were 1,59,289 eligible voters in Kasaragod Assembly constituency for the 2011 Kerala Assembly election.

2011 Kerala Legislative Assembly election: Kasaragod
Party	Candidate	Votes	%	±%
IUML	N. A. Nellikkunnu	53,068	45.35	
BJP	Jayalakshmi N. Bhatt	43,330	37.02	
INL	Azeez Kadappuram	16,467	14.07	
SDPI	A. H. Muneer	1260	1.08	
Independent	Govinda Raja Kuntikkanamata	938	0.80	
BSP	Saifudeen K. Makkodu	807	0.69	
Independent	Ajith Kumar Azad	739	0.63	
Independent	Abdulla	422	0.36	
Margin of victory		9,738	8.32	
Turnout		1,17,031	73.47	
IUML hold		Swing		

=== 1952 ===
1952 Madras Legislative Assembly election: Kasargod
Party	Candidate	Votes	%	±%
INC	M. S. Mogral	19,258	47.26%	
KMPP	B. K. Sridharan	11,450	28.10%	
IUML	Mahin Sehammad	8,855	21.73%	
Socialist	K. Shankara	1,184	2.91%	
Margin of victory		7,808	19.16%	
Turnout		40,747	58.78%	
Registered electors		69,324		
INC win (new seat)				

=== 1957-2006 ===
Election	Votes polled	Winner				Runner-up 1				Runner-up 2				Margin of victory	
Year		Name	Party	Votes		Name	Party	Votes		Name	Party	Votes		Votes	Percent
2006	100179 (65.19%)	C. T. Ahammed Ali	IUML	38774	38.70%	V. Ravindran	BJP	28432	28.38%	N. A. Nellikkunnu	INL	27790	27.74%	10342	10.32%
2001	109438 (68.90%)	C. T. Ahammed Ali	IUML	51890	47.41%	P. K. Krishnadas	BJP	33895	30.97%	A. G. Nair	CPI(M)	21948	20.06%	17995	16.44%
1996	91629 (67.38%)	C. T. Ahammed Ali	IUML	33932	37.03%	K. Madhava Herala	BJP	30149	32.90%	N. A. Nellikkunnu	Ind.	24254	26.47%	3783	4.13%
1991	85436 (66.61%)	C. T. Ahammed Ali	IUML	39143	45.82%	Sri Krishna Bhat	BJP	24269	28.41%	T. V. Gangadharan	CPI(M)	21190	24.80%	14874	17.41%
1987	86600 (81.19%)	C. T. Ahammed Ali	IUML	41407	47.81%	Sri Krishna Bhat	BJP	27350	31.58%	M. Ramanna Rai	CPI(M)	17049	19.69%	14057	16.23%
1982	59692 (74.40%)	C. T. Ahammed Ali	IUML	25676	43.01%	N. Narayana Bhat	BJP	17657	29.58%	B. M. Abdurahman	ML(O)	15643	26.21%	8019	13.43%
1980	51401 (64.11%)	C. T. Ahammed Ali	IUML	30793	59.91%	Gorvacis Areeckal	KEC	14113	27.46%	Kayyar Kinhanna Rai	Ind.	5742	11.17%	16680	32.45%
1977	53964 (79.04%)	T. A. Ibrahim	IUML	29402	54.48%	B. M. Abdurahman	ML(O)	22619	41.91%	M. A. Abdulla Mallath	Ind.	1201	2.23%	6783	12.57%
Major delimitation of constituency
1970	59911 (80.02%)	B. M. Abdurahman	Ind.	27113	45.26%	K. P. Ballakuraya	Ind.	18736	31.27%	N. Ramanna Rai	CPI(M)	14062	23.47%	8377	13.99%
1967	45904 (78.21%)	U. P. Kunikullaya	Ind.	20635	44.95%	H. A. Schemnad	IUML	20540	44.75%	V. K. S. Nair	INC	4729	10.30%	95	0.20%
1965	46262 (75.89%)	E. Abdul Khader	Ind.	21923	47.39%	K. A. Shetty	INC	19784	42.77%	B. V. Kunhambu	CPI	2335	5.05%	2139	4.62%
Major delimitation of constituency
1960	48809 (79.24%)	M. Kunhikkannan Nambiar	INC	19399	39.74%	Anantharama Chetty	Ind.	15747	32.26%	Ambu Nair	CPI	13663	27.99%	3652	7.48%
1957	26,865 (41.56%)	Kunhikrishnan Nair Cheripady	INC	10,290	38.30%	Narayanan Nambiar	PSP	10,096	37.58%	Ganspathy Kamath N.	CPI	6479	24.12%	194	0.72%
Madras State

== See also ==
- Kasaragod
- Kasaragod district
- List of constituencies of the Kerala Legislative Assembly
- 2016 Kerala Legislative Assembly election
