= Bellur (Kasaragod) =

Belur
- Village
- Location in Kerala, India
- Coordinates: 12.5847°N 75.1714°E
- Country: India
- State: Kerala
- District: Kasaragod

Government
  - Type: Panchayati Raj (India)
  - Body: Kodom-Belur Grama Panchayat

Area
  - Total: 8.9 km^{2} (3.4 sq mi)

Population (2011)
  - Total: 3,936
  - Density: 440/km^{2} (1,100/sq mi)

Languages
  - Official: Malayalam, English
- Time zone: UTC+5:30 (IST)
- PIN: 671543
- Vehicle registration: KL-14

Belur is a Village and a Grama Panchayat in Kasaragod district in the state of Kerala, India.

== Demographics ==
As of 2011 Census, Belur village had a population of 3,936 with 1,929 males and 2,007 females. Belur village has an area of 8.9 km^{2} (3.4 sq mi) with 773 families residing in it. In Belur, 12.27% of the population was under 6 years of age. Belur had an average literacy of 84.74% higher than the national average of 74% and lower than the state average of 94%: male literacy was 89.76% and female literacy was 79.93%.

Belur Grama Panchayat had total population of 10,241 with 5,112 males and 5,129 females. Belur Panchayat has administration over the villages of Belur and Nettanige. 10.68% of the population in Belur Panchayat was under 6 years of age.

== Administration ==
Belur Grama Panchayat is part of Kasaragod (State Assembly constituency) under Kasaragod Loksabha constituency.
