= Parassala Assembly constituency =

State assembly constituency of Kerala, India

Parassala
- Constituency No. 137 for the Kerala Legislative Assembly

Constituency details
- Country: India
- Region: South India
- State: Kerala
- District: Thiruvananthapuram
- Established: 1957
- Total electors: 2,19,131 (2021)
- Reservation: None

Member of Legislative Assembly
- 16th Kerala Legislative Assembly
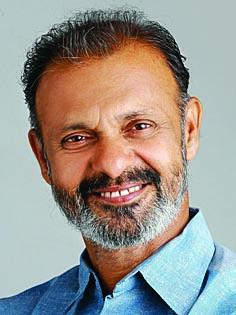
- Incumbent C. K. Hareendran
- Party: CPI(M)
- Alliance: LDF
- Elected year: 2026

Parassala is one of the 140 state legislative assembly constituencies in Kerala in southern India. It is also one of the seven state legislative assembly constituencies included in Thiruvananthapuram Lok Sabha constituency. As of the 2026 Assembly elections, C. K. Hareendran of CPI(M) is elected as MLA.

== Local self-governed segments ==
Parassala Assembly constituency is composed of the following local self-governed segments:

Sl no.	Name	Status (Grama panchayat/Municipality)	Taluk
1	Kollayil	Grama panchayat	Neyyattinkara
2	Kunnathukal	Grama panchayat	Neyyattinkara
3	Parassala	Grama panchayat	Neyyattinkara
4	Perumkadavila	Grama panchayat	Neyyattinkara
5	Vellarada	Grama panchayat	Neyyattinkara
6	Amboori	Grama panchayat	Kattakada
7	Aryancode	Grama panchayat	Kattakada
8	Kallikkad	Grama panchayat	Kattakada
9	Ottasekharamangalam	Grama panchayat	Kattakada

== Members of the Legislative Assembly ==
The following list contains all members of Kerala Legislative Assembly who have represented the constituency:

Election	Name	Party
1957	M. Kunjukrishnan Nadar	Indian National Congress
1960	M. Kunjukrishnan Nadar	Independent
1967	N. Gamaliel	Indian National Congress
1970	M. Sathyaneshan	Communist Party of India (Marxist)
1977	M. Kunjukrishnan Nadar	Indian National Congress
1979*	M. Sathyaneshan	Communist Party of India (Marxist)
1980	N. Sundaran Nadar	Indian National Congress (Indira)
1982	N. Sundaran Nadar	Indian National Congress
1987	M. Sathyaneshan	Communist Party of India (Marxist)
1991	M. R. Raghu Chandra Bal	Indian National Congress
1996	N. Sundaran Nadar	Independent
2001	N. Sundaran Nadar	Indian National Congress
2006	R. Selvaraj	Communist Party of India (Marxist)
2011	A. T. George	Indian National Congress
2016	C. K. Hareendran	Communist Party of India (Marxist)
2021	C. K. Hareendran	Communist Party of India (Marxist)
2026	C. K. Hareendran	Communist Party of India (Marxist)

== Election results ==
Percentage change (±%) denotes the change in the number of votes from the immediate previous election.

=== 2026 ===
2026 Kerala Legislative Assembly election: Parassala
Party	Candidate	Votes	%	±%
CPI(M)	C. K. Hareendran	69,149	44.61	▼3.55
INC	Neyyatinkara Sanal	54,136	34.92	▲2.59
NDA	Adv. Gireesh Neyyar	29919	19.30	▲1.0
NOTA	None of the above	632	0.41	
BSP	Adv. Dhanuvachapuram Thankachan	340	0.22	
AAP	Deepumon N	298	0.19	
Margin of victory		15,013	9.68	▼6.15
Turnout		1,55,008		
CPI(M) hold		Swing		

=== 2021 ===
2021 Kerala Legislative Assembly election: Parassala
Party	Candidate	Votes	%	±%
CPI(M)	C. K. Hareendran	78,548	48.16	▲3.75
INC	Ansajitha Russal	52,720	32.33	▼0.33
BJP	Karamana Jayan	29,850	18.3	▼2.61
NOTA	None of the above	630	0.49	
Margin of victory		25,828		
Turnout		1,63,090		
CPI(M) hold		Swing		

=== 2016 ===
There were 2,10,162 registered voters in the constituency for the 2016 Kerala Assembly election.

2016 Kerala Legislative Assembly election: Parassala
Party	Candidate	Votes	%	±%
CPI(M)	C. K. Hareendran	70,516	44.41	▼0.02
INC	A. T. George	51,590	32.66	▼12.14
BJP	Karamana Jayan	33,028	20.91	▲13.28
Margin of victory		18,566	11.75	
Turnout		1,57,980	75.17	▲3.42
CPI(M) gain from INC		Swing		

=== 2011 ===
There were 1,88,442 registered voters in the constituency for the 2011 election.

2011 Kerala Legislative Assembly election: Parassala
Party	Candidate	Votes	%	±%
INC	A. T. George	60,578	44.80	
CPI(M)	Anavoor Nagappan	60,073	44.43	
BJP	S. Suresh	10,310	7.63	
BSP	J. Sudhakaran	2,269	1.68	
Independent	T. K. Viswambharan	1,207	0.89	
Margin of victory		505	0.37	
Turnout		1,35,211	71.75	▲6.61
INC gain from CPI(M)		Swing		

=== 2006 ===
2006 Kerala Legislative Assembly election: Parassala
Party	Candidate	Votes	%	±%
CPI(M)	R. Selvaraj	49,297	50.37	
INC	N Sundaran Nadar	44,890	45.87	
Margin of victory		4,407	4.50	
Turnout		97,859		
CPI(M) gain from INC		Swing		

=== 2001 ===
There were 1,59,833 registered voters in the constituency for the 2001 election.

2001 Kerala Legislative Assembly election: Parassala
Party	Candidate	Votes	%	±%
INC	N Sundaran Nadar	55,915	53.18	
CPI(M)	R. Selvaraj	44,365	42.18	
Margin of victory		11,550	11	
Turnout		1,05,156	65.82	
INC gain from Independent		Swing		

=== 1996 ===
There were 1,53,135 registered voters in the constituency for the 1996 election.

1996 Kerala Legislative Assembly election: Parassala
Party	Candidate	Votes	%	±%
Independent	N Sundaran Nadar	36,297	37.9	
CPI(M)	W R Heeba	31,570	33.0	
INC	M R Reghuchandrabal	19,264	20.1	
Margin of victory		4,727	4.9	
Turnout		95,663	64.84	
Independent gain from INC		Swing		

=== 1991 ===
There were 1,41,743 registered voters in the constituency for the 1991 election.

1991 Kerala Legislative Assembly election: Parassala
Party	Candidate	Votes	%	±%
INC	M R Reghuchandrabal	48,423	49.44	
CPI(M)	M Sathyanesan	40,788	41.64	
BJP	Premkumar	7,934	8.10	
Margin of victory		7,635	7.80	
Turnout		97,950	70.42	
INC gain from CPI(M)		Swing		

=== 1987 ===
There were 1,19,240 registered voters in the constituency for the 1987 election.

1987 Kerala Legislative Assembly election: Parassala
Party	Candidate	Votes	%	±%
CPI(M)	M Sathyanesan	41,754	46.09	
INC	N Sundaran Nadar	35,062	38.70	
BJP	P Sukumaran	12,222	13.49	
Margin of victory		6,692	7.39	
Turnout		90,592	76.48	
CPI(M) gain from INC		Swing		

=== 1982 ===
There were 95,560 registered voters in the constituency for the 1982 election.

1982 Kerala Legislative Assembly election: Parassala
Party	Candidate	Votes	%	±%
INC	N Sundaran Nadar	34,503	52.05	
CPI(M)	V J Thankappan	31,782	47.95	
Margin of victory		2,721	4.10	
Turnout		66,285	69.89	
INC hold		Swing		

=== 1980 ===
There were 94,757 registered voters in the constituency for the 1980 election.

1980 Kerala Legislative Assembly election: Parassala
Party	Candidate	Votes	%	±%
INC	N Sundaran Nadar	40,680	60.90	
CPI(M)	M Sathyanesan	26,121	39.10	
Margin of victory		14,559	21.80	
Turnout		66,801	70.81	
INC gain from CPI(M)		Swing		

=== 1979 by-election ===
1979 by-election: Parassala
Party	Candidate	Votes	%	±%
CPI(M)	M. Sathyanesan	27,986	38.54	
INC(I)	N Sundaran Nadar	20,657	28.45	
INC	P. C. Nadar	19,068	26.26	
Margin of victory		7,329	10.09	
Turnout		72,613		
CPI(M) gain from INC		Swing		

=== 1977 ===
There were 85,457 registered voters in the constituency for the 1977 election.

1977 Kerala Legislative Assembly election: Parassala
Party	Candidate	Votes	%	±%
INC	M. Kunjukrishnan Nadar	34.485	57.61	
CPI(M)	M. Sathyanesan	21,084	35.22	
Margin of victory		13,401	22.39	
Turnout		59,856	74.38	
INC gain from CPI(M)		Swing		

=== 1970 ===
There were 71,309 registered voters in the constituency for the 1970 election.

1970 Kerala Legislative Assembly election: Parassala
Party	Candidate	Votes	%	±%
CPI(M)	M. Sathyanesan	20,512	41.46	
INC	N Sundaran Nadar	16,231	32.81	
INC(O)	N. Gamaliel	12,729	25.73	
Margin of victory		4,281	8.65	
Turnout		49,472	69.92	
CPI(M) gain from INC		Swing		

=== 1967 ===
There were 59,976 registered voters in the constituency for the 1967 election.

1967 Kerala Legislative Assembly election: Parassala
Party	Candidate	Votes	%	±%
INC	N. Gamaliel	23,299	57.68	
Independent	V. Titus	17,095	42.32	
Margin of victory		6,204	15.36	
Turnout		40,394	69.48	
INC hold		Swing		

== See also ==
- Parassala
- Thiruvananthapuram district
- List of constituencies of the Kerala Legislative Assembly
- 2016 Kerala Legislative Assembly election
