= R. Selvaraj (politician) =

Indian politician

Member of Kerala Legislative Assembly
- In office 1 June 2011 – 2 June 2016
- Succeeded by: K. A. Ansalan
- Constituency: Neyyattinkara
- In office 2006–2011
- Succeeded by: A. T. George
- Constituency: Parassala

Personal details
- Born: 5 March 1949 (age 77) Dhanuvachapuram, Trivandrum
- Party: Indian National Congress (2012-present)
- Other political affiliations: Communist Party of India (Marxist) (before 2012)
- Spouse: Smt. Mary Valsala
- Children: 2 daughters
- As of 29 Oct, 2012 Source: kerala.gov.in

R. Selvaraj was a Member of the Legislative Assembly (MLA) representing Neyyattinkara constituency, Thiruvananthapuram, Kerala, India. He was a member of the Communist Party of India (Marxist), the present ruling party in Kerala but resigned from the Kerala Legislature and the party on 9 March 2012 and joined Indian National Congress party. His resignation was attributed to rampant factionalism in his party. After joining the Indian National Congress, he contested the by-election from Neyyattinkara on "Hand" symbol and romped home with a margin of 6,334 votes, pushing up the ruling UDF's slender majority in the 140-member Kerala Assembly to 73. He again contested from the same constituency in 2016 and 2021 but he got defeated in both elections, i.e. for 9543 votes in 2016 and it increased to 14262 votes in 2021. He was defeated by K. Ansalan of CPI(M) in both elections.

== Early life ==
R. Selvaraj was born to Shri. Varghese Nadar and Smt. Ruthe Nadar at Dhanuvachapuram near Neyyattinkara on 5 March 1949. He has an elder sister, R.Sarojam and an elder brother, R.Chinnappan. He married Smt. Mary Valsala, they have two daughters Divya.M.S and Deepthi.M.S and live near Dhanuvachapuram, Thiruvananthapuram.

== Political life ==
Selvaraj entered politics through the student wing of CPI(M), S.F.I and K.S.Y.F. He was elected for the first time to the Kerala Legislative Assembly on 2006 from Parassala constituency in Thiruvananthapuram. Later in the 2011 state election, he was elected from Neyyattinkara Constituency.

On 9 March 2012, Selvaraj submitted his resignation from the post of MLA as well as the membership in the CPI(M) district committee, citing growing factionalism in the party and on being targeted by a section in the district party leadership. In April 2012, he joined the ruling party of the state, Indian National Congress. Selvaraj was fielded in by the Congress party in the by-election and was re-elected from the same constituency on 14 June 2012 by a margin of 6334 votes after a fierce triangular battle for the seat.

Major Election Victories
| Year | Constituency | Closest rival | Majority (votes) |
|---|---|---|---|
| 2006 | Parassala | N. Sundaran Nadar (INC(I)) | 4,407 |
| 2011 | Neyyattinkara | Thampanoor Ravi (INC(I)) | 6,702 |
| 2012 | Neyyattinkara | F. Lowrence (CPM) | 6,334 |

Other Positions held

- C.P.I.(M) Area Secretary, Parassala
- Vice-president, Kollayil Panchayat
- District Joint Secretary, Karshaka Sangham, Thiruvananthapuram
- Member, C.P.I. (M) District Committee, Thiruvananthapuram
