= T. J. Chandrachoodan =

Indian politician (1940–2022)

Comrade T. J. Chandrachoodan
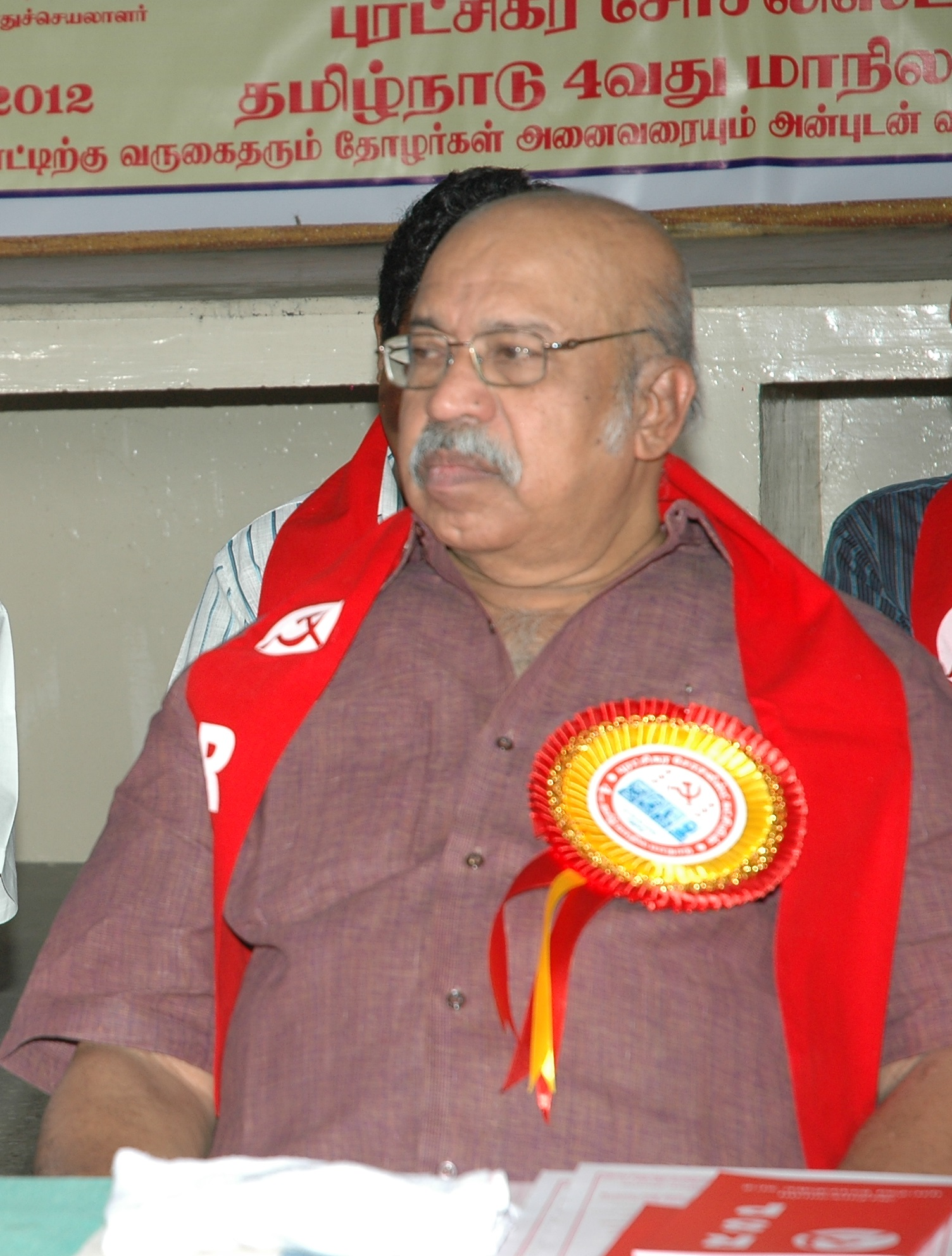
- Chandrachoodan in 2012

General Secretary of the Revolutionary Socialist Party
- In office 2008–2018
- Preceded by: K. Pankajakshan
- Succeeded by: Kshiti Goswami

Personal details
- Born: 20 April 1940
- Died: 31 October 2022 (aged 82) Thiruvananthapuram, Kerala, India
- Party: Revolutionary Socialist Party
- Education: Kerala University

T.J. Chandrachoodan (20 April 1940 – 31 October 2022) was an Indian politician. He was the general secretary of the Revolutionary Socialist Party (RSP) in 2008 to 2018.

== Early life and education ==
T.J. Chandrachoodan is the son of T.J. Janarthanan. As a student, Chandrachoodan obtained a M.A. degree from Kerala University in 1962 as the first rank. During his university period, he was active in the RSP student wing, All India Progressive Students union. He also worked as in the weekly Kaumudi. In 1969 he began working as a lecturer at a college.

== RSP state leadership ==
In 1975 Chandrachoodan was inducted into the Kerala State Secretariat of RSP. He stood as the RSP candidate in Trivandrum West in the 1982 Kerala Legislative Assembly election. He finished in second place with 24,373 votes. He gave up his teaching profession in 1987 and contested the Trivandram West seat in the 1987 Kerala Legislative Assembly election, finishing in second place with 30,096 votes.

In 1990 he was included in the central secretariat of RSP. In 1999 he became secretary of the Kerala State Committee of the party. Chandrachoodan stood as the RSP candidate for the Arianad seat in the 2006 Kerala Legislative Assembly election. He finished in second place with 40,858 votes.

Chandrachoodan lost a re-election for the post as RSP Kerala State Committee secretary in January 2008, defeated by V.P. Ramakrishna Pillai by 22 against 18 votes in the Kerala State Committee.

== General Secretary ==
Chandrachoodan was elected general secretary of the RSP on 24 March 2008, at a national party conference held in Delhi. He is the third Keralite to head the RSP. He was considered a potential contender for a seat in the Rajya Sabha in 2009. According to press sources the Communist Party of India (Marxist), or CPI(M), was interested in getting Chandrachoodan elected to the national parliament, because of his skills as an orator. He had played an important role in the United Progressive Alliance–Left Coordination Committee, which dealt with the Indo-U.S. nuclear deal. But the RSP Kerala State Committee secretary V.P. Ramakrishna Pillai and others in the Kerala leadership of the party opposed his candidature, and opted not to request the seat at the Left Democratic Front convention. In the subsequent election to the Rajya Sabha, the RSP requested that Chandrachoodan be nominated as Kerala's Left Democratic Front candidate, but the CPI(M) was no longer interested in supporting his candidature.

In 2012 Chandrachoodan was re-elected as RSP general secretary at the 19th party conference in Alipurduar. In the run-up to the 2014 Lok Sabha election, Chandrachoodan was noted for distancing himself from the CPI(M).

Chandrachoodan died in Thiruvananthapuram on 31 October 2022, at the age of 82.
