= A. T. George =

Indian politician (born 1954)

A.T. George

Member of Kerala Assembly
- In office 2011–2016
- Preceded by: R. Selvaraj
- Succeeded by: C. K. Hareendran
- Constituency: Parassala

Personal details
- Born: 12 March 1954 (age 72)
- Party: Indian National Congress
- Spouse: Prasanna Kumary G
- Children: one son and one daughter

A. Thankappan Nadar George is a member of 13th Kerala Legislative Assembly. He belongs to Indian National Congress party and represented Parassala constituency.

== Political life ==
He started his political life as the president of Kerala Students Union, the students' wing of Indian National Congress. He served as the leader of opposition of Parassala Grama Panchayat and director of Parassala Service Co-operative bank. He is presently the president of several artisans' and laborers' unions functioning within the Indian National Congress.

== Personal life ==
He is the son of Thankappan Nadar and Thressya. He was born in Parassala on 12 March 1954. He is married to Prasanna Kumary G and has two children.
