= M. R. Reghuchandrabal =

Indian politician (1950–2025)

Member of the Kerala Legislative Assembly
- Constituency: Kovalam; Parassala

Minister for Excise
- In office 1991–1995

Personal details
- Born: 12 March 1950
- Died: 8 November 2025 (aged 75) Thiruvananthapuram, Kerala, India

M. R. Reghuchandrabal (12 March 1950 – 8 November 2025) was an Indian politician belonging to Indian National Congress. He represented Kovalam and Parassala in the sixth and ninth Kerala Legislative Assembly respectively. He served as the minister of excise from 2 July 1991 to 16 March 1995 in the Fourth Karunakaran ministry. He has also served as the president of Kanjiramkulam Panchayat. Reghuchandrabal died on 8 November 2025, at the age of 75.
