= Ottasekharamangalam Janardhanan Nair =

Indian politician

Ottasekharamangalam Janardhanan Nair (September 1914 – March 1994) was an Indian politician and leader of Communist Party of India. He represented Neyyattinkara constituency in 1st Kerala Legislative Assembly. Working as a farmer, he took part in the freedom struggle during his school days. Janardhanan Nair joined the Communist Party in 1952. He also served as the manager of Ottasekharamangalam High School. Kanipet Karshaka Sangham was formed at the forefront of the agitation against the eviction of farmers from Kanipat farmers' land in the southern region of Thiruvananthapuram district. From 1952 till his death he was a member of Ottasekharamangalam Grama Panchayat and President for 17 years. He was also a founding senator of the University of Agriculture.
