= M. C. Josephine =

Indian activist and politician (1948–2022)

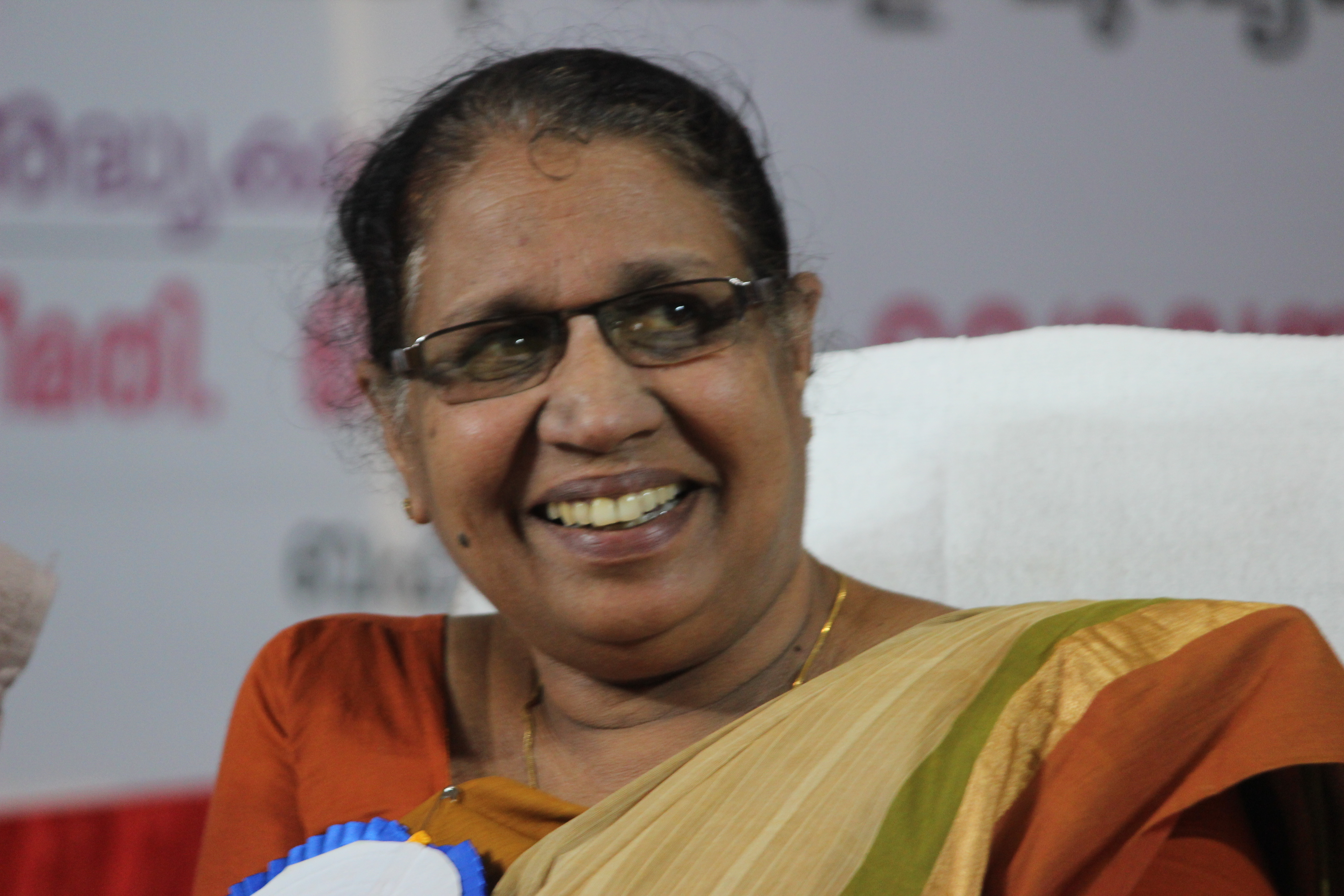
- M. C. Josephine

Chairperson of Kerala Women's Commission
- In office 25 May 2017 – 25 June 2021
- Succeeded by: P. Sathidevi

Personal details
- Born: 3 August 1948 Kochi, Kingdom of Cochin, India
- Died: 10 April 2022 (aged 73) Kannur, Kerala, India
- Cause of death: Myocardial infarction
- Known for: Former Chairperson of Kerala Women's Commission

Mappilassery Chavara Josephine (3 August 1948 – 10 April 2022) was an Indian activist and politician who served as the Chairperson of Kerala Women's Commission from 25 May 2017 to 25 June 2021. She was a central committee member of the CPI(M) and she was the candidate of CPI(M) for the 2006 Kerala Legislative Assembly election from the former Mattancherry constituency. She died from a heart attack on 10 April 2022, at the age of 73, while attending the Communist Party Congress in Kannur.
