= C. K. Hareendran =

Indian politician

Member of the Kerala Legislative Assembly
- Incumbent
- Assumed office 2016
- Preceded by: A. T. George
- Constituency: Parassala

Personal details
- Party: Communist Party of India (Marxist)

C. K. Hareendran is the member of 14th Kerala Legislative Assembly. He represents Parassala constituency. He is the former Sruthy arts club secretary for Neyyattinkara.

== Elections ==
Election candidature history
Election	Year	Party	Constituency	Opponent		Result	Margin	Ref.
Kerala Legislative Assembly	2016	CPI(M)	Parassala	INC	A. T. George	Won	18,566	
Kerala Legislative Assembly	2021	CPI(M)	Parassala	INC	Ansajitha Ressal	Won	25,828	
Kerala Legislative Assembly	2026	CPI(M)	Parassala	INC	Neyyattinkara Sanal	Won	15,013	
