= V. J. Thankappan =

Indian politician (1934–2019)

Minister for Local Administration
- In office 17 June 1991 – 2 April 1987
- Constituency: Nemom and later Neyyattinkara

Personal details
- Born: 20 April 1934
- Died: 9 March 2019 (aged 84)
- Party: Communist Party of India (Marxist)

Vattavilakathu Johnson Thankappan is a communist politician from Kerala.

He was born on 20 April 1934 at Aralummoodu to Johnson and Gnanamma. He married Bella and has three sons and a daughter. Before entering politics he had worked as a clerk in the Kerala State Road Transport Corporation. He is known for playing a crucial role during the implementation of decentralisation project in Kerala. He died on 9 March 2019.

== Political life ==
Thankappan entered politics by his activism in the Communist Party of India from 1963. After the split in the party, he chose to remain with Communist Party of India (Marxist). He was the Councillor of Neyyattinkara Municipality during the period 1968 to 1979. He became its Chairman of the Municipality in 1979 and remained in office till 1984. Thankappan was elected to the 7th Kerala Legislative Assembly from Nemom Assembly Constituency through a by-election held on 2 March 1983. He got re-elected from the same constituency in both 1987 and 1991. In the Second E. K. Nayanar ministry, he became the Minister for Local Administration from 2 April 1987 to 17 June 1991. He has also acted as the Vice- Chairman of Third Administrative Reforms Committee, and has headed the Committee on Decentralisation of Administration. In 2006, he again got elected to Kerala Legislature from Neyyattinkara Assembly Constituency. During this period where V S Achuthanandan Government was formed, he acted as the pro-tem Speaker of the house.
