= Madhur =

- Census Town
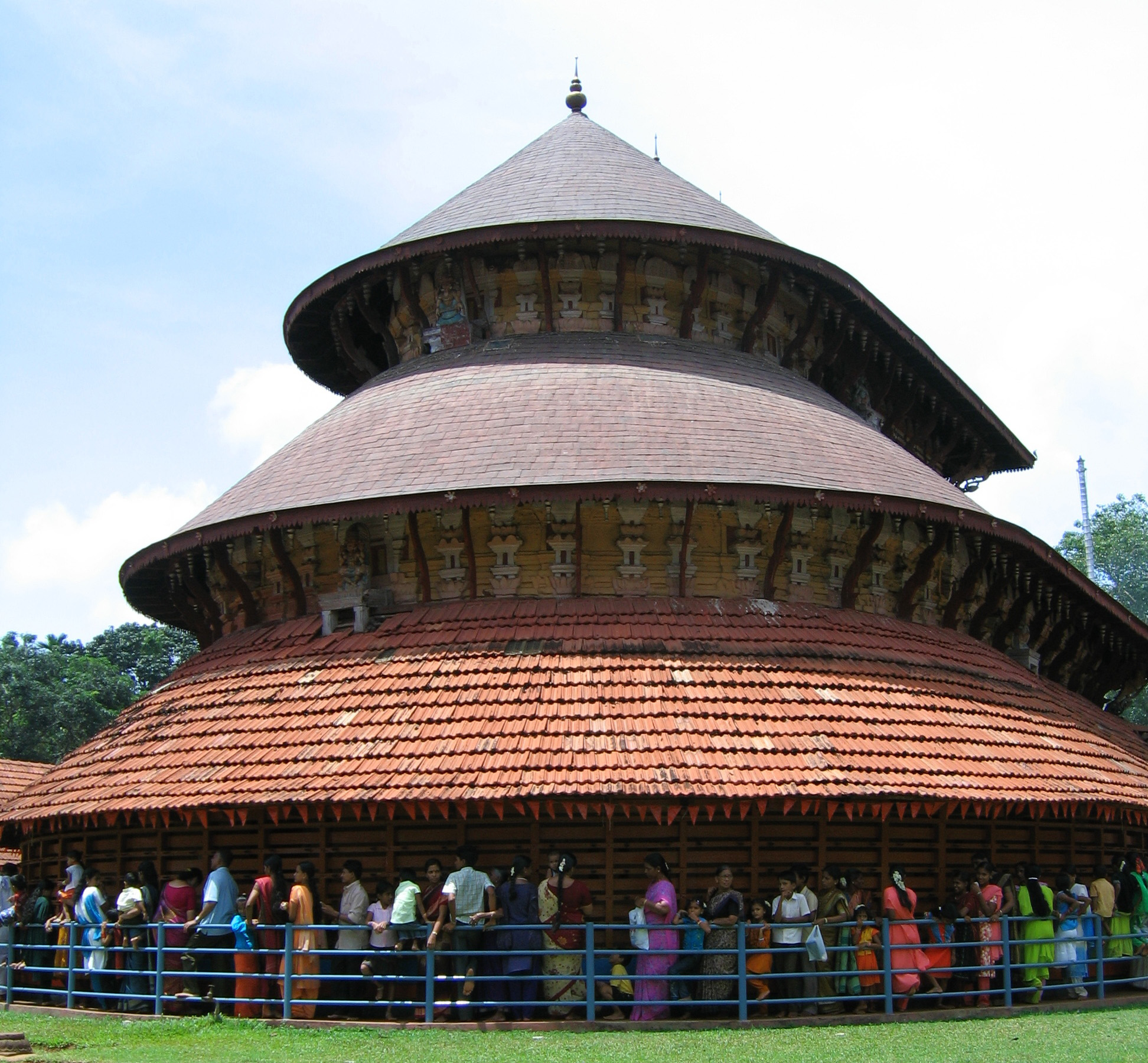
- Madhur Temple, Kasaragod

- Location in Kerala, India Madhur (India)
- Coordinates: 12.5°N 75.0°E
- Country: India
- State: Kerala
- District: Kasaragod
- Taluk: Kasaragod

Government
  - Type: Panchayat raj
  - Body: Madhur Grama Panchayat

Area
  - Total: 10.82 km^{2} (4.18 sq mi)
- Elevation: 19 m (62 ft)

Population (2011)
  - Total: 12,685
  - Density: 1,172/km^{2} (3,036/sq mi)

Languages
  - Official: Malayalam, English
- Time zone: UTC+5:30 (IST)
- PIN: 671121
- Telephone code: 91–4994
- Vehicle registration: KL-14

Madhur is a temple town located in the Kasaragod district of Kerala, India.

== Location ==
Madhur town is located 8 km (5.0 mi) northeast of Kasaragod city and 6 km (3.7 mi) south of the Kasaragod district collectorate.

== Madhur Temple ==
Madhur Temple is one of the biggest temples of Kasaragod district. Its peculiar spherical shape and the riverside location gives it a unique charm. A large number of visitors come to see the temple from Karnataka and Tamil Nadu.

== Image gallery ==
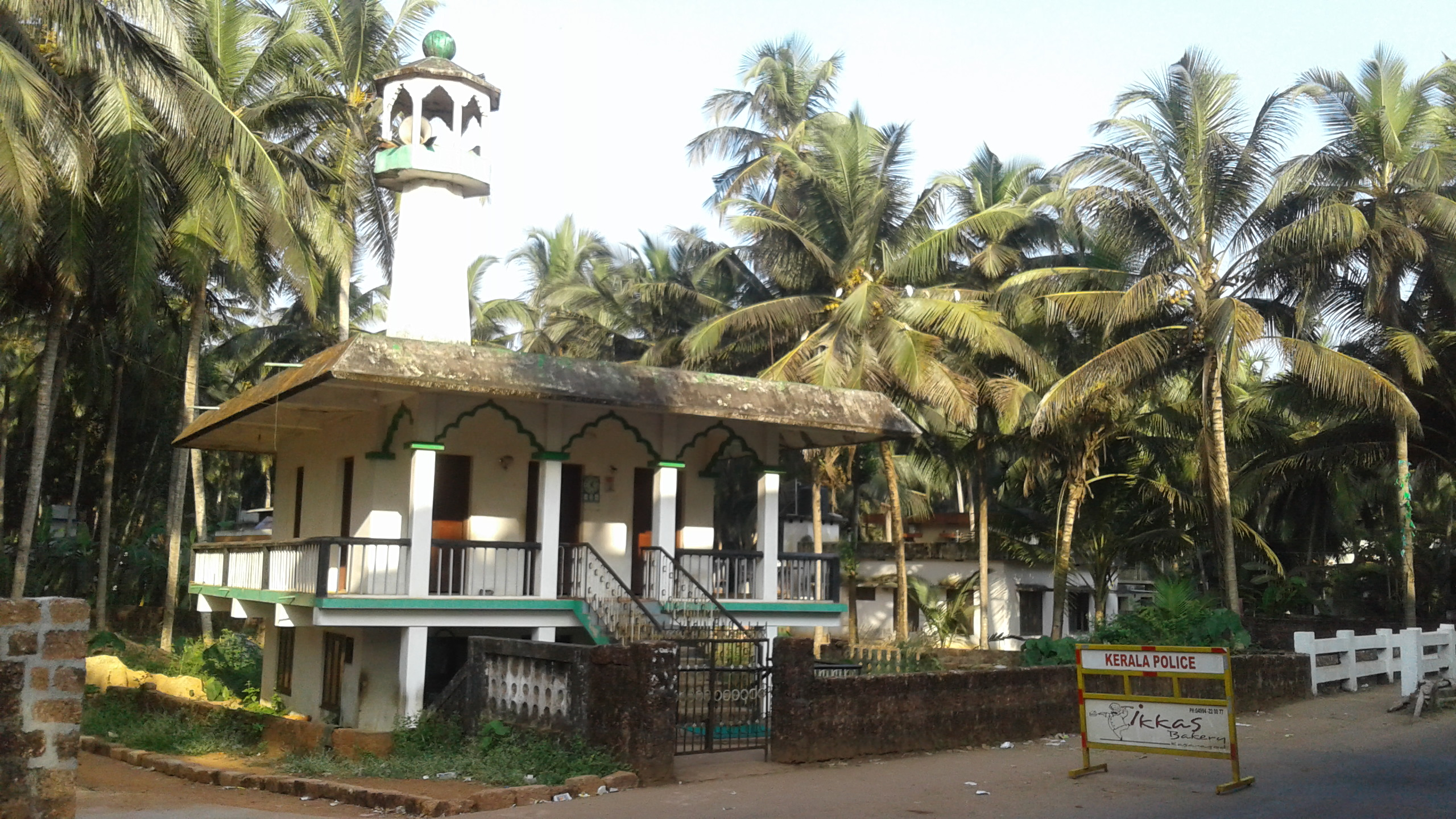
Sunni mosque in Madhur

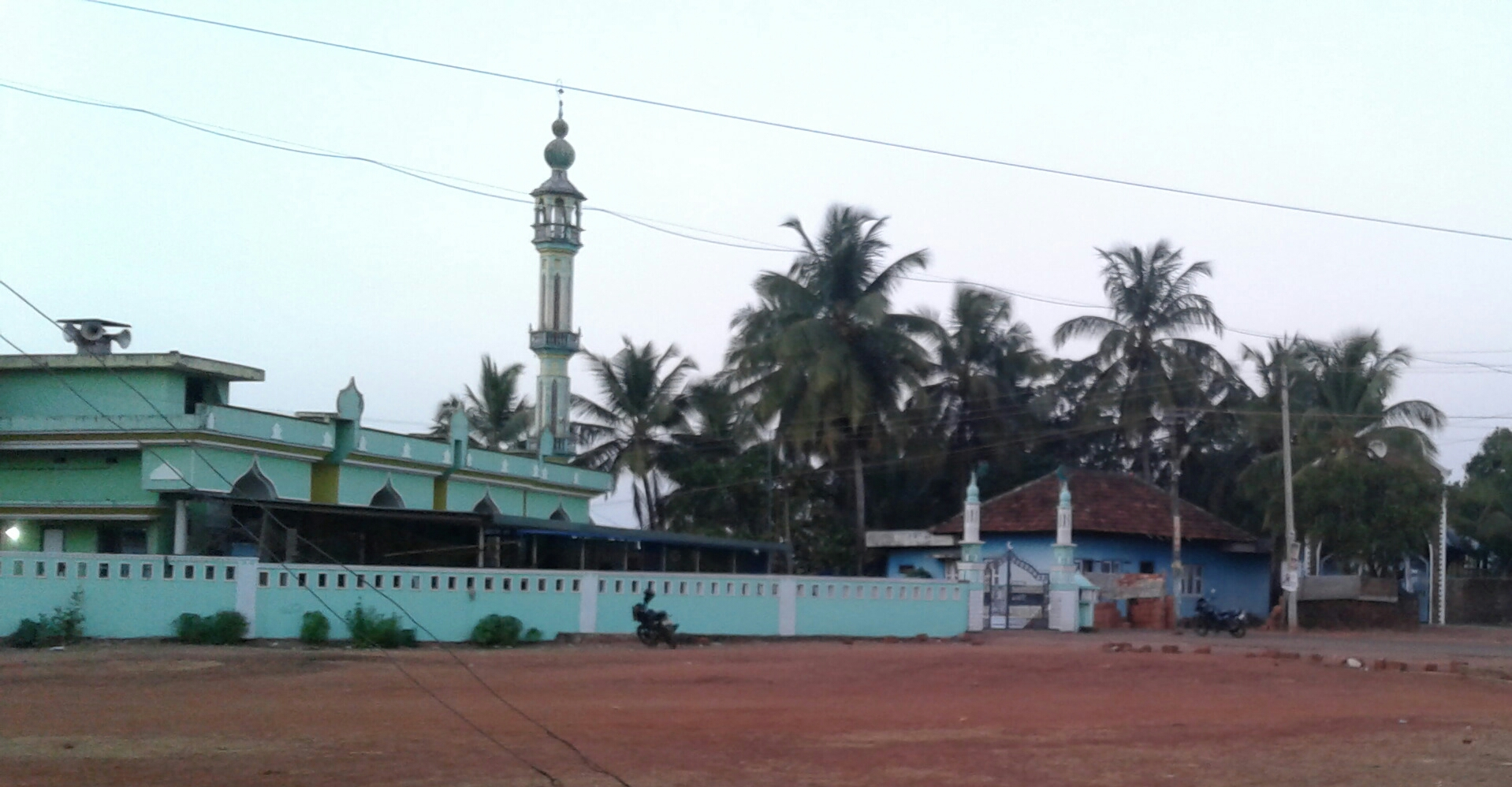
Kilr Masjidh

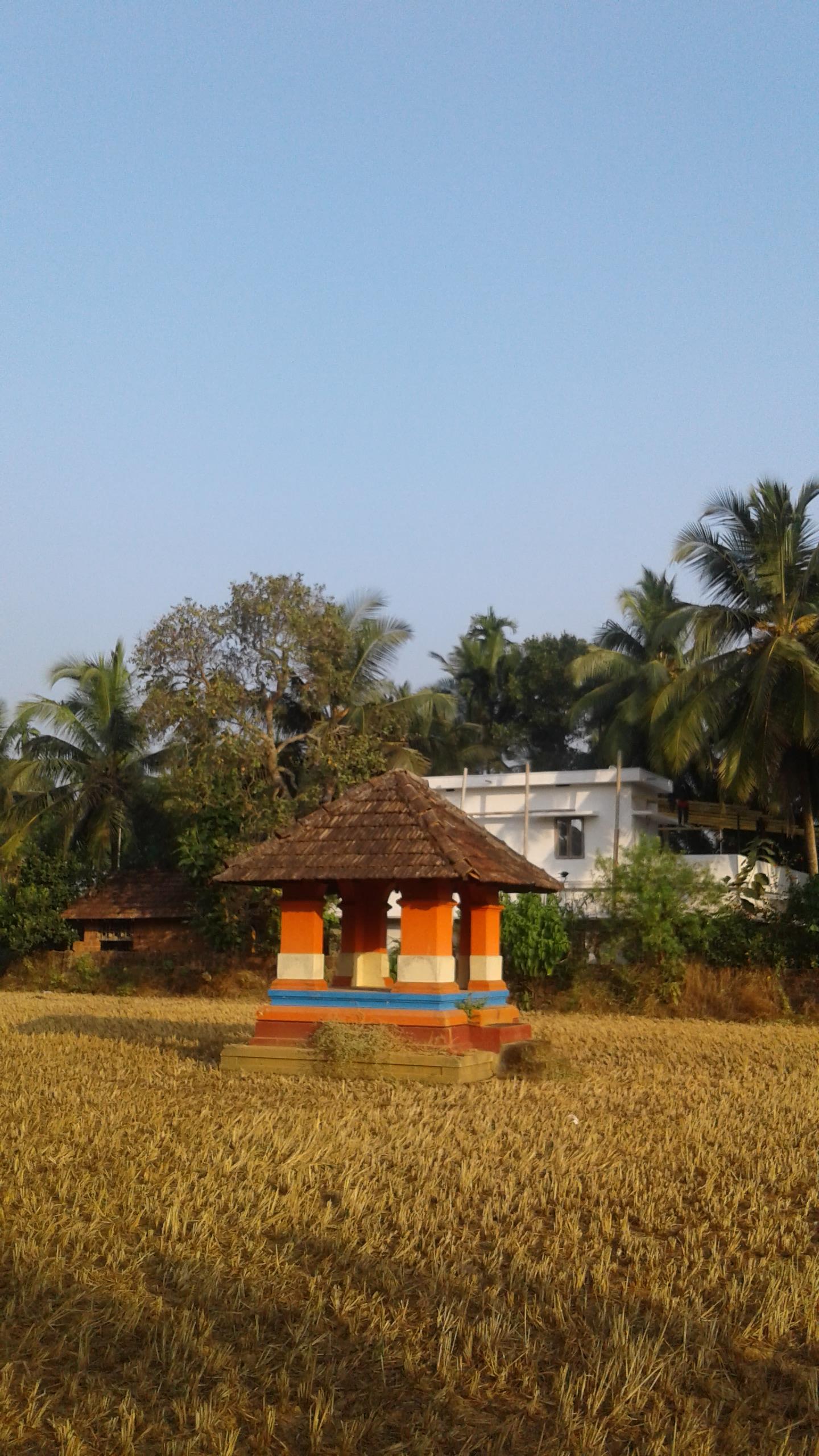
Farmer's God

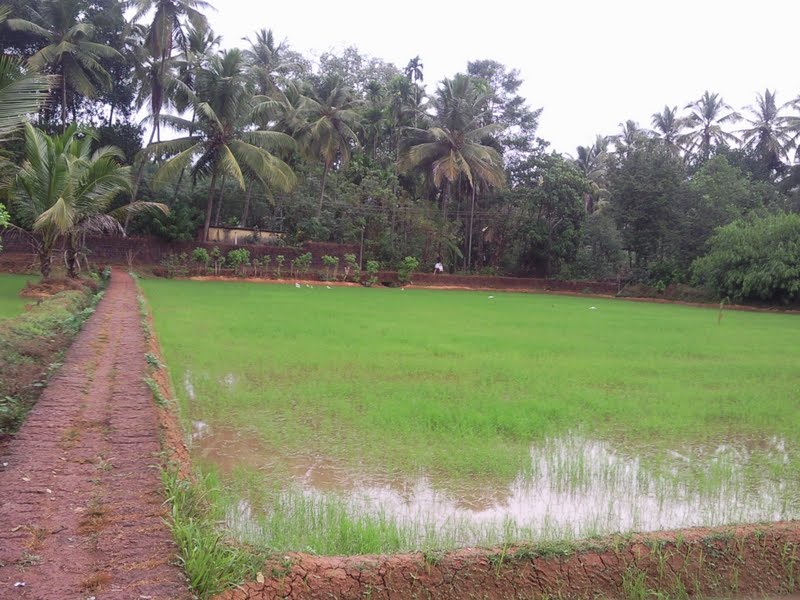
Madhur village
