= M. K. Purushothaman =

Indian politician

M. K. Purushothaman (died June 10, 2013) was an Indian politician, who was Kerala MLA for Njarackal (2006–2011).

== Death ==
Purushothaman died of a heart attack on June 10, 2013.
