= Pallipram Balan =

Indian politician

Member of the Kerala Legislative Assembly
- Constituency: Hosdurg

Personal details
- Born: 10 October 1939 (age 86)
- Party: Communist Party of India

Pallipram Balan (born 10 October 1939) is an Indian politician and leader of Communist Party of India. He represented Hosdurg constituency in 12th Kerala Legislative Assembly.

== See also ==
- Politics of Kerala
