= N. Sundaran Nadar =

Indian politician

N Sundaran Nadar
- In office September 1, 1983 – March 25, 1987
- Minister: Former Minister for Transport, Rural Development and Agriculture
- Constituency: Parassala

Personal details
- Born: 10 September 1931
- Died: 21 January 2007 (aged 75)
- Party: Indian National Congress

N Sundaran Nadar was the Minister for Transport, Rural Development and Agriculture and represented Parassala State assembly constituency in 6th, 7th and 11th Kerala Legislative Assemblies. He was born on 10 September 1931 to J. Nallathampy Nadar and Lekshmi in Chenkal Parassala. He married K. Baby Sarojam, and they have two sons and one daughter. He died on 21 January 2007.

== Political life ==
N Sundaran Nadar was a Grama Sevak during 1954. Later, after resigning from his job in 1960 he joined Communist party of India and continued till 1964. He then joined Indian National Congress. From 1970, for more than 10 years he served as the chairman of block committee. In his long but turbulent political life in congress party, he was elected as the Executive Member of Kerala Pradesh Congress Committee during the period 1987–90. From 1993 to 1996 he served as the Chairperson of Kerala State Palmyrah Products Development and workers’ Welfare Corporation Limited (KELPAM).

In 6th Kerala Legislative Assembly he won representing Indian National Congress (Indira). In the 7th Kerala Legislative Assembly, he represented Indian National Congress. In the third Karunakaran Ministry from 1982 to 1987 Sundaran Nadar was the Minister for Transport, Rural Development and Agriculture. Congress denied him a seat in 1996 Assembly Election, but in the 10th Kerala Legislative Assembly he again represented Parassala as a successful Independent candidate. In the 11th Kerala Legislative Assembly, he represented the Parassala constituency from Congress Party. From 2001 to 2006, he was the deputy speaker of Kerala Legislative Assembly. From 5 September 2004 to 16 September 2004 he has also held the office of acting Speaker of Kerala Legislative Assembly. He failed to repeat his chances in 2006 Kerala Assembly election.

In his memory, a statue was erected at the traffic island of Neyyatinkara. This ran into controversy after a case was filed against its launch in Supreme Court. While considering this case on 18 January 2013 the Supreme Court of India banned the installation of statues and similar structures on roadsides. This statue was vandalised by the members of youth congress in 2020.
