= N. Rajan =

Indian politician (born 1956)

N. Rajan (born 27 November 1956) is an Indian politician and a leader of the Communist Party of India (CPI). He was a member of the 8th KLA 10th KLA and 11th KLA representing the Kilimanoor constituency.
