= M. Kunjukrishnan Nadar =

Indian politician (1911–1978)

Member of the Kerala Legislative Assembly
- Succeeded by: N. Gamaliel
- Constituency: Kovalam; Parassala

Personal details
- Born: 3 April 1911
- Died: 15 August 1978 (aged 67)

M. Kunjukrishnan Nadar (3 April 1911 – 15 August 1978) was an Indian politician. He represented Parassala constituency in the first and second Kerala Legislative Assemblies and Kovalam Constituency in the fourth legislative assembly. Kunjikrishnan Nadar also served as the President of Kanjiramkulam Grama Panchayat and was the chairman of Kerala Craft Development Board.
