= Nettanige =

- village
- Location in Kerala, India
- Coordinates: 12.6101°N 75.1720°E
- Country: India
- State: Kerala
- District: Kasaragod

Government
  - Body: Bellur Grama Panchayat

Area
  - Total: 51.68 km^{2} (19.95 sq mi)

Population (2011)
  - Total: 6,305
  - Density: 122.0/km^{2} (316.0/sq mi)

Languages
  - Official: Malayalam, English
- Time zone: UTC+5:30 (IST)
- PIN: 671543
- Vehicle registration: KL-14
- Nearest city: Mulleria

Nettanige is a village in Kasaragod district in the state of Kerala, India.

== Demographics ==
As of 2011 Census, Nettanige village had a population of 6,305 with 3,183 males and 3,122 females. Nettanige village has an area of 51.68 km^{2} (19.95 sq mi) with 1,301 families residing in it. In Nettanige, 9.7% of the population was under 6 years of age. Nettanige had an average literacy of 84.63% higher than the national average of 74% and lower than the state average of 94%: male literacy was 90.30% and female literacy was 78.87%.
