= J. Arundhathi =

Indian politician (born 1945)

Member of the Kerala Legislative Assembly
- In office 2006–2011
- Constituency: Vamanapuram constituency

Personal details
- Born: 6 August 1945 (age 80) Pettah, Thiruvananthapuram, British India
- Party: Communist Party of India (Marxist)
- Spouse: N. Gopinathan
- Children: 1 son 1 daughter
- Parents: N. Madhavan Pillai; Janamma

J. Arundhathi (born 6 August 1945) is an Indian politician from Kerala, India. She represented Vamanapuram constituency in the 12th Kerala Assembly. She is a member of the Communist Party of India (Marxist) Thiruvananthapuram District Committee.

== Biography ==
She was born on 6 August 1945 at Pettah, Thiruvananthapuram to N. Madhavan Pillai and Janamma. She entered active politics as a student. She was a member of Vembayam Grama Panchayat, Nedumangad Block Panchayat and Thiruvananthapuram District Panchayat. She is the Joint District Secretary of the All India Democratic Women's Association, Thiruvananthapuram.
