= Kallatra Mahin =

Indian politician (born 1964)

Kallatra Mahin Haji [born:1964] is an Indian politician, businessman and landlord from Kasaragod, Kerala. He is a member of the 16th Kerala Legislative Assembly representing the Kasaragod Assembly constituency. He was elected in the 2026 Kerala Legislative Assembly election as a candidate of the Indian Union Muslim League (IUML).

== Early life , Family and Business Career ==
Mahin was born and brought up in Melparamba, Kasaragod, Kerala, into the Kallatra family. His father, the late Kallatra Abdul Khader Haji, was a prominent Muslim League leader, educator, businessman and philanthropist.

Abdul Khader Haji was closely associated with the establishment and development of Jamia Sa-adiya Arabiya in Deli, Kasaragod. In 1971, he reportedly donated more than 55 acres of land for the development of the institution, including facilities intended for orphaned and economically disadvantaged students. Over the years, Jamia Sa-adiya developed into a major educational and charitable institution in northern Kerala.

Mahin completed his Class XII and pre-degree education in 1981. Following his education, he became involved in business and property management.

He serves as the chairman of the Kallatra Parivar Group, which has business interests across Kerala, Karnataka, Maharashtra and the Middle East. The group has interests in multiple sectors, including real estate, landholdings and commercial enterprises. The Kallatra Parivar Group and its associated business interests have been valued at more than ₹5,000 crore, according to reported estimates.

Mahin is also known as a landlord and businessman in the Kasaragod region. The Kallatra family’s involvement in business, education, philanthropy and public life spans several decades.

Mahin’s extended family also has connections with the education sector. His son-in-law, Faisal Khan, is associated with the Noorul Islam educational group and the chancellor of Noorul Islam University.

== Political Career and Public Life ==
Mahin entered active politics through the Indian Union Muslim League (IUML), one of Kerala’s major political parties and a constituent of the United Democratic Front (UDF).

He is the president of the Indian Union Muslim League Kasaragod district committee and Chairman of UDF Kasaragod.

In the 2026 Kerala Legislative Assembly election, Mahin contested from the Kasaragod Assembly constituency as the IUML candidate.

He won the election with 76,396 votes, defeating Ashwini M. L. of the Bharatiya Janata Party (BJP) by a margin of 22,698 votes.

His victory marked his entry into the Kerala Legislative Assembly as the elected representative of the Kasaragod constituency.

According to his election affidavit submitted to the Election Commission of India, Mahin declared assets worth approximately ₹1,061 crore. The declaration made him one of the wealthiest legislators in Kerala and was widely described as placing him among the richest MLAs in the state’s electoral history.

His substantial declared assets, combined with the reported valuation of the Kallatra Parivar Group at more than ₹5,000 crore, attracted considerable public and media attention during the election.

As a legislator, Mahin represents one of the politically significant constituencies in northern Kerala. His public profile combines his family’s historical association with the Muslim League, his business career and the Kallatra family’s involvement in education and philanthropy.

Mahin’s political and public identity has also been influenced by the legacy of his father, Kallatra Abdul Khader Haji, particularly his contributions to educational and charitable institutions in Kasaragod.
