= K. Kunhiraman (born 1943) =

Indian politician (1943–2023)

Member of Kerala Legislative Assembly
- In office 2006–2016
- Preceded by: K. P. Satheesh Chandran
- Succeeded by: M. Rajagopalan
- Constituency: Thrikaripur

Personal details
- Born: 10 November 1943 Thuruthi, South Canara, Madras Province, British India
- Died: 13 December 2023 (aged 80) Kannur, Kerala, India
- Party: CPI(M)
- Spouse: N. T. K. Sarojini

K. Kunhiraman (10 November 1943 – 13 December 2023) was an Indian politician from Kasaragod, Kerala. He was a member of the Kerala Legislative Assembly representing Thrikaripur Assembly constituency from 2006 to 2016. He was a member of the State Committee of Communist Party of India (Marxist). He held a diploma in Ayurvedic medicine and was an Ayurvedic doctor. He died in a private hospital in Kannur on 13 December 2023 at the age of 80 due to natural, age-related illnesses.
