= C. T. Ahammed Ali =

Indian politician (born 1944)

Member of the Kerala Legislative Assembly
- In office 1980–2011
- Constituency: Kasaragod

Minister for Local Administration, Government of Kerala
- In office June 1991 – March 1995

Minister for Public Works, Government of Kerala
- In office 20 April 1995 – 09 May 1996

Personal details
- Born: April 5, 1944 (age 82) Chemnad, Kasaragod, Kerala, India
- Party: Indian Union Muslim League
- Spouse: A. Ummalimma
- Children: 4 (1 son and 3 daughters)

Chemnad Thaazhevalappil Ahammed Ali (born 5 April 1944) is an Indian politician. He is a Former Member of the Kerala Legislative Assembly from the Kasargod Assembly constituency since 1980 to 2011. He also served as Minister for Local Administration from June 1991 to March 1995 and Minister for Public Works from March 1995 to May 1996. During this period, the Kerala Panchayat Raj Bill and the Kerala Municipality Bill were enacted. He is associated with the Indian Union Muslim League.

== Early life ==
Ali was born to C. T. Abdullah and K. Khadeejabi on 5 April 1944 in Chemnad.

== Personal life ==
Ali was married to A. Ummalimma and they have 4 children together, 1 son and 3 daughters.
