= Kollayil (village) =

- village
- Location in Kerala, India Kollayil (India)
- Coordinates: 8.3892°N 77.1348°E
- Country: India
- State: Kerala
- District: Thiruvananthapuram
- Talukas: Kottarakkara

Government
  - Body: Gram panchayat

Population (2011)
  - Total: 25,428

Languages
  - Official: Malayalam, Hindi, English
- Time zone: UTC+5:30 (IST)
- PIN: 6XXXXX
- Vehicle registration: KL-21/24

Kollayil is a village in Thiruvananthapuram district in the state of Kerala, India. Kollayil Post Office PIN code is 691541. There are 3 schools in Kollayil area. In Kollayil so many government employees are residents here.

== Schools in Kollayil ==
1. Kollayil LPS - This is an Upper Primary School established in 1962. This school situates at Kollayil near the Thiruvananthapuram-Schencotta road. There are about 700 students and 22 teachers at this school.
2. Jawahar LPS Kurakkodu - This is a Lower Primary School established in 1976.
3. Sree Narayana Upper Primary School KOLLAYIL. There are700 students are studying in S. N. U. P. S. Kollayil. English and Malayalam medium classes are conducted in this school. Headmistress of this school is M. R. Mini and senior assistant is D. C. Baiju. This is the best upper primary school in palode sub district. This school started 1962.Founder manager of this school is sri. N.Velayudan.
4. vollyballcourt and fishmarket kollayil.

== Demographics ==
As of 2011 India census, Kollayil had a population of 25428 with 12404 males and 13024 females.
