= K. V. Kunhiraman =

Indian politician

K.V Kunhiraman
- കെ വി കുഞ്ഞിരാമൻ
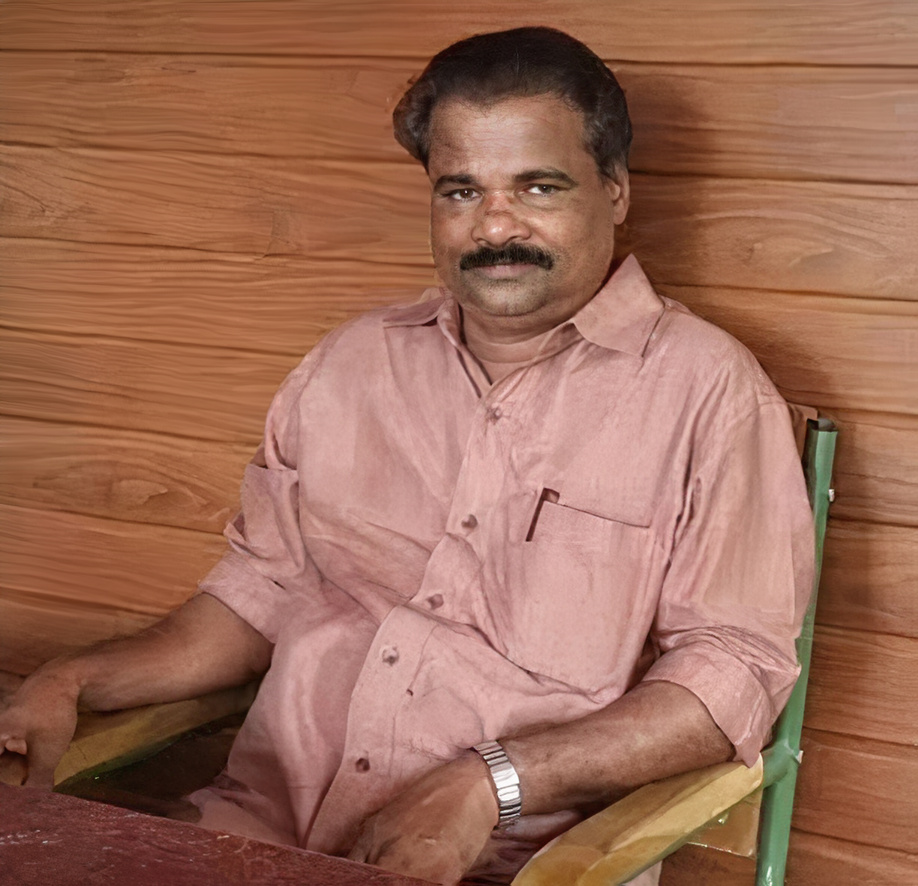
- Born: 13 February 1961 (age 65); Uduma
- Education: Pre-degree
- Known for: Member of Kerala Legislative Assembly
- Notable work: Articles on contemporary political and social issues
- Spouse: B.Kairali
- Children: 1 daughter
- Parent(s): K. Appukkan and K.V Chirutha

K.V. Kunhiraman (born 13 February 1961) is an Indian politician (former CPIM MLA) at Udma in Kasaragode District and one of the indirect offenders in the Periya double murder case. He was born as the son of Shri K Appukkan and Smt. K V Chirutha. He studied until Pre-Degree and entered politics and became a political and social worker. He studied up to 10th standard in GHSS Uduma and Pre-Degree in Kasaragode Govt. College. He entered politics through Bala Sangam while he was a student. He was the joint secretary of Hosdurg Taluk Balam Sangam committee. He became the president and secretary of Uduma area S.F.I committee. Then he became the president of S.F.I Kasaragode District committee. During the period of 1980-87 he became the member of S.F.I Kerala state committee. He also became the president and secretary of DYFI Uduma block committee and district committee. Then he became the member of DYFI state executive committee. He was also the Secretary of BalaSangam Rakhshathikari Samithi.

He served as a member of Uduma Grama Panchayath during the period of 1987-96 and became its vice president during 1996–2000. He was the secretary of CPI(M) Uduma Area Committee during 1998–2001. He was elected as the Member of Legislative Assembly of Kerala twice (In 2001 and in 2006).

== Controversies ==
On December 2, 2021, the CBI arraigned the former MLA Kunhiraman as accused of the killing of two Youth Congress workers at Periya in 2019." On January 3, 2025, he was given a 5 year imprisonment by the court.
