= K. Ansalan =

Indian politician

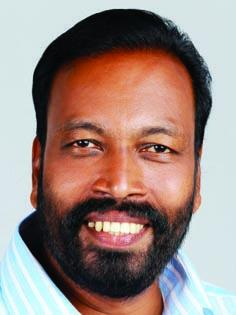

Member of the Kerala Legislative Assembly
- In office 2016–2026
- Preceded by: R. Selvaraj
- Constituency: Neyyattinkara

Personal details
- Born: 28 May 1966 (age 59) Neyyattinkara
- Party: Communist Party of India (Marxist)

Karunakaran Ansalan (കരുണാകരൻ ആൻസലൻ) (born 28 May 1966) is the member of 14th Kerala Legislative Assembly. He represented Neyyattinkara constituency and belongs to Communist Party of India (Marxist).

He completed his SSLC from Government BHS, Neyyattinkara in 1982.

He entered politics through the students movement SFI during his schooling at Boys higher secondary school Neyyattinkara. He did his predegree at Kattakkada Christian college and became SFI area secretary in Neyyattinkara. Later he became DYFI area secretary and then was elected as the Amaravila local committee secretary of CPI(M). He became Municipal councilor from Manaloor, and second term from Rameswaram. He served as Neyyattinkara municipal vice chairman. He became party area secretary and party fielded him as the candidate of assembly election 2016 from Neyyattinkara constituency. He won both assembly elections in 2016 & 2021 and became MLA of Neyyattinkara constituency. He was also the District President of Kerala Vyapari Vyavasayi Samithi and former secretary of KVVS Neyyattinkara Area.
