= Thampanoor Ravi =

Indian politician (born 1949)

Thampanoor Ravi തമ്പാനൂര്‍ രവി

Politician

Personal details
- Born: 26 November 1949 (age 76) Thiruvananthapuram
- Party: Indian National Congress
- Spouse: Smt. T. Jayakumari
- Children: 1 son and 1 daughter
- As of 30 Oct, 2012

Thampanoor Ravi (Malayalam:തമ്പാനൂര്‍ രവി; born 26 November 1949, in Thiruvananthapuram, Kerala) is an Indian politician belonging to the Indian National Congress party and former Kerala MLA representing the Neyyattinkara constituency of Thiruvananthapuram, Kerala, India. He represented the Neyyattinkara constituency in the Kerala Legislative Assembly for three terms (1991–96, 1996–2001, and 2001–06).

== Early life ==
Thampanoor Ravi was born to S. Sekhara Pillai and B. Saraswathy Amma in Thiruvananthapuram on 26 November 1949. He completed his Bachelor of Arts degree and married T. Jayakumari, with whom he has one son and one daughter. He lives near Sasthamangalam, Thiruvananthapuram.

== Political life ==
Thampanoor Ravi was elected to the Kerala Legislative Assembly for the first time in 1991 from the Neyyattinkara constituency, which represented the Congress party. Before his victory, the constituency had been a stronghold of the Left Democratic Front. He was re-elected during the 1996 and 2001 elections and thus represented the constituency for 15 years in the Kerala Legislative Assembly.

Major Election Victories
Year	Constituency	Closest rival	Majority (votes)
1991	Neyyattinkara	S.R Thankaraj (JD)	1,974
1996	Neyyattinkara	Charupara Ravi (JD)	14,424
2001	Neyyattinkara	S.B.Rosechandran (JD(S))	6,475

Other Positions Held and details

- Member: K.S.E.B Board of Directors, K.S.F.E., Kerala State Transport Advisory Committee, Kerala Sports Council
- Member: All India Congress Committee since 1991
- President: Youth Congress, Trivandrum District
- Member: INTUC National Council
- State General Secretary: INTUC
- Vice President: Thiruvananthapuram DCC
- Executive Member: Trivandurm Development Authority.
