= Kazhakootam Assembly constituency =

Constituency of the Kerala legislative assembly in India

Kazhakootam
- Constituency No. 132 for the Kerala Legislative Assembly
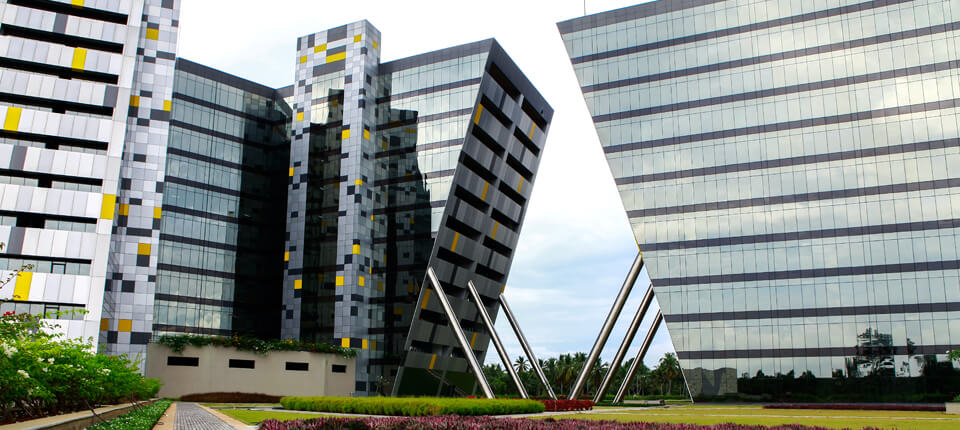
- Technopark at Kazhakootam is first and largest Information Technology park in India.

Constituency details
- Country: India
- Region: South India
- State: Kerala
- District: Thiruvananthapuram
- Established: 1965
- Total electors: 1,81,771 (2016)
- Reservation: None

Member of Legislative Assembly
- 16th Kerala Legislative Assembly
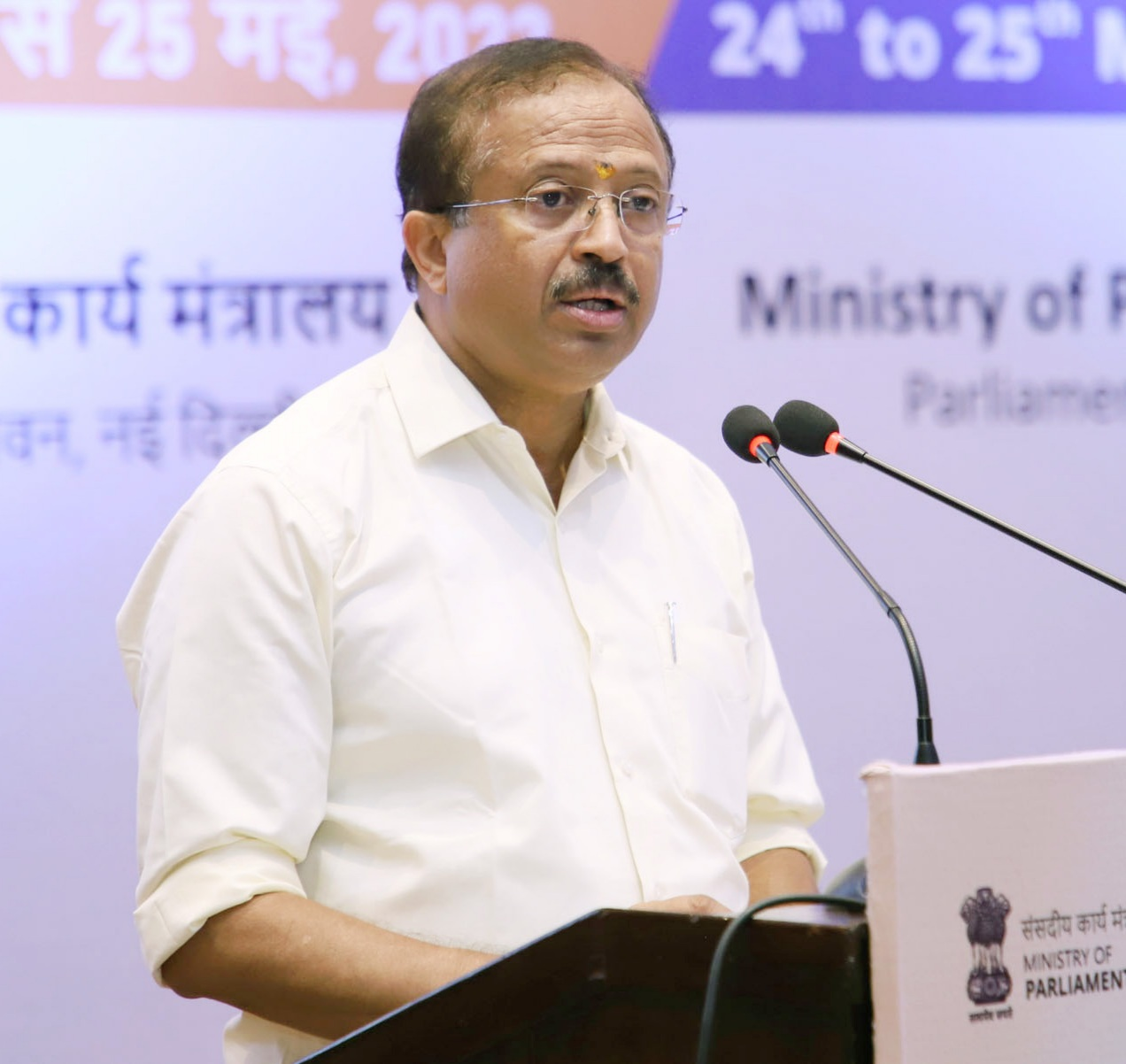
- Incumbent V Muraleedharan
- Party: BJP
- Alliance: NDA
- Elected year: 2026

Kazhakootam is No 132 of the 140 state legislative assembly constituencies in Kerala in southern India. It is also one of the seven state legislative assembly constituencies included in Thiruvananthapuram Lok Sabha constituency.

== Local governed segments ==
Name	Type	Taluk
Wards 1–12, 14, 76 and 81 including Kazhakoottam, Sreekaryam, Ulloor, Medical college, Mannanthala, Pallithura and Poundukadavu of Thiruvananthapuram Corporation	Corporation wards	Thiruvananthapuram

== Members of Legislative Assembly ==
The following list contains all members of Kerala Legislative Assembly who have represented the constituency:

Election	Name	Party
1965	N. Lakshmanan	Indian National Congress
1967	M. H. Sahib	Indian Union Muslim League
1970	P. Neelakandan	Samyukta Socialist Party
1977	Thalekunnil Basheer	Indian National Congress
1977	A. K. Antony	Indian National Congress
1980	M. M. Hassan	Indian National Congress (Urs)
1982	M. M. Hassan	Independent
1987	Nabeesa Ummal	Independent
1991	M. V. Raghavan	Communist Party of India (Marxist)
1996	Kadakampally Surendran	Communist Party of India (Marxist)
2001	M. A. Vaheed	Independent politician
2006	M. A. Vaheed	Indian National Congress
2011	M. A. Vaheed	Indian National Congress
2016	Kadakampally Surendran	Communist Party of India (Marxist)
2021	Kadakampally Surendran	Communist Party of India (Marxist)
2026	V. Muraleedharan	Bharatiya Janata Party

== Election results ==
Percentage change (±%) denotes the change in the number of votes from the immediately previous election.

=== 2026 ===
2026 Kerala Legislative Assembly election: Kazhakootam
Party	Candidate	Votes	%	±%
BJP	V. Muraleedharan	46,564	35.39	▲6.33
CPI(M)	Kadakampally Surendran	46,136	35.06	▼10.98
INC	T. Sarath Chandra Prasad	37,183	28.26	▲4.41
NOTA	None of the above	981	0.75	
Margin of victory		428	0.32	▼16.68
Turnout		131587		
BJP gain from CPI(M)		Swing	▼10.98	

=== 2021 ===
2021 Kerala Legislative Assembly election: Kazhakootam
Party	Candidate	Votes	%	±%
CPI(M)	Kadakampally Surendran	63,690	46.04	▲9.48
BJP	Shobha Surendran	40,193	29.06	▼2.84
INC	S.S Lal	33,995	23.85	▼4.97
NOTA	None of the above	668	0.48	
BSP	Kochumani	1899	0.27	▲1.12
Independent	V. Sasikumaran Nair	199	0.09	
Independent	Lalumon	22	0.08	
Independent	Syamlal	21	0.06	
Independent	Adv. Sen A. G.	20	0.05	
Margin of victory		23,497	17.0	
Turnout		1,40,707		
CPI(M) hold		Swing		

=== 2016 ===
There were 1,81,771 registered voters in the constituency for the 2016 Kerala Assembly election.

2016 Kerala Legislative Assembly election: Kazhakootam
Party	Candidate	Votes	%	±%
CPI(M)	Kadakampally Surendran	50,079	37.38	▼7.00
BJP	V. Muraleedharan	42,732	31.90	▲25.04
INC	M. A. Vaheed	38,602	28.82	▼17.56
NOTA	None of the above	822	0.61	
BSP	Kochumani	496	0.37	▼0.25
Independent	N. A. Vahid	412	0.31	
Independent	Aneesh	370	0.28	
Independent	Surendran Pillai	108	0.08	
Independent	Manimekhala	84	0.06	▼0.15
Independent	Sasikala	83	0.06	
Independent	Murukan A.	59	0.04	
Independent	Muraleedharan	58	0.04	
Independent	Prasad P.	54	0.04	
Margin of victory		7,347	5.48	
Turnout		1,33,959	73.70	▲6.61
CPI(M) gain from INC		Swing		

=== 2011 ===
There were 1,63,199 registered voters in the constituency for the 2011 election.

2011 Kerala Legislative Assembly election: Kazhakootam
Party	Candidate	Votes	%	±%
INC	M. A. Vaheed	50,787	46.38	
CPI(M)	C. Ajayakumar	48,591	44.38	
BJP	J. R. Padmakumar	7,508	6.86	
Independent	M. Wahid	986	0.90	
BSP	K. Bhuvanendran Chettiyar	678	0.62	
SDPI	M. A. Jaleel	418	0.38	
Independent	Sudarshanan S.	325	0.30	
Independent	K. Ajithkumar	205	0.19	
Margin of victory		2,196	2.00	
Turnout		1,09,498	67.09	
INC hold		Swing		

=== 2006 ===
2006 Kerala Legislative Assembly election: Kazhakootam
Party	Candidate	Votes	%	±%
INC	M. A. Vaheed	51,296	46.89	
CPI(M)	Kadakampally Surendran	51,081	46.70	
BJP	Madavoor Radhakrishnan Unnithan	2,499	2.28	
Margin of victory		215	0.19	
Turnout		1,09,379		
INC gain from Independent		Swing		

=== 2001 ===
There were 1,74,313 registered voters in the constituency for the 2001 election.

2001 Kerala Legislative Assembly election: Kazhakootam
Party	Candidate	Votes	%	±%
Independent	M. A. Vaheed	49,917	44.45	
CPI(M)	Bindu Ummar	45,624	40.62	
Independent	Mohammedali Nishad	10,408	9.27	
Margin of victory		4,293	3.83	
Turnout		1,12,307	64.43	
Independent gain from CPI(M)		Swing		

=== 1996 ===
There were 1,68,659 registered voters in the constituency for the 1996 election.

1996 Kerala Legislative Assembly election: Kazhakootam
Party	Candidate	Votes	%	±%
CPI(M)	Kadakampally Surendran	56,425	53.87	
Independent	E A Rasheed	32,368	30.90	
BJP	Padmakumar	9,230	8.81	
Margin of victory		24,057	22.97	
Turnout		1,04,740	63.84	
CPI(M) gain from CMP		Swing		

=== 1991 ===
There were 1,55,360 registered voters in the constituency for the 1991 election.

1991 Kerala Legislative Assembly election: Kazhakootam
Party	Candidate	Votes	%	±%
CMP	M. V. Raghavan	51,243	48.38	
CPI(M)	A Nabeesa Ummal	50,554	47.73	
BJP	Padmakumar	2,298	2.17	
Margin of victory		689	0.65	
Turnout		1,05,924	69.47	
CMP gain from Independent		Swing		

=== 1977 by-election ===
There were 86,434 registered voters in the constituency for the 1977 election.

1977 Kerala Legislative Assembly election: Kazhakootam
Party	Candidate	Votes	%	±%
INC	A. K. Antony	38,463	55.33	
Independent	P. Sreedharan Nair	29,794	42.86	
Margin of victory		8669	12.47	
Turnout		69,504	80.41	
INC hold		Swing		

=== 1977 Assembly election ===
1977 Kerala Legislative Assembly election: Kazhakootam
Party	Candidate	Votes	%	±%
INC	Thalekunnil Basheer	37,014	59.94	
AIML	A Essuddin	22,637	36.66	
Margin of victory		14,377	23.28	
Turnout		61,747	76.61	
INC gain from SSP		Swing		

== See also ==
- Kazhakootam
- Thiruvananthapuram district
- List of constituencies of the Kerala Legislative Assembly
- 2016 Kerala Legislative Assembly election
