= 1991 Indian general election in Kerala =

1991 Indian general election
- May–June 1991

20 seats
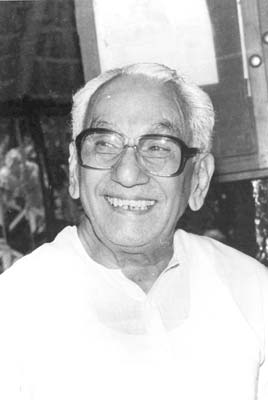

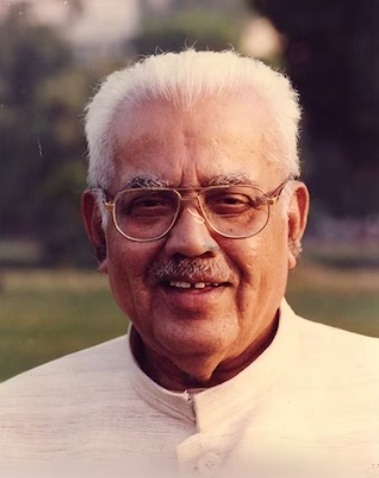
	First party	Second party
Leader	K. Karunakaran	E.K. Nayanar
Party	INC	CPI(M)
Alliance	UDF	LDF
Leader's seat	-	-
Last election	17	3
Seats won	16	4
Seat change	▼1	▲1
Percentage	48.59%	44.28%
Prime Minister before election
Chandra Shekhar
SJP(R)
Prime Minister after election
P. V. Narasimha Rao
INC

The 1991 Indian general election were held to elect 20 members to the tenth Lok Sabha from Kerala. Indian National Congress (INC)-led United Democratic Front (UDF) won 16 seats while Left Democratic Front (LDF), led by Communist Party of India (Marxist) (CPI(M)) won the remaining 4 seats. Turnout for the election was at 70.66% In the Lok Sabha, INC formed a minority government under the premiership of P. V. Narasimha Rao.

== Alliances and parties ==
UDF is a Kerala legislative alliance formed by INC veteran K. Karunakaran. LDF comprises primarily of CPI(M) and the CPI, forming the Left Front in the national level. Bharatiya Janata Party (BJP) contested in 19 seats.

=== United Democratic Front ===
No.	Party	Election Symbol	Seats contested
1.	Indian National Congress		16
2.	Indian Union Muslim League		2
3.	Kerala Congress (M)		1
4.	Independents		1

=== Left Democratic Front ===
No.	Party	Election Symbol	Seats contested
1.	Communist Party of India (Marxist)	Key	9
2.	Communist Party of India	Star	4
3.	Indian Congress (Socialist) - Sarat Chandra Singha		1
4.	Independents		2
5.	Janata Dal		2
6.	Revolutionary Socialist Party		1
7.	Kerala Congress		1

=== Bharatiya Janata Party ===
No.	Party	Election Symbol	Seats contested
1.	Bharatiya Janata Party		19

== List of Candidates ==
Constituency		UDF		LDF		BJP	
#	Name	Party	Candidate	Party	Candidate	Party	Candidate
1	Kasaragod	INC	K. C. Venugopal	CPI(M)	Ramanna Rai	BJP	C. K. Padmanabhan
2	Cannanore	INC	Mullappally Ramachandran	CPI(M)	E. Ebranhim Kutty	BJP	M. K. Saseendran
3	Badagara	IND	M. Ratnasingh	INS(SCS)	K. P. Unnikrishnan		
4	Calicut	INC	K. Muraleedharan	JD	M. P. Veerendra Kumar	BJP	U. Dattathriya Rao
5	Manjeri	IUML	E. Ahamed	IND	V. Venugopal	BJP	Ahalya Sankar
6	Ponnani	IUML	Ebrahim Sulaiman Sait	CPI	Kattisseri Hamza Kunju	BJP	Janachandran Master
7	Palghat	INC	V. S. Vijayaraghavan	CPI(M)	A. Vijayaraghavan	BJP	Rema S. Menon
8	Ottapalam (SC)	INC	K. R. Narayanan	CPI(M)	Lenin Rajendran	BJP	M. A. Pushpakran
9	Trichur	INC	P. C. Chacko	CPI	K. P. Rajendran	BJP	E. Reghunandanan
10	Mukundapuram	INC	Savithri Lakshmanan	CPI(M)	A. P. Kurian	BJP	K. V. Sreedharan Master
11	Ernakulam	INC	K. V. Thomas	CPI(M)	V. Viswanatha Menon	BJP	V. A. Rahman
12	Muvattupuzha	KC(M)	P. C. Thomas	IND	P. I. Devasia	BJP	N. Ajith
13	Kottayam	INC	Ramesh Chennithala	JD	Thampan Thomas	BJP	George Kurian
14	Idukki	INC	Palai K. M. Mathew	KEC	P. J. Joseph	BJP	K. Madhusoodhanan Nair
15	Alleppey	INC	Vakkom Purushothaman	CPI(M)	T. J. Anjalose	BJP	V. S. Vijayakumar
16	Mavelikara	INC	P. J. Kurien	CPI(M)	K. Suresh Kurup	BJP	Chennithala Gopalkrishnan Nair
17	Adoor (SC)	INC	Kodikunnil Suresh	CPI	Bhargavi Thankappan	BJP	C. C. Kunjan
18	Quilon	INC	S. Krishna Kumar	RSP	R. S. Unni	BJP	S. Ramakrishna Pillai
19	Chirayinkil	INC	Thalekunnil Basheer	CPI(M)	Susheela Gopalan	BJP	K. K. R. Kumar
20	Trivandrum	INC	A. Charles	CPI	E. J. Vijayamma	BJP	O. Rajagopal

== List of elected MPs ==
Source
No.	Constituency	Name of Elected M.P.	Party affiliation
1	Kasaragod	Ramanna Rai	CPI(M)
2	Kannur	Mullappally Ramachandran	INC
3	Vatakara	K. P. Unnikrishnan	ICS(SCS)
4	Kozhikode	K. Muraleedharan	INC
5	Manjeri	E. Ahamed	IUML
6	Ponnani	Ebrahim Sulaiman Sait	IUML
7	Palakkad	V. S. Vijayaraghavan	INC
8	Ottapalam	K. R. Narayanan	INC
9	Thrissur	P. C. Chacko	INC
10	Mukundapuram	Savitri Lakshmanan	INC
11	Ernakulam	K. V. Thomas	INC
12	Muvattupuzha	P. C. Thomas	KC(M)
13	Kottayam	Ramesh Chennithala	INC
14	Idukki	K. M. Mathew	INC
15	Alappuzha	T. J. Anjalose	CPI(M)
16	Mavelikkara	P. J. Kurien	INC
17	Adoor	Kodikunnil Suresh	INC
18	Kollam	S. Krishna Kumar	INC
19	Chirayankil	Suseela Gopalan	CPI(M)
20	Thiruvananthapuram	A. Charles	INC

== Results ==
=== Performance of political parties ===
Vote Share by alliance
1. UDF (48.6%)
2. LDF (44.3%)
3. BJP (4.61%)
4. Other (2.52%)

No.	Party	Political Front	Seats	Votes	%Votes	±pp
1	Indian National Congress	UDF	13	55,26,187	38.77%	▲2.93
2	Communist Party of India (Marxist)	LDF	3	29,52,043	20.71%	▼2.16
3	Communist Party of India	LDF	0	11,56,798	8.12%	▲1.92
4	Indian Union Muslim League	UDF	2	7,15,222	5.02%	▼0.21
5	Janata Dal	LDF	0	6,43,366	4.51%	▲2.65
6	Bharatiya Janata Party	none	0	6,56,945	4.61%	▲0.10
7	Indian Congress (Socialist) - Sarat Chandra Singha	LDF	1	3,95,501	2.77%	▲0.29
8	Kerala Congress (M)	UDF	1	3,84,255	2.70%	▲0.34
9	Revolutionary Socialist Party	LDF	0	3,42,796	2.41%	Steady
10	Kerala Congress	LDF	0	3,19,933	2.24%	▲1.78
11	Bahujan Samaj Party	none	0	23,475	0.16%	▲0.04
12	Janata Party	none	0	17,883	0.13%	▼0.13
13	Republican Party of India	none	0	5,840	0.04%	new
14	Deseeya Karshaka Party	none	0	4,508	0.03%	new
15	Door Darshi Party	none	0	3,268	0.02%	new
16	Lok Dal	none	0	3,024	0.02%	new
Independents			0	11,02,111	7.73%	▼1.76

=== By constituency ===
No.	Constituency	UDF candidate	Votes	%	Party	LDF candidate	Votes	%	Party	BJP / Other candidate	Votes	%	Party	Winning alliance	Margin
1	Kasaragod	K. C. Venugopal	3,35,113	43.2%	INC	M. Ramanna Rai	3,44,536	44.4%	CPI(M)	C. K. Padmanabhan	76,067	9.8%	BJP	LDF	9,423
2	Kannur	Mullappally Ramachandran	3,76,696	50.2%	INC	E. Ebrahim Kutty	3,35,569	44.8%	IC(S)	M. K. Saseendran	25,720	3.4%	BJP	UDF	41,127
3	Vatakara	M. Ratnasingh	3,78,012	47.2%	INC	K. P. Unnikrishnan	3,95,501	49.4%	CPI(M)	P. Unnikrishnan	8,566	1.1%	IND	LDF	17,489
4	Kozhikode	K. Muraleedharan	3,55,113	47.1%	INC	M. P. Veerendra Kumar	3,39,229	45.0%	JD	U. Dattathriya Rao	43,661	5.8%	BJP	UDF	15,884
5	Manjeri	E. Ahamed	3,75,456	50.6%	IUML	V. Venugopal	2,86,133	38.6%	CPI(M)	Ahalya Sankar	51,634	7.0%	BJP	UDF	89,323
6	Ponnani	Ebrahim Sulaiman Sait	3,39,766	52.3%	IUML	K. Hamza Kunju	2,44,060	37.6%	CPI	K. Janachandran	45,388	7.0%	BJP	UDF	95,706
7	Palakkad	V. S. Vijayaraghavan	3,34,913	47.7%	INC	A. Vijayaraghavan	3,19,145	45.4%	CPI(M)	Rema S. Menon	31,323	4.5%	BJP	UDF	15,768
8	Ottapalam	K. R. Narayanan	3,27,043	47.7%	INC	Lenin Rajendran	3,11,955	45.5%	CPI(M)	M. A. Pushpakran	33,542	4.9%	BJP	UDF	15,088
9	Thrissur	P. C. Chacko	3,42,896	48.6%	INC	K. P. Rajendran	3,13,665	44.4%	CPI	E. Reghunandanan	38,213	5.4%	BJP	UDF	29,231
10	Mukundapuram	Savithri Lakshmanan	3,62,029	47.8%	INC	A. P. Kurian	3,49,664	46.1%	IND	K. V. Sreedharan	30,776	4.1%	BJP	UDF	12,365
11	Ernakulam	K. V. Thomas	3,62,975	49.0%	INC	V. Viswanatha Menon	3,15,831	42.6%	CPI(M)	V. A. Rahman	30,082	4.1%	BJP	UDF	47,144
12	Muvattupuzha	P. C. Thomas	3,84,255	53.4%	KC(M)	P. I. Devasia	2,86,152	39.8%	IND	N. Ajith	26,783	3.7%	BJP	UDF	98,103
13	Kottayam	Ramesh Chennithala	3,66,759	51.4%	INC	Thampan Thomas	3,04,137	42.6%	JD	George Kurian	22,622	3.2%	BJP	UDF	62,622
14	Idukki	K. M. Mathew	3,45,139	48.3%	INC	P. J. Joseph	3,19,933	44.8%	KEC	K. Madhusoodhanan Nair	25,197	3.5%	BJP	UDF	25,206
15	Alappuzha	Vakkom Purushothaman	3,50,719	47.3%	INC	T. J. Anjalose	3,64,794	49.2%	CPI(M)	V. S. Vijayakumar	15,973	2.2%	BJP	LDF	14,075
16	Mavelikkara	P. J. Kurian	3,04,519	48.4%	INC	K. Suresh Kurup	2,79,031	44.4%	CPI(M)	Chennithala Gopalkrishnan Nair	25,665	4.1%	BJP	UDF	25,488
17	Adoor	Kodikunnil Suresh	3,27,066	48.9%	INC	Bhargavi Thankappan	3,08,471	46.1%	CPI	C. C. Kunjan	17,067	2.6%	BJP	UDF	18,595
18	Kollam	S. Krishna Kumar	3,70,523	50.0%	INC	R. S. Unni	3,42,796	46.2%	RSP	S. Ramakrishna Pillai	16,507	2.2%	IND	UDF	27,727
19	Chirayinkil	Thalekunnil Basheer	3,30,412	47.2%	INC	Suseela Gopalan	3,31,518	47.4%	CPI(M)	K. K. R. Kumar	20,159	2.9%	BJP	LDF	1,106
20	Trivandrum	A. Charles	3,34,272	46.3%	INC	E. J. Vijayamma	2,90,602	40.3%	CPI	O. Rajagopal	80,566	11.2%	BJP	UDF	43,670

== Post-election Union Council of Ministers from Kerala ==
#	Name	Constituency	Designation	Department	From	To	Party
1	A. K. Antony	Kerala (Rajya Sabha)	Cabinet Minister	Civil Supplies; Consumer Affairs; Public Distribution	18 January 1993	8 February 1995	INC
2	K. Karunakaran	Kerala (Rajya Sabha)	Cabinet Minister	Industry	11 June 1995	16 May 1996	INC
3	M. M. Jacob	Kerala (Rajya Sabha)	Minister of State	Home Affairs	21 June 1991	17 January 1993	INC
3	M. M. Jacob	Kerala (Rajya Sabha)	Minister of State	Parliamentary Affairs	21 June 1991	17 January 1993	INC
4	P. J. Kurien	Mavelikara (Lok Sabha)	Minister of State	Industry	21 June 1991	2 July 1992	INC
4	P. J. Kurien	Mavelikara (Lok Sabha)	Minister of State	Industry; Small Scale; Agro and Rural Industries	2 July 1992	17 January 1993	INC
4	P. J. Kurien	Mavelikara (Lok Sabha)	Minister of State	Commerce	10 July 1992	17 January 1993	INC
4	P. J. Kurien	Mavelikara (Lok Sabha)	Minister of State	Non-Conventional Energy Sources	15 September 1995	16 May 1996	INC
9	S. Krishna Kumar	Quilon (Lok Sabha)	Minister of State	Petroleum and Natural Gas	21 June 1991	18 January 1993	INC
9	S. Krishna Kumar	Quilon (Lok Sabha)	Minister of State	Defence	26 June 1991	18 January 1993	INC
9	S. Krishna Kumar	Quilon (Lok Sabha)	Minister of State	Non-Conventional Energy Sources	18 January 1993	13 September 1995	INC
9	S. Krishna Kumar	Quilon (Lok Sabha)	Minister of State	Agriculture	19 February 1993	13 September 1995	INC
6	Mullappally Ramachandran	Cannanore (Lok Sabha)	Minister of State	Agriculture	21 June 1991	17 January 1993	INC

== See also ==
- Elections in Kerala
- Politics of Kerala
