= Annie Mascarene =

Indian politician

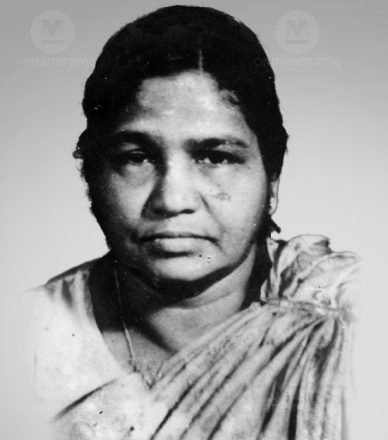
- Annie Mascarene

Member, Constituent Assembly of India

Personal details
- Born: 6 June 1902 Travancore
- Died: 19 July 1963 (aged 61)
- Party: Indian National Congress
- Education: University College, Thiruvananthapuram Government Law College, Thiruvananthapuram

Annie Mascarene (6 June 1902 – 19 July 1963) was an Indian independence activist, politician and lawyer from Thiruvananthapuram, Kerala. She was a member of the Constituent Assembly of India as representative of State of Travancore-Cochin. In 1952, she became the first woman from Kerala to be elected as a Member of Parliament.

== Family and education ==
Mascarene was born in Thiruvananthapuram in June 1902 into a Latin Catholic family. Her father, Gabriel Mascarene, was a government official of the Travancore state. She attended the Maharaja's College, Thiruvananthapuram earning double M.A. in history and economics in 1925. She went on to earn a degree in law at the Law College, Thiruvananthapuram, following her return from a teaching stint in Ceylon.

== Freedom fighter and early politics ==
Along with Akkamma Cherian and Pattom Thanu Pillai, Mascarene was one of the leaders of the movements for independence and integration of the princely states within the Indian nation. In February 1938, when the political party Travancore State Congress was formed, she became one of the first women to join. The party's goal was to establish a responsible government for Travancore and it was led by Pattom Thanu Pillai as president under whom served K. T. Thomas and P. S. Nataraja Pillai, as secretaries, and M. R. Madhava Warrier, as treasurer. Mascarene was appointed to the working committee and also served on the party's publicity committee. One of the first acts of the working committee was to send a memorandum to the Maharaja, Sree Chithira Thirunal Balarama Varma to demand the termination of the appointment of Sir C. P. Ramaswami Iyer and establish an enquiry into his administration, appointments, and financial affairs in his role as Dewan. Iyer and his supporters retaliated for the attack on his administration.

In a statewide propaganda tour undertaken with party president Pillai, Mascarene was outspoken in her criticism of the level of participation allowed in the legislature, of the dewan, and the government. Her statements led to assault by a police officer as well as her home being broken into and her property being stolen. She published an account of the incident, angering the police. Iyer spoke to the Maharaja against her, alleging that Mascarene was making speeches defaming the government and encouraging non-payment of taxes. The police commissioner also reported that she was dangerous and fomenting discontent. Her activism led to numerous arrests and imprisonments for various periods from 1939-1947.

In 1938 and 1939, Mascarene served on the Economic Development Board of the Travancore government. During her time in the state legislature, she became a powerful speaker and enjoyed policymaking. In 1942, Mascarene joined the Quit India Movement and two years later was elected as secretary of the Travancore State Congress. On 21 February 1946 Mahatma Gandhi wrote to Mascarene regarding a speech she had delivered in Bombay, "Even otherwise, I know that you have no control over your tongue and when you stand up to speak, you blab anything that comes to your mind. This speech also is quite a specimen, if the newspaper report is correct. I have sent the report to Bhai Thanu Pillai. You can read it. Such indiscreet talk can do good neither to you nor to the poor people of Travancore. Besides, by your act you put the whole fair sex to shame". Gandhi also wrote to a colleague in the state congress, Pillai hoping to relieve Mascarene of her ministerial role in the government.

== Parliamentary career ==
In 1946, Mascarene became one of the 15 women who were elected to the 299-member Constituent Assembly of India, tasked with drafting the Constitution of India. She served on the Assembly's select committee that looked into the Hindu Code Bill. When the Indian Independence Act 1947 was passed by the British Parliament, the Constitutional Assembly became, on 15 August, the parliament of the Dominion of India. In 1948 she was reelected to the Travancore-Cochin Legislative Assembly and served until 1952. In 1949, she became the first woman post-independence to serve as a Minister in the state, when she was appointed Minister in Charge of Health and Power in the Parur T K Narayana Pillai Ministry.

Mascarene was elected to the First Lok Sabha as an independent candidate from the Thiruvananthapuram Lok Sabha constituency in the 1951 Indian general election. She was the first woman MP from Kerala and one of only 10 women elected to the Parliament in those elections. In the second General Elections of 1957, she was defeated in Thiruvananthapuram by S Easwaran Iyer, coming fourth in a contest that also featured her erstwhile colleague in the Travancore Congress, Pattom Thanu Pillai.

== Death ==
Annie Mascarene died in 1963 and her grave lies at the Pattoor cemetery in Thiruvananthapuram.

== Commemoration ==
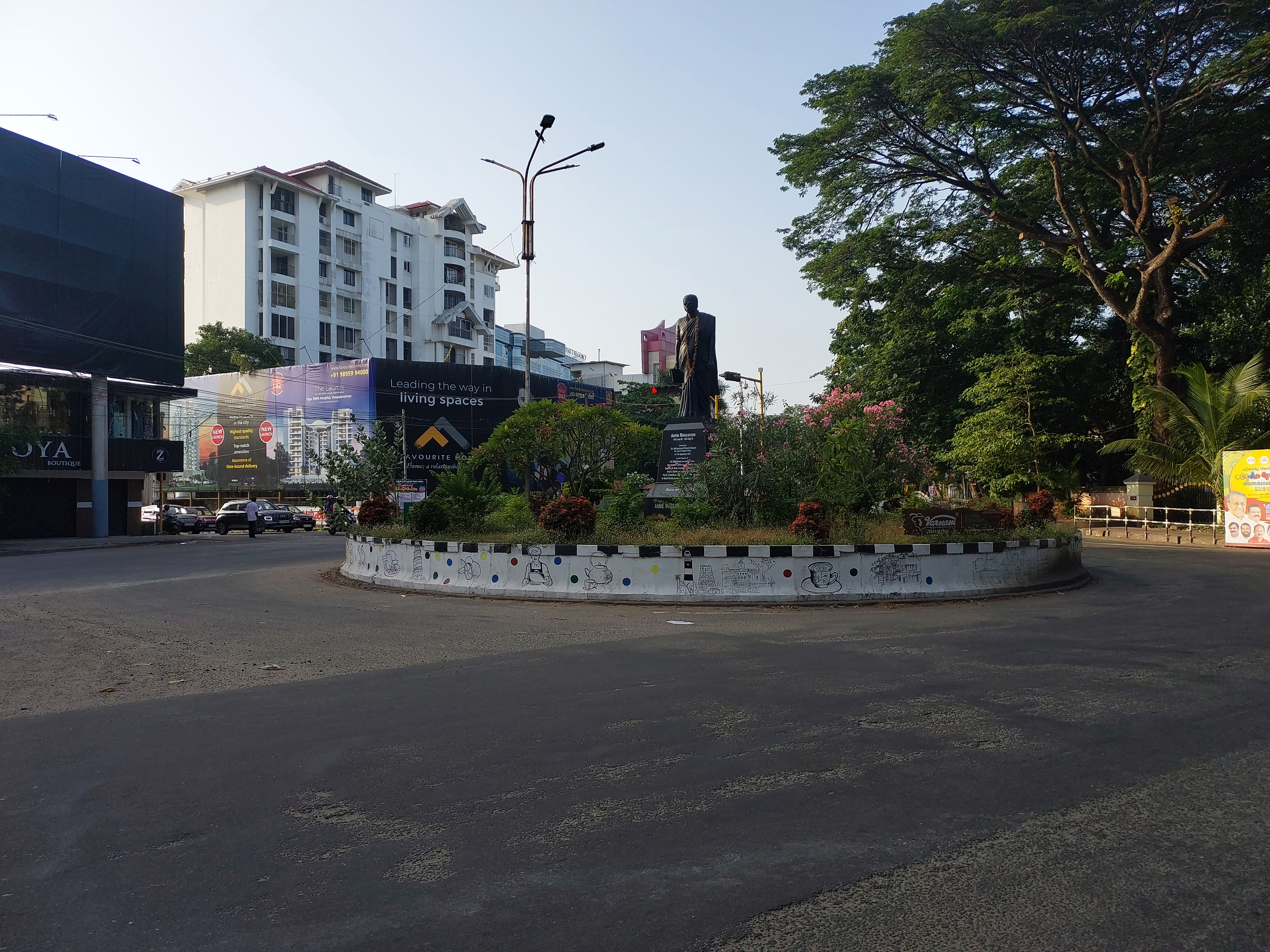
Statue at Vazhuthacaud

In September 2013, a bronze statue of Annie Mascarene was unveiled by Hamid Ansari, the then Vice President of India, at the Annie Mascarene Square, Vazhuthacaud, Thiruvananthapuram.
