= Antony Raju =

Indian politician

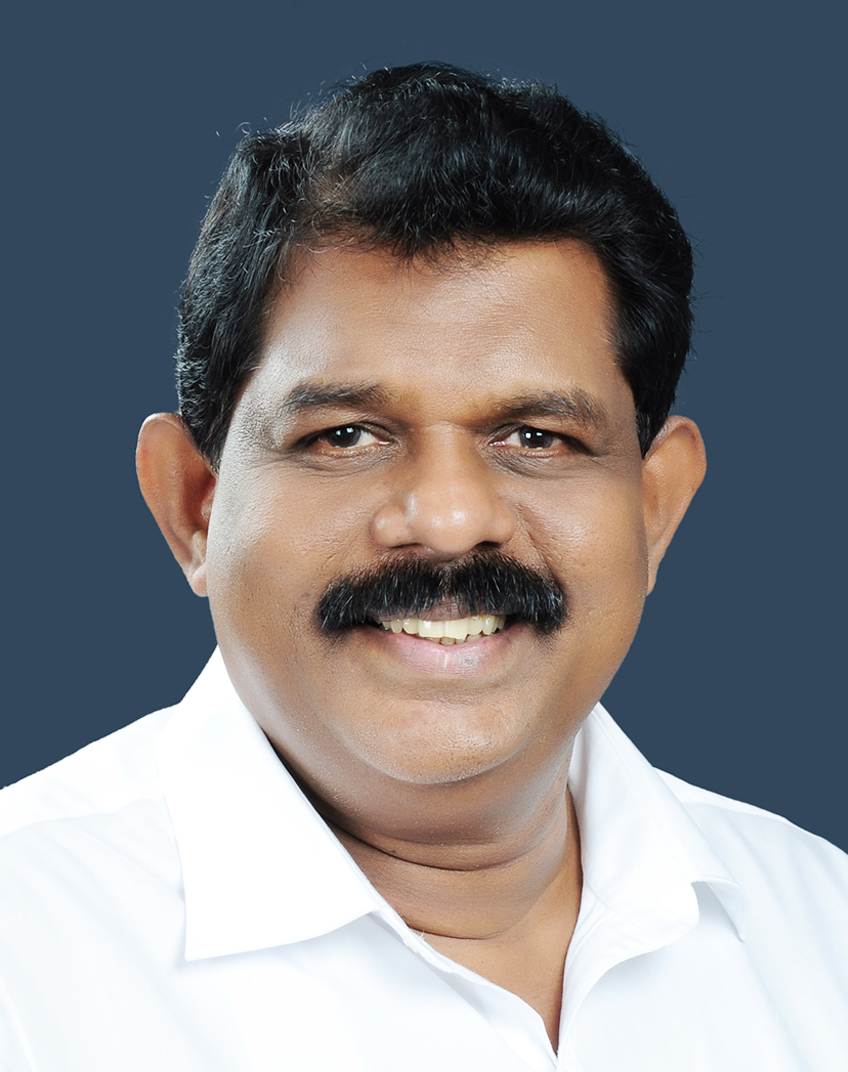

Member of the Kerala Legislative Assembly
- In office 20 May 2021 – 3 January 2026
- Preceded by: V. S. Sivakumar
- Succeeded by: C. P. John
- Constituency: Thiruvananthapuram

Minister for Transport, Government of Kerala
- In office 2 May 2021 – 24 December 2023
- Preceded by: A. K. Saseendran
- Succeeded by: K.B. Ganesh Kumar
- Constituency: Thiruvananthapuram

Member of the Kerala Legislative Assembly
- In office 20 May 1996 – 10 May 2001
- Preceded by: M. M. Hassan
- Succeeded by: M. V. Raghavan
- Constituency: Thiruvananthapuram West

Personal details
- Born: 18 December 1954 (age 71) Trivandrum (Thiruvananthapuram)
- Party: Janadhipathya Kerala Congress
- Website: www.antonyraju.in

Antony Raju is an Indian politician and a former Minister for Transport, Government of Kerala. A leader of Janadhipathya Kerala Congress, he was elected to the Kerala legislative assembly from Thiruvananthapuram Constituency of Kerala in 2021. He was later disqualified under Representation of the People Act, 1951. Earlier he was the MLA of Thiruvananthapuram West Constituency from 1996 to 2001.

== Early life and education ==
Raju was born on 18 November 1954 in Poonthura, Trivandrum (Thiruvananthapuram) to S Alphonse and T Lourdamma in a poor family from the fishing community. He had his early education at the St. Thomas School Poonthura, Trivandrum, and completed his schooling at the Rajagiri School, Kalamassery, Ernakulam. Raju was the unit president of Kerala Students' Congress (KSC), the students' wing of Kerala Congress, in St Xavier's College, Thumba where he completed his pre-degree, and latter in Mar Ivanios College, Thiruvananthapuram. After graduating in Law from the Kerala Law Academy Law College, he enrolled as an advocate in 1982, in Thiruvananthapuram.

== Political career ==
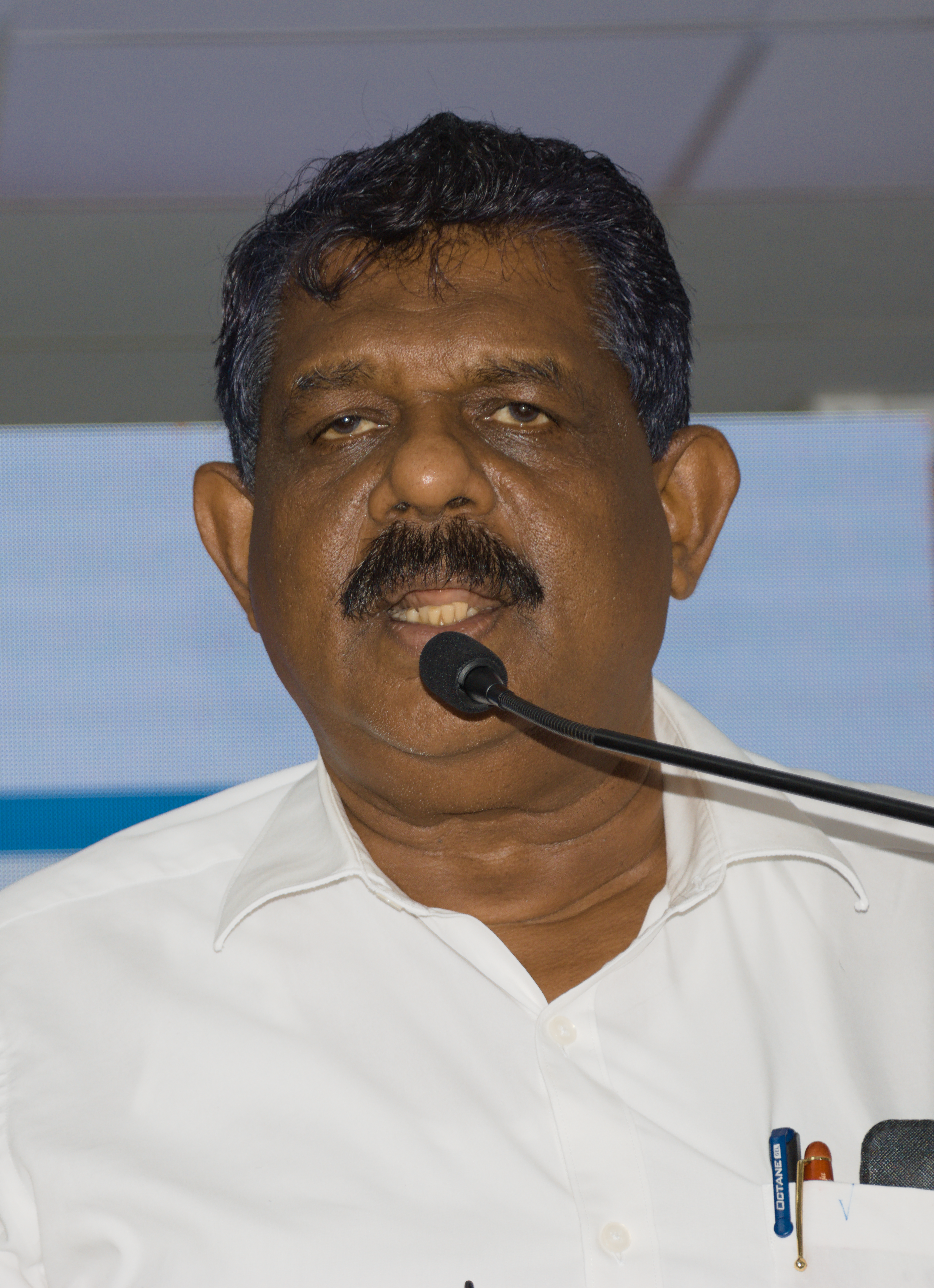
Antony Raju (2023)

In 1996, Antony Raju was KC(J) candidate and contested for LDF. It was Antony's first political victory in Assembly Election from Thiruvananthapuram West Constituency. In the 2016 elections, he contested as Janadhipathya Kerala Congress candidate but lost to V. S. Sivakumar. But in the 2021 elections, he defeated Sivakumar by more than 8,000 votes. The coastal region has been Raju's support base. He contested elections for the first time from Shanghumugham division to the erstwhile district council. Shanghumugham is part of the Thiruvananthapuram Assembly constituency.

In his first attempt to reach the Assembly, he lost to M M Hassan of the Congress in Thiruvananthapuram West in 1991. Raju exacted revenge the next time by defeating Hassan. However, he lost again in 2001, this time to M V Raghavan.

He was not fielded in the next two Assembly polls due to controversies over his legal career. In 2016, Raju lost to V. S. Sivakumar, but defeated the same Congress leader in the 2021 elections.

Antony Raju served as the Minister for Transport in the Second Pinarayi Vijayan ministry for about 2.5 years, resigning in December 2023 to make way for K. B. Ganesh Kumar as part of an LDF cabinet reshuffle.

== Criminal case ==
In April 1990, Australian national Andrew Salvatore Cervelli was arrested at Thiruvananthapuram International Airport after charas was allegedly recovered from his underwear. Raju, then a junior advocate, represented Cervelli in the trial court, which convicted him and sentenced him to 10 years' imprisonment. On appeal, the Kerala High Court acquitted Cervelli in February 1991, holding that the underwear produced as a material exhibit was too small to have been worn by him.

In 1994, following information from the Australian National Central Bureau, a criminal case was registered against Raju and a court clerk on allegations of evidence tampering involving the material exhibit. The magistrate court took cognizance of the case in 2006. In 2023, the Kerala High Court quashed the proceedings on technical grounds, while directing a trial de novo. In 2024, the Supreme Court of India set aside that order and restored the criminal proceedings before the trial court.

On 3 January 2026, the Judicial First Class Magistrate Court–I, Nedumangad, convicted Raju of criminal conspiracy, causing disappearance of evidence, fabricating false evidence, criminal breach of trust, and "acts done by several persons in furtherance of common intention".
