= Nabeesa Ummal =

Indian politician (1931–2023)

- നബീസ ഉമ്മാൾ

Member of the Kerala Legislative Assembly
- In office 1987–1991
- Constituency: Kazhakootam

Personal details
- Born: A. Nabeesa Ummal; 30 June 1931 Kallanvila, Attingal, Travancore, British India
- Died: 6 May 2023 (aged 91) Pathamkallu, Nedumangad, Kerala, India
- Party: CPI(M)
- Spouse: Hussain Kunju
- Children: 6
- Parents: Khader Moideen (father); Asanummal (mother)

A. Nabeesa Ummal (30 June 1931 – 6 May 2023) was an Indian academic, orator, social worker, and Communist Party of India (Marxist) politician from Kerala. She was the first Muslim woman to pursue a postgraduate degree in Malayalam. She was elected to Kerala Legislative Assembly from Kazhakoottam Assembly constituency in 1987 as an independent candidate with the support of Left Democratic Front.

== Biography ==
Nabeesa Ummal was born on 30 June 1931, in Kallanvila, Attingal, in present-day Thiruvananthapuram district of Kerala, as the youngest of five children of Asanummal, a native of Bhoothapandi, Tamil Nadu, and Khader Moideen, a police constable. After studying at Attingal Government Girls High school, Nabeesa Ummal obtained BA and MA degrees from Thiruvananthapuram Women's College, studying Economics, Politics, and History in Malayalam. She was the first Muslim woman to pursue a postgraduate degree in Malayalam.

Ummal married Hussain Kunju, a soldier from Nedumangad, while pursuing her pre-university studies at the Thiruvananthapuram Women's College. The couple had six children.

== Career ==
In 1955, after her studies, Nabeesa joined her alma mater as a third-grade junior lecturer. She then worked as a lecturer in seven colleges in five districts in Kerala and was later promoted to principal at the Government College Malappuram. Nabeesa then returned to the Women's College, where she became first a professor, then the head of the department of Malayalam, and then a principal. Nabeesa was the first woman principal from the Malayalam section at the college. She retired as principal of University College, Thiruvananthapuram, in 1986.

Nabeesa was an orator since she was in school. E. M. S. Namboodiripad invited her to contest the Kerala Legislative Assembly after listening to her speeches during the Sharia controversy that time. She contested and was elected to Kerala Legislative Assembly from Kazhakoottam Assembly constituency in 1987 as an independent candidate with support of Left Democratic Front. But in the 1991 elections, she contested as Left Democratic Front candidate, and lost to M. V. Raghavan of the Communist Marxist Party. In 1995, she was elected to the Nedumangad Municipal Corporation and became chairperson.

Nabeesa also served as a member of the State Planning Advisory Committee, IMG Governing Body, Examination Board of Kerala and MG universities, Public Library Committee, Public Undertaking Committee, and Kerala PSC Question Making Committee.

== Death ==
Ummal died at her residence in Nedumangad's Pathamkallu on 6 May 2023, at the age of 92.

== Awards and honours ==
In 2000, she was awarded the Central Government Award for Women's Empowerment.
