= Thiruvananthapuram Lok Sabha constituency =

Lok Sabha Constituency in Kerala

Coordinates: 8.5°N 76.9°E

Thiruvananthapuram KL-20
- Lok Sabha constituency

Constituency details
- Country: India
- Region: South India
- State: Kerala
- Assembly constituencies: Kazhakootam; Vattiyoorkavu; Thiruvananthapuram; Nemom; Parassala; Kovalam; Neyyattinkara
- Established: 1957
- Total electors: 1,371,427 (2019)
- Reservation: None

Member of Parliament
- 18th Lok Sabha
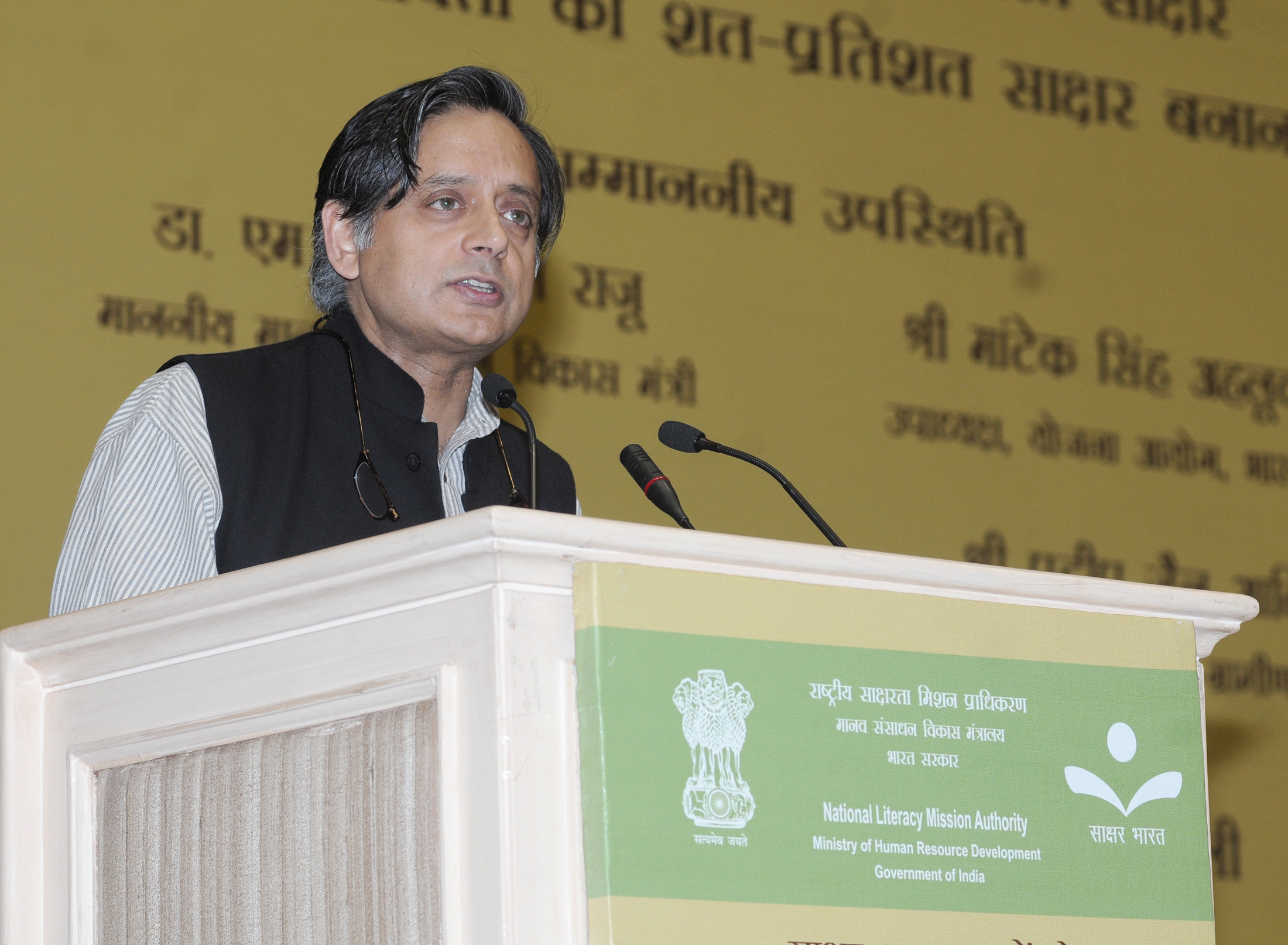
- Incumbent Shashi Tharoor
- Party: INC
- Alliance: UDF
- Elected year: 2024

Thiruvananthapuram Parliamentary (Lok Sabha) Constituency is one of the 20 parliamentary constituencies in Kerala, India. It is located in Thiruvananthapuram district and encompasses the major part of Thiruvananthapuram city, the capital of Kerala State.

The incumbent MP of this constituency, Shashi Tharoor of the Indian National Congress, has been elected on 4 consecutive occasions: 2009, 2014, 2019 and 2024. He is the longest serving Member of Parliament to have represented the constituency.

== Demographics ==
This constituency is dominated By Nair and Nadar. As per the electoral roll for the 2024 polls, the total electorate is of 14,03,281 people including 7,27,469 women, 6,75,771 men and 41 transgender people. Out of total electorate, 26% is rural and 74% is urban. The Scheduled castes (SC) and Scheduled tribes (ST) is 9.82% and 0.45%, respectively of total electorate. The constituency also has highest proportion of Nadars and Converted Christians in Kerala.Nairs dominates the urban segments of Kazhakootam,Nemom,Vattiyoorkavu and Thiruvananthapuram While the Nadars are Concentrated on Neyyattinkara,Parassala,Kovalam.

As per the voter list published by the Election commission for the 2019 Lok Sabha elections, there were 13,34,665 voters in the electorate and 1077 polling stations in this constituency. The voter turnout for the 2019 Lok Sabha election was 73.45% where as it was 68.63% and 65.74% in the 2014 and 2009 elections respectively.

== Assembly segments ==
Thiruvananthapuram Parliament constituency is composed of the following legislative assembly segments:

#	Name	District	Member	Party	2024 lead
132	Kazhakootam	Thiruvananthapuram	V. Muraleedharan	BJP	BJP
133	Vattiyoorkavu	Thiruvananthapuram	K. Muraleedharan	INC	BJP
134	Thiruvananthapuram	Thiruvananthapuram	C. P. John	CMP	INC
135	Nemom	Thiruvananthapuram	Rajeev Chandrasekhar	BJP	BJP
137	Parassala	Thiruvananthapuram	C. K. Hareendran	CPI(M)	INC
139	Kovalam	Thiruvananthapuram	M. Vincent	INC	INC
140	Neyyattinkara	Thiruvananthapuram	N. Sakthan	INC	INC

== Members of Parliament ==
Year	Member	Party
1952	Annie Mascarene	Independent
1957	Easwara Iyer	Independent
1962	P. S. Nataraja Pillai	Independent
1967	P. Viswambharan	Samyukta Socialist Party
1971	V. K. Krishna Menon	Independent
1977	M. N. Govindan Nair	Communist Party of India
1980	Neelalohithadasan Nadar	Indian National Congress (I)
1984	A Charles	Indian National Congress
1989	A Charles	Indian National Congress
1991	A Charles	Indian National Congress
1996	K. V. Surendranath	Communist Party of India
1998	K Karunakaran	Indian National Congress
1999	VS Sivakumar	Indian National Congress
2004	P. K. Vasudevan Nair	Communist Party of India
2005^	Pannian Ravindran	Communist Party of India
2009	Shashi Tharoor	Indian National Congress
2014	Shashi Tharoor	Indian National Congress
2019	Shashi Tharoor	Indian National Congress
2024	Shashi Tharoor	Indian National Congress

^ indicates bypolls

== Election results ==
Percentage change (±%) denotes the change in the number of votes from the immediate previous election.

Vote share of Winning candidates
2024	37.19%
2019	41.19%
2014	34.09%
2009	40.29%
2005	51.41%
2004	37.45%
1999	38.15%
1998	44.35%
1996	44.38%
1991	47.00%
1989	49.02%
1984	43.00%
1980	60.90%
1977	56.32%
1971	53.00%
1967	47.40%
1962	0%
1957	0%

=== General Elections 2029 ===
2029 Indian general election: Thiruvananthapuram
Party	Candidate	Votes	%	±%
INC				
LDF				
BJP				
NOTA	None of the above			
Margin of victory				
Turnout				
		Swing		

=== General election 2024 ===
2024 Indian general election: Thiruvananthapuram
Party	Candidate	Votes	%	±%
INC	Dr. Shashi Tharoor	358,155	37.19	▼4.00
BJP	Rajeev Chandrasekhar	342,078	35.52	▲4.22
CPI	Pannyan Raveendran	247,648	25.72	▲0.12
NOTA	None of the above	6,753	0.70	▲0.70
Majority		16,077	1.66	▼8.23
Turnout		964,351	67.22	▼6.52
Registered electors		1,430,531		
INC hold		Swing	▼4.00	

By Assembly Segments (2024)

No.	Constituency	1st Position	Party	Votes	%	2nd Position	Party	Votes	%	3rd Position	Party	Votes	%	Lead
132	Kazhakootam	Rajeev Chandrasekhar	BJP	50,444	40.56	Shashi Tharoor	INC	39,602	31.84	Pannyan Raveendran	CPI	34,382	26.81	10,842
133	Vattiyoorkavu	Rajeev Chandrasekhar	BJP	53,025	42.02	Shashi Tharoor	INC	44,863	35.52	Pannyan Raveendran	CPI	28,336	22.45	8,162
134	Thiruvananthapuram	Shashi Tharoor	INC	48,296	40.58	Rajeev Chandrasekhar	BJP	43,755	36.78	Pannyan Raveendran	CPI	27,076	22.71	4,541
135	Nemom	Rajeev Chandrasekhar	BJP	61,227	45.80	Shashi Tharoor	INC	39,101	29.26	Pannyan Raveendran	CPI	33,322	24.94	22,126
137	Parassala	Shashi Tharoor	INC	59,026	38.93	Pannyan Raveendran	CPI	46,654	30.77	Rajeev Chandrasekhar	BJP	45,957	30.30	12,372
139	Kovalam	Shashi Tharoor	INC	64,042	42.54	Rajeev Chandrasekhar	BJP	47,376	31.48	Pannyan Raveendran	CPI	39,137	26.00	16,666
140	Neyyattinkara	Shashi Tharoor	INC	58,749	45.09	Rajeev Chandrasekhar	BJP	36,136	27.68	Pannyan Raveendran	CPI	35,526	27.23	22,613

=== General election 2019 ===
There were 1,334,665 registered voters in Thiruvananthapuram Constituency for the 2019 Lok Sabha Election. The Constituency recorded a polling percentage of 73.45% of the total electorate.

==== Party wise Results ====
2019 Indian general election: Thiruvananthapuram
Party	Candidate	Votes	%	±%
INC	Dr. Shashi Tharoor	416,131	41.19	▲7.10
BJP	Kummanam Rajasekharan	316,142	31.30	▼1.02
CPI	C. Divakaran	258,556	25.60	▼2.90
NOTA	None of the Above	4,580	0.45	▲0.07
Margin of victory		99,989	9.89	▲8.12
Turnout		1,011,268	73.74	▲5.11
INC hold		Swing	▲7.10	

==== Legislative Assembly wise Results ====
No.	Assembly	1st Position	Party	Votes	%	2nd Position	Party	Votes	%	3rd Position	Party	Votes	%	NOTA	Margin
132	Kazhakootam	Shashi Tharoor	INC	46964	35.50%	K Rajasekharan	BJP	45479	34.38%	C. Divakaran	CPI	37688	28.49%	648	▲1385
133	Vattiyoorkavu	Shashi Tharoor	INC	53545	39.46%	K Rajasekharan	BJP	50709	37.37%	C. Divakaran	CPI	29414	21.67%	690	▲2836
134	Thiruvananthapuram	Shashi Tharoor	INC	57077	43.98%	K Rajasekharan	BJP	42877	33.08%	C. Divakaran	CPI	27530	21.23%	647	▲14200
135	Nemom	K Rajasekharan	BJP	58513	41.40%	Shashi Tharoor	INC	46472	32.88%	C. Divakaran	CPI	33921	24.00%	748	▼12041
137	Parassala	Shashi Tharoor	INC	69944	42.57%	C. Divakaran	CPI	47942	29.18%	K Rajasekharan	BJP	42887	26.10%	621	▲27057
139	Kovalam	Shashi Tharoor	INC	73221	45.65%	C. Divakaran	CPI	42050	26.22%	K Rajasekharan	BJP	41092	25.62%	616	▲32129
140	Neyyattinkara	Shashi Tharoor	INC	66834	47.71%	C. Divakaran	CPI	37925	27.07%	K Rajasekharan	BJP	32368	23.11%	583	▲34466

=== General Election 2014 ===
==== Party wise Results ====
2014 Indian general election: Thiruvananthapuram
Party	Candidate	Votes	%	±%
INC	Dr. Shashi Tharoor	297,806	34.09	▼10.20
BJP	O. Rajagopal	282,336	32.32	▲20.92
CPI	Bennet Abraham	248,941	28.50	▼2.24
AAP	Ajit Joy	14,153	1.62	N/A
SDPI	Kunnil Shajahan	4,820	0.55	N/A
NOTA	None of the Above	3,346	0.38	N/A
Margin of victory		15,470	1.77	▼11.78
Turnout		873,441	68.63	▲2.89
INC hold		Swing	▼10.20	

==== Legislative Assembly wise Results ====
No.	Assembly	1st Position	Party	Votes	%	2nd Position	Party	Votes	%	3rd Position	Party	Votes	%	NOTA	Margin
132	Kazhakootam	O. Rajagopal	BJP	41829	37.1%	Shashi Tharoor	INC	34220	30.4%	Bennet Abraham	CPI	31799	28.2%	483	▼7609
133	Vattiyoorkavu	O. Rajagopal	BJP	43589	37.1%	Shashi Tharoor	INC	40663	34.6%	Bennet Abraham	CPI	27504	23.4%	716	▼2926
134	Thiruvananthapuram	O. Rajagopal	BJP	40835	36.0%	Shashi Tharoor	INC	39027	34.4%	Bennet Abraham	CPI	27385	24.1%	578	▼1808
135	Nemom	O. Rajagopal	BJP	50685	42.1%	Shashi Tharoor	INC	32639	27.1%	Bennet Abraham	CPI	31643	26.3%	523	▼18046
137	Parassala	Shashi Tharoor	INC	50360	34.8%	Bennet Abraham	CPI	47953	33.2%	O. Rajagopal	BJP	39753	27.5%	357	▲10607
139	Kovalam	Shashi Tharoor	INC	51401	37.7%	Bennet Abraham	CPI	42112	30.9%	O. Rajagopal	BJP	36169	26.5%	347	▲15232
140	Neyyattinkara	Shashi Tharoor	INC	48009	39.3%	Bennet Abraham	CPI	39806	32.6%	O. Rajagopal	BJP	28958	23.7%	336	▲19051

=== General Election 2009 ===
2009 Indian general election: Thiruvananthapuram
Party	Candidate	Votes	%	±%
INC	Shashi Tharoor	326,725	44.29	▲2.65
CPI	P. Ramachandran Nair	226,727	30.74	▼20.66
BSP	A. Neelalohithadasan Nadar	86,233	11.69	N/A
BJP	P. K. Krishna Das	84,094	11.40	▲6.57
NCP	M. P. Gangadharan	2,972	0.40	
Margin of victory		99,998	13.55	▲34.77
Turnout		737,641	65.74	▼2.81
INC gain from CPI		Swing	▲45.26	

=== By-Election 2005 ===
By-Election, 2005: Thiruvananthapuram
Party	Candidate	Votes	%	±%
CPI	Pannyan Raveendran	390,324	51.41	▲13.96
INC	V. S. Sivakumar	316,124	41.64	▲11.34
BJP	C. K. Padmanabhan	36,690	4.83	▼25.03
Margin of victory		74,200	9.77	+35.89
Turnout		859,237	68.13	−0.66
CPI hold		Swing	+36.45	

=== General Election 2004 ===
2004 Indian general election: Thiruvananthapuram
Party	Candidate	Votes	%	±%
CPI	P. K. Vasudevan Nair	286,057	37.45	▲1.22
INC	V. S. Sivakumar	231,454	30.30	▼7.85
BJP	O. Rajagopal	228,052	29.86	▲8.93
Margin of victory		54,603	7.15	▲5.24
Turnout		864,317	68.7	▲5.52
CPI gain from INC		Swing	24.18%	

=== General Election 1999 ===
1999 Indian general election: Thiruvananthapuram
Party	Candidate	Votes	%	±%
INC	V. S. Sivakumar	288,390	38.15	▼6.2
CPI	Kaniyapuram Ramachandran	273,905	36.23	▼6.1
BJP	O. Rajagopal	158,221	20.93	▲8.54
Margin of victory		14,485	1.91	▼0.1
Turnout		757,497	63.18%	▼2.56
INC hold		Swing	-14.53%	

=== General Election 1998 ===
1998 Indian general election: Thiruvananthapuram
Party	Candidate	Votes	%	±%
INC	K. Karunakaran	337,429	44.35%	▲2.92
CPI	K.V. Surendranath	322,031	42.33	▼2.05
BJP	Kerala Varma Raja	94,303	12.39	▲1.76
Margin of victory		15,398	2.01	
Turnout		766,775	65.74	
INC gain from CPI		Swing		

=== General Election 1996 ===
1996 Indian general election: Thiruvananthapuram
Party	Candidate	Votes	%	±%
CPI	K.V. Surendranath	312,622	44.38	
INC	A. Charles	291,820	41.43	
BJP	K. Raman Pillai	74,904	10.63	
Margin of victory		20,802	2.95	
Turnout		721,087	64.56	
CPI gain from INC		Swing		

=== General Election 1991 ===
1991 Indian general election: Thiruvananthapuram
Party	Candidate	Votes	%	±%
INC	A. Charles	334,272	46.99	
CPI	E. J. Vijayamma	290,602	40.85	
BJP	O. Rajagopal	80,566	11.33	
Margin of victory		43,670	6.14	
Turnout		721,412	68.89	
INC hold		Swing		

=== General Election 1989 ===
1989 Indian general election: Thiruvananthapuram
Party	Candidate	Votes	%	±%
INC	A. Charles	367,825	49.02	
CPI	O. N. V. Kurup	326,912	42.23	
BJP	P. Asok Kumar	56,046	7.47	
Margin of victory		50,913	6.79	
Turnout		754,853	73.78	
INC hold		Swing		

=== General Election 1984 ===
1984 Indian general election: Thiruvananthapuram
Party	Candidate	Votes	%	±%
INC	A. Charles	239,791	43.00	
LKD	Neelalohithadasan Nadar	186,353	33.41	−27%
Hindu Munnani (KL)	Kerala Varma Raja	110,449	19.80	
Independent	Madhavikutty	1,786	0.32	
Margin of victory		53,438	9.58	
Turnout		561984	71.70	
INC hold		Swing		

=== General Election 1980 ===
1980 Indian general election: Thiruvananthapuram
Party	Candidate	Votes	%	±%
INC	Neelalohithadasan Nadar	273,818	60.90	
CPI	M. N. Govindan Nair	166,761	37.09	
Margin of victory		107,057	23.81	
Turnout		453,458	63.44	
INC gain from CPI		Swing		

=== General Election 1977 ===
1977 Indian general election: Thiruvananthapuram
Party	Candidate	Votes	%	±%
CPI	M. N. Govindan Nair	244,277	56.32	
JP	P. Vishwambharan	174,455	40.22	
Margin of victory		69,822	16.1	
Turnout		448,586	72.14	
CPI gain from Independent		Swing		

=== General Election 1971 ===
1971 Indian general election: Thiruvananthapuram
Party	Candidate	Votes	%	±%
Independent	V. K. Krishna Menon	167,872	52.99	
PSP	D. Damodaran Potti	143,745	45.38	
Margin of victory		24,127	7.56	
Turnout		318,883	59.76	
Independent gain from SSP		Swing		

=== General Election 1967 ===
1967 Indian general election: Thiruvananthapuram
Party	Candidate	Votes	%	±%
SSP	P. Viswambharan	153,040	47.4	
INC	G.C. Pillai	148,562	46.0	
Margin of victory		4,478	1.4	
Turnout		310,998	67.9	
SSP gain from Independent		Swing		

== See also ==
- Indian general election, 2014 (Kerala)
- 2014 Indian general election
