= M. V. Nikesh Kumar =

Indian journalist and politician

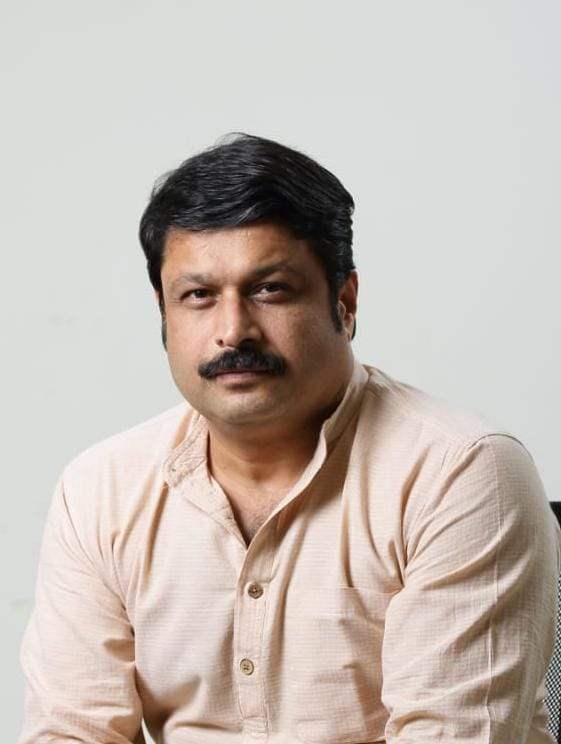
- Born: Melathu Veettil Nikesh Kumar; 7 October 1973 (age 53); Kannur, Kerala, India
- Years active: 1996 to 2024
- Known for: Founder: Reporter TV
- Title: Member, CPI(M) Kannur District Committee
- Political party: Communist Party of India (Marxist)
- Spouse: Rani Varghese (m. 2004)
- Children: Sankaran Nikesh; Janaki Teresa Nikesh
- Parents: M. V. Raghavan; Janaki Chenichery
- Awards: Ramnath Goenka Award

Melathu Veettil Nikesh Kumar (born 28 May 1973) or MVN is an Indian politician from Kerala. He was also a journalist for 28 years and quit to become active in politics. He is also a member of the CPI(M). He had contested the 2016 assembly polls from Azhikode Assembly constituency and lost for 2,287 votes.

== Personal life ==
Nikesh Kumar hais from Burnassery, Kannur. He is the youngest son of the late CMP leader and former minister M. V. Raghavan and Janaki. He is married to Rani Varghese. The couple has two children: Sankaran Nikesh, Janaki Teresa Nikesh.

== Career ==
After graduating in English literature from Mar Ivanios College, Thiruvananthapuram, and completing a PG Diploma in Journalism from the Institute of Journalism, Press Club, Thiruvananthapuram, Nikesh Kumar began his career as a news anchor and has worked with major Malayalam news channels, such as Asianet News and Indiavision. His career trajectory took a significant turn when he became the Managing Director of Reporter TV.

In 2010, he left Indiavision and he started new news channel Reporter TV. He was one of the founders of the channel and joined as MD. He anchored 'Editor's Hour' aired every day at 9 pm. Nikesh Kumar has been recognized for his contributions to the media industry, receiving various accolades, including the Ramnath Goenka Award.

MV Nikesh Kumar was the Editor-in-Chief of Reporter TV. He resigned on 25 June 2024 from the official positions of the channel. He took such a decision to work actively in the political arena.

== Awards ==
He has received several awards, including Ramnath Goenka Excellence in Journalism Awards and Shifa Al Jazeera Media Award.
