= Kadakampally Surendran =

Indian politician (born 1954)

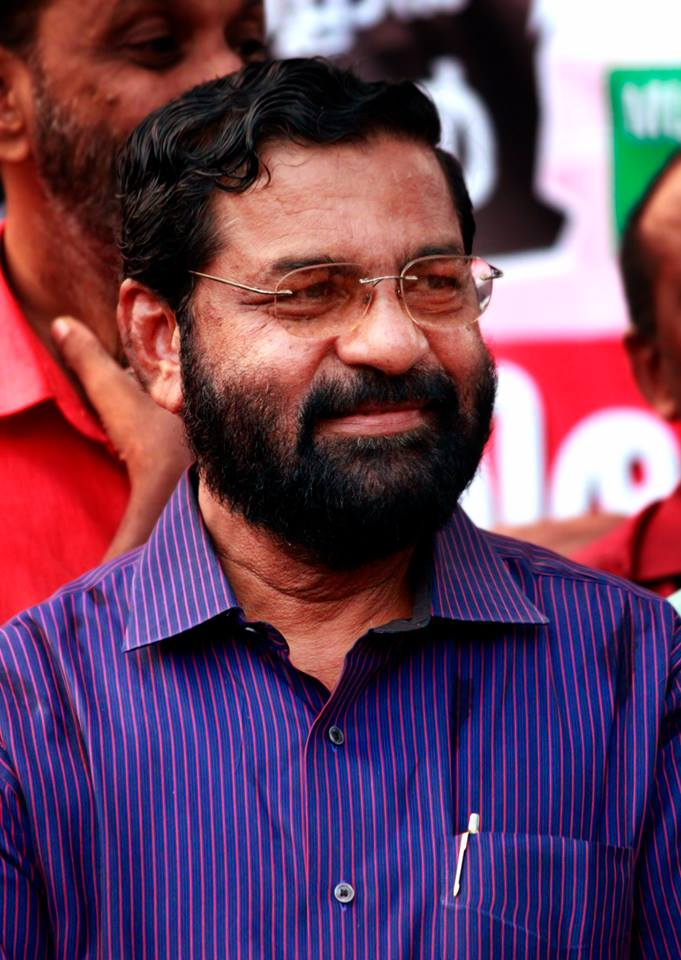

Minister for Co-Operation, Tourism and Devaswom, Government of Kerala
- In office 25 May 2016 – 3 May 2021
- Preceded by: C. N. Balakrishnan (Minister for Co-operation); A. P. Anil Kumar (Minister for Tourism); V. S. Sivakumar (Minister for Devaswom)
- Succeeded by: V. N. Vasavan (Minister for Co-operation); P. A. Mohammed Riyas (Minister for Tourism); K. Radhakrishnan (Minister for Devaswom)

Member of the Kerala Legislative Assembly
- In office 25 May 2016 – 4 May 2026
- Preceded by: M. A. Vaheed
- Succeeded by: V. Muraleedharan
- Constituency: Kazhakkoottam

Minister for Electricity, Government of Kerala
- In office 25 May 2016 – 29 November 2016
- Preceded by: Aryadan Muhammed
- Succeeded by: M. M. Mani

Thiruvananthapuram District Committee Secretary of the Communist Party of India (Marxist)
- In office 2007 – 2016
- Preceded by: Pirappancode Murali

Member of the Kerala Legislative Assembly
- In office 1996 – 2001
- Preceded by: M. V. Raghavan
- Succeeded by: M. A. Vaheed
- Constituency: Kazhakkoottam

Personal details
- Born: K. Surendran; 12 October 1954 (age 71) Thiruvananthapuram, Kerala, India
- Party: Communist Party of India (Marxist)
- Spouse: Sulekha Surendran
- Children: Arun Surendran, Anoop Surendran
- Parents: C. K. Krishnan Kutty; Bhagavathi Kutty

Kadakampally Surendran (born 12 October 1954) is an Indian politician, who served as the Minister for Co-Operation, Tourism, and Devaswom in the first Pinarayi Vijayan ministry (2016–2021) of the Government of Kerala. He was the Thiruvananthapuram District Committee Secretary of the Communist Party of India (Marxist) for nearly a decade (2007–2016).

A member of the Communist Party of India (Marxist), he is presently a member of the Kerala state committee of the party. He is also an elected representative in the 15th Kerala legislative assembly from the Kazhakkoottam assembly constituency in the Thiruvananthapuram district.

Surendran has been a prominent figure of the CPI(M) and other leftist progressive movements in the district of Thiruvananthapuram for more than four decades.

== Early life and education ==
Born as the son of C. K. Krishnan Kutty and Bhagavathi Kutty on 12 October 1954 at Kadakampally of Thiruvananthapuram district, Surendran had his education from Sambhuvattom Lower Primary School, Madhavapuram Upper Primary School, St. Joseph High School, S N College, Chempazhanthy, and University College, Thiruvananthapuram.

== Personal life ==
He is married to Sulekha Surendran and has two children, Arun and Anoop. His wife Sulekha is a retired high school teacher from AMHSS, Thirumala, Thiruvananthapuram. Surendran and his wife currently reside at Karikkakom, Thiruvananthapuram.

== Political life ==
At school, he was active in student movements and cultural activities. He came to the political front and social activities from his constant association with youth organizations and library movements.

In 1974, he became a CPI(M) member. He served the party as its secretary, Anayara Branch, secretary, Local Committee Pettah, secretary, Vanchiyur Area Committee, member, District Committee Thiruvananthapuram, and secretary, District Committee Thiruvananthapuram. In 2008, he was elected to the Kerala State Committee of the CPI(M) in its 19th State Conference held at Kottayam.

== Other mass organizations ==
He is also a forerunner in trade union activities in the state of Kerala. He is a member of the National Council of the Centre of Indian Trade Unions (CITU), a socialist organisation of trade unions in India. He is the office-bearer of many state-level trade unions, including the All India Road Transport Workers Federation (AIRTWF), the Kerala Bank Employees Federation (KBEF), and the Keltron Employees Association (KEA). Previously, he was the office bearer of the K.S.F.D.C. Employees Union, the C-DIT Employees Association, the Co-operative Academy of Professional Education (CAPE) Employees Union, the Titanium General Labour Union, and SPATO, to name a few.

== Parliamentary positions held ==
1. Member of the 15th Legislative Assembly of Kerala with a margin of more than 24000 votes from Kazhakuttom constituency (May 2021).
2. Member of the 14th Legislative Assembly of Kerala with a margin of nearly 7500 votes from Kazhakuttom constituency (May 2016) and served as Co-Operation, Tourism, and Devaswom minister from 25 May 2016 – 20 May 2021.
3. President of the Kerala State Co-Operative Bank (2006–2008).
4. President of the Thiruvananthapuram District Library Council (1995–2010).
5. Elected twice to the Syndicate of the University of Kerala (2006 & 2014).
6. Member of 10th Legislative Assembly of Kerala with a margin of more than 24000 votes from Kazhakuttom constituency and was the chairman of Backward Caste Welfare Committee (1996–2001).
7. Member of the first district council (Thiruvananthapuram) with a mammoth margin from the Pettah division (1990–1991).
8. Vice-President of the Kadakampally Grama Panchayat (1977–1982), his native place.
