= Thiruvananthapuram Assembly constituency =

Thiruvananthapuram Central
- Constituency No. 134 for the Kerala Legislative Assembly
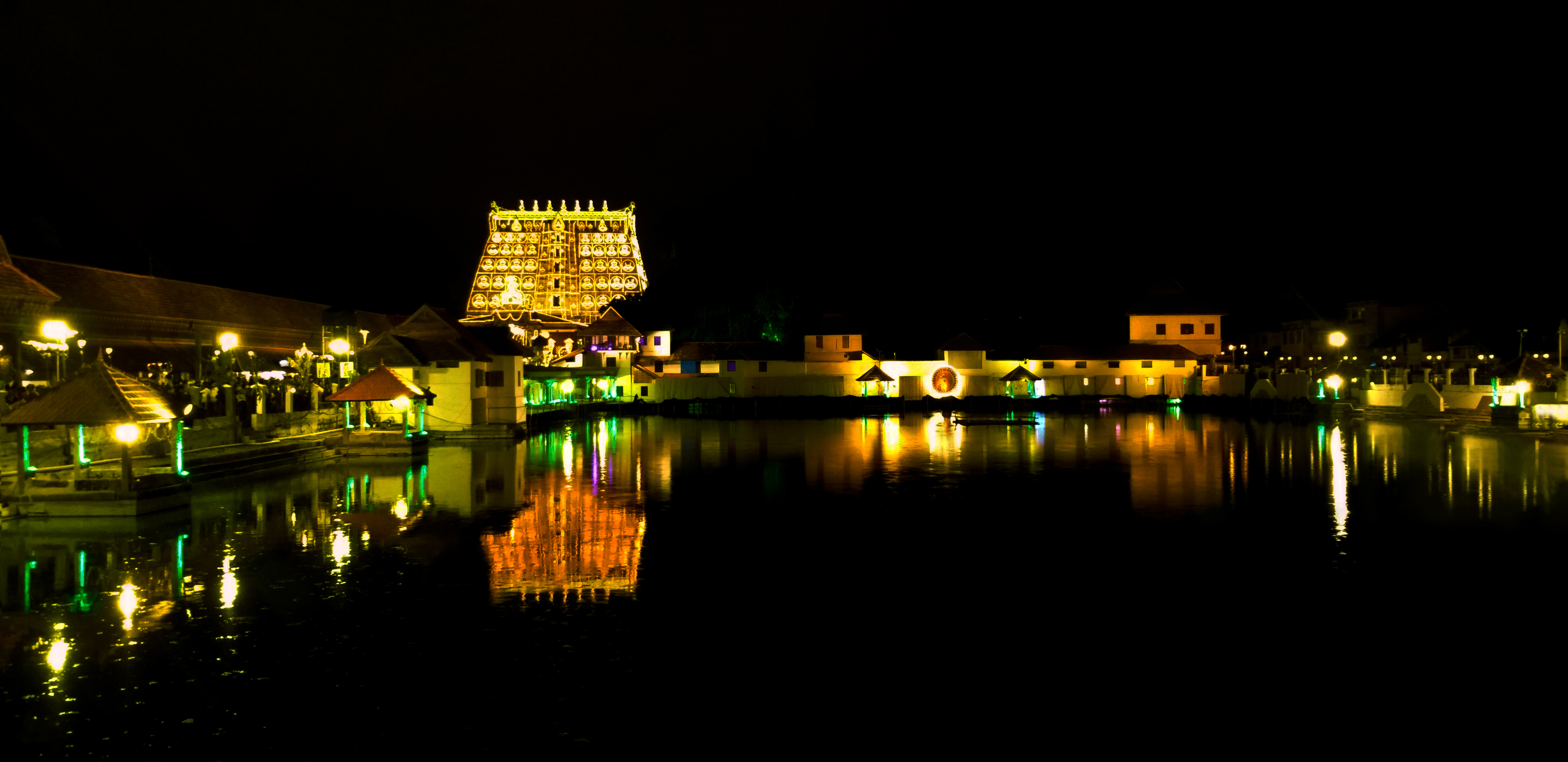
- Sree Padmanabhaswamy Temple,Located In Thiruvananthapuram Central Constituency

Constituency details
- Country: India
- Region: South India
- State: Kerala
- District: Thiruvananthapuram
- Lok Sabha constituency: Thiruvananthapuram
- Established: 2008
- Total electors: 2,03,584 (2021)
- Reservation: None

Member of Legislative Assembly
- 16th Kerala Legislative Assembly
- Incumbent C. P. John
- Party: CMP
- Alliance: UDF
- Elected year: 2026

Thiruvananthapuram Central Assembly constituency is one of the 140 state legislative assembly constituencies in Kerala, India. It is one of the seven assembly segments that constitute the Thiruvananthapuram Lok Sabha constituency.

Thiruvananthapuram Assembly constituency was established by the 2008 delimitation. Before, it was known as Trivandrum West Assembly Constituency from 1977 to 2008, and Trivandrum-I Assembly constituency from 1957 to 1977.

== Local self-governed segments ==
Thiruvananthapuram Assembly constituency is composed of the following local self-governed segments:

Sl no.	Name	Ward no.	Status (Grama panchayat/Municipality/Municipal Corporation)	Taluk
1	Thiruvananthapuram	Including kunnukuzhi,thampanoor,palayam, Valiyathura, Shankumugham, Beemapalli, Vazhuthacaud, Vanchiyoor,Thaicaud, Poonthura, petta, Eastfort, chakka.	Municipal Corporation	Thiruvananthapuram

== Members of Legislative Assembly ==
The following list contains all members of Kerala Legislative Assembly who have represented Thiruvananthapuram Assembly constituency during the period of various assemblies:

=== Thiruvananthapuram-I ===
Election	Member	Party
1957	E. P. Eapen	Praja Socialist Party
1960	E. P. Eapen	Praja Socialist Party
1967	B. M. Nair	Samyukta Socialist Party
1970	N. Gopala Pillai	Praja Socialist Party

=== Thiruvananthapuram West ===
Election	Member	Party
1977	K. Pankajakshan	Revolutionary Socialist Party (India)
1980	P. A. Muhammad Kannu	Indian Union Muslim League
1982	P. A. Muhammad Kannu	Indian Union Muslim League
1987	M. M. Hassan	Indian National Congress
1991	M. M. Hassan	Indian National Congress
1996	Antony Raju	Kerala Congress
2001	M. V. Raghavan	Communist Marxist Party
2006	V. Surendran Pillai	Kerala Congress

=== Thiruvananthapuram ===
Election	Member	Party
2011	V. S. Sivakumar	Indian National Congress
2016	V. S. Sivakumar	Indian National Congress
2021	Adv. Antony Raju	Janadhipathya Kerala Congress
2026	C. P. John	Communist Marxist Party

== Election results ==
Vote share of winning candidates
2026	37.83%
2021	38.01%
2016	36.82%
2011	45.87%

Percentage change (±%) denotes the change in the number of votes from the immediate previous election.

=== 2026 ===
There were 1,58,826 registered voters in Thiruvananthapuram Central assembly constituency for the 2026 legislative assembly election. LDF candidate Sudheer Karamana contested the election as an independent candidate.

2026 Kerala Legislative Assembly election: Thiruvananthapuram
Party	Candidate	Votes	%	±%
CMP	C. P. John	45,586	37.83	−
Independent	Sudheer Karamana	35,723	29.65	−
BJP	Karamana Jayan	35,125	29.15	▲1.86
NOTA	None of the above	909	0.75	▼0.07
Margin of victory		9,863	8.18	▲2.61
Turnout		1,20,488	75.86	▲10.83
CMP gain from JKC		Swing	-	

=== 2021 ===
There were 2,03,584 registered voters in the Thiruvananthapuram constituency for the 2021 Kerala Assembly election.

2021 Kerala Legislative Assembly election: Thiruvananthapuram
Party	Candidate	Votes	%	±%
JKC	Adv. Antony Raju	48,748	38.01	▲9.83
INC	V. S. Sivakumar	41,669	32.49	▼4.33
BJP	Krishnakumar G.	34,996	27.29	▼0.25
NOTA	None of the Above	1054	0.82	▼0.32
Independent	Abhilash Vadakkan	436	0.34	–
SUCI(C)	A. Saboora	366	0.29	▼0.02
Independent	Raju Antony	289	0.23	–
Independent	Chala Mohanan D.	245	0.19	–
Independent	Antony Raju S/o Raju	190	0.15	–
Independent	Sivakumar K. S/o Kumara Swamy	164	0.13	–
Independent	Krishnakumar T. S. S/o Sankarankutty	89	0.07	–
Majority		7,089	5.57	▼3.07
Turnout		1,28,322	63.03	▼2.33
JKC gain from INC		Swing	▲9.83	

=== 2016 ===
There were 1,93,101 registered voters in the Thiruvananthapuram constituency for the 2016 Kerala Assembly election.

2016 Kerala Legislative Assembly election: Thiruvananthapuram
Party	Candidate	Votes	%	±%
INC	V. S. Sivakumar	46,474	36.82	▼9.05
JKC	Adv. Antony Raju	35,569	28.18	–
BJP	S. Sreesanth	34,764	27.54	▲16.78
AIADMK	Dr. Biju Ramesh	5,762	4.57	
NOTA	None of the Above	1,435	1.14	–
Independent	Nandavanam Suseelan	450	0.36	–
Independent	Antony Raju New Colony	424	0.34	–
BSP	Mohanambika D.	398	0.32	–
SUCI(C)	P. S. Gopakumar	344	0.27	▲0.05
Independent	Sivakumar Raveendran Nair	208	0.16	–
Independent	Praveen Arimbrathodiyil	170	0.13	–
Independent	M. S. Subi	113	0.09	–
Independent	Sivakumar Pushkaran	101	0.08	–
Majority		10,905	8.64	▲3.64
Turnout		1,26,212	65.36	▲5.01
INC hold		Swing	▼9.05	

=== 2011 ===
There were ,1,77,442 registered voters in the Thiruvananthapuram constituency for the 2011 Kerala Assembly election.

2011 Kerala Legislative Assembly election: Thiruvananthapuram
Party	Candidate	Votes	%	±%
INC	V. S. Sivakumar	49,122	45.87	
KEC	V. Surendran Pillai	43,770	40.87	
BJP	B. K. Sekhar	11,519	10.76	
SDPI	Abdu Razak A.	807	0.75	
Independent	P. Surendran Pillai	518	0.48	
Independent	S. Sivakumar	485	0.45	
SUCI(C)	P. S. Gopakumar	235	0.22	
Independent	N. Sivakumar	221	0.21	
Independent	Sundaran Pillai	207	0.19	
Independent	C. Vasantha Kumar	110	0.10	
Independent	George Mankidan	98	0.09	
Majority		5,352	5.00	
Turnout		1,07,092	60.35	
INC win (new seat)				

== See also ==
- Thiruvananthapuram
- Thiruvananthapuram district
- List of constituencies of the Kerala Legislative Assembly
- 2016 Kerala Legislative Assembly election
