= Reporter TV =

Reporter TV Reporter Live
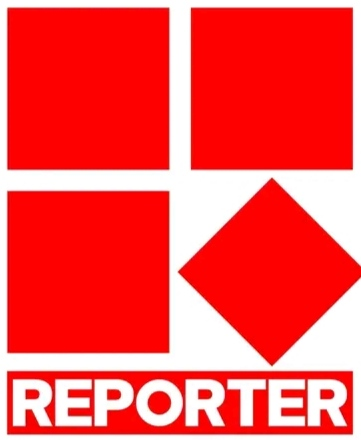
- Logo used since 2023
- Country: India
- Broadcast area: Kerala
- Network: Reporter News
- Headquarters: Kochi, Kerala, India

Programming
- Language: Malayalam
- Picture format: 1080p (Full HD)

Ownership
- Owner: Reporter Broadcasting Company Limited
- Key people: Jose Kadayilthattila John (Managing director); Dr. Arun Kumar (Chief Editor); Smruthy Paruthikad (Executive Editor); Anto Augustine (Managing Editor); Mathu Saji (Coordinating Editor); PR Sunil (Regional Head); Anil Emmanuel (Head- Special Stories)

History
- Launched: 13 May 2011; 15 years ago
- Founder: M. V. Nikesh Kumar

Links
- Website: reporterlive.com

Availability

Streaming media
- YouTube: Reporter Live

Reporter TV or Reporter Live is an Indian Malayalam-language free-to-air news channel currently operated by Reporter News Network owned by Reporter Broadcasting Company, based at Kochi. The news channel was launched on 13 May 2011 with M. V. Nikesh Kumar, a popular media person in Kerala, as the CEO of the channel.

Anil Ayroor joined the Reporter Broadcasting Company as president in 2023. It is the flagship news channel of Reporter Broadcasting Company. The channel underwent a brand revamp on 1 July 2023. Anil Ayroor left the channel to start a new venture - Big TV 24x7 Malayalam.
