= V. S. Sivakumar =

Indian politician

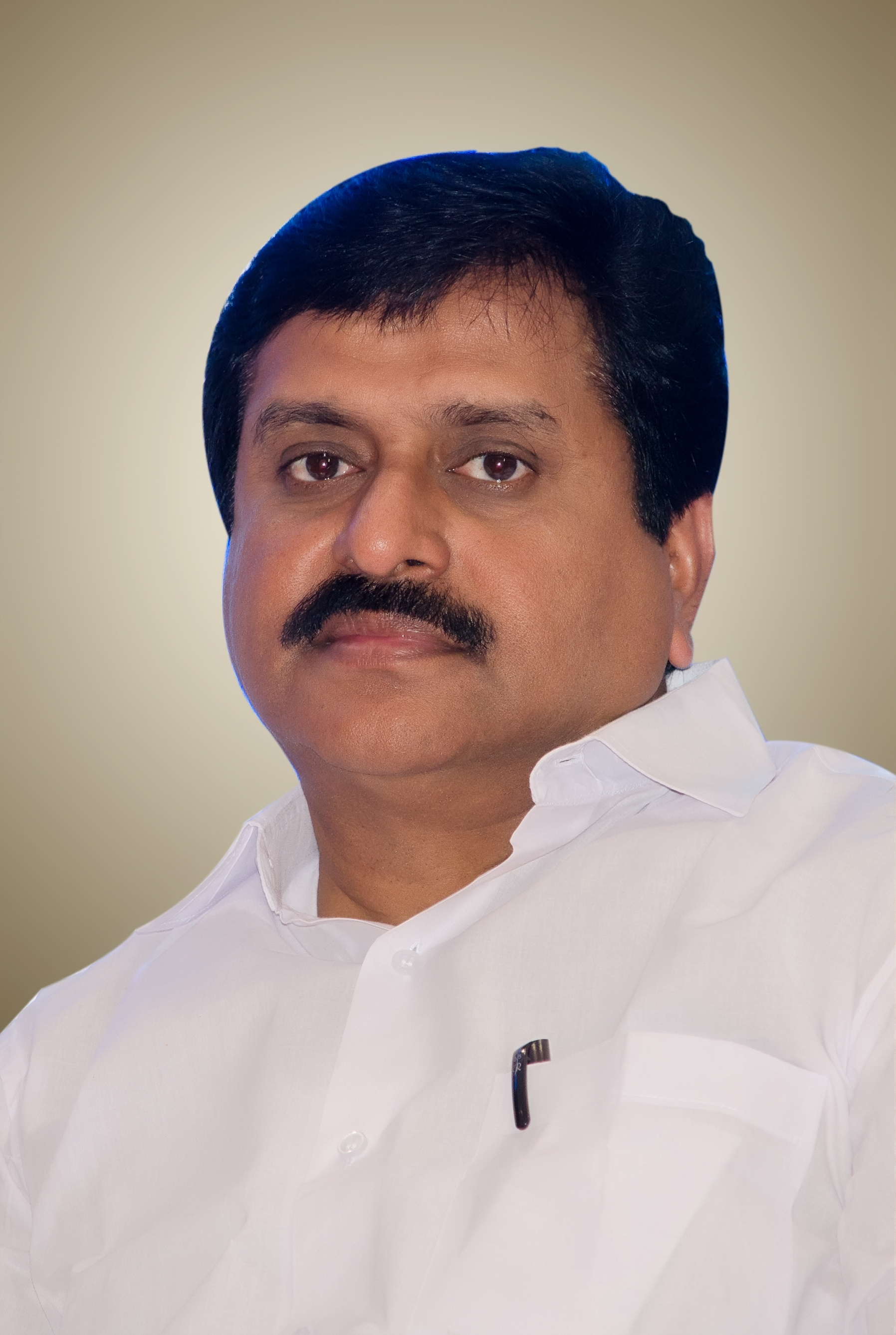

Member of Kerala Legislative Assembly
- In office 13 May 2011 – 2 May 2021
- Preceded by: constituency created
- Succeeded by: Antony Raju
- Constituency: Thiruvananthapuram

Minister for Health, Kerala
- In office 12 April 2012 – 20 May 2016
- Preceded by: Adoor Prakash
- Succeeded by: K. K. Shailaja

Minister for Devaswom, Kerala
- In office 23 May 2011 – 20 May 2016
- Preceded by: Kadannappalli Ramachandran
- Succeeded by: Kadakampally Surendran

Minister for Transport, Kerala
- In office 23 May 2011 – 12 April 2012
- Preceded by: Jose Thettayil
- Succeeded by: Aryadan Muhammed

Member of Parliament, Lok Sabha
- In office 6 October 1999 – 16 May 2004
- Preceded by: K. Karunakaran
- Succeeded by: P. K. Vasudevan Nair
- Constituency: Thiruvananthapuram

Personal details
- Born: 30 May 1960 (age 66) Amaravila, Thiruvananthapuram, Kerala, India
- Party: Indian National Congress
- Spouse: Sindhu Salooja C. R.
- Children: 2
- As of 26 October, 2012 Source: kerala.gov.in

V. Sadasivan Nair Sivakumar (born 30 May 1960) is an Indian politician who is a member of Indian National Congress and a former Minister for Health, Family Welfare and Devaswom, Government of Kerala in the Second Oommen Chandy ministry. He has represented the Thiruvananthapuram Assembly constituency in Kerala from 2011 Assembly election in Kerala to 2021. He was a member of the 13th Lok Sabha representing Thiruvananthapuram Lok Sabha constituency.

== Early life ==
V. S. Sivakumar was born to K. V. Sadasivan Nair and B. Subhadra Amma at Amaravila near Neyyattinkara on 30 May 1960. He has completed BSc from Velu Thampi Memorial Nair Service Society College, Dhanuvachapuram, Thiruvananthapuram and LLB from Kerala Law Academy, Thiruvananthapuram. He married Sindhu Salooja C.R., they have two daughters and live near Sasthamangalam, Thiruvananthapuram.

== Political life ==
V. S. Sivakumar started his political career through the Kerala Students Union (KSU) in 1978 and rose through the Youth Congress. He was elected the Chairman, Students' Union, V.T.M.N.S.S. College, Dhanuvachapuram, Trivandrum in 1979–80. He served as Indian National Congress DCC President, AICC Member, KPCC Member and general secretary. He was the elected Member of Parliament in the 13th Lok Sabha representing Thiruvananthapuram Parliamentary Constituency.

Positions held

- 1978-1979 University Union Councillor (Kerala University)
- 1980-1982 General Secretary, Block Congress Committee
- 1982-1987 President, Block Youth Congress, Parasala Block, District Trivandrum
- 1987-1993 Vice-President, District Youth Congress Committee, Trivandrum
- 1993-2000 President, District Youth Congress, Trivandrum
- 1999-2004 Elected to 13th Lok Sabha
- 1999-2000 Member, Committee on Science and Technology, Environment and Forests

V. S. Sivakumar was elected as the Member of Parliament to the 13th Lok Sabha for the first time in 1999 by defeating Kaniyapuram Ramachandran of CPI with a margin of 14,385 votes from Thiruvananthapuram (Lok Sabha constituency). He represented the constituency till 2004 in the Lok Sabha. But in the 14th Lok Sabha elections in 2004 and by-election in 2005, he tasted defeat against P. K. Vasudevan Nair and Pannyan Raveendran of CPI, respectively, from the Thiruvananthapuram Constituency.

Sivakumar was fielded for the first time in the 2011 State Assembly election from Thiruvananthapuram constituency. He emerged victorious against the former Minister V. Surendran Pillai of Kerala Congress (Anti-merger Group) by a margin of 5352 votes.

Sivakumar was sworn in as a minister in Kerala for the first time on 18 May 2011, as the Minister for Transport and Devaswom in the Oommen Chandy Ministry 2011-2016. Later in the first cabinet reshuffle, he was made the Minister for Health, Family Welfare and Devaswom. His portfolio included Health, Family Welfare, Medical Education, Medical University, Indigenous Medicines, Drug Control, Homoeopathy, Naturopathy and Devaswoms.

He was booked by Vigilance and Anti-Corruption Bureau (VACB) of Kerala on 27 February 2020 for illegally acquiring money via his close associates between 2011 and 2016.

== See also ==
- Government of Kerala
- Kerala Ministers
