= All India Centre for Trade Unions =

Indian trade union

All India Centre for Trade Unions was a trade union centre in Kerala, India. It was the labour wing of the Communist Marxist Party. M.K. Kannan was the Kerala State President of AICTU. In June 2007, AICTU merged into the Hind Mazdoor Sabha. At the time, AICTU claimed to have 150 000 members.
