= M. A. Vaheed =

Indian politician (born 1950)

Adv. M.A. Vaheed

Member of Legislative Assembly
- In office 2001–2016
- Preceded by: Kadakampally Surendran
- Succeeded by: Kadakampally Surendran
- Constituency: Kazhakoottam

Personal details
- Born: 14 March 1950 (age 76) Kaniyapuram, Thiruvananthapuram, India
- Party: Indian National Congress
- Spouse: Illiba Vaheed
- Children: Ginsa Vaheed; Rinsa Vaheed
- Profession: Politician, lawyer, social worker
- Website: www.mavaheed.com

Adv. M.A. Vaheed (born 14 March 1950) is an Indian politician and advocate from Kerala. He belongs to the Indian National Congress and was the MLA for Kazhakkuttom in the Kerala Legislative Assembly for 15 years.

== Political career ==
Vaheed entered politics through KSU, the students' wing of Indian National Congress in Kerala. He served as the taluk secretary, district vice president, and the district general secretary of KSU. He took an active role in the private college strike in the 1970s and was expelled from Sree Narayana College, Chempazhanthy. He later joined NSS College, Nilamel and continued studies.

Vaheed became the president of the Thiruvananthapuram district Youth Congress in 1978, Kaniyapuram Coir Co-operative Society from 1983 to 1989, Andoorkonam Service Co-operative Bank in 1993, and KANFED in 1985. He played a major hand in organising trade unions affiliated with INTUC. He started Youth Express Daily in 1983.

Vaheed also served as the general secretary of Thiruvananthapuram District Congress Committee, member of Governing Body and Accounts Committee of Agricultural University, chairman of Councillor and Opposition Leader of Thiruvananthapuram Corporation. He became a member of the Thiruvananthapuram District Planning Board in 1995. He was elected to the Kerala Sports Council in 2008.

Vaheed first became an MLA in 2001 as a UDF rebel candidate. After the win, he rejoined Congress party. He contested the state assembly elections in 2006 and 2011 to complete a hat-trick of wins. In the 2016 Assembly elections, he lost to Communist Party of India (Marxist)'s Kadakampally Surendran by a margin of 11,477 votes. Vaheed came third overall, behind BJP's V. Muraleedharan.

== Personal life ==
Vaheed was born in Kaniyapuram on 14 March 1950 to Muhammad Kassim and Muhammad Ummal. He graduated in Science and then took LL.B. and practised as an advocate. He is married to Illiba Vaheed and they have two daughters.

He has six elder brothers (Rasheed, Azeez, Gafoor, Shukoor, Sathar, Vahab) and a sister (Hafsa Beevi).

== See also ==
- Kerala Legislature
