= Bennet Abraham =

Indian anesthesiologist

Dr. J Bennet Abraham is an Indian anaesthesiologist and a former Member of the Kerala Public Service Commission.

== Early life ==
Bennet Abraham was born to John Wycliff and Kamala Bai at Sreekaryam, a village situated few kilometers away from Trivandrum city; where they made their living as farmers. Abraham did his schooling at Loyola School, Trivandrum and completed his pre degree from St. Xaviers College, Thumba. He got his degree in Bsc Chemistry from Mar Ivanios College, Trivandrum. Then he went on to do his under graduate (1979 Batch) and post graduate medical education from Christian Medical College, Vellore. He was a well known middle and long-distance athlete, having set various records, in his school and college days. Abraham is the eldest of four children; he has one brother and two sisters.

== Medical career ==
Abraham joined, in 1986, a mission hospital belonging to the Church of South India, situated at Karakonam, a place 40 km away from Trivandrum. At that time, the hospital was in a dying phase with zero inpatients and a total of four staff members. Dr. Bennet Abraham, over the years that followed, was instrumental in reviving the hospital back to a working phase. He was joined by his wife Dr. Jemela Thomas, in 1988, who had then completed her DGO from Madras Medical College. They both left to CMC Vellore, in 1990, to do their Masters, only to return to Karakonam, in 1994. From then on, it was an uphill climb for the Mission Hospital. With assistance from the Albany Medical Team (Georgia), CBM (Germany) and few other charitable organizations, Abraham, who took over as medical superintendent, was able to steer the growth of the hospital into a medical college by the year 2002. Dr. Somervell Memorial CSI Medical College and Hospital, as it was then named, is now a 650 bedded post graduate charitable medical institution, owned by the South Kerala Diocese, wherein a total of over 250 medical, nursing and paramedical students graduate every year.

== Politics ==
Dr. Bennet Abraham was nominated by the Communist Party of India (CPI) as the LDF candidate for the Indian Parliament elections from the Thiruvananthapuram constituency, which was held on 10 April 2014. Shashi Tharoor of the Congress Party (INC) won the election after a close battle with O. Rajagopal of the Bharatiya Janata Party (BJP), who finished at second position. Abraham finished third with a total of 2,48,941 votes (28.50%).

== Personal life ==
Abraham is married to Dr.Jemela Thomas – MBBS, MD, DGO, Gynaecologist, CSI Rural Health Centre, Thiruvananthapuram. They currently reside at their house in Sreekaryam. They have two children, Dr. Nivin Bennet and Dr. Divya Bennet

== Social work ==
Dr. Bennet Abraham is a founding member and trustee of the Swasthi Charitable Foundation; a humanitarian organization based in Kerala. He is also a member of the advisory council of the World Anglican Health Board. Abraham is an active member of the CSI synod; he also served as a member of the executive committee (2010-2014) of the Communion of Churches in India. Under his leadership, several annual health programs were instituted in the rural and coastal areas of Thiruvananthapuram District. Some of them are the Community Eye Care Service, which ensures about 3500-4000 free cataract surgeries for the poor every year, the Community Cancer Centre Clinic and the Multidisciplinary clinic for the disabled.

== Awards and honors ==
1. Honoured by Centre for Rehabilitation of the Disabled - Trivandrum for selfless service, 2000

2. Honoured by Rotary Club of Trivandrum – Rural Selfless Service – 2004

3. Best Project partner award – Christopher Blinden Mission 2006 for work among the cataract patients

4. Best Project partner award – HelpAge India – 2007 for work among the elderly geriatric population.

5. Best Project Partner Award – Christoffel Blinden Mission (Preventable Blindness & Deafness Control Project) – 2008

6. Dr. Abraham P Koshy Memorial Jana Chethana Award – YMCA – 2014

7. Good Samaritan Award – Awarded by World Literature Forum & Christian Press Association. (The Award is in recognition for selfless services given to poor people) – 2023

8. Samagra Seva Puraskaram – This Award given to the Health contributions for the poor people - Kerala Kaumudi Trust.

9. Kalam’s World Records, An ISO 9001 – 2015 Certified Organization – Certificate of Appreciation – 2024 for work among mentally challenged children.

10. Lionize World Records, An ISO 9001 – 2015 Certified Organization – Certificate of Appreciation – 2024 for wok among mentally challenged children.

11. Kerala Leadership Award – Awarded by World Education Congress, India Chapter. (This award is for competent Medical Education) – 2023

12. IMA – National Award for outstanding entrepreneurship

13. World Malayalee Council Award - Community Health Care Award - 26th Feb 2026

An accomplished academic and global health advocate, has published seven scientific research papers in international journals and represented India at major international medical and social health conferences in Germany, China, the United Kingdom, Australia, the United States, Singapore, Sri Lanka, and Geneva (WHO & ILO).

Dr. Bennet Abraham’s contributions have expanded access to quality healthcare for the poor and strengthened the mission of medical service in India to the rural population in South India.
