= O. Rajagopal =

Indian politician

Dr. O. Rajagopal
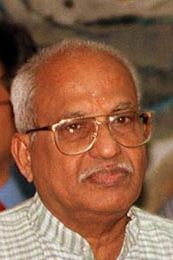

Member of the Kerala Legislative Assembly
- In office 19 May 2016 – 2 May 2021
- Preceded by: V. Sivankutty
- Succeeded by: V. Sivankutty
- Constituency: Nemom

Minister of State for Defence and Parliamentary Affairs, Urban Development, Law, Justice and Company Affairs, Railways
- In office 13 October 1999 – 22 May 2004
- Prime Minister: Atal Bihari Vajpayee

Member of Parliament, Rajya Sabha
- In office 1992 – 2004

Personal details
- Born: 15 September 1929 (age 97) Palakkad, Madras Presidency, British India (present day Palakkad, Kerala, India)
- Party: Bharatiya Janata Party
- Spouse: Dr. Shantha Kumari
- Children: 2 (incl. Vivekanand, Shyamaprasad)
- Parents: Kunnathu Madhavan Nair; O. Konhikkavu Amma

Olanchery Rajagopal (born 15 September 1929) is an Indian politician from Keralam.He is the former Union Minister of State for Defence and Railways. He is also the former MLA from Nemom and the first Bharatiya Janata Party member & the first ever Kerala Legislative Assembly Parliamentary Party Leader of the BJP in Kerala. One of the major leaders of the Bharatiya Janata Party from Kerala, he has held various ministerial portfolios including Defence, Parliamentary Affairs, Urban Development, Law, Justice, Company Affairs, and Railways. Rajagopal was a two-time MP in Rajya Sabha, the upper house of Indian Parliament from 1992 till 2004. O.Rajagopal was a member of Government of Kerala's Legislative Assembly Committee on Petitions & Committee of Public Work, Transport and Communications.

In addition, he was honored with the Padma Bhushan, the third-highest civilian honor in the country, on the eve of India's 75th Republic Day. The award recognizes his contributions in the public sphere. He also served as the Bharatiya Janata Party parliamentary party deputy leader in the Rajya Sabha. Rajagopal was also the former BJP national vice president & state president of BJP in Kerala. Rajagopal lost the 2014 Lok sabha elections in the Thiruvananthapuram constituency by a narrow margin of 13000 votes after a close fight. He has also lost few assembly elections by a low margin.

Union Government planned to make O. Rajagopal the next State Governor of Goa after his term ended as an MLA in the Kerala Legislative Assembly in May 2021. But he gave away the offer later by Central government that allows another Kerala BJP leader P. S. Sreedharan Pillai who is then Governor of Mizoram and transferred to Goa as the new Governor.

== Early life ==
He was born on Thiruvonam day, 15 September 1929 to Pandalam Kunnathu Madhavan Nair and O. Konhikkavu Amma of Olanchery Veedu in Pudukkode Panchayath in Palakkad. Rajagopal got his family name, Olanchery, through matrilineal succession. He is the eldest of the six children born to his parents. His early education took place in Kanakkannoor elementary school and Manjapra Upper Primary school and later went to Government Victoria College, Palakkad.

His Law education was undertaken in Government Law College, Chennai and after he completed his studies in law, he began practicing law in 1956 at the Palakkad District Court.

== Jana Sangh work ==
He was inspired by Deendayal Upadhyaya and began working in the Bharatiya Jana Sangh, shortly after completing his studies. The death of Upadhyaya in 1968 spurred Rajagopal to pursue his public career more deeply. He was the State General Secretary of Jana Sangh until 1974. That same year, he was promoted to the post of President, a post he held until 1977.

During the Emergency period he was jailed with V. Velankutty, who was the Palakkad District President of Jana Sangh in Viyyur Central Prison. After the Indian Emergency, the Jana Sangh merged with the Janata Party. During this period of time Rajagopal served as the State General Secretary for the Jana Sangh.

== BJP work ==
In 1980, the Janata Party split and the Bharatiya Janata Party (BJP) was formed. Rajagopal then served as its Kerala president until 1985. After 1985 he occupied a number of positions, including the All India Secretary, General Secretary, and the Vice-President of BJP. In 1989 he ran for a Lok Sabha from Manjeri but lost. Two years later, he contested in Thiruvananthapuram seat and lost again. His next run took place in the state of Madhya Pradesh. He was elected in 1992 and 1998 to the Rajya Sabha. In 1999 he attempted a second run from Thiruvananthapuram but failed again. However, he got a total of 1,58,221 votes (20.9%) and came second in one assembly segment out of seven. The total number of votes he secured was much higher than that for the previous BJP candidate in 1998 (94,303 votes, 12.3%) and 1996 (74,904, 10.4%) Lok Sabha elections.

In 2004 Lok Sabha election, he contested for the third time from Thiruvananthapuram and finished third yet again, behind INC candidate V. S Shivakumar and CPI candidate P. K. Vasudevan Nair. He secured a total of 2,28,052 votes (29.9%) which was the highest votes secured by a BJP candidate in Kerala.

In the 2011 Assembly elections he contested from the Nemom constituency in Thiruvananthapuram, but eventually lost by a margin of 6,400 votes. He lost the by-election from Neyyattinkara, which was held on 2 June 2012. However, he increased the BJP votes from 6,730 (2011 Assembly Election) to 30,507; an almost five-fold increase within a span of a year. The BJP vote share also significantly increased from 6.0% in the 2011 election to 23.2%. He contested from Thiruvananthapuram for the fourth time in 2014 and finished second position, behind INC candidate Shashi Tharoor who was former UPA Minister at the central government. Rajagopal secured a total of 2,82,336 votes (32.3%) and lost by a margin of 15,470 votes (1.8%) against Tharoor, who had secured 2,97,806 votes.

He contested Aruvikkara by-election and finished third, although his personal influence ensured that in the contest Bharatiya Janata Party increased votes from 7,694 to 34,145 causing division of anti-incumbency vote resulting in the victory of UDF. In the 2016 Assembly elections he contested from Nemom and defeated the sitting MLA V. Sivankutty, by a margin of 8,671 votes, thereby entering Kerala Legislative Assembly for the first time at the age of 87.

== Lok Sabha Elections ==
Year	Constituency	Party	Votes	%	Opponent	Party	Votes	%	Result	Margin	%
1980	Kasaragod	JP	190,086	41.05	M. Ramanna Rai	CPI(M)	263,673	56.95	Lost	▼73,587	▼15.90
1984	Manjeri	BJP	43,301	7.67	Ebrahim Sulaiman Sait	IUML	287,538	50.90	Lost	▼244,237	▼43.23
1991	Thiruvananthapuram	BJP	80,566	11.33	A. Charles	INC	334,272	46.99	Lost	▼253,706	▼35.66
1999	Thiruvananthapuram	BJP	158,221	20.93	Adv. V.S. Sivakumar	INC	288,390	38.15	Lost	▼130,169	▼17.22
2004	Thiruvananthapuram	BJP	228,052	29.86	P.K. Vasudevan Nair	CPI	286,057	37.45	Lost	▼58,005	▼7.59
2014	Thiruvananthapuram	BJP	282,336	32.32	Dr. Shashi Tharoor	INC	297,806	34.09	Lost	▼15,470	▼1.77

== Kerala Assembly Elections ==
=== Assembly election 2016 ===
Nemom Assembly constituency
Party	Candidate	Votes	%	±%
BJP	O. Rajagopal	67,813	47.46%	▲10.02
CPI(M)	V. Sivankutty	59,142	41.39%	▼1.55
JD(U)	V. Surendran Pillai	13,860	9.70%	▼7.66

=== Aruvikkara by-election 2015 ===
Aruvikkara by-election 2015:
Party	Candidate	Votes	%	±%
INC	K. S. Sabarinadhan	56,448	39.61	▼10.47
CPI(M)	M. Vijayakumar	46,320	32.50	▼7.11
BJP	O Rajagopal	34,145	23.90	▲17.29

=== Neyyattinkara By-Election 2012 ===
Neyyattinkara By Election 2012
Party	Candidate	Votes	%	±%
INC	R. Selvaraj	52,528	39.96	▼3.02
CPI(M)	F. Lawrence	46,194	35.14	▼13.84
BJP	O. Rajagopal	30,507	23.21	▲17.18

=== Assembly election 2011 ===
Nemom Assembly constituency
Party	Candidate	Votes	%	±%
CPI(M)	V. Sivankutty	50,076	42.99%	
BJP	O. Rajagopal	43,661	37.49%	
SJ(D)	Charupara Ravi	20,248	17.38%	

=== Assembly election 2006 ===
Palakkad Assembly constituency
Party	Candidate	Votes	%	±%
CPI(M)	K. K. Divakaran	41,166	36.97%	
INC	A. V. Gopinathan	39,822	35.76%	
BJP	O. Rajagopal	27,667	24.85%	

=== Assembly election 1970 ===
Palakkad Assembly constituency
Party	Candidate	Votes	%	±%
CPI(M)	R. Krishnan	23,113	40.50%	
Independent	A. Chandran Nair	17,653	30.93%	
ABJS	O. Rajagopal	15,646	27.42%	
