= P. S. Nataraja Pillai =

Indian politician

- P. S. Nataraja Pillai in 1962 when he was elected as a Member of Parliament.

Member of Parliament, Lok Sabha
- In office 1962–1966
- Constituency: Thiruvananthapuram

Personal details
- Born: March 1891 Alappuzha, Kerala
- Died: January 1966 (aged 74)
- Party: Indian National Congress, Indian Socialist, Praja Socialist Party
- Spouse: Komalam
- Children: 12

P. S. Nataraja Pillai (March 1891 – 1966) was an Indian politician, freedom fighter and Member of Parliament during the 3rd Lok Sabha elections held in 1962. He served as the Adviser to the Travancore government at Delhi in 1948 and finance minister of the Travancore-Cochin state from 1954 to 1955.

== Life and background ==
P. S. Nataraja Pillai was born in the Alappuzha district of Kerala in March 1891. He was originally elected as a Member of Parliament independently in 1962; later, he established his political associations with the Congress, Indian Socialist Party and the Praja Socialist Party.

Before the Independence of India, he was a member of the Travancore Constitution Reforms Committee in 1946. During his career, he was a member of the Travancore Manigam Karam Committee from 1952 to 1953, the Unemployment Committee in 1956, and the Reforms Committee (Kerala) from 1958 to 1959. Besides remaining a member in government-led committees, it was in 1960 when Pillai was appointed as the Chairman of the High Level Sales Tax Enquiry Committee for a period of one year.

In 1948, one year after independence, Pillai was elected as a member of the Constituent Assembly until 1950; later, he served in Travancore-Cochin's Legislative Assembly from 1951 to 1957. In 1962, Pillai contested the parliamentary elections from the Thiruvananthapuram constituency (also known as "Trivandrum") and was elected as a Member of Parliament.

== Personal life ==
Pillai was the son of an Indian scholar Manonmaniam P. Sundaram Pillai, known professionally as Professor Manonmaniam Sundaram Pillai, who was an educator in a college located in Kerala. He was married to Komalam and he had seven daughters and three sons. His son Sundaram Pillai (Jr.) was economics Professor at Sree Krishna College, Guruvayur.

== Controversies ==
In 2017, the Chief Minister of Kerala Pinarayi Vijayan claimed to have made objectionable remarks about P. S. Nataraja Pillai. The Minister later acknowledged the remarks citing that he never meant to demean a particular person but only some Pillai families. Vijayan clarified the controversies citing that he didn't even remember Nataraja's name. The opposition party Indian National Congress demanded the resignation of the Kerala CM over his remarks which landed him in a wide controversy.
