= Pallithura =

- village
- Location in Kerala, India Pallithura (India)
- Coordinates: 8.552419°N 76.855803°E
- Country: India
- State: Kerala
- District: Thiruvananthapuram

Government
  - Type: Government
  - Body: Trivandrum Corporation

Languages
  - Official: Malayalam, English
- Time zone: UTC+5:30 (IST)
- Postal code: 695586
- Vehicle registration: KL-22
- Website: http://www.pallithura.com, https://www.pallithuraparish.com

Pallithura is the north-west portion of Trivandrum city the capital of Kerala state in India. Literally translated from Malayalam, it means 'the beach (Thura) besides the church (Palli). Although most churches in this region where beside the Arabian Sea, the etymology is significant because Pallitura is one of the places where St. Francis Xavier established a church. This church has now been transformed to the space museum of Vikram Sarabhai Space Centre. The villagers of Pallithura are now famous for their sacrifice in 1962 of most of their village for creating the Thumba Equatorial Rocket Launching Station (TERLS), which was the basis for the formation of Indian Space Research Organization. The revival of interest in the history of Pallithura resulted as a result of President Abdul Kalam's mentioning of it in his books and speeches.

== Location ==
The location of Pallithura can be specified based on the time in question: before and after the formation of TERLS. Till the formation of TERLS, Pallithura bordered Veli in the south, Kulathoor in the east, and Kochuthura in the north. The Parvathy Puthannaar canal formed the border with Kulathoor. Due to this vast expanse making the then Pallithura one of the biggest parishes in the diocese. After the formation of TERLS, Parvathy Puthanar Canal become the east and VSSC Housing Colony on South same way Arabian Sea on west and KINFRA Industrial Area on North.

  - Pallithura Is In Attipra Village*

== Pallithura of 1960s ==
Based on the rehabilitation agreement with the government of India, a model village was to be rebuilt to its southern border. The villagers are of Latin Catholic faith and hence a large church which was a priority was built. A primary school was built to facilitate basic education. The houses were neatly built single bedroom on ten-cents of land consisting of a kitchen, patio, and a living room. They were aligned in thirteen parallel lanes, with sixteen houses (eight on each side) on a lane. A state-of-the-art water supply and distribution system was the attraction providing water for the entire village through two public taps in each lane. A police check-post was formed to maintain order in case people were not very comfortable with the packed nature of their new neighbourhood. A public transport main road with a designated bus stop provided access to the city. In order to aid the villagers who were dependent on the sea for their livelihood, an ice-plant and fish processing centre was built. For entertainment, a radio-kiosk was built and land was set-aside for resting at evenings. A market-place and a medical clinic was built at the centre of the village.
