= A. Charles =

Indian politician

A. Charles was a former MP of India Thiruvananthapuram. He was a leader of Indian National Congress. He represented Thiruvananthapuram Constituency in Lok Sabha 3 times in a row. He was elected to Lok Sabha from Thiruvananthapuram constituency for successive terms in 1984, 1989, and 1991. Charles, who was a government servant, was closely associated with educational and welfare organisations of the South Kerala Diocese of the Church of South India (CSI). He had also served as a member of the state Public Service Commission, which he resigned to contest the election in 1984, after being persuaded by his mentor Sri K Karunakaran.
