= Easwara Iyer =

Indian politician

Member of parliament, Lok Sabha for Trivandrum
- In office 1957–1962
- Prime Minister: Jawaharlal Nehru
- Preceded by: None

Personal details
- Party: Independent
- Profession: Politician

Easwara Iyer was an Indian politician who served as the Member of parliament, Lok Sabha for Trivandrum from 1957 to 1962. He was the first MP from Trivandrum since the formation of Kerala and was elected as an independent beating his closest rival A. Thanu Pillai of the Praja Socialist Party by a margin of 10,944 votes.
