= R. S. Unni =

Indian politician

R.S. Unni (18 February 1925 – 17 February 1999) was an Indian politician and trade unionist. He served as a Central Committee member of the Revolutionary Socialist Party (RSP) and president of the United Trade Union Congress (UTUC). A state legislator for decades, he served as a Kerala state government minister in the 1980s.

== Student and labour activism ==
R.S. Unni was the son of Raman Unni. In his youth he was active in student politics, through the Travancore Congress. He served as the general secretary of the Kerala Students Congress. He was jailed for his role in anti-government protests in Travancore. He joined the Kerala Socialist Party in 1948, and became a member of the State Executive Committee of the party. He joined the RSP in 1950. A prominent trade unionist, he was noted for leading 'about 21 trade unions' as of the early 1970s.

== Legislator ==
He contested the 1960 Kerala Legislative Assembly election, standing as a candidate in the Thrrikkadavur constituency. He obtained 17,309 votes (16.7%). In 1965 he contested the Eravipuram assembly seat, finishing in second place with 18,458 votes (35.55%). He lost the seat by a margin of 656 votes. He won the Eravipuram seat in the 1967 assembly election, obtaining 31,083 votes (63.41%).

== Deputy Speaker ==
R.S. Unni retained the Eravipuram seat in the 1970 election, obtaining 35,631 votes (62.53%). He was the Deputy Speaker of the legislative assembly between 31 October 1970 and 22 March 1977. Between 9 May 1975 and 16 February 1976 he acted as the Speaker of the assembly. In the assembly he chaired the Public Undertakings Committee 1970–71, 1973–74 and 1976–77 and the Subordinate Legislation Committee 1971–72, 1972–73 and 1974–75. He again won the Eravipuram seat in the 1977 election, obtaining 39,119 votes (58.52%). He served as Kerala State Committee secretary of RSP 1978–1980.

== Minister ==
R.S. Unni retained Eravipuram in the 1980 election, getting 45,281 votes (57.65%). Between 25 January and 20 October 1981 he held the post as Minister for Local Administration in the E.K. Nayanar cabinet.

In the 1982 election, he won the Eravipuram seat with 37,862 votes (48.65%). He was the opposition candidate for the post as speaker of the Kerala Legislative Assembly in June 1982, but was defeated by 74 against 61 votes.

== Lok Sabha candidate ==
R.S. Unni contested the Quilon Lok Sabha seat in the 1984 Indian general election. He finished in second place with 259,371 votes (46.14%). He again contested the Quilon seat in the 1991 Indian general election, finishing in second place with 342,796 votes (46.63%).
