= Pannian Ravindran =

Indian politician

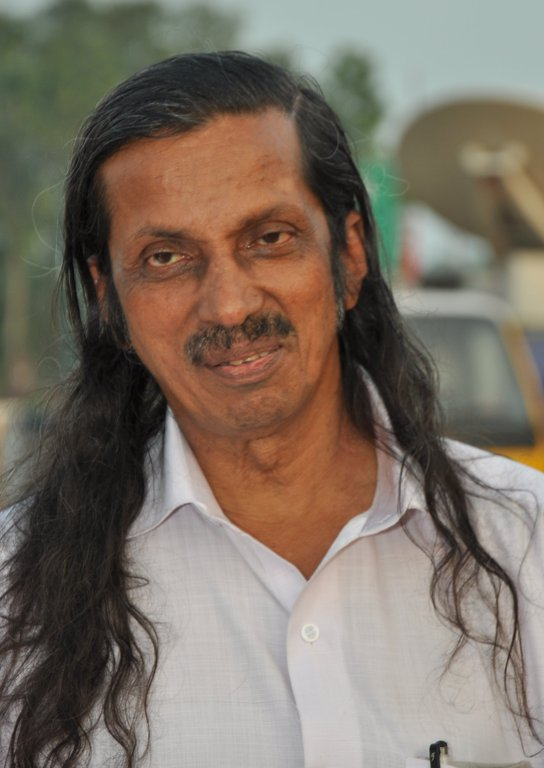
- Ravindran in 2012

Secretary of the Communist Party of India Kerala State Council
- In office 10 April 2012 – 2 March 2015
- Preceded by: C. K. Chandrappan
- Succeeded by: Kanam Rajendran

Member of Parliament, Lok Sabha
- In office 1 January 2005 – 1 January 2009
- Preceded by: P. K. Vasudevan Nair
- Succeeded by: Shashi Tharoor
- Constituency: Thiruvananthapuram

CPI Central Secretariat Member
- In office 2016–2019

CPI Central Control Commission Chairman
- In office 2019–2022

Personal details
- Born: 22 December 1945 (age 80) Kakkat, Kannur, Kerala, India
- Party: Communist Party of India
- Spouse: Ratnavally
- Children: 3
- Parent(s): Smt. Yasodha (mother); Shri C.P. Raman (father)
- As of 23 September, 2006

Pannian Ravindran (born 22 December 1945) is an Indian politician from Kerala and former state secretary of Kerala State Committee of CPI (Communist Party of India) from 2012 to 2015. He was a member of the 14th Lok Sabha of India and represented the Thiruvananthapuram constituency.

== Early Life & Education ==
Ravindran lived in a thatched house with mud walls as a child, his family was politically involved with the CPI. His father died when he was 12 and due to poverty, he stopped going to school and started working at a beedi factory in Kakkad in order to support his family. His weekly wage was 50 paise. Therefore his education is a 5th pass.

Preceded by P. K. Vasudevan Nair	Member of Parliament from Thiruvananthapuram; 2005–2009	Succeeded by Shashi Tharoor
