= V. Muraleedharan =

Indian politician (born 1958)

V. Muraleedharan MLA
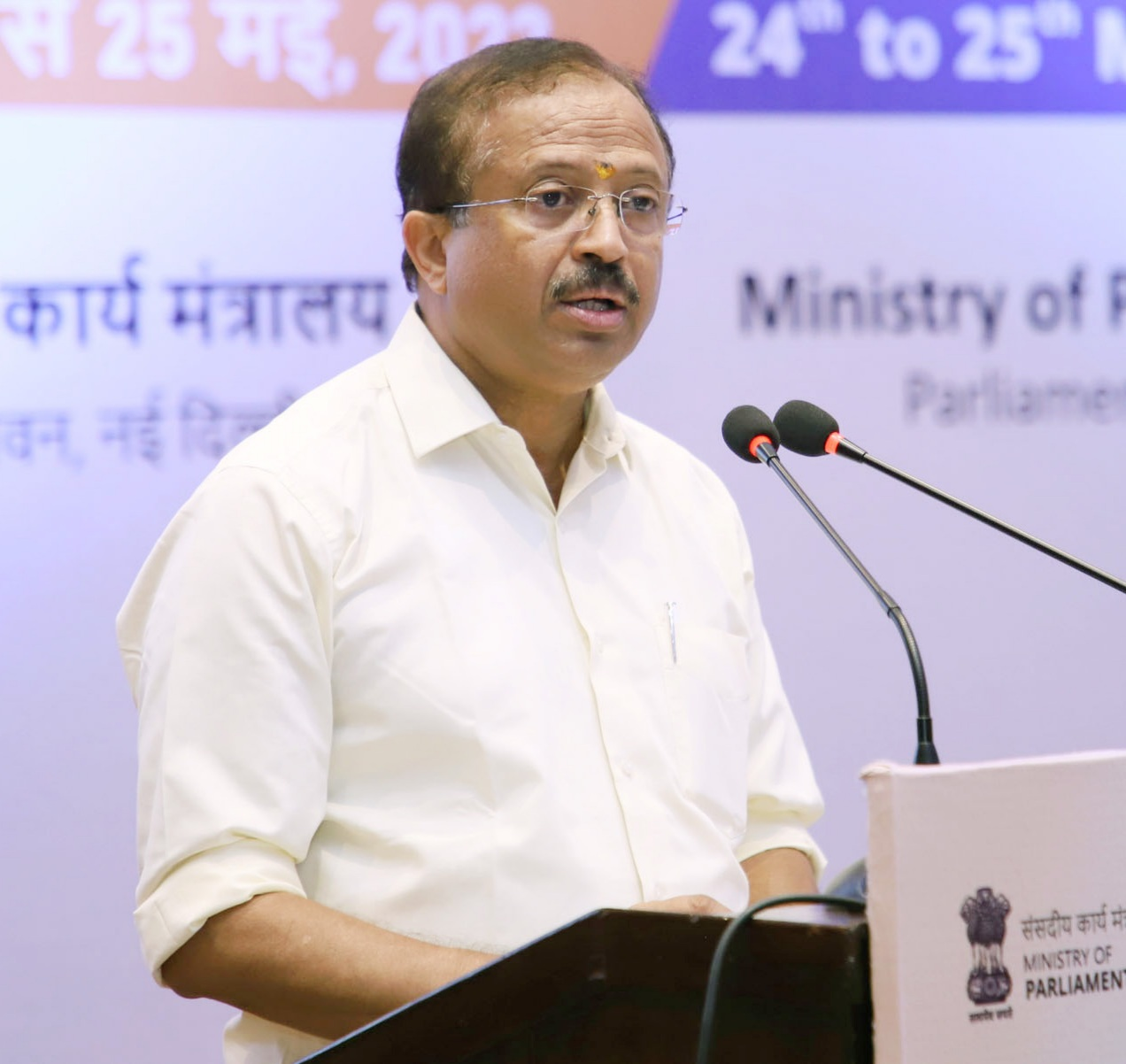

Member of the Kerala Legislative Assembly
- Incumbent
- Assumed office 4 May 2026
- Preceded by: Kadakampally Surendran
- Constituency: Kazhakootam

Minister of State for External Affairs
- In office 31 May 2019 – 11 June 2024
- Prime Minister: Narendra Modi
- Minister: S. Jaishankar
- Preceded by: V. K. Singh
- Succeeded by: Kirti Vardhan Singh

Minister of State for Parliamentary Affairs
- In office 30 May 2019 – 11 June 2024
- Prime Minister: Narendra Modi
- Minister: Prahlad Joshi
- Preceded by: Vijay Goel

Member of Parliament, Rajya Sabha
- In office 3 April 2018 – 2 April 2024

President of Bharatiya Janata Party, Kerala
- In office 2010 – 2015
- Preceded by: P. K. Krishna Das
- Succeeded by: Kummanam Rajasekharan

Personal details
- Born: 12 December 1958 (age 67) Eranholi, Kannur, Kerala, India
- Party: Bharatiya Janata Party
- Spouse: Dr. K. S. Jayasree (m. 1998)
- Parents: Vannathanveetil Gopalan; Nampally Vellamvelly Devaki Amma
- Education: Government Brennen College, Thalassery
- Website: vmuraleedharan.com

Vellamvelly Muraleedharan (born 12 December 1958) is an Indian politician from Kerala, belonging to Bharatiya Janata Party. In 2026, he was elected to Kerala Legislative Assembly from Kazhakootam. He was a Member of Parliament in the Rajya Sabha, from 2018 to 2024. He was sworn in as a Union Minister on 30 May 2019. He served as Minister of State for External Affairs and Parliamentary Affairs of India from 2019 to 2024. On 12 June 2019, Muraleedharan was appointed Government Deputy Chief Whip in the Rajya Sabha. He was the eighth State President of Bharatiya Janata Party (BJP) in Kerala.

== Early life and politics ==
Muraleedharan was born to Vannathanveetil Gopalan and Nampally Vellamvelly Devaki Amma on 12 December 1958 at Eranholi, Thalassery in Kannur District. Muraleedharan got his family name, Vellamvelly, through matrilineal succession.

Muraleedharan was educated at Kodakkalam UP School, and thereafter at St Joseph's Higher Secondary School, Thalassery. He is a graduate in English literature from Government Brennen College, Thalassery. He was closely associated with Akhil Bharatiya Vidyarthi Parishad (ABVP) right from his school days.

Muraleedharan began his political activities during the days of National Emergency that gripped India from June 1975 to March 1977. In 1978 as the Taluk President, he led ABVP in Thalassery. He became the Kannur District Secretary in 1979 and the State Joint Secretary of ABVP in 1980.

Muraleedharan shifted his activities to the RSS at Kozhikode and became a full-time worker of ABVP. He quit his job later and was elected as the State Organizing Secretary of ABVP in 1983 at the age of 25. From 1987 to 1990, he also held the additional responsibility as All India Secretary of ABVP. During his 11 years tenure (1983–1994) as the State Organising Secretary, he worked closely with K.N. Govindacharya and Dattatraya Hosabale, who were then the successive South Zone Organising Secretaries of the ABVP. The ABVP team during 1983–1994 at the state and national level had leaders including Ananth Kumar (Karnataka), Sushil Modi (Bihar), Jagat Prakash Nadda (Himachal Pradesh), Muraleedhara Rao (Rajasthan), Harendra Kumar (Former All India General Secretary), Om Prakash Kohli (All India President), Professor Late Bal Apte, (All India President), Vinod Tawde and Chandrakant Patil (All India General Secretaries).

Muraleedharan left for Mumbai when he was appointed All India General Secretary of ABVP for the term 1994–1996.

Muraleedharan returned to Kerala in 1997 on a research project of Khadi and Village Industries Commission at Trivandrum.

== Personal life ==
In 1998, Muraleedharan married Dr. K. S. Jayasree who is currently a Sanskrit lecturer at Sree Narayana College, Nattika. They live at Eranhipalam, Kozhikode and at Ulloor, Thiruvananthapuram. The couple have no children.

== Political life ==
Muraleedharan's formal entry into the fore of the BJP took place during the 1998 Lok Sabha elections. He was deputed to assist Venkaiah Naidu at the BJP Central Election Control Room at New Delhi.

In 1999, Muraleedharan was appointed Vice Chairman of Nehru Yuva Kendra under Department of Youth Affairs and Sports, Government of India.

In 2004, Muraleedharan was appointed the National convener of NGO cell of BJP. Thereafter in 2005, he was made the All India convener of BJP training cell.

During his tenure as the BJP Kerala Vice president (2006–2010), his major assignments were to provide ideological orientation to the party workers in Kerala as part of training cell activities and impart and oversee training to the local body members of the BJP. He contested Loksabha election from Kozhikode Parliamentary Constituency in 2009.

In January 2010 he was elected as the State President of the Kerala BJP. He was elected for his second term in the office in January 2013.

The Kerala BJP had a vote share of 10.8 percent in the 2014 Lok Sabha Election whereas it recorded 6.4 percent in 2009. The total votes BJP got in the local body elections was nearly 28 Lakhs. The 2014–2015 membership drive has expanded the party membership base from 5.75 lakhs to 20 lakhs.

In April 2018, he was elected to Rajya Sabha the upper house of Parliament. He is the 5th ever BJP MP from Kerala. Currently, he is the state in-charge of Andhra Pradesh BJP.

In the 2024 Indian general election, he contested for BJP from Attingal Lok Sabha constituency, but ended up in third place.

Election candidature history
Election	Year	Party	Constituency	Opponent		Result	Margin
Loksabha	2009	BJP	Kozhikode	INC	M. K. Raghavan	Lost	252,591
Loksabha	2024	BJP	Attingal	INC	Adoor Prakash	Lost	16,272
Kerala Legislative Assembly	2016	BJP	Kazhakootam	CPI(M)	Kadakampally Surendran	Lost	7,347
Kerala Legislative Assembly	2026	BJP	Kazhakootam	CPI(M)	Kadakampally Surendran	Won	428

== Positions held ==
- 1981–1983: Regional Organizing Secretary, ABVP, Kozhikode.
- 1983–1994: State Organizing Secretary, ABVP.
- 1987–1990: All India Secretary, ABVP.
- 1994–1996: All India General Secretary, ABVP.
- 1999–2002: Vice Chairman of Nehru Yuva Kendra.
- 2002–2004: Director General, Nehru Yuva Kendra.
- Convener, Youth Employment Generation Task Force (Khadi and Village Industry Commission).
- Founder president and currently a director board member of National Yuva Cooperative Society.
- 2004: National convener of NGO cell of BJP.
- 2005: Convener, All India BJP Training Cell.
- 2006–2010: Vice President, Kerala BJP.
- 2010–2015: President, Kerala BJP state fraction.
- 2018 April: Elected as the Member of Parliament (Rajya Sabha).
- 2018 August: In charge of Andhra Pradesh, BJP
- Member of the standing committee of the parliament on External Affairs
- Member of Consultative Committee of the Ministry of Railways
- Member of the Court of Indian Maritime University, Chennai
- In May 2019, Muraleedharan became Minister of State for External Affairs and Parliamentary Affairs.
- On 12 June 2019, he was appointed the Govt. Deputy Chief Whip of Rajyasabha.
- In 2019, he has been elected as the President of Dakshina Bharat Hindi Prachar Sabha, in Chennai.
- In 2026, he was elected as an MLA to the Kerala Legislative Assembly from Kazhakkoottam constituency in Thiruvananthapuram.
