= Communist Marxist Party =

Political party in Kerala, India

- Abbreviation: CMP
- General Secretary: C. P. John
- Founder: M. V. Raghavan
- Founded: 1986 (40 years ago)
- Split from: Communist Party of India (Marxist)
- Headquarters: MVR Bhavan, Chitra nager, Pattom, Thiruvananthapuram, Kerala, India-695037
- Ideology: Communism; Marxism
- ECI status: Registered - Unrecognised
- Alliance: UDF; CICDS
- Seats in Kerala Legislative Assembly: 1 / 140

Election symbol
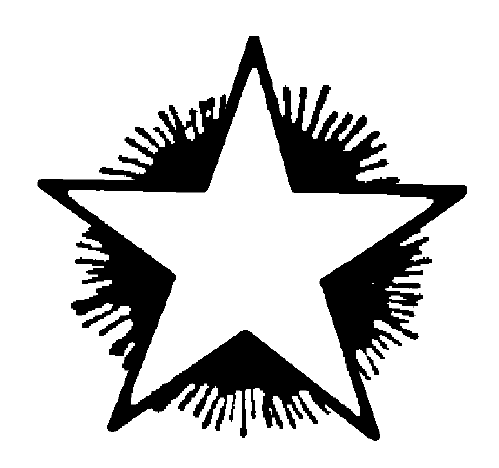

Party flag

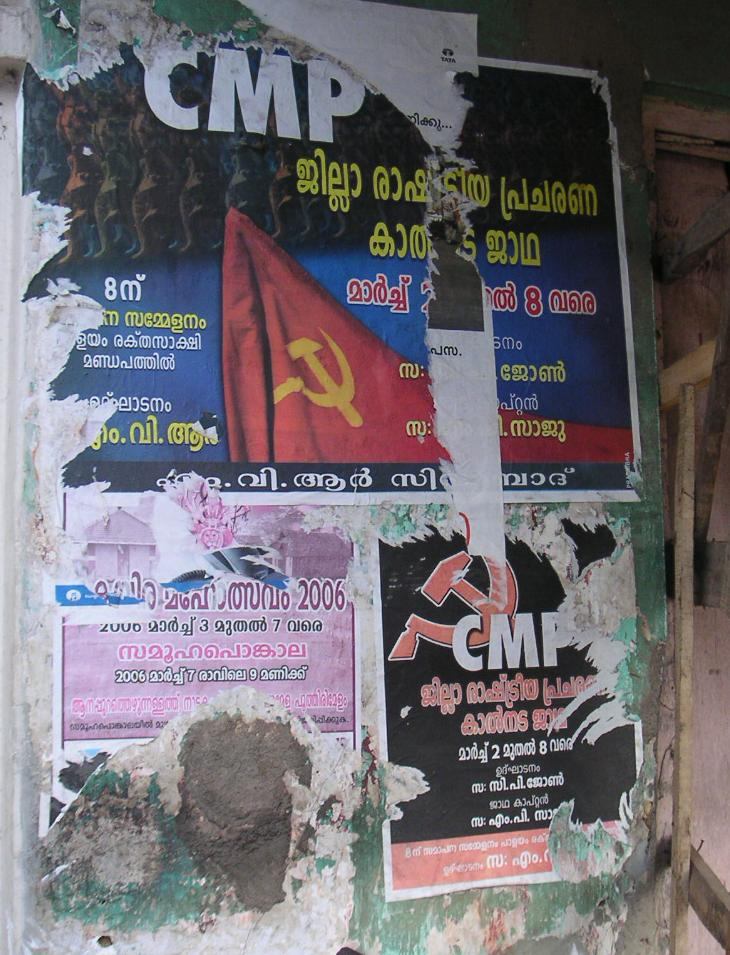
CMP posters in Nedumangad

Communist Marxist Party (CMP) is a political party in Kerala, India. The party was founded in 1986 when M. V. Raghavan was expelled from the CPI(M) due to a grave difference of opinion regarding the formation of alliances with the IUML. His support for forming a united front with parties such as the Indian Union Muslim League in order to take on alliances led by the INC was ultimately rejected by the CPI(M) leadership. He was subsequently expelled from the Party.

In 2011 assembly election of Kerala, CMP fielded 3 candidates but could not win any seat. CMP had links with the Party of Democratic Socialism of Saifuddin Chaudhury in West Bengal. M.V. Raghavan attended the PDS state conference in December 2003. CMP participated in the Confederation of Indian Communists and Democratic Socialists.

== Split ==
In March 2014, the party split into two factions:

- CMP(A) led by K. R. Aravindakshan
- CMP Kerala State Committee led by C. P. John

In 2019, some CMP(A) merged with CPI(M). CMP(KSC) support the UDF.

== Mass organizations ==
- All India Centre for Trade Unions (AICTU)
- Kerala Socialist Youth Federation (KSYF)
- State Employees and Teachers Federation (SETF)
- Democratic Students Federation ( DSF )

== Election results ==
=== Assembly elections in Kerala, 2026 ===
C.P John won the elections for the Thiruvananthapuram Assembly constituency and is the sole elected representative at state level for the party. He is now serving as the Minister of Transport in the Government of Kerala

=== Local elections in Kerala, 2015 ===
Total for Kerala: Village Wards:16, Block Wards:4, District Wards:1, Municipality Wards:7 & Corporation Wards:3.

- Thiruvananthapuram District - Corporation Wards:3, Village Wards:0.
- Kannur District - No Representation
- Kollam District - Village Wards:5
- Alappuzha District - Block Wards:1, Municipality Wards:2.
- Idukki District - Village Wards:1
- Ernakulam District - Village Wards:2
- Thrissur District - Village Wards:2, District Wards:1 & Municipality Wards:5.
- Palakkad District - Village Wards:2
- Malappuram District - Village Wards:2, Block Wards:1.
- Wayanad District - Block Wards:1.
- Kasaragod District - Village Wards:1, Block Wards:1.
