= M. V. Raghavan =

Indian politician

Minister for Co-Operation and Ports, Government of Kerala
- In office 17 May 2001 - 20 April 2006

Minister of Co-operation, Government of Kerala and
- In office 22 March 1995 - 09 May 1996
- Preceded by: Himself
- Succeeded by: Pinarayi Vijayan
- In office 24 June 1991 - 16 March 1995
- Preceded by: T. K. Ramakrishnan
- Succeeded by: Himself

Personal details
- Born: 5 May 1933 Cannanore, Malabar District, Madras Presidency, British India (present day Kannur, Kerala, India)
- Died: 9 November 2014 (aged 81)
- Party: Communist Party of India (1949–1964); Communist Party of India (Marxist) (1964–1986); Communist Marxist Party
- Spouse: Janaki
- Children: 4 (incl. M. V. Nikesh Kumar)

Melathu Veettil Raghavan (5 May 1933 – 9 November 2014) was a veteran Communist leader and a former Minister in Kerala state of India. He was the General Secretary of the CMP, an alliance partner in the UDF. Prior to the formation of the CMP he was a prominent leader of the CPI(M).

He was expelled from the CPI(M) following an inner party struggle in which he advocated alliance with the Kerala Congress and the IUML against the official line of keeping these 2 parties out of LDF. He then formed the CMP and later joined the UDF. He was a minister in UDF governments a number of times.

He belongs to Kannur district of Kerala. His district is one of the developing zones in the country. Raghavan set up the first co-operative sector medical college in the country, Government Medical College in Kannur District. He was the key person to build the first Visha Chikitsa Kendram (Snake Venom Removal Centre) in Pappinisseri, Kannur district. His other major achievement has been the setting up of a Snake Park in Dharmasala, which has become a major tourist attraction.

== Positions held ==
- Member, 4th Kerala Legislative Assembly from Madayi – CPI(M)
- Member, 5th Kerala Legislative Assembly from Thaliparamba – CPI(M)
- Member, 6th Kerala Legislative Assembly from Kuthuparamba – CPI(M)
- Member, 7th Kerala Legislative Assembly from Payyannur – CPI(M)
- Member, 8th Kerala Legislative Assembly from Azhikode – CMP
- Member, 9th Kerala Legislative Assembly from Kazhakkootam – CMP
- Member, 11th Kerala Legislative Assembly from Trivandrum-West-CMP
- Minister for Co-Operation, Government of Kerala, 24 June 1991 to 9 May 1996
- Minister for Co-Operation and Ports, Government of Kerala, 17 May 2001 to 20 April 2006
- President, Pappinissery Panchayat, Kannur (16 years)

== Personal life ==
Raghavan was born to Shankaran Nambiar on 5 May 1933 in Kannur. He was married to Janaki. The couple have three sons, notable being M. V. Nikesh Kumar, a journalist and a daughter.

Since 2005, Raghavan was bed-ridden with advanced Parkinson's disease. He died on 9 November 2014 at the age of 81. He was cremated with full state honours at Payyambalam Beach Crematorium, near the memorials of Swadeshabhimani Ramakrishna Pillai, A. K. Gopalan, K. G. Marar and E. K. Nayanar. Janaki, his wife, died in 2021.
