= Kollam Assembly constituency =

Constituency of the Kerala legislative assembly in India

Kollam
- Constituency No. 124 for the Kerala Legislative Assembly
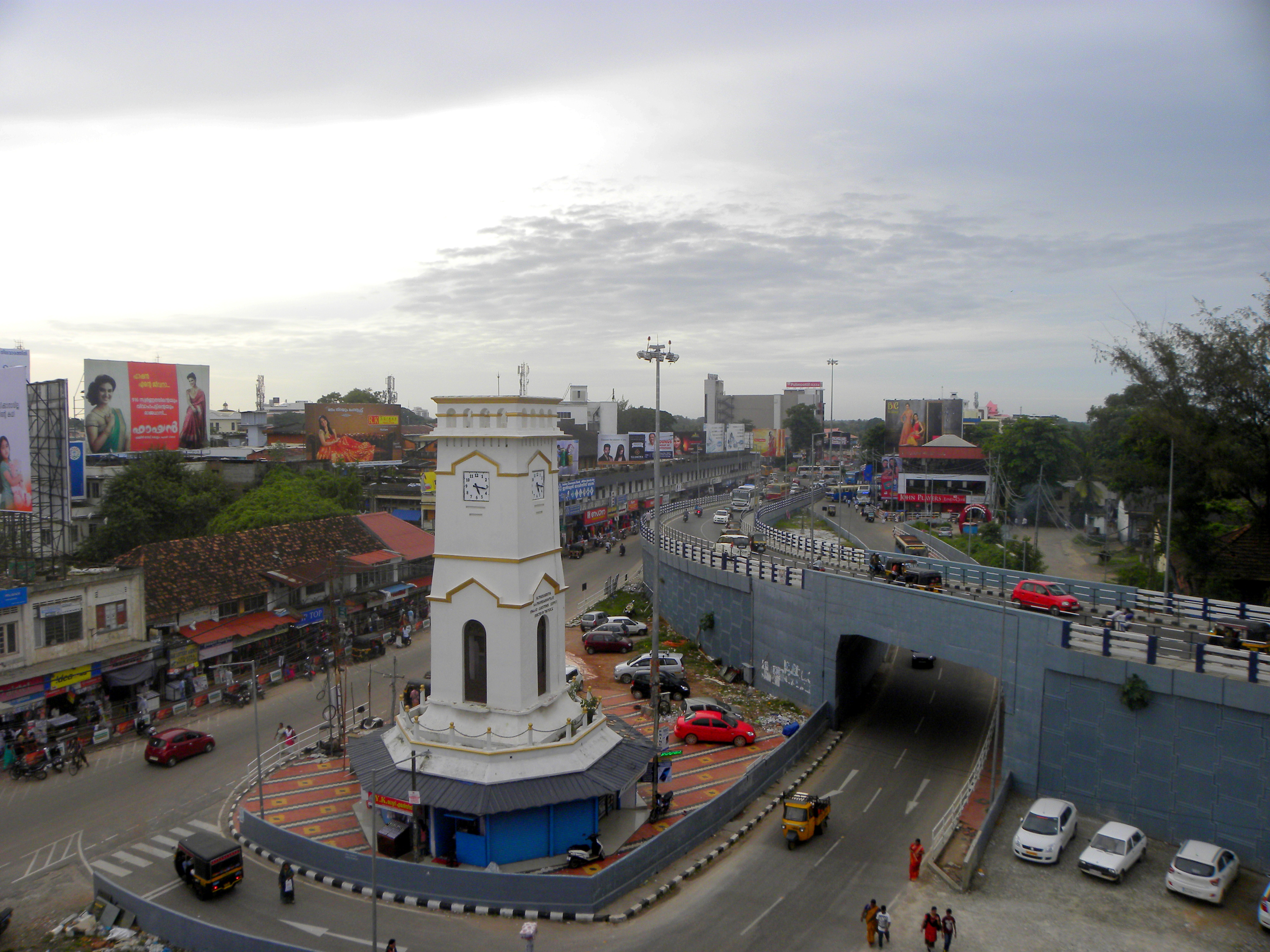
- Chinnakkada in Kollam city

Constituency details
- Country: India
- Region: South India
- State: Kerala
- District: Kollam
- Established: 1951
- Reservation: None

Member of Legislative Assembly
- 16th Kerala Legislative Assembly
- Incumbent Bindhu Krishna
- Party: INC
- Alliance: UDF
- Elected year: 2026

Kollam Assembly constituency is a legislative assembly constituency in the South Indian state of Kerala. It is one among the 11 assembly constituencies in Kollam district. As of the 2026 assembly elections, the incumbent Member of the Legislative Assembly is Bindhu Krishna of the Indian National Congress.

== Structure ==
Kollam Assembly constituency includes 19 wards of Kollam City Corporation (Kureepuzha West, Kureepuzha, Neeravil, Anchalumoodu, Kadavoor, Mathilil, Thevally, Vadakkumbhagam, Uliyakovil East, Kadappakada, Koickal, Kallumthazham, Mundakkal, Pattathanam, Cantonment, Udayamarthandapuram, Thamarakkulam, Pallithottam and Port Kollam) along with the neighbouring panchayaths of Panayam and Thrikkaruva, as per the recent changes on Assembly constituency delimitations.

== Major institutions ==
- Corporations: 1 (Kollam)
- Panchayaths: 2 (Panayam; Thrikkaruva)
- Railway stations: 1 (Kollam Junction)
- Bus stations: 3 (Kollam KSRTC Bus Station; Andamukkam City Bus Stand; Tangasseri Bus Terminal)
- Government hospitals: 2 (Govt. District Hospital, Kollam; Community Health Center in Thrikkadavoor)
- RTOs: 1 (Kollam city)

== Electoral history ==
=== Travancore-Cochin Legislative Assembly ===
Year	Name	Party	Vote Margin	Coalition
1951	T. K. Divakaran	RSP	2,349	Left
1954	T. K. Divakaran	RSP	6,175	Left

== Members of the Legislative Assembly ==
The following list contains all members of Kerala Legislative Assembly who have represented the constituency:

Election	Niyama Sabha	Name	Party	Margin	Tenure
1957	1st	A. A. Rahim	Indian National Congress	7,796	1957 – 1960
1960	2nd	A. A. Rahim	Indian National Congress	6,292	1960 – 1965
1965	3rd	Henry Austin	Indian National Congress	250	1965 – 1967
1967	3rd	T. K. Divakaran	Independent	9,751	1967 – 1970
1970	4th	T. K. Divakaran	Revolutionary Socialist Party	11,101	1970 – 1977
1977	5th	Thyagarajan	Revolutionary Socialist Party	13,016	1977 – 1980
1980	6th	Kadavoor Sivadasan	Revolutionary Socialist Party	2,414	1980 – 1982
1982	7th	Kadavoor Sivadasan	Revolutionary Socialist Party	7,077	1982 – 1984
1987	8th	Babu Divakaran	Revolutionary Socialist Party	12,722	1987 – 1991
1991	9th	Kadavoor Sivadasan	Indian National Congress	4,476	1991 – 1996
1996	10th	Babu Divakaran	Revolutionary Socialist Party	6,298	1996 – 2001
2001	11th	Babu Divakaran	Revolutionary Socialist Party	12,275	2001 – 2006
2006	12th	P. K. Gurudasan	Communist Party of India	11,439	2006 – 2011
2011	13th	P. K. Gurudasan	Communist Party of India	8,540	2011 – 2016
2016	14th	Mukesh	Communist Party of India	17,611	2016 - 2021
2021	15th	Mukesh	Communist Party of India	2,072	2021 - 2026
2026	16th	Bindhu Krishna	Indian National Congress	16,830	2026 -

== Election results ==
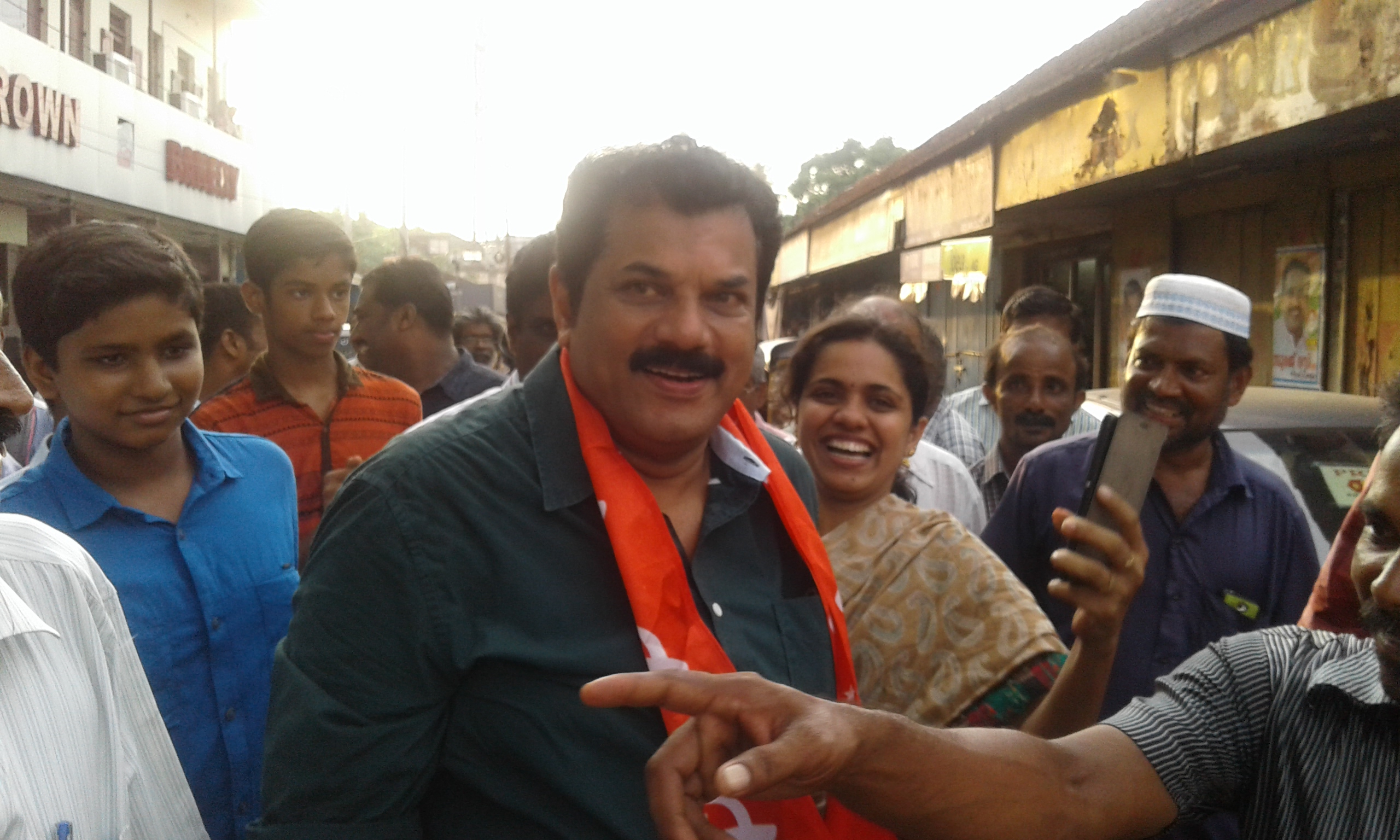
Famous Malayalam cinema actor Mukesh was a elected member from Kollam Assembly constituency

Assembly constituencies in Kollam district

Percentage change (±%) denotes the change in the number of votes from the immediate previous election.

=== 2026 ===
2026 Kerala Legislative Assembly election: Kollam
Party	Candidate	Votes	%	±%
UDF	Bindhu Krishna	63,416	48.90	▲5.63
LDF	S. Jayamohan	46,586	35.92	▼8.94
NDA	Dr. Prathap Kumar N.	18,537	14.29	▲3.36
NOTA	None of the above	715	0.55	
Margin of victory		16,830	14.98	
Turnout		1,16,145	77.43	
INC gain from CPI(M)		Swing	▲5.95	

=== 2021 ===
There were 1,76,041 registered voters in the constituency for the 2021 Kerala Assembly election.

2021 Kerala Legislative Assembly election: Kollam
Party	Candidate	Votes	%	±%
CPI(M)	M. Mukesh	58,524	44.86	▼5.95
INC	Bindu Krishna	56,452	43.27	▲8.08
BJP	M. Sunil	14,252	10.93	−
NOTA	None of the above	750	0.58	
BSP	Ramanan	290	0.22	▼0.11
Margin of victory		2,072	1.59	▼12.03
Turnout		1,30,451	74.10	▼0.82
CPI(M) hold		Swing	▼5.95	

=== 2016 ===
There were 1,72,552 registered voters in the constituency for the 2016 Kerala Assembly election.

2016 Kerala Legislative Assembly election: Kollam
Party	Candidate	Votes	%	±%
CPI(M)	M. Mukesh	63,103	52.81	▲2.05
INC	Sooraj Ravi	45,492	35.19	▼8.18
NDA	K. Sasikumar	17,409	13.47	
SDPI	Johnson Kandachira	1,576	1.22	▲0.20
NOTA	None of the above	889	0.69	
BSP	K. Balakrishnan	431	0.33	▼0.11
Independent	Narayanan Nair	209	0.16	▼0.01
Independent	S. Chandran	174	0.13	
Margin of victory		17,611	13.62	▲6.13
Turnout		1,29,283	74.92	▲3.87
CPI(M) hold		Swing	▼2.05	

=== 2011 ===
There were 1,60,475 registered voters in the constituency for the 2011 election.

2011 Kerala Legislative Assembly election: Kollam
Party	Candidate	Votes	%	±%
CPI(M)	P. K. Gurudasan	57,986	50.86	
INC	K. C. Rajan	49,446	43.37	
BJP	G. Hari	4,207	3.69	
SDPI	A. A. Shafi	1,168	1.02	
BSP	Mangad Thulaseedharan	507	0.44	
Independent	Sanu K.	372	0.33	
Independent	C. N. Narayanan Nair	191	0.17	
Independent	V. Mohanan	141	0.12	
Margin of victory		8,540	7.49	
Turnout		1,14,018	71.05	
CPI(M) hold		Swing		

== Kerala Ministers from this constituency ==
Tenure	Politician	Party	Coalition	Position	Ministry
1955–56	A. A. Rahim	INC	Right	Minister for Health, Agriculture and Industries	Panampilly Ministry
1967–69	T. K. Divakaran	RSP	Left	Minister for Public Works	Second E. M. S. Namboodiripad ministry
1970–76	T. K. Divakaran	RSP	Right	Minister for Public Works	Second C. Achutha Menon ministry
1981–82	Kadavoor Sivadasan	RSP	UDF	Minister for Labour	Second K. Karunakaran ministry
1982–87	Kadavoor Sivadasan	RSP(S)	UDF	Minister for Labour & Excise	Third K. Karunakaran ministry
2001–06	Babu Divakaran	RSP(B)	UDF	Minister for Labour	Third A. K. Antony ministry
2006–11	P. K. Gurudasan	CPI(M)	LDF	Minister for Labour	V. S. Achuthanandan ministry
2026–31	Bindhu Krishna	INC	UDF	Minister for Labour, Animal Husbandry, Dairy Development, Milk Co-operatives, Women & Child Development and Kerala Veterinary & Animal Sciences University	Satheesan ministry
