= 1951–52 Indian general election in Travancore-Cochin =

- 1952

12 (of 489) seats in the Lok Sabha
- Registered: 4,210,244
- Turnout: 2,989,273 (71.00%)
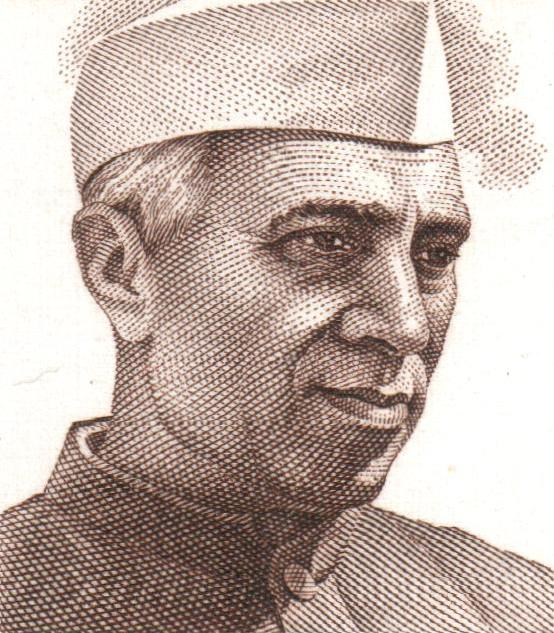
	First party	Second party	Third party
Leader	Jawaharlal Nehru	N. Sreekantan Nair	A. Nesamony
Party	INC	RSP	TTNC
Seats won	6	1	1
Popular vote	1,224,533	220,312	115,893
Percentage	35.08%	6.31%	3.32%
Prime Minister before election
Jawaharlal Nehru
INC
Prime Minister after election
Jawaharlal Nehru
INC

The 1951–52 Indian general election was the first democratic national election held in India after Independence, and the polls in Travancore-Cochin were held for 11 constituencies with 12 seats. The result was a victory for Indian National Congress winning 6 out of the 12 seats. And Revolutionary Socialist Party and Travancore Tamil Nadu Congress each winning 1 seat and the rest 4 being won by Independents.

== Results ==
=== By Parties ===
Party	Votes	%	Seats
Indian National Congress	1,224,533	35.08	6
Independents	1,265,051	36.24	4
Socialist Party	459,669	13.17	0
Revolutionary Socialist Party	220,312	6.31	1
Travancore Tamil Nadu Congress	115,893	3.32	1
Kerala Socialist Party	102,098	2.93	0
All India Republican Party	57,815	1.66	0
Tamil Nad Congress Party	36,158	1.04	0
Cochin Party	8,947	0.26	0
Total	3,490,476	100.00	12
Source: ECI

=== By constituency ===
#	Constituency	Turnout	Winner	Party	Runner-up	Party
1	Nagercoil	227,904	A. Nesamony	TTNC	Sivathanu Pillai	Independent
2	Trivandrum	255,044	Annie Mascarene	Independent	T. K. Narayana Pillai	Socialist
3	Chirayinkil	233,287	V. Parameswaran Nair	Independent	T. K. Narayana Pillai	INC
4	Quilon cum Mavelikara	1,028,391	Sreekantan Nair	RSP	Kainikara N. Padmanabha Pillai	INC
4	Quilon cum Mavelikara	1,028,391	R. Velayudhan (SC)	Independent	Kunju Kunju (SC)	INC
5	Alleppey	275,409	P. T. Punnose	Independent	A. P. Udayabhanu	INC
6	Thiruvella	257,600	Mathen C. P.	INC	Narayana Pillai	Socialist
7	Meenachil	267,829	P. T. Chacko	INC	Madhavan Pillai	Independent
8	Kottayam	284,961	C. P. Mathew	INC	Varkey Santhisthan	Independent
9	Ernakulam	247,832	A. M. Thomas	INC	Padmanabha Menon	KSP
10	Crangannur	239,313	K. T. Achyuthan	INC	George Chadayammuri	Independent
11	Trichure	172,906	Iyyunni Chalakka	INC	Joseph Mundaserry	Independent

== Bibliography ==
- Volume I, 1951 Indian general election, 1st Lok Sabha
