= Revolutionary Socialist Party =

Revolutionary Socialist Party may refer to:

== Africa ==
- Party of Socialist Revolution (Algeria)
- Party of Socialist Revolution (Lebanon)
- Revolutionary Socialist Party (Zambia)
- Revolutionary Socialists (Egypt)
- Socialist Revolution Party of Benin
- Somali Revolutionary Socialist Party

== Americas ==
- Revolutionary Socialist Party (Colombia)
- Revolutionary Socialist Party (Peru)
- Revolutionary Socialist Party (Marxist–Leninist), Peru
- Revolutionary Socialist Labor Party (United States)

== Europe ==
- Italian Revolutionary Socialist Party
- Polish Socialist Party - Revolution Faction
- Revolutionary Socialist Party (France), 1890–1901
- Revolutionary Socialist Party (Netherlands)
- Revolutionary Socialist Party (Netherlands, 2022)
- Revolutionary Socialist Party (Portugal)
- Revolutionary Socialist Party (Sweden)
- Revolutionary Socialist Party (UK)
- Revolutionary Socialist Party of Latvia
- Revolutionary Socialist Workers' Party (France)
- Socialist Revolutionary Anarchist Party (Italy)
- Socialist Revolutionary Party (Russia)
- Ukrainian Socialist-Revolutionary Party

== India ==
- Revolutionary Socialist Party (India)
  - Revolutionary Socialist Party of India (Marxist)
  - Revolutionary Socialist Party of Kerala (Bolshevik)
  - Kerala Revolutionary Socialist Party (Baby John)
  - National Revolutionary Socialist Party
  - Revolutionary Socialist Party (Leninist)
  - Revolutionary Socialist Party (Sreekandan Nair)

== Other places ==
- Revolutionary Communist Party of Turkey – Socialist Unity
- Revolutionary Socialist Workers' Party (Turkey)
- Revolutionary Socialist Party (Australia)

== See also ==
- List of socialist parties
- Socialist Revolutionary Party (disambiguation)
- Samajwadi Krantikari Sena (lit. 'Socialist Revolutionary Army'), militia in India
