= Chavara Assembly constituency =

Constituency of the Kerala legislative assembly in India

Chavara
- Constituency No. 117 for the Kerala Legislative Assembly
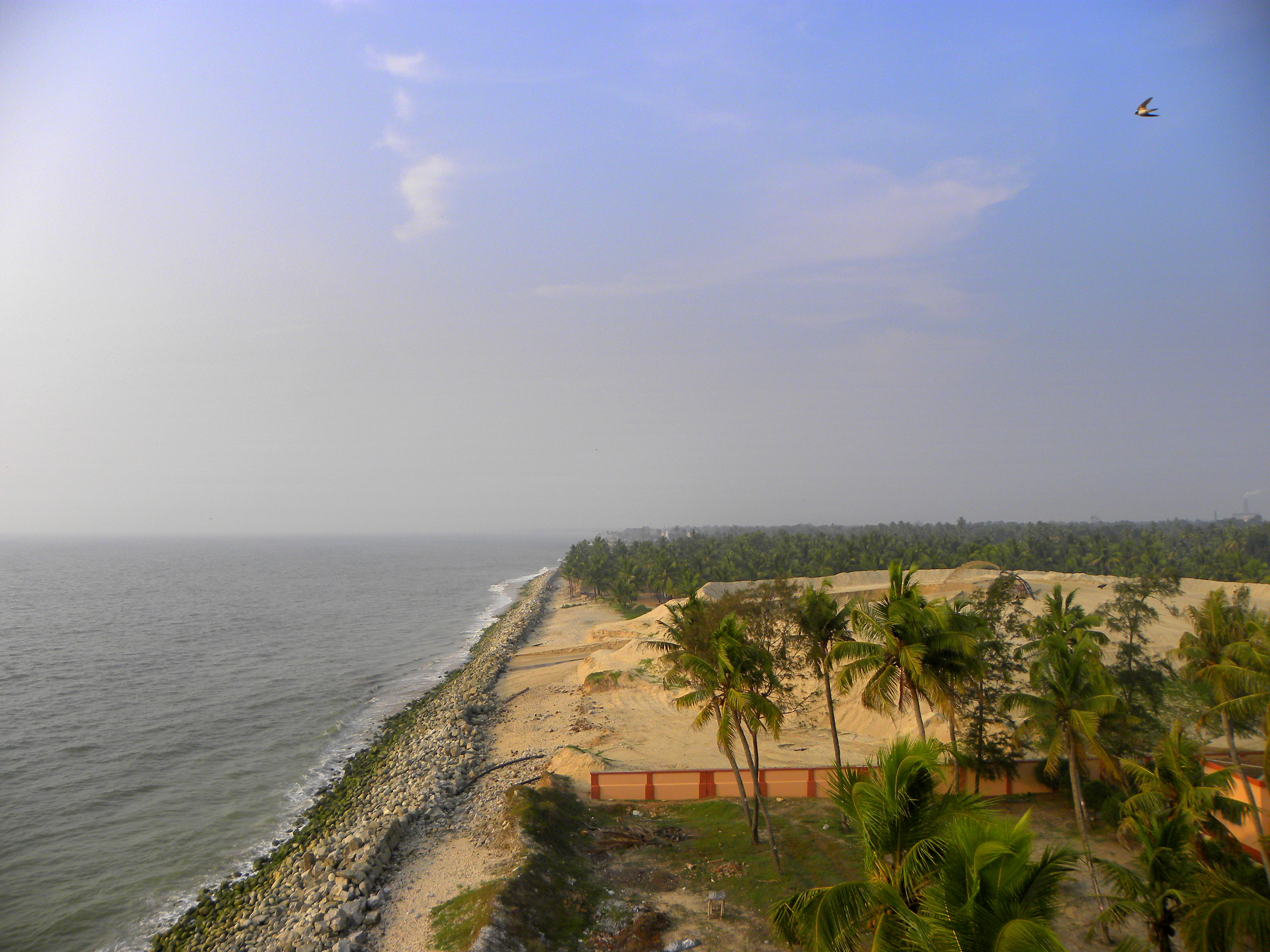
- The coast at Chavara as seen from Kovilthottam Lighthouse

Constituency details
- Country: India
- Region: South India
- State: Kerala
- District: Kollam
- Established: 1977
- Total electors: 1,75,280 (2016)
- Reservation: None

Member of Legislative Assembly
- 16th Kerala Legislative Assembly
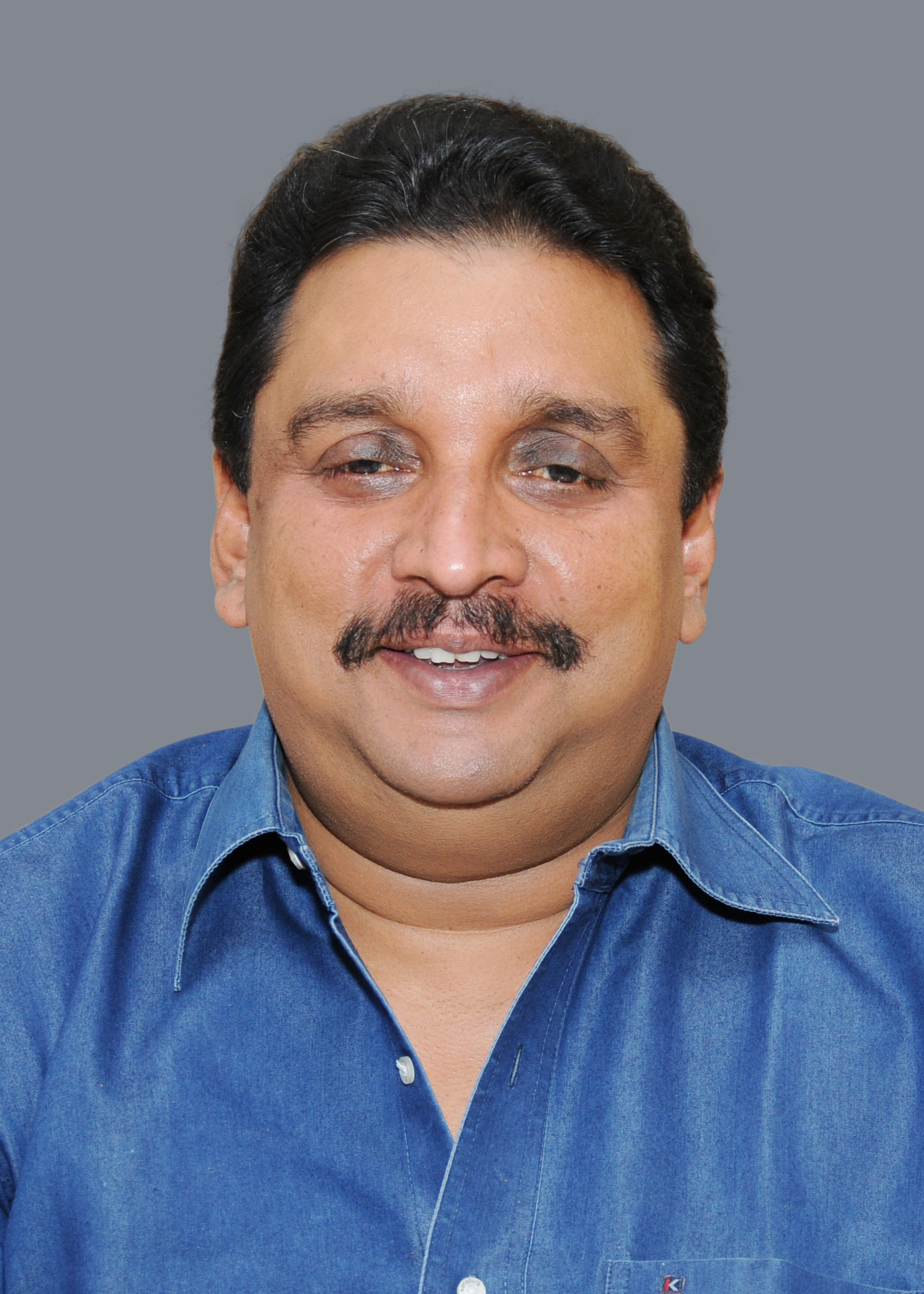
- Incumbent Shibu Baby John
- Party: RSP
- Alliance: UDF
- Elected year: 2026

Chavara State Assembly constituency is a legislative assembly constituency in Kollam district of Kerala, India. It is one of the eleven Assembly constituencies in Kollam district.

== Structure ==
As per the recent changes on Assembly constituency delimitations, Chavara Assembly constituency consists of the seven wards from Kollam Municipal Corporation (Maruthadi, Sakthikulangara, Meenathuchery, Kavanad, Vallikeezhu, Alattukavu, Kannimel) and five neighbouring panchayaths including Chavara, Neendakara, Panmana, Chavara Thekkumbhagom and Thevalakkara.

== Members of Legislative Assembly ==
Year	Member	Political party
Travancore-Cochin
1951	N. Sreekantan Nair	Revolutionary Socialist Party
1954	Baby John	Revolutionary Socialist Party
Kerala
1977	Baby John	Revolutionary Socialist Party
1980	Baby John	Revolutionary Socialist Party
1982	Baby John	Revolutionary Socialist Party
1987	Baby John	Revolutionary Socialist Party
1991	Baby John	Revolutionary Socialist Party
1996	Baby John	Revolutionary Socialist Party
2001	Shibu Baby John	Revolutionary Socialist Party (Bolshevik)
2006	N. K. Premachandran	Revolutionary Socialist Party
2011	Shibu Baby John	Revolutionary Socialist Party
2016 (Note: Bypolls to the vacancy caused by MLA's death stands cancelled as per Election Commission of India.)	Vijayan Pillai	Communist Party of India (Marxist)
2021	Sujith Vijayanpillai (Note: LDF-supported Independent)	Independent politician
2026	Shibu Baby John	Revolutionary Socialist Party

- KRSP(B) is a splinter group of RSP.
- CMP(A) later merged with CPI(M).

== Election results ==
Percentage change (±%) denotes the change in the number of votes from the immediate previous election.

=== 2026 ===
2026 Kerala Legislative Assembly election: Chavara
Party	Candidate	Votes	%	±%
RSP	Shibu Baby John	74,308	52.2	
LDF	Sujith Vijayanpillai	55,735	39.16	
BJP	K. R. Rajesh	11,012	7.74	
NOTA	None of the above	1289	0.91	
Margin of victory		18,573		
Turnout		142344		
RSP gain from LDF		Swing		

=== 2021 ===
There were 1,74,993 registered voters in the constituency for the 2021 Kerala Assembly election.

2021 Kerala Legislative Assembly election: Chavara
Party	Candidate	Votes	%	±%
LDF	Sujith Vijayanpillai	63,282	44.29	▼2.51
RSP	Shibu Baby John	62,186	43.52	▲1.20
BJP	Vivek Gopan	14,211	9.95	▲2.51
Independent	Johnson Kandachira	1,223	0.86	−
Independent	Sujithmon	901	0.63	−
NOTA	None of the above	701	0.49	▲0.01
Independent	Viji Ratheesh	376	0.26	−
Margin of victory		1,096	0.77	▼3.71
Turnout		1,42,189	78.66	▲0.11
LDF hold		Swing	▼2.51	

=== 2016 ===
There were 1,75,916 registered voters in the constituency for the 2016 Kerala Assembly election.

2016 Kerala Legislative Assembly election: Chavara
Party	Candidate	Votes	%	±%
Communist Marxist Party (Aravindakshan)	N. Vijayan Pillai	64,666	46.80	
RSP	Shibu Baby John	58,477	42.32	▼4.02
BJP	M. Sunil	10,276	7.44	▲5.85
PDP	Shahul Thengumthara	1,439	1.04	−
SDPI	Ansar Thevalakkara	1,106	0.80	
NOTA	None of the above	667	0.48	
Independent	Shibu	427	0.31	
BSP	Thevalakkara Manoj	403	0.29	
Independent	Abu Muhammed	228	0.16	
Independent	Anillumar Kallambalam	162	0.12	
Independent	Chellapan	121	0.09	
SS	V. Subash	427	0.31	
Independent	Karamkode Balakrishnan	93	0.07	
Margin of victory		6,189	4.48	
Turnout		1,38,186	78.55	▼1.04
LDF gain from RSP		Swing		

=== 2011 ===
There were 1,59,655 registered voters in the constituency for the 2016 Kerala Assembly election.

2011 Kerala Legislative Assembly election: Chavara
Party	Candidate	Votes	%	±%
KRSP(B)	Shibu Baby John	65,002	51.16	
RSP	N. K. Premachandran	58,941	46.80	▼7.07
BJP	Nalini Sankaramangalam	2,028	1.59	
Independent	Maniyan G.	567	0.45	−
BSP	V. Varadharajan	532	0.42	▼4.48
Margin of victory		6,061	4.77	
Turnout		1,27,068	79.59	
[[KRSP(B)|Kerala Revolutionary Socialist Party (Baby John)]] gain from RSP		Swing		

=== 2006 ===
There were 1,42,401 registered voters in the constituency for the 2006 Kerala Assembly election.

2006 Kerala Legislative Assembly election: Chavara
Party	Candidate	Votes	%	±%
RSP	N. K. Premachandran	54,026	48.9	
Independent	Shibu Baby John	52,240	47.3	
BJP	Udayakumar	1,889	1.7	
RSP(B)	Shibu Balakrishnan	794	0.7	
Independent	Abu Muhammed	761	0.7	
AIADMK	K. Muhammad Kunju	409	0.4	
BSP	Jayakumar	378	0.3	
Margin of victory		1,786	1.6	
Turnout		1,10,501	77.6	
RSP gain from RSP(B)		Swing		

=== 2001 ===
There were 1,53,473 registered voters in the constituency for the 2001 Kerala Assembly election.

2001 Kerala Legislative Assembly election: Chavara
Party	Candidate	Votes	%	±%
RSP(B)	Shibu Baby John	60,689	53.7	
RSP	V. P. Ramakrishna Pillai	52,240	42.6	
BJP	G. Hari	2,831	2.5	
Independent	Sukumaran Pillai	703	0.6	
Independent	Abu Muhammed	618	0.6	
Margin of victory		12,483	11.0	
Turnout		1,13,079	73.7	
RSP(B) gain from RSP		Swing		
