= Velayudhan =

Velayudhan is both a given name and a surname. Notable people with the name include:

- Velayudhan Govindan (died 2015), Indian cricketer
- Dakshayani Velayudhan (1912–1978), Indian politician
- P. K. Velayudhan (born 1946), Indian politician
- Prakash Velayudhan (fl. 2002), Indian cinematographer
- R. Velayudhan (1911–?), Indian politician

== See also ==
- Dakshayani Velayudhan Award
