= Yeroor =

yeroor
- Village
- Location within Kerala
- Coordinates: 08°55′45″N 76°55′05″E
- Country: India
- State: Kerala
- District: Kollam
- Taluk: Punalur

Languages
  - shrfinOfficial: Malayalam, Tamil
- Time zone: UTC+5:30 (IST)
- Telephone code: 0475
- Vehicle registration: KL-25, KL-77
- Nearest city: Punalur
- Lok Sabha constituency: Kollam
- Literacy: 93.63%

Yeroor is a village situated near Anchal, Kollam district, Kerala, India.

== Politics ==
Yeroor is a part of Punalur assembly constituency in Kollam (Lok Sabha constituency). Shri. P S SUPAL is the current MLA of Punalur. Shri.N. K. Premachandran is the current member of parliament of Kollam.
