= Rationalist Association of India =

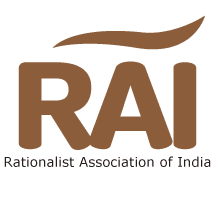
- Abbreviation: RAI
- Founded: 1930; 96 years ago
- Type: Non-profit
- Purpose: Advocacy of rationalism, atheism, secularism, humanism
- Location: India
- Founder President: Dr. D' Avoine
- Current Chairman: Sreeni Pattathanam
- Affiliations: Voting member at International Humanist and Ethical Union (IHEU)

Rationalist Association of India (RAI) is an Indian rationalist organization that was established in 1930. Dr. D' Avoine was the President of the Rationalist Association of India (RAI) from 1938 to 1944. It is a full voting member of International Humanist and Ethical Union (IHEU), a global representative body of the humanist movement, uniting a diversity of non-religious organisations and individuals.

India's first blasphemy protection happened in 1933 when Dr. D'Avoine published an article titled "Religion and Morality" in the September 1933 issue of Reason, the official journal of RAI at that period. The Bombay Police confiscated all the copies of Reason and arrested Dr. D'Avoine and charged him under IPC 295A. On 5 March 1934, Sir H.P. Dastur, the Chief Presidency Magistrate of Bombay, dismissed the case by saying that "The accused may be wrong.... But the article merely represents the writer's view."

== Current officials of RAI ==
Chairman : Sreeni Pattathanam

- President : Kura Hanumantha Rao
- Vice President: Gumma Veeranna
- Secretary : Meduri Sathyanarayana

== Connected organisations ==
Affiliated organisations: Bharatheeya Yukthivadi Sangham (Indian Rationalist Association), Nastik Nation, Radical Humanist Centre, HEMA Publication ('HE'thuvadi-'MA'navavadi Publication).

== See also ==
- Ravipudi Venkatadri
- Sreeni Pattathanam
