= Vijayan Pillai =

Indian politician (1951–2020)

N. Vijayan Pillai
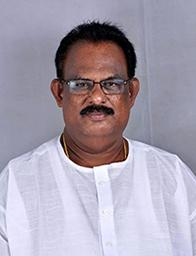
- Portrait of N. Vijayan Pillai

Member of Kerala Legislative Assembly
- In office 2016–2020
- Preceded by: Shibu Baby John
- Succeeded by: Sujith Vijayanpillai
- Constituency: Chavara

Personal details
- Born: 2 April 1951
- Died: 8 March 2020 (aged 68)
- Party: CPI(M)
- Children: 3

N. Vijayan Pillai (2 April 1951 – 8 March 2020) was an Indian politician and a member of the 14th Kerala Legislative Assembly. He represented the Chavara constituency in the Kerala Legislative Assembly as a CMP candidate. He started his political career as a panchayat member in 1979, and continued in that role for 20 years. He was a member of the Kollam District Panchayat from 2000 to 2005.

He was born to V. Narayanan Pillai, a veteran RSP leader, and Bhavani Amma, on 2 April 1951. Vijayan Pillai was a member of the CPI-M and won the legislative assembly election with a groundbreaking victory never imagined in the history of the Chavara constituency, as he defeated Shibu Baby John, the sitting MLA. Vijayan Pillai was known for his social service in the Chavara society and for his welfare programs. He introduced a significant number of reforms aimed at the social upliftment of the common man in the Chavara constituency. His son, Sujith Vijayanpillai, is the current Member of the Kerala Legislative Assembly from Chavara.

He was a prominent leader in the region who worked to create employment opportunities for the youth and consistently strived for the social development of the Chavara constituency with the support of NGOs and the ruling LDF government's policies. He was committed to reducing unemployment by engaging youth with skill-based programs and by connecting major business leaders from the region, as well as NRIs, to support the initiative.

== Death ==
Pillai died of age-related illness on 8 March 2020 at Aster Medcity in Kochi. His funeral was conducted on 9 March 2020 at his native village in Kollam.
