= Uliyakovil =

Uliyakovil Uliyakkovil
- Neighbourhood
- Location in Kollam, India Uliyakovil (Kerala) Uliyakovil (India)
- Coordinates: 8.902111°N 76.602248°E
- Country: India
- State: Kerala
- City: Kollam

Government
  - Body: Kollam Municipal Corporation(KMC)

Population (2011)
  - Total: 6,023

Languages
  - Official: Malayalam, English
- Time zone: UTC+5:30 (IST)
- PIN: 691019
- Vehicle registration: KL-02
- Lok Sabha constituency: Kollam
- Civic agency: Kollam Municipal Corporation
- Avg. summer temperature: 34 °C (93 °F)
- Avg. winter temperature: 22 °C (72 °F)
- Website: http://www.kollam.nic.in

Uliyakovil or Uliyakkovil is a thickly populated neighbourhood of the city of Kollam, India. It is the 11th ward in Kollam Municipal Corporation, Kerala. Uliyakovil is one of the major contributors to the city's seafood exports. There is a publication house also.

== Description ==
Uliyakovilis a neighbourhood of Kollam city that shares its borders with lake Ashtamudi. Previously there were two different municipal councils for this huge area (Uliyakovil West and Uliyakovil East), but they merged and formed a single council in 2005. Some of the major city roads pass through this area.

Uliyakovil has a lot of area which looks into the backwaters of Ashtamudi Kayal.

The Uliyakovil area once a rural village is soon transforming into an urban area with real estate costs skyrocketing. And with close proximity to hospitals, schools in Kollam city and other main institutions it is back on the map. There was a proposal from Kollam Municipal Corporation and ex-MLA from Kollam constituency, P. K. Gurudasan for the preparation of a detailed project report for the construction of a bypass road connecting the Kollam-Theni National Highway-208 from Kollam city to Kundara via Nair's Hospital junction, Uliyakovil, Mangad and Thannikkamukku, but the project still has not materialised.

A publication firm Harisri publication is working here from 2003

== Public/private institutions near Uliyakovil ==
- City Central School™
- Mangalasseri Cars
- Dr. Nair's Hospital
- Kings Marine Products
- ESIC Model & Super Speciality Hospital
- St. Mary's English Medium Public School
- Apparel Training and Design Centre
- R.P.Bankers
- T.I.M.E Kids Preschool
- Harisri Publications
