= N. Peethambarakurup =

Indian politician

N. Peethambara Kurup is the member of parliament from Kollam Lok Sabha seat in Kerala. He belongs to Indian National Congress. He is a follower of former Kerala Chief Minister K. Karunakaran.
