= V. Parameswaran Nayar =

Indian politician (1918–1990)

V. Parameswaran Nair

Member of Parliament for Chirayinkil
- In office 1952–1957
- Preceded by: Inaugural Holder
- Succeeded by: M.K. Kumaran

Member of Parliament for Quilon
- In office 1957–1962
- Preceded by: N. Sreekantan Nair
- Succeeded by: N. Sreekantan Nair

Personal details
- Born: June 1918 Trivandrum, Kingdom of Travancore
- Died: 19 December 1990 (aged 72)
- Spouse: M.K. Lalitha
- Children: 3 sons

Velu Pillai Parameswaran Nair (June 1918 — 19 December 1990) was an Indian politician from Kerala who served as a member of Lok Sabha, representing Chirayinkil and Quilon Lok Sabha constituencies.

== Early life ==
V. Parameswaran Nair was born in June 1918 at Trivandrum. He was the son of well known and aristocrat Sadasyatilaka Shri T. K. Velu Pillai and Bhagavathi Amma. He was the younger brother of renowned Mali Madhavan Nair. He was educated at Model School, Trivandrum, H.H. the Maharaja's College of Science in Trivandrum, American College, Presidency College and Law College, Trivandrum. He married Shrimati M.K. Lalitha, niece of the famous writer "Pandalam K.P" in 1949 and had three sons. His children are Dr. Sasidharan, a skin specialist, Dr. Harikumar, an orthopedist, both working in UK and the youngest of three Viswanathan Nair runs Thilak paints which manufacture paints from cashew oil established by his father five years prior to the later's death.

== Career ==
He was a lawyer in Travancore Government Service from 1939 to 1947. He was a person with active interest in sports and won several sports championships. He and his elder brother Mali were very good at tennis and often played along.

== Political career ==
Nayar was elected to the Loksabha for first time as an independent candidate with support of the Communist Party by defeating Paravur T K Narayana Pillai former Chief Minister of Travancore-Cochin. After that he was acclaimed as giant killer in Kerala politics. In 1957, Nayar defeated N Sreekantan Nair, the Kerala Socialist Party stalwart over a margin of above 1.69 lakh votes.

In Loksabha, he was the sound of opposition against monstrous Congress majority and well accepted by Pandit Nehru especially for his oratory skills. Shakespeare, Keats and Byron played cameos in his satirical orations as well. His courage and intelligence can be seen in an instance when P S Rao was advisor to the Governor when the first communist ministry of Kerala was dismissed, before presenting the budget in the assembly; letters went to Kerala MPs for a discussion, which was signed by his driver R. Achuthan Nair which paid in the same way.

== Later life ==
Nayar stayed away from mainstream politics after the split in Communist party. He settled down near the lake of Sasthamcotta. He started the Weekly "Keralasabdam" a publication known for political writings. He later attempted to translate "The Travancore State Manuel" into Malayalam which was lost by the department of culture.
