= P. K. Gurudasan =

Indian politician and trade unionist

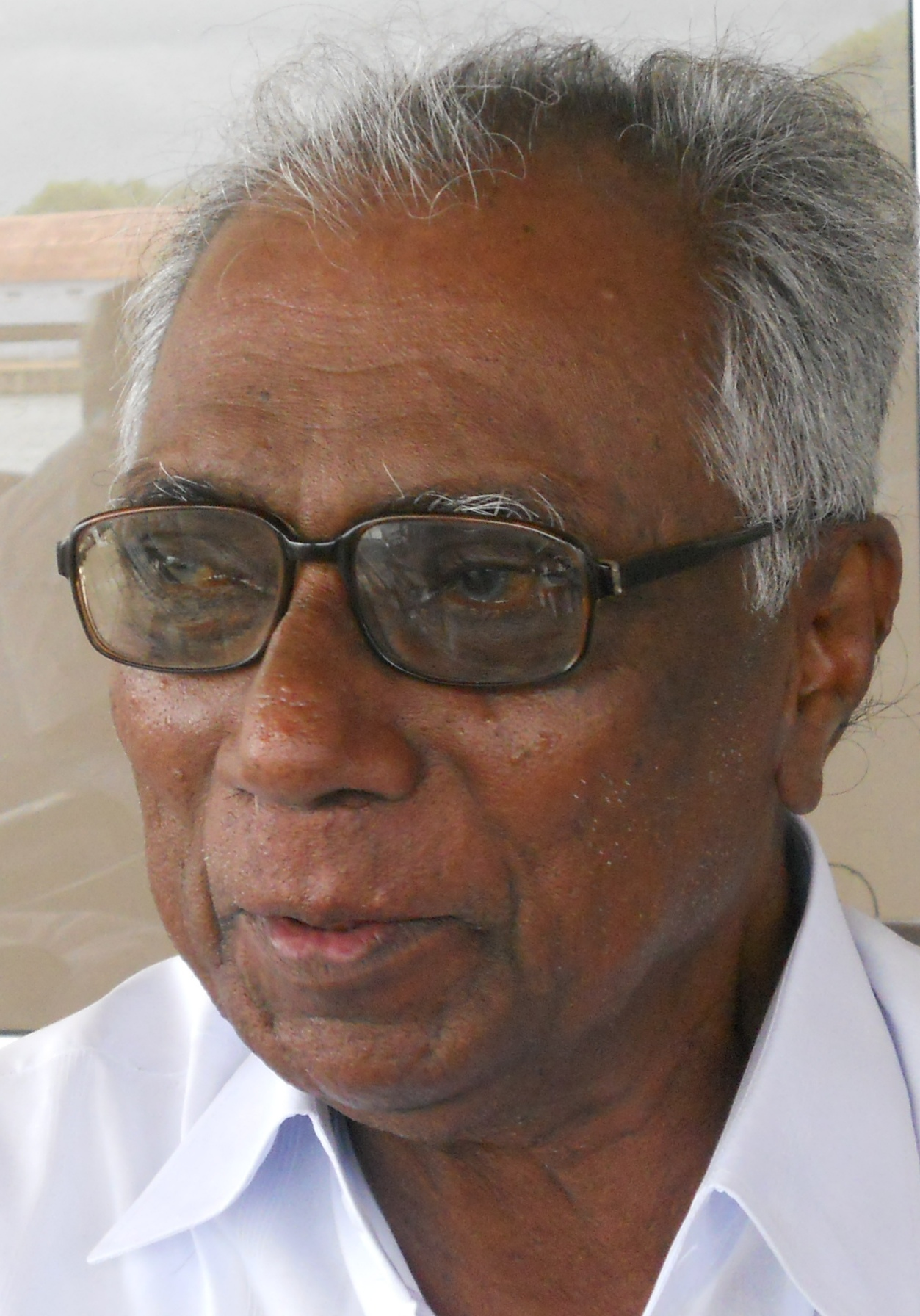

Member of Kerala Legislative Assembly
- In office 2011–2016
- Preceded by: Himself
- Succeeded by: M. Mukesh
- Constituency: Kollam

Minister of Excise, Labour and Employment
- In office 2006–2011
- Preceded by: Babu Divakaran
- Succeeded by: Shibu Baby John as (Minister of Labour and Employment); K. Babu as (Minister of Excise)
- Constituency: Kollam

Personal details
- Born: 10 July 1935 (age 91) Paravur, Kollam district, Kerala, India
- Party: Communist Party of India (Marxist)
- Spouse: C. Lilly
- Children: Seema Diva Roopa Giri

P. Krishnan Gurudasan (born 10 July 1935) is an Indian politician, trade unionist, and a member of Communist Party of India (Marxist). He was the Minister for Excise, Labour and Employment in the Government of Kerala headed by VS Achuthanandan between 2006 and 2011. He represented Kollam Assembly constituency in the Kerala Legislative Assembly from 2006 to 2016. He is also the State President of Centre of Indian Trade Unions (CITU) and a member of Central Committee of CPI(M). Gurudasan earlier served as the General Secretary of Kerala State unit of CITU.

== Career ==
Gurudasan was born to Krishnan and Yesodha on 10 July 1935 at Paravur in Kollam district. After completing his school and college education Gurudasan joined the Communist party at a young age. He was jailed during the Emergency period for 19 months in Poojappura Central Prison.

== See also ==
- Kerala Council of Ministers
