= T. K. Divakaran =

Indian politician and trade unionist

Comrade T. K. Divakaran

Minister For Public Works and Tourism, Government of Kerala
- In office 06 March 1967 - 21 October 1969
- Preceded by: P. P. Ummer Koya
- Succeeded by: C. Achutha Menon
- In office 04 October 1970 - 19 January 1976
- Preceded by: C. Achutha Menon
- Succeeded by: K. Pankajakshan

Member of Kerala Legislative Assembly
- In office 1967-1976
- Preceded by: Henry Austin
- Succeeded by: Thyagarajan
- Constituency: Kollam

Personal details
- Born: 8 December 1920 Pattathanam, Kollam
- Died: 19 January 1976 (aged 55) Government Medical College Hospital, Thiruvananthapuram
- Party: Revolutionary Socialist Party
- Spouse: Devayani
- Children: 7 children

T. K. Divakaran (8 December 1920 – 19 January 1976 in Pattathanam, Kollam) was a Malayali politician, trade unionist and a former member of Kerala Legislative Assembly. He was also a Minister in the E. M. S. Namboodiripad led Kerala Government.

Divakaran was born on 8 December 1920 in Kollam. He studied up to SSLC and after his education joined the trade union politics in Kerala. He became an influential trade union leader in Kollam. He came to active politics through the Trade Union Sector. He was an active member of the State Congress in the erstwhile state of Travancore. He was also known as an orator. He was jailed many times for his involvement in the Freedom Movement, Punnapra-Vayalar uprising, etc. He was one of the founder members of the Kerala Socialist Party (KSP) and later joined the Revolutionary Socialist Party (RSP). He was elected to the Legislative Assembly in 1952 and 1954. He served as the Municipal Chairman of Kollam, Central Committee Member of the Revolutionary Socialist Party, State President of U.T.U.C. He was the Minister of Public Works in the E. M. S. Namboodiripad Ministry from 1967 to 1969. He was also the Minister of Public Works in the C. Achutha Menon led Ministry from 1970 till his death in January 1976. His son Babu Divakaran was Labour Minister in the A. K. Antony and Oommen Chandy led Ministries.
