= A. V. Thamarakshan =

Indian politician (born 1946)

A. Velu Thamarakshan (born 24 April 1946) is a politician from the South Indian state of Kerala. He has been member of Kerala Legislative Assembly multiple times. he started his political career with RSP which later on split to form RSP (Bolshevik). RSP(B) went on to merge with Janathipathiya Samrakshana Samithy in 2009. Thamarakshan has also been independent candidate. In September 2021, he elected as the president of the JSS.

== Political career ==
=== RSP leader ===
A long-time member of the Revolutionary Socialist Party (RSP), A. V. Thamarakshan rose to the ranks of Central Committee member and Kerala state secretariat member. He was also the president of the United Trade Union Congress and various individual trade unions. He stood as a RSP candidate in the Mararikulam seat in the 1977 Kerala Legislative Assembly election. He won the seat with 39,094 votes (50.43%), defeating CPI(M) candidate P.K. Chandrandan. He retained the seat in the 1980 election, obtaining 45,714 votes (55.50%), defeating independent candidate Raju Gangadharan. During this tenure he was the chairman of the Committee on Subordinate Legislation. In the 1982 election he got 44,567 votes (51.10%), defeating independent candidate Pachady Sreedharan.

A. V. Thamarakshan stood as the LDF candidate in the Haripad constituency in the 1987 Kerala Legislative Assembly election, finishing in second place with 45,603 votes (46.07%). He lost the seat to Indian National Congress candidate Ramesh Chennithala. He was elected to the Legislative Assembly in a bye-election in the Haripad constituency held on 27 February 1990. However, he lost the Haripad seat in the 1991 election. He obtained 52,376 votes (48.62%) and was defeated by Congress candidate K.K. Sreenivasan. He re-took the Haripad seat in the 1996 election, obtaining 54,055 votes (50.26%) and defeating Congress candidate N. Mohan Kumar. During this tenure, the chairman of the Kerala state legislative environmental commission.

=== Split in RSP ===
On 25 March 1999 A. V. Thamarakshan and Babu Divakaran were expelled from the RSP by party state secretariat, for breaking party discipline. After the split he became the general secretary of the Revolutionary Socialist Party.

In the 2001 election he stood as the RSP(B) candidate in Haripad. He finished in second place with 55,252 votes (46.58%). He was defeated by CPI(M) candidate T.K. Devakumar.

=== In JSS ===
In 2009 A. V. Thamarakshan's party merged with the Janathipathiya Samrakshana Samithy. He became a state committee member of JSS. He filed nominations as a JSS candidate in Cherthala constituency in the 2011 assembly elections, but withdrew his candidature before the polls.

In June 2012 A. V. Thamarakshan resigned from the JSS, citing that UDF had failed to maintain harmony between religious communities.

=== 2014 election ===
A. V. Thamarakshan declared his candidacy for the Alappuzha Lok Sabha seat in the 2014 general election. Standing as an independent, his candidature was supported by BJP.

== Personal life ==
Thamarakshan is the son of V. Velu. He resides in Alappuzha. He is married to Dr. K. M. Sukrutha Latha and has two sons.
