= K. R. Aravindakshan =

Indian politician (died 2017)

K. R. Aravindakshan (died 27 September 2017) was an Indian communist leader from Kerala, India. He was born in Kottayam.

He was the General secretary of Communist Marxist Party. He died on 27 September 2017.
