= Sujith Vijayanpillai =

Indian politician

Member of Kerala Legislative Assembly
- In office 2 May 2021 – 23 May 2026
- Preceded by: Vijayan Pillai
- Succeeded by: Shibu Baby John
- Constituency: Chavara

Personal details
- Party: Independent

Sujith Vijayanpillai is an Indian politician from Kerala. He was elected as a member of the 15th Kerala Legislative Assembly. He represented Chavara constituency in Kerala Legislative Assembly as an independent candidate of Left Democratic Front.

== Personal life ==
He is the son of late former MLA N. Vijayan Pillai and Suma. He is a medical doctor. He has two siblings, Sreejith and Sreelakshmi.

== Career ==
Vijayanpillai is a first-time MLA winning from the Chavara Constituency previously represented by his late father. He won the 2021 Kerala Legislative Assembly Election as an independent defeating Shibu Baby John by a thin margin of 1,096 votes.
