= Mathai Manjooran =

Indian politician

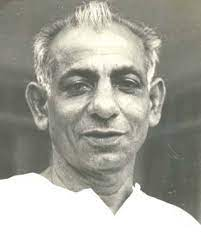

Minister for Labour, Second Namboodiripad ministry
- In office 1967–1969
- Preceded by: T. V. Thomas

Personal details
- Party: Kerala Socialist Party

Mathai Manjooran (13 October 1912 – 14 January 1970) was an Indian independence activist from Kerala, socialist revolutionary, founder of the Kerala Socialist Party, Member of Parliament, Minister of Labour (economics) in the second E.M.S. Namboodiripad communist ministry, and above all a proponent for the formation of the Kerala State.

Manjooran was a graduate of Madras University. He was an alumnus of St Thomas College, Thrissur.
