= M. K. Kannan =

Indian politician (born 1948)

Member of the Kerala Legislative Assembly for Thrissur
- In office 1980–1982
- Preceded by: K. J. George
- Succeeded by: Therambil Ramakrishnan

Personal details
- Born: 29 December 1948 (age 77) Thrissur
- Party: Communist Party of India (Marxist)
- Other political affiliations: Communist Marxist Party (1977–2023)
- Spouse: Remani
- Children: 2
- Profession: Politician

M. K. Kannan (born 29 December 1948 ) is an Indian politician and leader of the Communist Party of India (Marxist). He was the former general secretary of Communist Marxist Party. He represented Thrissur constituency in the Kerala Legislative Assembly from 1980 to 1982. He is the first Vice president of Kerala Bank.
