= N. Peethambara Kurup =

Indian politician (born 1942)

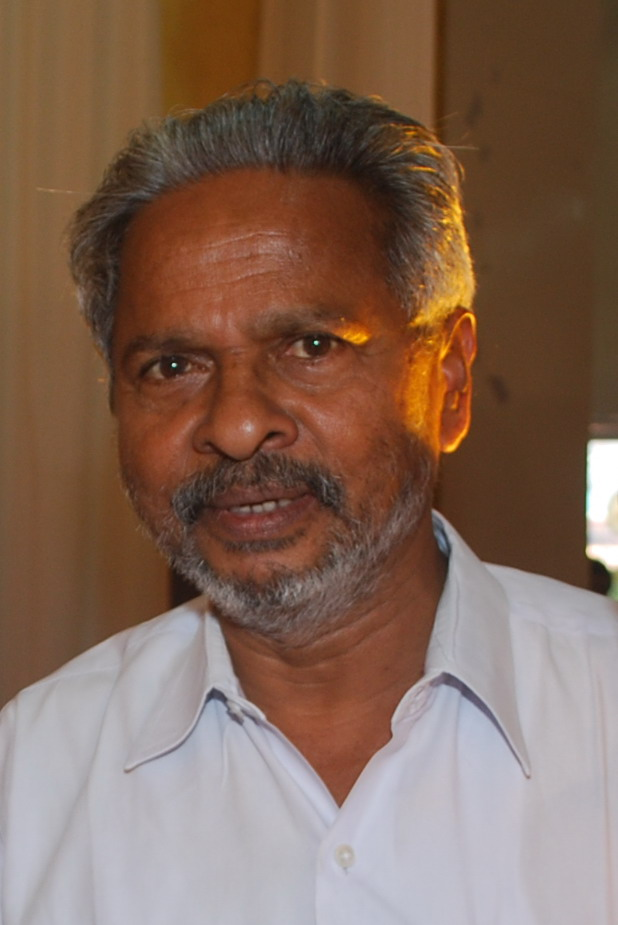

Member of Parliament, Lok Sabha
- In office 2009 – 2014
- Preceded by: P. Rajendran
- Succeeded by: N. K. Premachandran
- Constituency: Kollam

Personal details
- Born: 24 May 1942 (age 84) Navaikulam, Kingdom of Travancore, British India (present day Thiruvananthapuram, Kerala, India)
- Party: Indian National Congress
- Education: Bachelor of Arts; Bachelor of Laws
- Alma mater: The Kerala Law Academy Law College, Thiruvananthapuram

N. Peethambara Kurup (born 24 May 1942) is an Indian politician who is a member of the Indian National Congress. He has served as a member of Lok Sabha representing Kollam Lok Sabha constituency from 2009 to 2014.

He was born in Navaikulam in the erstwhile Kingdom of Travancore and has completed his B.A. and LL.B. from The Kerala Law Academy Law College, Thiruvananthapuram. He was the Vice President of Kerala Pradesh Congress Committee. He unsuccessfully contested to Kerala Assembly from Vamanapuram.

He was also District Congress Committee president of Thiruvananthapuram for five years since 2000. He was a Staunch loyalist of K. Karunakaran. Then, he went over to National Congress Party and serves as its State General Secretary, and returned to Congress with senior Congress leader K. Karunakaraan.

He was elected to the Lok Sabha for the first time in the 2009 general election defeating P. Rajendran of the Communist Party of India (Marxist) by a margin of 17531 votes. He was Chairman of Guruvayur Devaswom Board from 2015 to 2016.

He was a teacher in the Kadambattukonam High School and in 1964 resigned to become an active politician. He is known for his oratorical skills and is the author of two books in Malayalam, Kiranangal, a play and Sahithya Dhara, an essay anthology.

== Controversies ==
In 2013, South Indian actress Shwetha Menon alleged that Kurup had molested her while the two were attending a function. Shweta later dropped her complaint against Kurup, after he made a "personal apology" to her hours after FIR was lodged against him.

Preceded by P. Rajendran	Member of Parliament from Kollam; 2009 – 2014	Succeeded by N.K. Premachandran
