= A. A. Rahim =

Indian politician (1920–1995)

Abubakar Abdul Rahim
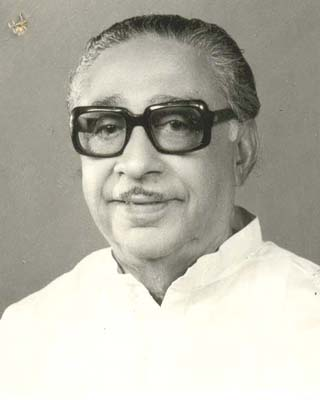

Governor of Meghalaya
- In office 27 July 1989 – 8 May 1990
- Preceded by: Harideo Joshi
- Succeeded by: Madhukar Dighe

Union Minister of State in the Ministry of External Affairs
- In office 2 September 1982 – 31 October 1984
- Prime Minister: Indira Gandhi
- Succeeded by: Ram Niwas Mirdha
- In office 4 November 1984 – 31 December 1984

Union Minister of State in the Ministry of Law, Justice and Company Affairs
- In office 15 January 1982 – 2 September 1982
- Prime Minister: Indira Gandhi

Minister for Health, Agriculture and Industries, Travancore-Cochin state
- In office 1955–1956
- Chief Minister: Panampilly Govinda Menon

Member of Parliament, Lok Sabha
- In office 1980–1984
- Preceded by: Vayalar Ravi
- Succeeded by: Thalekkunnil Basheer
- Constituency: Chirayinkeezhu

Member of Kerala Legislative Assembly
- In office 1970–1980
- Preceded by: P. K. Sukumaran
- Succeeded by: V. V. Joseph
- Constituency: Kundara
- In office 1957–1964
- Preceded by: Inaugural holder
- Succeeded by: T. K. Divakaran
- Constituency: Quilon

Personal details
- Born: 7 February 1920
- Died: 31 August 1995 (aged 75)
- Party: Indian National Congress
- Spouse: Smt. Fathima
- Children: 3 sons, 3daughter

Abubakar Abdul Rahim (7 February 1920 – 31 August 1995) was an Indian politician, freedom fighter, and union minister. He was born to Sri Abubeker in Kollam. The government-run District Hospital of Kollam district was renamed after him in commemoration.

== Early life and education ==
A. A. Rahim was born on February 7, 1920, in Chirayinkeezhu village in Travancore state, as the son of Shri Abubeker Kunju. He completed his primary education from Govt. English School, Quilon. He later went to St. Berchman's College, Changanassery. Subsequently, he earned a degree from Mohammadans College Madras and after University College Trivandrum. He was a social and political activist in his early life.

== Political career ==
He came through the Student Movement of the Indian National Congress. He became the President of the District Congress Committee of Kollam, and also held position viz. KPCC Executive Member, AICC Member. He held portfolios like Industries, Health, Agriculture in the Panampilli Govinda Menon's Travancore Cochin State Ministry in 1954. He was elected to the Kerala Legislative Assembly in 1957, '60, '65, '70, '77. In 1965 he was elected to the legislative assembly but no single party could form a ministry commanding majority and hence this election is considered abortive. On March 25, President's rule was invoked for the fourth time. In 1980 he was elected to the Loksabha from Chirayinkil Constituency and served as the Union Minister of State for External Affairs, Justice, Law and company affairs in the Third Indira Gandhi Ministry from 1982-84. In 1989–90 he also served as the Governor of Meghalaya.

== Other positions held ==
- KPCC Vice President
- President Quilon DCC
- Member, AICC
- Member, Governing Council, Indian Institute of Technology, Madras
- Chairman, Iqbal Arts College, Trivandrum
- Member, Cochin University Senate
- Chairman, Governing Council, Thangal Kunju Musliar Engineering College, Quilon
- Chairman, Malikdhinar Educational Trust, Quilon
- Member, Central Wakf Board
- Director, Hindustan Insecticides
- Board Member, United Electricals and Allied Industries, Khadi and Village Industries
- Deputy Leader, Kerala Legislative Assembly
- Chairman, Public Accounts Committee, Committee on Subordinate Legislation, Estimates Committee and several other legislative committees.
- Member, Committee of Privileges.
- Managing Editor, Prabhatham Daily

== See also ==
- Vayalar Ravi
- T. K. Divakaran
- Ram Niwas Mirdha
