= S. Krishna Kumar =

Indian retired civil servant and politician

- Born: 6 September 1939 (age 87); Kowdiar, Travancore, British India
- Occupations: Civil service officer; politician
- Years active: 1963 – present
- Political party: Bharatiya Janata Party
- Spouse: Usha Krishna Kumar (m. 1970)
- Children: 2

S. Krishna Kumar (born 6 September 1939) is an Indian former IAS officer, technocrat, and politician from Kerala. He was a former leader of Indian National Congress in Kerala and joined the Bharatiya Janata Party on 20 April 2019.

He has been elected to the Lok Sabha three times during 80s and 90s, and was also a minister in the Rajiv Gandhi ministry and Rao ministry. He served as a member of the Lok Sabha representing Quilon (Lok Sabha constituency). He was elected to 8th, 9th and 10th Lok Sabha.

== Personal life ==
He was born in Kowdiar in erstwhile Travancore, British India (present-day Thiruvananthapuram district, Kerala, India) on 6 September 1939 as son of C. P. Shankara Pillai. He got married in June 1970 to Usha Krishna Kumar, who later became the general secretary of All India Mahila Congress. He has two children, one son and a daughter. His daughter was married to the family of Khushwant Singh. He is currently settled in Delhi.

== Career ==
He completed graduation in Mechanical engineering from University of Kerala with gold medal in the year 1960.

=== Bureaucrat ===
He cleared the Indian Civil Service exam and joined the Indian Administrative Service in the year 1963. While in service he served as District magistrate of Ernakulam district from 1969 to 1973. During this period he spearheaded family planning and land reforms projects in the district. This efforts helped Kerala reduce population growth and ensure fair redistribution of land. He is also regarded as the architect of 'modern Kochi' because of efforts to develop city into a modern city through institutions such as Greater Cochin Development Authority (GCDA)and also he was founding chairman of GCDA from 1976 to 1980. He has also served in the capacities of Civil Supplies Commissioner, Industries Commissioner, Principal Secretary (Industries, Local Administration, Urban Development, Fisheries & Social welfare) in Government of Kerala.

=== Politics ===
He quit Indian Administrative Service and entered politics in 1980 through Indian National Congress and K. Karunakaran as his mentor. He expected a seat in 1982 Kerala Legislative Assembly election but that didn't come through. However he was appointed as the chairman of HLL Lifecare, a central Public sector undertaking. It was a loss making entity and was transformed into a leading Condom and medical accessories manufacturer in Asia. Then he moved to Kollam and started becoming active in Trade union activities of Cashew industry in Kollam. In 1984 CAPEX the only cooperative in cashew sector was started in his leadership. Soon he got elected into Lok Sabha from Kollam (Lok Sabha constituency) in the 8th, 9th and 10th Lok Sabha.

He was a Union Minister handling Ministries of Health and Family Welfare, Textiles, Information and Broadcasting from 1984 to 1989 in Rajiv Gandhi ministry and Ministries of Petroleum and Natural Gas, Defence, Non Conventional Energy and Agriculture in Rao ministry from 1991 to 1996. He worked for universalisation of Television in India and established microwave link across Kerala in record time.

In 1990's there were a series of allegations were raised against Krishna Kumar, including amassing of wealth disproportionate to the known sources of income and benami real estate deals. His wife Usha Krishnakumar was arrested for violation of the Foreign Exchange Regulation Act and was sent to Tihar Jail. In elections to the 11th Lok Sabha of 1996, Krishna Kumar lost to N. K. Premachandran. Nina Pillai, wife of biscuit tycoon Rajan Pillai also contested this elections as a BJP-supported candidate against Krishna Kumar. Following this he distanced himself from electoral politics and took on the role of an education and industrial consultant. There are many analysts who believe that, machinations against K. Karunakaran within Indian National Congress both at national level and state level due to differences he had with Rao and Antony along with the downfall of Karunakaran's clout both at Kerala and Delhi following the ISRO espionage case have seriously impacted the political career of Karunakaran loyalists like Krishnakumar.

In 2003, he left Indian National Congress due to differences with K. Karunakaran and joined Bharatiya Janata Party. He contested in BJP ticket from Mavelikara (Lok Sabha constituency) for the 2004 Indian general election. However, in 2006 he joined back in the Indian National Congress. He was active in poll campaigns of 2014 elections for Indian National Congress.

In 2014, he did a doctorate in Public policy from Birla Institute of Technology and Science, Pilani.

In 2019 at his age of 80, he again left Congress and joined Bharatiya Janata Party.
