= Socialist Revolutionary Party (disambiguation) =

Socialist Revolutionary Party was a major political party in Imperial Russia from 1902 to its functional dissolution in 1921 and official disbandment in 1940

Socialist Revolutionary Party may also refer to:

- Socialist Revolutionary Party (France)
- Socialist Revolutionary Party (Persia)

== See also ==
- Revolutionary Socialist Party (disambiguation)
