= Pattathanam =

- Neighbourhood
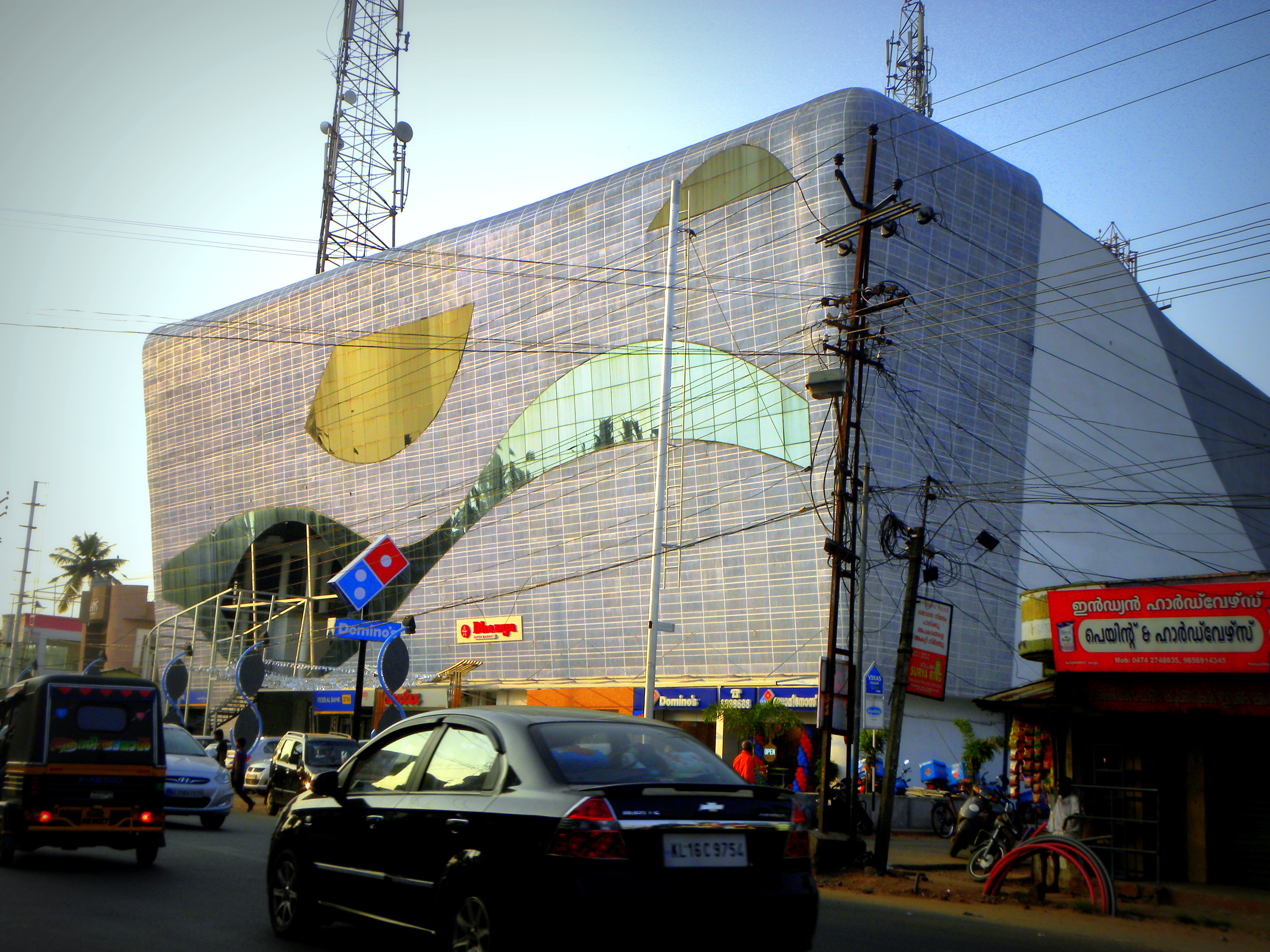
- An upcoming mall under construction near Pattathanam
- Nickname: Land of Anthass
- Location in Kollam, India Pattathanam (Kerala) Pattathanam (India)
- Coordinates: 8.88°N 76.6071°E
- Country: India
- State: Kerala
- District: Kollam

Government
  - Body: Kollam Municipal Corporation(KMC)

Languages
  - Official: Malayalam, English
- Time zone: UTC+5:30 (IST)
- PIN: 691021
- Vehicle registration: KL-02
- Lok Sabha constituency: Kollam
- Civic agency: Kollam Municipal Corporation
- Avg. summer temperature: 34 °C (93 °F)
- Avg. winter temperature: 22 °C (72 °F)
- Website: http://www.kollam.nic.in

Pattathanam is a residential area in the city of Kollam in Kerala, southwest India. It is located 4 kilometres (2.5 mi) from Chinnakkada, the commercial hub of Kollam city. It is home to various educational institutions. The Latin Catholic (Roman Catholic Latin Church) Bharata Rajni Church, Subrahmanya Swami Temple, Ammannada Ardhanarishvara temple (Family temple of Kaliyilil puthen veedu earlier and presently run by NSS), St. John's Marthoma Church, St. Thomas CSI Church are located in Pattathanam.

== Schools and colleges ==
Schools and colleges located in the area include Vimala Hridaya Catholic Girls High School, Krist Raj Boys High School, Balika Mariyam LPS, Fatima Mata National College and Bishop Jerome College of Engineering.

== Notable individuals ==
Notable individuals born in Pattathanam include:

- Suresh Babu, Olympian
- Babu Divakaran, politician and former Kerala minister
- Dr A. V. George, member of Kerala State Commission for Backward Classes
- Mukesh, actor and producer
- Sreeni Pattathanam, rationalist writer
- Vidhu Vincent, filmmaker and writer
- Alakananda, TV news anchor
