= P. Rajendran =

Indian politician

- പി. രാജേന്ദ്രൻ
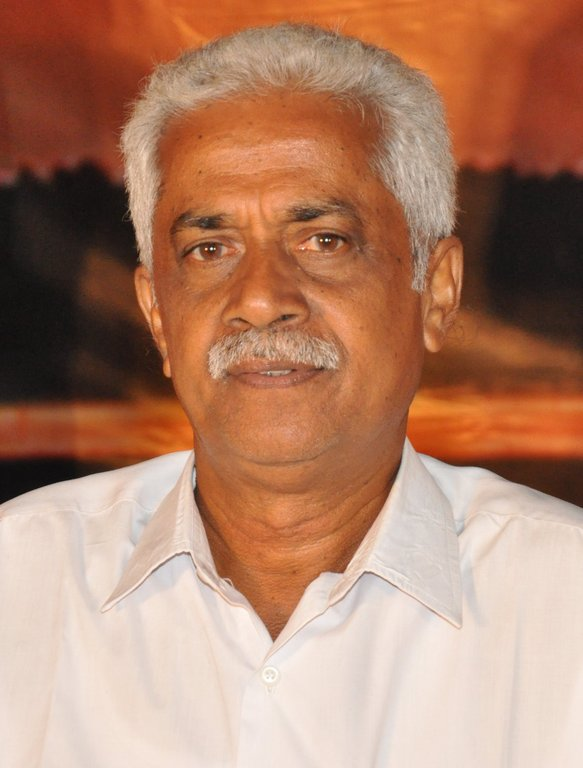

Member of Parliament, Lok Sabha
- In office 10 October 1999 – 16 May 2009
- Preceded by: N. K. Premachandran
- Succeeded by: N. Peethambara Kurup
- Constituency: Kollam

Personal details
- Born: 28 August 1949 (age 75); Kollam, United State of Travancore–Cochin, Dominion of India (present day Kerala, India)
- Political party: Communist Party of India (Marxist)
- Spouse: A. Vijayalakshmi Amma
- Children: 2
- As of 23 September, 2006

P. Rajendran (Malayalam: പി. രാജേന്ദ്രൻ) (born 28 August 1949) is an Indian politician who is a member of the Communist Party of India (Marxist). He was a member of the 13th as well as 14th Lok Sabha of India. He represented the Kollam Lok Sabha constituency in Kerala. He is a member of the Central Control Commission and Kerala State Committee of the CPI(M).
