= Dakshayani Velayudhan =

Indian politician

Members of the Constituent Assembly
- In office November 1946 – 25 January 1950

Personal details
- Born: July 4, 1912 Mulavukad, Kingdom of Cochin, British Raj (present-day Eranakulam district, Kerala)
- Died: July 20, 1978 (aged 66)
- Spouse: R. Velayudhan
- Children: Dr. Reghu, Prahladan, Dhruvan, Bhagirath and Meera Velayudhan
- Parent: Kunjan (father)
- Education: Teachers' training course, Madras University
- Occupation: Social reformer, worked as an L2 teacher

Dakshayani Velayudhan (4 July 1912 – 20 July 1978) was an Indian politician and leader of the oppressed classes. Belonging to the Pulayar community, she was among the first generation of people to be educated from the community. She holds several distinctions including becoming the first woman from her community to wear an upper cloth, the first Scheduled Caste woman graduate in India, a science graduate, a member of the Cochin Legislative Council and of being one of nine female members of the Constituent Assembly of India. But it is not correct to mention that she was one of the first women from her community to wear an upper cloth. Her elder sister and her mother Thayyithara Maani may be given this credit prior to her. Her mother Maani lived up to the post independent period in India and died in 1959.

Honouring Dakshayani Velayudhan, the first and only Dalit woman MLA, the Kerala government has constituted the ‘Dakshayani Velayudhan Award’ for women who have contributed to empowering other women in the state. The budget earmarked Rs 2 crore for the award. This was announced by the Kerala Finance Minister Dr. Thomas Isaac during the presentation of Kerala Budget 2019 in the Legislative Assembly on 31 January 2019.

== Early life and education ==
Dakshayani was born in the Mulavukad village of the present-day Kanayannur taluka of Ernakulam district in July 4, 1912. She completed her B.A. in 1935 and went on to complete her TTC (D.Ed) from the Madras University three years later. Her studies were supported by scholarships from the government of the Cochin State. From 1935 to 1945, she worked as a teacher at the Government High Schools in Trichur and Tripunithura.

== Family ==
Dakshayani was the daughter of Kallachammuri Kunjhan and his wife Maani (Thayyithara Maaniyamma from Elankunnappuzha of Vypin island). As the house-name of Dakshayani was Kallachammuri, her maiden name was Kallachammuri Kunjhan Dakshayani (KKDakshayani). She belonged to the Pulaya community, just like her contemporary social worker Vallon K. P. Vallon. Her younger brother K. K. Madhavan was also active in politics and was elected to the Rajya sabha in 1976. She married R. Velayudhan a SC leader and later MP. Their wedding was held at Sevagram in Wardha with Gandhi and Kasturba as witnesses and a leper standing in as the priest. The couple had five children Dr. Reghu (previously doctor for Smt. Indira Gandhi), Prahladan, Dhruvan, Bhagirath [Secretary General, The Indian Ocean Rim Association (IORA)] and Meera. She was also related to K R Narayanan who later became the President of India.

== Parliamentary career ==
In 1945, Dakshayani was nominated to the Cochin Legislative Council by the government of the State.

=== Participation in the Constituent Assembly ===
Velayudhan was elected to the Constituent Assembly of India by the Council in 1946. She was the first and only Scheduled Caste woman to be elected to the constituent assembly. From 1946-1952 she served as a member of the Constituent Assembly and the Provisional Parliament of India. In Parliament she took special interest in the matters of education especially that of the Scheduled Castes.

==== Interventions in the Constituent Assembly ====
Although a staunch Gandhian, Dakshayani sided with B R Ambedkar on many issues relating to the Scheduled Castes during the Constituent Assembly debates. She agreed with Ambedkar giving up the demand for separate electorates arguing instead for 'moral safeguards' and the immediate removal of their social disabilities.

On 8 November 1948, after Dr B. R. Ambedkar introduced the draft Constitution for discussion, she expressed her appreciation for the draft while calling for greater decentralisation. She also suggested that the final draft of the Constitution should be adopted following a ratification through a general election.

She intervened again on 29 November 1948, during discussions on draft Article 11, which aimed at prohibiting discrimination on the basis of caste, and was permitted to exceed the time limit by the Vice President of the Constituent Assembly who said, "It is only because you are a lady I am allowing you." Velayudhan called for implementation of non-discrimination provisions through public education and pointed out that it would send a great public signal if the Constituent Assembly were to endorse a resolution condemning caste discrimination. "The working of the Constitution," she said, "will depend on how people conduct themselves in the future, not on the actual execution of the law."

She also contested the general elections of 1971 from the Adoor Lok Sabha constituency but ended up fourth in a fray of five candidates.

== Later life and death ==
Dakshayani was president of the Depressed Classes Youths Fine arts Club and the Managing Editor of The Common Man in Madras from 1946-49. She later became the founder president of the Mahila Jagriti Parishad. Dakshayani died after a short illness in July 1978. She was 66. Her life has been documented in a detailed biography, Kaala Shasanakalkku Keezhadungatha Dakshayani Velayudhan (Dakshayani Velayudhan, who refused to succumb to the dictates of the times), written by Cherai Ramadas.
