= Kollam Lok Sabha constituency =

Constituency of the Indian parliament in Kerala

Coordinates: 8.89°N 76.61°E

Kollam KL-18
- Lok Sabha constituency
- Kollam Lok Sabha constituency

Constituency details
- Country: India
- Region: South India
- State: Kerala
- Assembly constituencies: Chavara; Punalur; Chadayamangalam; Kundara; Kollam; Eravipuram; Chathannoor
- Established: 1952
- Reservation: None

Member of Parliament
- 18th Lok Sabha
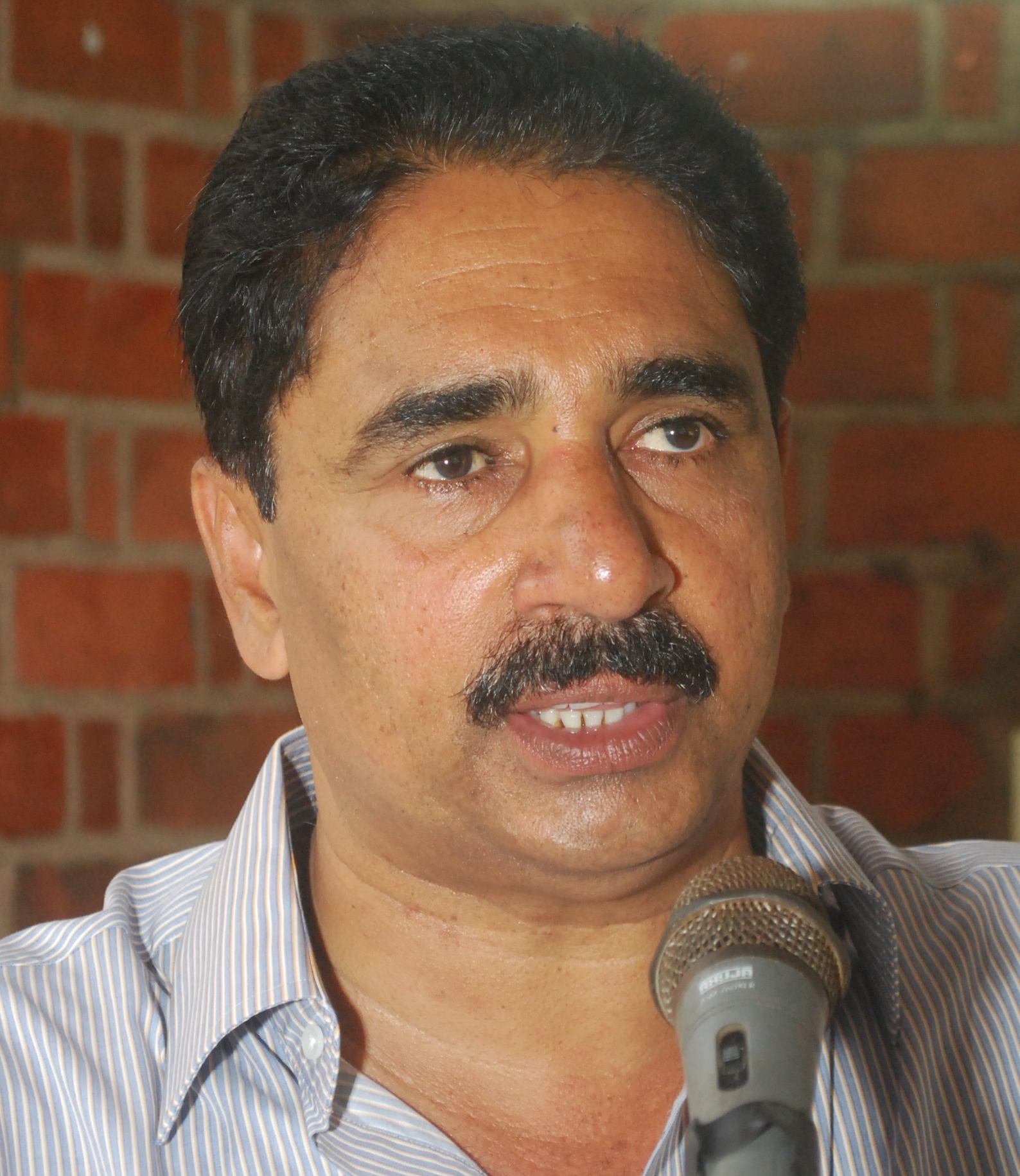
- Incumbent N. K. Premachandran
- Party: RSP
- Alliance: UDF
- Elected year: 2024
- Preceded by: N. Peethambara Kurup

Kollam Lok Sabha constituency formerly Quilon Lok Sabha constituency is one of the 20 Lok Sabha constituencies in Kerala state in southern India.

== Assembly segments ==
Kollam Lok Sabha constituency is composed of the following assembly segments:

No	Name	District	Member	Party	2024 Lead
117	Chavara	Kollam	Shibu Baby John	RSP	RSP
121	Punalur	Kollam	C. Ajayaprasad	CPI	RSP
122	Chadayamangalam	Kollam	M. M. Naseer	INC	RSP
123	Kundara	Kollam	P. C. Vishnunath	INC	RSP
124	Kollam	Kollam	Bindu Krishna	INC	RSP
125	Eravipuram	Kollam	Vishnu Mohan	RSP	RSP
126	Chathannoor	Kollam	B. B. Gopakumar	BJP	RSP

=== Corporations & municipalities coming under Kollam Lok Sabha constituency ===
- Kollam - Corporation
- Paravur - Municipality
- Punalur - Municipality

== Members of Parliament ==
Year	Member	Party
As Quilon Cum Mavelikkara in Travancore–Cochin
1952	N. Sreekantan Nair	Revolutionary Socialist Party
1952	R. Velayudhan	Independent politician
As Quilon Lok Sabha constituency
1957	V. Parameswaran Nayar	Communist Party of India
1957	P. K. Kodiyan	Communist Party of India
1962	N. Sreekantan Nair	Revolutionary Socialist Party
1967	N. Sreekantan Nair	Revolutionary Socialist Party
1971	N. Sreekantan Nair	Revolutionary Socialist Party
1977	N. Sreekantan Nair	Revolutionary Socialist Party
1980	B. K. Nair	Indian National Congress
1984	S. Krishna Kumar	Indian National Congress
1989	S. Krishna Kumar	Indian National Congress
1991	S. Krishna Kumar	Indian National Congress
1996	N. K. Premachandran	Revolutionary Socialist Party
1998	N. K. Premachandran	Revolutionary Socialist Party
1999	P. Rajendran	Communist Party of India (Marxist)
2004	P. Rajendran	Communist Party of India (Marxist)
As Kollam Lok Sabha constituency
2009	N. Peethambara Kurup	Indian National Congress
2014	N. K. Premachandran	Revolutionary Socialist Party
2019	N. K. Premachandran	Revolutionary Socialist Party
2024	N. K. Premachandran	Revolutionary Socialist Party

== Election results ==
Vote share of Winning candidates
2024	48.80%
2019	51.57%
2014	46.46%
2009	47.52%
2004	50.36%
1999	47.84%
1998	52.11%
1996	49.78%
1991	50.40%
1989	50.18%
1984	49.77%
1980	53.23%
1977	60.86%
1971	66.11%
1967	57.68%
1962	59.73%
1957	24.68%
1957	22.46%
1952	21.42%
1952	18.87%

=== General Elections 2029 ===
2029 Indian general election: Kollam
Party	Candidate	Votes	%	±%
UDF				
LDF				
NDA				
NOTA	None of the above			
Margin of victory				
Turnout				
		Swing		

=== 2024 ===
2024 Indian general election: Kollam
Party	Candidate	Votes	%	±%
RSP	N. K. Premachandran	443,628	48.80	▼2.77
CPI(M)	M. Mukesh	293,326	32.26	▼3.94
BJP	G. Krishnakumar	163,210	17.95	▲7.29
NOTA	None of the Above	6,546	0.72	▲0.10
BSP	Vipinlal Vidhyadharan	2,194	0.24	
IND	Premachandran Nair	1,734	0.19	
IND	Gokulam Suresh Kumar	1,374	0.15	
IND	Bro Noushad Sheriff J.	579	0.06	
IND	N. Jayarajan	449	0.05	
Majority		150,302	16.54	▲1.17
Turnout		915,691	68.80	▼5.86
RSP hold		Swing		

By Assembly Segments (2024)

No.	Constituency	Party	Lead
117	Chavara	RSP	25,846
121	Punalur	RSP	18,044
122	Chadayamangalam	RSP	14,619
123	Kundara	RSP	27,105
124	Kollam	RSP	23,792
125	Eravipuram	RSP	23,678
126	Chathannoor	RSP	15,571

=== 2019 ===
2019 Indian general election: Kollam
Party	Candidate	Votes	%	±%
RSP	N. K. Premachandran	499,677	51.57	▲5.11
CPI(M)	K. N. Balagopal	350,821	36.20	▼5.98
BJP	Adv. K. V. Sabu	103,339	10.66	▲3.99
NOTA	None of the Above	6,018	0.62	▼0.28
IND	Saji Kollam	2,629	0.27	
IND	Suni Kalluvathukkal	1,708	0.18	
SUCI(C)	Twinkle Prabhakaran	1,319	0.14	
IND	Dr. Sreekumar J.	1,150	0.12	
IND	N. Jayarajan	830	0.09	
IND	Nagaraj G.	632	0.07	
Majority		148,856	15.37	▲11.09
Turnout		968,123	74.66	▲2.56
RSP hold		Swing		

By Assembly Segments (2019)

No.	Constituency	Party	Lead
117	Chavara	RSP	27,568
121	Punalur	RSP	18,666
122	Chadayamangalam	RSP	14,232
123	Kundara	RSP	24,309
124	Kollam	RSP	24,545
125	Eravipuram	RSP	23,420
126	Chathannoor	RSP	17,032

=== 2014 ===
2014 Indian general election: Kollam
Party	Candidate	Votes	%	±%
RSP	N. K. Premachandran	408,528	46.46	
CPI(M)	M. A. Baby	370,879	42.18	▼3.01
BJP	P. M. Velayudhan	58,671	6.67	▲2.27
SDPI	A. K. Salahudeen	12,812	1.46	
NOTA	None of the Above	7,876	0.90	
BSP	Adv. S. Prahladan	4,266	0.49	▼0.41
IND	M. Baby	3,364	0.38	
IND	V. S. Premachandran	3,333	0.38	
IND	K. Bhaskaran	3,108	0.35	
IND	R. Premachandran	2,808	0.32	
IND	C. Indulal	1,709	0.19	
IND	A. Josekutty	1,702	0.19	
Majority		37,649	4.28	▲1.95
Turnout		879,056	72.10	▲4.26
RSP gain from INC		Swing		

By Assembly Segments (2014)

No.	Constituency	Party	Lead
117	Chavara	RSP	24,441
121	Punalur	CPI(M)	4,640
122	Chadayamangalam	CPI(M)	6,806
123	Kundara	RSP	6,911
124	Kollam	RSP	14,242
125	Eravipuram	RSP	6,564
126	Chathannoor	CPI(M)	3,034

=== 2009 ===
2009 Indian general election: Kollam
Party	Candidate	Votes	%	±%
INC	N. Peethambara Kurup	357,401	47.52	▲12.90
CPI(M)	P. Rajendran	339,870	45.19	▼5.17
BJP	Vayakkal Madhu	33,078	4.40	▼4.41
BSP	Advt. K. M. Jayanandan	6,752	0.90	▲0.02
IND	N. Peethambara Kurup	4,553	0.61	
IND	R. Zakieer Hussain	3,093	0.41	
IND	Adv. Anu Sasi	2,357	0.31	
IND	S. Radhakrishnan	2,083	0.28	
IND	Krishnammal	1,079	0.14	
IND	K. A. John	1,066	0.14	
IND	S. Pradeep Kumar	789	0.10	
Majority		17,531	2.33	▼13.41
Turnout		752,121	67.84	▼0.49
INC gain from CPI(M)		Swing		

By Assembly Segments (2009)

No.	Constituency	Party	Lead
117	Chavara	INC	14,002
121	Punalur	CPI(M)	372
122	Chadayamangalam	CPI(M)	6,561
123	Kundara	INC	830
124	Kollam	INC	10,625
125	Eravipuram	INC	808
126	Chathannoor	CPI(M)	1,075

=== 2004 ===
2004 Indian general election: Quilon
Party	Candidate	Votes	%	±%
CPI(M)	P. Rajendran	355,279	50.36	▲2.52
INC	Sooranad Rajasekharan	244,208	34.62	▼10.60
BJP	Adv. Kizhakkanela Sudhakaran	62,183	8.81	
IND	Kolloorvila Nasimudeen	26,423	3.75	
BSP	Adv. S. Prahaladan	6,232	0.88	
IND	K. P. Viswavalsalan	4,919	0.70	
IND	Shyla K. John	3,378	0.48	
IND	Sivaprasad Raghavan	1,603	0.23	
IND	K. R. Meena	1,257	0.18	
Majority		111,071	15.74	▲13.12
Turnout		705,482	68.33	▲0.27
CPI(M) hold		Swing		

By Assembly Segments (2004)

No.	Constituency	Party	Lead
120	Kunnathur	CPI(M)	13,162
121	Karunagappally	CPI(M)	11,586
122	Chavara	CPI(M)	9,239
123	Kundara	CPI(M)	15,323
124	Kollam	CPI(M)	10,097
125	Eravipuram	CPI(M)	29,058
126	Chathannoor	CPI(M)	21,318

=== 1999 ===
1999 Indian general election: Quilon
Party	Candidate	Votes	%	±%
CPI(M)	P. Rajendran	351,869	47.84	
INC	M. P. Gangadharan	332,585	45.22	▲2.55
JD(U)	Prof. Jayalekshmi	42,579	5.79	
IND	Aroor Asokan	2,490	0.34	
IND	V. Sahadevan Pillai	1,853	0.25	
IND	Shyla K. John	1,449	0.20	
IND	K. Kanakarajan	1,258	0.17	
IND	Muhammed Kunju	941	0.13	
IND	D. Sudhadevi Amma	533	0.07	
Majority		19,284	2.62	▼6.82
Turnout		740,869	68.06	▼4.01
CPI(M) gain from RSP		Swing		

=== 1998 ===
1998 Indian general election: Quilon
Party	Candidate	Votes	%	±%
RSP	N. K. Premachandran	396,145	52.11	▲2.33
INC	K. C. Rajan	324,383	42.67	▲3.73
BJP	Dr. Raichel Matthai	36,916	4.86	
IND	B. K. Rajagopal	860	0.11	
IND	K. Kanakarajan	783	0.10	
IND	V. Chandrabhanu	687	0.09	
IND	Latheef Kallumpuram	459	0.06	
Majority		71,762	9.44	▼1.40
Turnout		765,190	72.07	▼0.14
RSP hold		Swing		

=== 1996 ===
1996 Indian general election: Quilon
Party	Candidate	Votes	%	±%
RSP	N. K. Premachandran	359,786	49.78	▲3.15
INC	S. Krishna Kumar	281,416	38.94	▼11.46
IND	Nina Rajan Pillai	57,917	8.01	
AIFB	Kaippuzha Ram Mohan	12,837	1.78	
IND	Y. Abdul Azeez	3,533	0.49	
IND	V. Sahadevan Pillai	1,695	0.23	
IND	K. Jagadan	1,290	0.18	
IND	Keralapuram Jabbar	1,131	0.16	
IND	K. Kanakarajan	1,104	0.15	
IND	B. K. Rajagopal	1,091	0.15	
JP	Sankaramangalam Jayasankar	894	0.12	
Majority		78,370	10.84	▲7.07
Turnout		738,078	72.21	▼3.49
RSP gain from INC		Swing		

=== 1991 ===
1991 Indian general election: Quilon
Party	Candidate	Votes	%	±%
INC	S. Krishna Kumar	370,523	50.40	▲0.22
RSP	R. S. Unni	342,796	46.63	▲0.01
BJP	S. Ramakrishna Pillai	16,507	2.25	▲0.15
IND	B. K. Rajagopal	1,497	0.20	
IND	Aboobaker Kunju	1,243	0.17	
LKD	Parakondu Sreeni	1,074	0.15	
IND	P. Gopinathan Nair	929	0.13	
IND	Prafullakumar Bhanu	650	0.09	
Majority		27,727	3.77	▲0.21
Turnout		741,389	75.70	▼5.72
INC hold		Swing		

=== 1989 ===
1989 Indian general election: Quilon
Party	Candidate	Votes	%	±%
INC	S. Krishna Kumar	386,855	50.18	▲0.41
RSP	Babu Divakaran	359,393	46.62	
BJP	P. K. S. Rajeev	16,202	2.10	
IND	S. Sirajudeen	2,267	0.29	
IND	C. K. Lukose	2,159	0.28	
JP	N. Vidhyadharan	1,333	0.17	
IND	Divakaran	1,137	0.15	
IND	R. Krishnankutty Pillai	1,036	0.13	
IND	James George	516	0.07	
Majority		27,462	3.56	▼0.06
Turnout		775,045	81.42	▲3.43
INC hold		Swing		

=== 1984 ===
1984 Indian general election: Quilon
Party	Candidate	Votes	%	±%
INC	S. Krishna Kumar	279,728	49.77	▼3.46
IND	R. S. Unni	259,371	46.14	
IND	C. Rajendran	14,358	2.55	
IND	James Joseph	3,194	0.57	
IND	P. G. Elias	1,954	0.35	
IND	Manakkad Najimuddin	1,401	0.25	
IND	Suvarna Kumar	1,221	0.22	
IND	Mohanan Pillai	859	0.15	
Majority		20,357	3.62	▼5.15
Turnout		566,439	77.99	▲14.38
INC hold		Swing		

=== 1980 ===
1980 Indian general election: Quilon
Party	Candidate	Votes	%	±%
INC(I)	B. K. Nair	222,148	53.23	
RSP	N. Sreekantan Nair	185,562	44.46	▼16.40
SUCI(C)	James Joseph	9,647	2.31	▲0.45
Majority		36,586	8.77	▼16.51
Turnout		420,586	63.61	▼15.06
INC(I) gain from RSP		Swing		

=== 1977 ===
1977 Indian general election: Quilon
Party	Candidate	Votes	%	±%
RSP	N. Sreekantan Nair	272,378	60.86	▼5.25
IND	N. Rajagopalan	159,217	35.58	
SUCI(C)	James Joseph	8,305	1.86	
IND	C. N. Chellamma Krishnan	5,639	1.26	
IND	Sekhar	2,003	0.45	
Majority		113,161	25.28	▼10.73
Turnout		458,425	78.67	▲20.67
RSP hold		Swing		

=== 1971 ===
1971 Indian general election: Quilon
Party	Candidate	Votes	%	±%
RSP	N. Sreekantan Nair	206,309	66.11	
IND	G. Janardhana Kurup	93,925	30.10	
IND	K. C. Dominic	11,844	3.80	
Majority		112,384	36.01	▲13.79
Turnout		314,953	58.00	▼22.85
RSP gain from Independent		Swing		

=== 1967 ===
1967 Indian general election: Quilon
Party	Candidate	Votes	%	±%
IND	N. Sreekantan Nair	207,338	57.68	
INC	A. A. Rahim	127,480	35.46	▼4.81
KEC	K. C. T. Pillai	24,666	6.86	
Majority		79,858	22.22	▲2.76
Turnout		371,498	80.85	▲4.09
Independent gain from RSP		Swing		

=== 1962 ===
1962 Indian general election: Quilon
Party	Candidate	Votes	%	±%
RSP	N. Sreekantan Nair	199,377	59.73	
INC	Sarojani	134,422	40.27	
Majority		64,955	19.46	
Turnout		339,363	76.76	
RSP win (new seat)				

=== 1957 ===
1957 Indian general election: Quilon (2 seats)
Party	Candidate	Votes	%	±%
CPI	P. K. Kodiyan	297,041	24.68	
CPI	V. Parameswaran Nayar	270,306	22.46	
INC	Ramachandra Das	201,454	16.74	
RSP	Chandrasekharan	171,946	14.28	
INC	Velayudhan Nair	161,913	13.45	
RSP	N. Sreekantan Nair	101,094	8.40	
Turnout		1,203,754	75.09	

=== 1952 ===
1951–52 Indian general election: Quilon cum Mavelikara (2 seats)
Party	Candidate	Votes	%	±%
RSP	N. Sreekantan Nair	220,312	21.42	
IND	R. Velayudhan	194,089	18.87	
INC	Kunju Kunju	166,935	16.23	
INC	Kainikara N. Padmanabha Pillai	132,614	12.90	
IND	Mathew	122,961	11.96	
Socialist	V. Gangadharan	90,367	8.79	
Socialist	Vivekanandan	59,289	5.77	
IND	Joseph	41,824	4.07	
Turnout		1,028,391	72.87	

== See also ==
- Kollam district
- List of constituencies of the Lok Sabha
- Indian general election, 2014 (Kerala)
- 2014 Indian general election
