= Shibu Baby John =

Indian politician

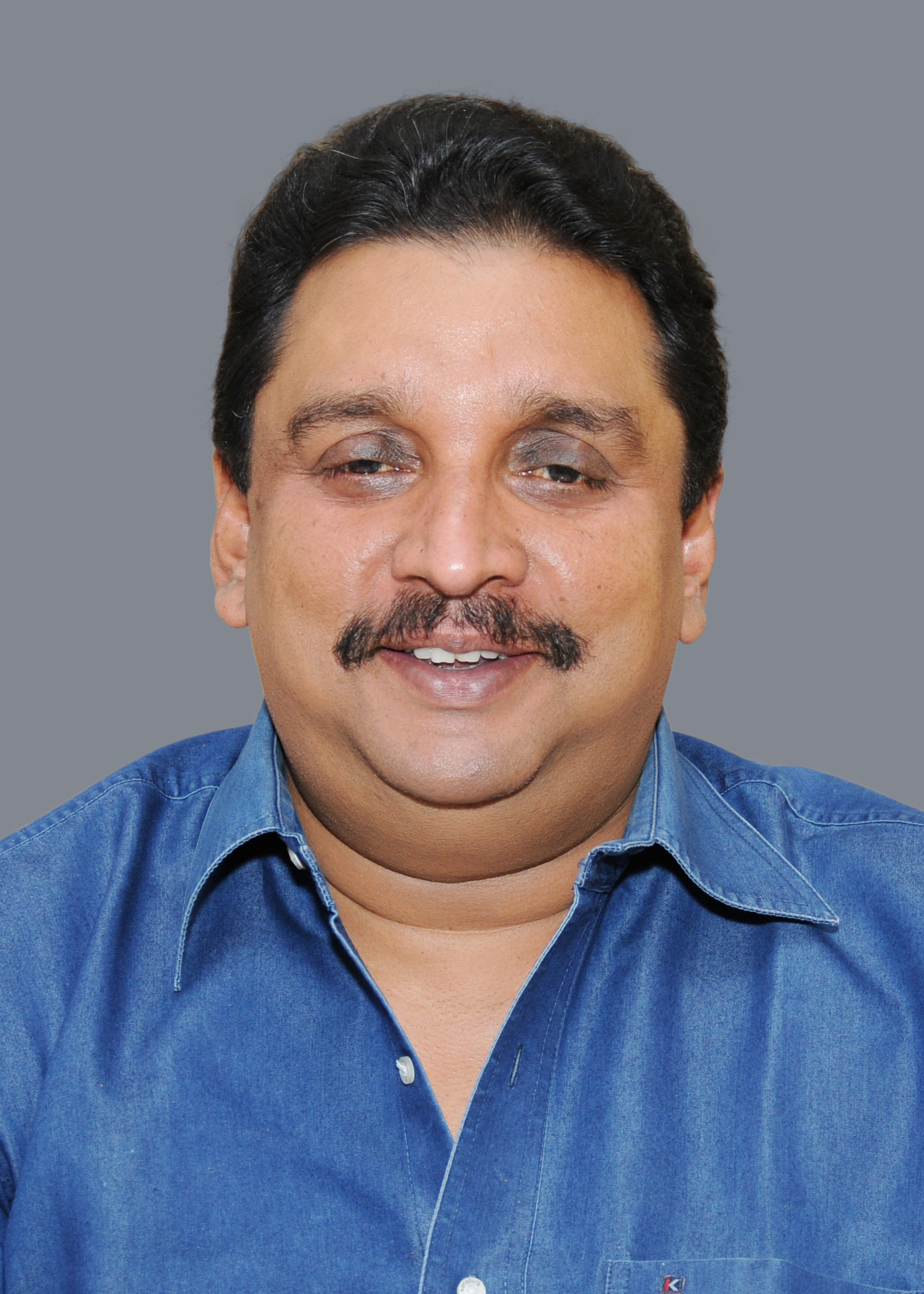

Minister for Forests, Wildlife Protection and Skill Development, Government of Kerala
- Incumbent
- Assumed office 18 May 2026
- Governor: Rajendra Arlekar
- Chief Minister: V. D. Satheesan
- Portfolio(s): See list: Forest & Wildlife Protection; Skill Development; Kerala Academy for Skills Excellence (KASE); Employment and Training; Kerala Institute of Labour and Employment; Cashew Industry
- Preceded by: A. K. Saseendran (Forests); V. Sivankutty (Skill Development)

Minister for Labour and Employment, Government of Kerala
- In office 18 May 2011 – 20 May 2016
- Chief Minister: Oommen Chandy
- Preceded by: P. K. Gurudasan
- Succeeded by: T. P. Ramakrishnan

State Secretary of the Revolutionary Socialist Party, Kerala State Committee
- Incumbent
- Assumed office 21 February 2023
- Preceded by: A. A. Aziz

Member of the Kerala Legislative Assembly
- Incumbent
- Assumed office 4 May 2026
- Preceded by: Sujith Vijayanpillai
- Constituency: Chavara
- In office 13 May 2011 – 19 May 2016
- Preceded by: N. K. Premachandran
- Succeeded by: N. Vijayan Pillai
- Constituency: Chavara
- In office 13 May 2001 – 11 May 2006
- Preceded by: Baby John
- Succeeded by: N. K. Premachandran
- Constituency: Chavara

Personal details
- Born: 27 July 1963 (age 63) Kollam, Kerala, India
- Party: Revolutionary Socialist Party
- Spouse: Annie Constantine (m. 1988)
- Children: 2
- Parents: Baby John; Annamma Baby John
- Education: TKM College of Engineering, Kollam
- Occupation: Politician; Businessman; Film producer

Shibu Baby John (born 27 July 1963) is an Indian politician, businessman and film producer who is currently serving as the Minister for Forests, Wildlife Protection and Skill Development (KASE) in the Government of Kerala. He represents the Chavara Assembly constituency in the Kerala Legislative Assembly and is a senior leader of the Revolutionary Socialist Party (RSP).

He previously served as the General Secretary of the Revolutionary Socialist Party (Baby John), a Kerala-based faction formed after a split in the RSP. Following the merger of RSP (Baby John) with the parent party, he became a member of the national committee of the RSP. On 21 February 2023, he was elected Secretary of the RSP Kerala State Committee.

He is the son of former RSP leader Baby John and Annamma John.

== Personal life ==
Shibu Baby John married Annie Constantine, a civil engineering graduate from TKM College of Engineering, Kollam, on 17 January 1988 and the couple have two children. He graduated with a B.Tech. from TKM College of Engineering, Kollam. After studies he ventured into the export business.

== Political career ==
In the 2001 Assembly election, he contested from Chavara constituency on the Revolutionary Socialist Party ticket and won. Chavara constituency is known for having supported Baby John for decades. He left the RSP and launched the Revolutionary Socialist Party (Baby John) in 2005. In the 2006 Assembly election, he lost to N. K. Premachandran of the RSP.

In the 2011 assembly election, he defeated then state minister N. K. Premachandran with a lead of 6,061 votes in the Chavara constituency, and was sworn in as a minister on 23 May 2011. However in 2014, both leaders merged their parties together, and this allowed Premachandran to join UDF and to pay way to Lok Sabha in the elections which soon followed. In 2016, he was defeated by N. Vijayan Pillai of Communist Marxist Party (Aravindakshan) who is former panchayath member and district panchayath member of Chavara and son of veteran RSP leader N. Narayana Pillai.

== Film career ==
He produced 2024 Malayalam film Malaikottai Vaaliban directed by Lijo Jose Pellissery starring Mohanlal in titular role. The film was a Box office failure. He is now producing upcoming Mohanlal film directed by Dileesh Pothan.
