= Sreeni Pattathanam =

Indian writer (born 1956)

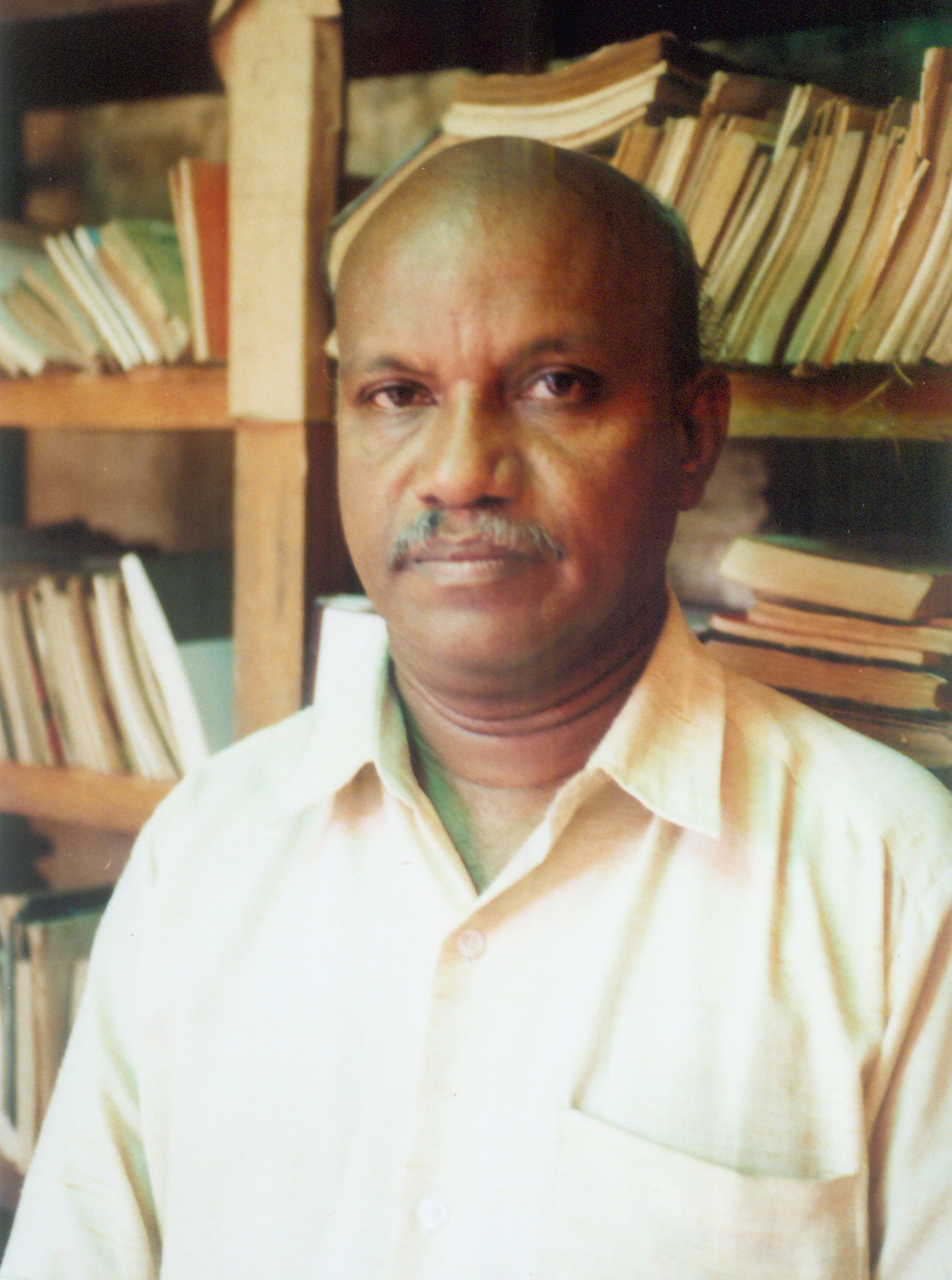
- Born: 10 June 1956 (age 70); Pattathanam, Kollam, Kerala, India
- Occupations: Journalist, activist, publisher
- Years active: 1974–present
- Website: bharatheeyayukthivadisangham.com

Sreeni Pattathanam (born 10 June 1956) is a rationalist, activist, and writer from Kerala, India. He was born in the Pattathanam area of Kollam City in the Indian state of Kerala. Pattathanam was the editor of Ranarekha, a monthly in Malayalam, which ceased publication in the 1980s. He started publishing another monthly in Malayalam called Yukthirajyam. This journal is the official journal of the organization, Bharatheeya Yukthivadi Sangham (Rationalist Association of India). He was also the secretary of the Kerala state branch of Indian Rationalist Association. Pattathanam later left IRA and started, with like-minded people, another rationalist association, Bharathiya Yukthivadi Sangham. He is the vice-chairman of the National Level Rationalist Organization, RAI, Rationalist Association of India that was established in 1930. RAI is one of the founding members of the International Humanist and Ethical Union (IHEU), based in London. www.iheu.org

== On Mata Amritanandamayi ==
Sreeni Pattathanam authored a book, Matha Amritanandamayi: Divya Kathakalum Yatharthyavum (lit. 'Matha Amritanandamayi: Sacred Stories and Realities'), which became controversial for the alleged derogatory remarks by the author about Matha Amritanandamayi.

The book contains critical comments about Mata Amritanandamayi, Mata's personal life, and sexual behaviour. The book also has references to court records, newspaper reports and quotations from some literary figures, and attempts to refute the Matha's claims to miracles and contends that there have been many suspicious deaths in and around her ashram, which he says need police investigation.

Some of deaths which the author alleges as murders are:

1. The suicide of Subhagan alias Sunilkumar, brother of Amrithananda Mayi. The author alleges that Subhagan was beaten to death for opposing the activities of his sister.
2. Vellappillil Narayanan Kutty of Kodungallur, an inmate of the Amrithanandamayi Ashram, died on 4 April 1990, due to internal hemorrhage as per postmortem report. He was an employee of Government Bureau of Economics and Statistics, Trichur, Kerala. (The New Indian Express, 19 April 1990, Kochi, Kerala, India and Janayugam a Malayalam daily 22 April 1990).
3. Pradeep Kumar, a relative of Amrithananda Mayi, died on 16 August 1994 under mysterious circumstances.
4. Rumdhur, a historian and inmate of the ashram, died on 15 July 2000 within the precincts of the ashram. The ashram authorities did not intimate his death to his friends or his relatives.
5. Ramanatha Iyer of Mumbai allegedly committed suicide by jumping from the 12th floor of Amrithanandamayi Math at Vallikkavu on 5 September 2001. (The New Indian Express, 6 September 2001, Kochi, Kerala)

Advocate Ajan, a devotee of Mata Amrithanandamayi, found these allegations objectionable and asked Kerala government to prosecute the author for the derogatory and defamatory contents in the book. Despite pressure from the math and devotees, Kerala government refused to prosecute the author, but allowed the devotee to file a case for prosecution (government permission is required to move private prosecution in similar cases). There were public protests by international humanists, Indian rationalists, writers, and the youth wing of the Indian Communist Party (Marxist) in which the author was an activist, which yielded results.

However, in 2004, the Kerala State Government sanctioned criminal prosecution of Patthathanam, the owner of the publishing company, and the printer of the book on grounds that religious sentiments had been offended and for the libelous statements in the book. The order followed directions from the Kerala High Court to the Home Department for considering an application by T.K. Ajan, a resident of the Mata Amṛtānandamayī Math. CPI leader Thengamam Balakrishnan protested the move against Pattathanam.
