= Revolutionary Socialist Party of India (Marxist) =

- Secretary: Babu Divakaran
- Founded: 2005
- Dissolved: 2011
- Split from: Revolutionary Socialist Party of Kerala (Bolshevik)
- Merged into: Revolutionary Socialist Party
- Alliance: United Democratic Front

Revolutionary Socialist Party of India (Marxist) was a political party in Kerala, India. It was formed by the former Labour Minister of Kerala, Babu Divakaran in 2005. Divakaran broke away from the RSP(B). In 2008 the party merged with the SP. In 2011, Babu Divakaran quit SP and subsequently RSP(M) merged with RSP.

== See also ==
- Communism in Kerala
- Communism in India
- Revolutionary Socialist Party
- Revolutionary Socialist Party of Kerala(Bolshevik)
- Kerala Revolutionary Socialist Party (Baby John)
