= Babu Divakaran =

Indian politician

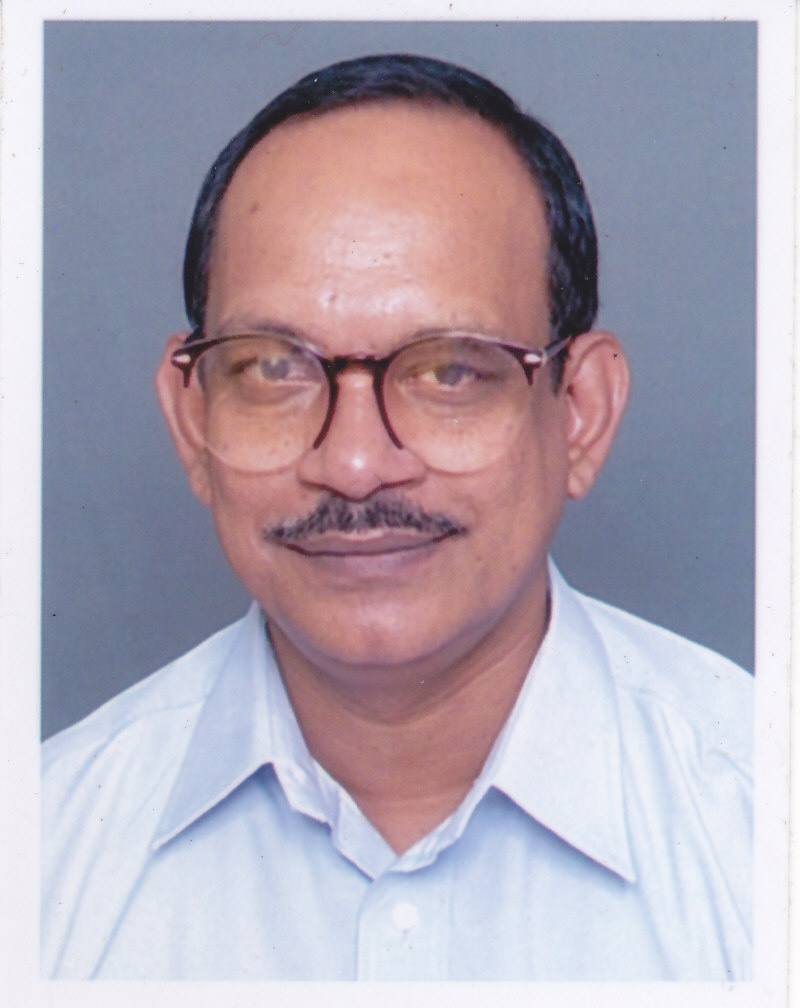
Babu Divakaran Ex.MLA

Babu Divakaran is an Indian politician and a former Minister from the state of Kerala. He started his political career in the Revolutionary Socialist Party. When the RSP split, he joined the Revolutionary Socialist Party (Bolshevik) along with Baby John, Shibu Baby John, and A.V. Thamarakshan. When the RSP (B) split in 2005, he formed the Revolutionary Socialist Party (Marxist). He is the son of T. K. Divakaran, a veteran RSP leader and former minister of Kerala state.
