= Dakshayani Velayudhan Award =

Annual award conferred by the state of Kerala, India

- Award for those working for women empowerment Instituted in 2019
- Awarded for: Women Empowerment award in Kerala
- Sponsored by: Government of Kerala

The Dakshayani Velayudhan Award is an annual award in the name of Dakshayani Velayudhan, the first and lone Dalit woman in the Constituent Assembly of India. Instituted in 2019, the award is bestowed on women who contribute in empowering other women in the state of Kerala.

The Dakshayani Velayudhan Award was announced by the Kerala Finance Minister Dr. Thomas Isaac during the presentation of Kerala Budget 2019 in the Legislative Assembly on 31 January 2019. The budget earmarked Rs 2 crore for the award.
