= R. Velayudhan =

Indian politician (born 1911

Member of Parliament for Quilon Cum Mavelikkara
- In office 1952–1957
- Preceded by: Inaugural Holder
- Succeeded by: M.K. Kumaran

Personal details
- Born: 23 March 1911
- Spouse: Dakshayani Velayudhan
- Children: 4 sons and 1 daughter
- Parent: Raman Kelan (father)

Raman Kelan Velayudhan (born 23 March 1911, date of death unknown) was an Indian politician from Kerala who served as a member of Lok Sabha, representing Quilon Cum Mavelikkara Lok Sabha constituency.

== Early life ==
R. Velayudhan was born on 23 March 1911. He was educated at Middle School Uzhavoor, High School Kuravilangad, C.M.S. College Kottayam and Arts College Trivandrum and also at Tata Institute of Social Sciences, Mumbai.

== Career ==
Velayudhan was known for his contributions as a political worker and journalist. Before he was a research scholar at All India Harijan Sevak Sangh. He served as labour welfare officer at Tata Oil Mills, from 1941 to 1945 later as information officer at Government of India between 1945 and 1948. He was a well accepted social worker especially among scheduled castes of many years standing, also interested in amelioration of proletariat classes.

== Personal life ==
Velayudhan married Dakshayani Velayudhan in September 1941. Their wedding was held at Sevagram in Wardha with Gandhi and Kasturba as witnesses and a leper standing in as the priest. The couple had five children Dr. Reghu (previously doctor for Smt. Indira Gandhi), Prahladan, Dhruvan, Bhagirath [Secretary General, The Indian Ocean Rim Association (IORA) and Meera.

R. Velayudhan is deceased.
