= Kerala Revolutionary Socialist Party (Baby John) =

- Leader: Shibu Baby John
- Founder: Baby John
- Founded: 2005
- Dissolved: 2014
- Split from: Revolutionary Socialist Party of Kerala (Bolshevik)
- Merged into: Revolutionary Socialist Party
- Alliance: United Democratic Front

Kerala Revolutionary Socialist Party (Baby John) was a political party in Kerala, India, led by Shibu Baby John (the son of late Baby John, a former Minister in Kerala). RSP (Baby John) is part of the Indian National Congress-led United Democratic Front.

== See also ==
- Communism in Kerala
- Communism in India
- Revolutionary Socialist Party
- Revolutionary Socialist Party of Kerala (Bolshevik)
- Revolutionary Socialist Party of India (Marxist)
