= N. Sreekantan Nair =

Indian politician, independence activist, trade unionist, writer

Comrade N. Sreekantan Nair

Member of Parliament for Quilon Mavelikara (Lok Sabha constituency)
- In office 1952–1957

Member of Parliament for Quilon (Lok Sabha constituency)
- In office 1962–1980
- Preceded by: V. Parameswaran Nayar
- Succeeded by: B.K. Nair

Personal details
- Born: 15 July 1915 Ambalapuzha, Travancore
- Died: 20 July 1983 (aged 68) Quilon, Kerala, India
- Party: Revolutionary Socialist Party
- Spouse: K. MaheshwariAmma
- Children: 1
- Education: St Berchmans College Changanasserry, Maharajas College
- Website: www.nsreekantannair.com

N. Sreekantan Nair (15 July 1915 – 20 July 1983) was an Indian politician, independence activist, trade unionist and writer who served as a Member of Parliament for Kollam.

== Early life ==
He was born on 15 July 1915 as the only son of N. Neelakanta Pillai M.A. (Eng), (Mal), (Sanskrit). Pillai was a Principal of Government Sanskrit College, Trivandrum and authored several books in the three languages and JanakiAmma. He married activist Maheshwari Amma, daughter of freedom fighter K. K. Kunju Pillai. They have a daughter, Naja.

== Education ==
Nair passed his S.S.L.C. from M.G.M High School, Thiruvalla in 1932. He joined the St. Berchmans College, Changanassery where he completed his Intermediate in 1934. He passed his M.A. degree in English with first class from Maharajas College (now University College, Trivandrum) in 1937.

== Political life ==
He was a member of the State Congress in the erstwhile state of Travancore, and a founder of the Kerala Socialist Party which later merged into the Revolutionary Socialist Party. He was elected to the Lok Sabha for the first time in the General Elections of 1952 from Quilon cum Mavelikara constituency, but lost the 1957 elections to V. P. Nair. He won the next four elections (1962, 1967, 1971, 1977) representing Kollam Parliament Constituency. He devoted his political life to the trade union sector in Kerala.

== Writer ==
He translated the book 'Kayar'(Coir) of Jnanpith winner Thakazhi Sivasankara Pillai to English. He was a board member of the Sahithya Pravarthaka Saharkarna Sanghom and member of Kerala Sahitya Akademi.

=== Major works ===
- Ithuthanne Marxism
- Aikya Keralam
- Vanchikkapetta Venad
- Ente Amma
- My Mother (Translation of Ente Amma to English)
- Maotse Tung Vansi
- Kazhinjakala Chithrangal (3 volumes)
- Sahithya Salakangal

=== Translations ===
- Coir (English) (Translation of Kayar by Thakazhi Sivasankara Pillai)
- Chalo Delhi (Malayalam)(Translation of Road to Delhi by M.Sivaram)
