= Kerala Socialist Party =

Founded on 21 September 1947 in Kozhikode, the Kerala Socialist Party (KSP) is a political party in India established under the leadership of Mathai Manjooran. Initially a small entity, the KSP gained significant public attention due to the efforts of its front-line leaders. The party became part of the coalition that formed the first democratically elected communist government in the world after San Marino. Within its first two-and-a-half decades, the KSP significantly influenced the Kerala state's post-independence political landscape.

Some prominent leaders who co-founded the Kerala Socialist Party alongside Mathai Manjooran include John Manjooran, M.T. Lazar, N. Sreekantan Nair, M.P. Menon (later became a Judge at the High Court of Kerala), K. Balakrishnan (son of veteran Congress leader C. Kesavan), K.C.K.M. Mather, P. K. Balakrishnan, K.R. Chummar, G. Janardhana Kurup, T.P. Chakrapani, and A.P. Pillai.

In October 1949, just two years after its formation, the KSP experienced a split and members like N. Sreekantan Nair, Baby John, and K. Balakrishnan joined the Bengal-based Revolutionary Socialist Party.

The KSP joined six other parties to establish the United Front coalition government in Kerala, led by Chief Minister E.M.S. Namboodiripad from 1967 to 1969.

In the 1970 Kerala Legislative Assembly election, the KSP secured a single seat, competing as part of a new alliance spearheaded by the Communist Party of India (Marxist). This marked a shift from its earlier affiliation with the reconstituted United Front, known initially as the 'Mini Front,' which governed Kerala from 1970 to 1979.

== Other prominent leaders and members of the KSP ==
- Mamman Kannanthanam
- Cherian Manjooran
- Varkey Unnikkunnel
- Baby John
- M.L. George
- P. Sankarankutty
- S.S. Das
- K.G. Nath
- Karunakara Menon
- A. Damodaran
- C.N. Sreekandan Nair
- C.S. Gangadharan
- Prakkulam Bhasi
- Thakazhi Sivasankara Pillai
- C. Vivekanandan.
- Sadananda Shastri
- L.G. Pai
- T.K. Divakaran
- U. Neelakhandan

=== Important members and fellow travelers of the KSP ===
- Pozhamangalath George alias P P Varuthukutty (Secretary, Tata Employees Union)
- M.K. Menon (Vilasini)
- K. M. Ro

== Sources ==
- Kaalathinu Munpae Nadanna Manjooran by K.M. Roy
- Keraleeyathayum Mattum (Published by D.C. Books)_ by P. K. Balakrishnan.
- "CIA Confidential Report on the first communist win in the Indian States" (PDF). Central Intelligence Agency.
- "Vision of Kerala Socialist Party's TK Divakaran implemented after almost half a century". Deccan Chronicle. 16 January 2019.
- "When the 'Red Star Rose'". asianage.com. 6 April 2017.
