= N. K. Premachandran =

Indian politician (born 1960)

N. K. Premachandran MP
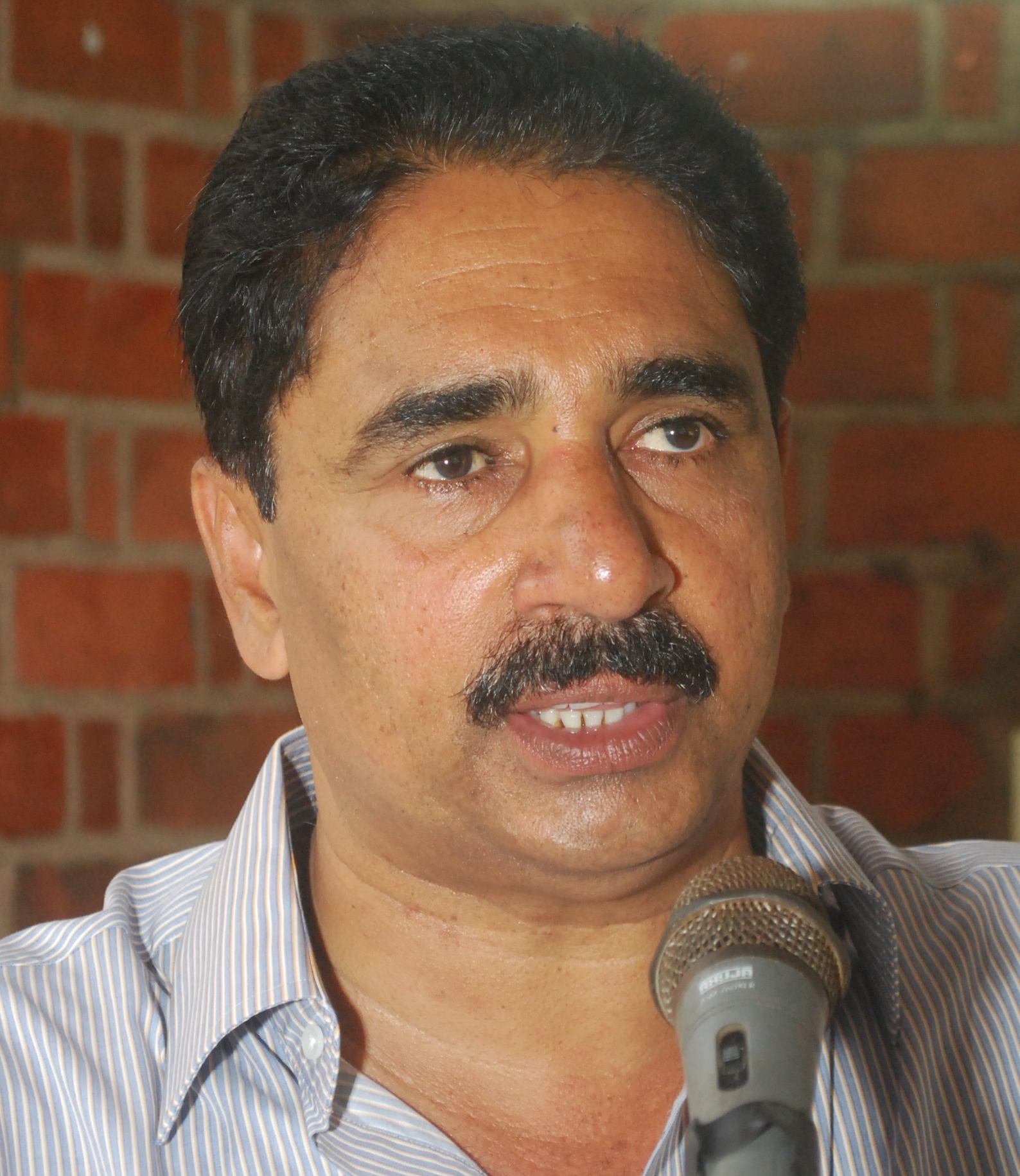
- Premachandran in 2018

Member of Panel of Chairpersons (Lok Sabha)
- Incumbent
- Assumed office 31 July 2025 Serving with Sandhya Ray, Dilip Saikia, Jagdambika Pal, Krishna Prasad Tenneti, Kakoli Ghosh Dastidar, A. Raja, P. C. Mohan, Awadhesh Prasad, Selja Kumari
- Appointed by: Om Birla
- In office 4 July 2019 – 9 June 2024
- Appointed by: Om Birla

Member of Parliament, Lok Sabha
- Incumbent
- Assumed office 16 May 2014
- Preceded by: N. Peethambara Kurup
- Constituency: Kollam, Kerala
- In office 10 May 1996 – 6 October 1999
- Preceded by: S. Krishna Kumar
- Succeeded by: P. Rajendran
- Constituency: Kollam, Kerala

Minister of Water Resources of Kerala
- In office 18 May 2006 – 16 May 2011
- Preceded by: Thiruvanchoor Radhakrishnan
- Succeeded by: P. J. Joseph
- Constituency: Chavara

Personal details
- Born: Navaikulam Krishna Pillai Premachandran; 25 May 1960 (age 66) Navaikulam, Kerala, India
- Party: Revolutionary Socialist Party
- Spouse: S. Geetha (m. 1991)
- Children: 1
- Education: Bachelor of Science; Bachelor of Laws
- Alma mater: Fatima Mata National College, Kollam; Government Law College, Thiruvananthapuram

Navaikulam Krishna Pillai Premachandran (born 25 May 1960) is an Indian politician who is a member of the Revolutionary Socialist Party. He is presently a member of Lok Sabha representing Kollam Lok Sabha constituency.

== Early life ==
N.K. Premachandran was born into a Nair family to N. Krishana Pillai and Maheswari Amma on May 25, 1960, in Navaikulam, which is Kollam-Trivandrum border of Trivandrum district. His family roots are from Kollam and Northern part of Trivandrum districts.

He completed BSc from Fatima Mata National College, Kollam. He passed LLB from Government Law College, Thiruvananthapuram with record marks and with first rank in 1985.

== Career ==
He was the former minister for Water Resources in the Government of Kerala and was responsible for irrigation, ground water development, water supply and sanitation. He was a member of both houses of the Parliament of India (Lok Sabha and Rajya Sabha). He is known for his public speeches. Premachandran has written a book Oh Iraq based on his travel experience to Iraq. He was instrumental in taking up the issue of the safety of Mullaperiyar Dam.

He initiated a number of innovative steps in drinking water sector. He began the consultancy wing of Kerala Water Authority called Wascon and mooted the bottled water plant and pipe factory.

== Political History ==
NK Premachandran is currently the Central Secretariat Member of the RSP (India). He started his political career through the student organisation of RSP. During his political career he held various positions at both state and national level.

He was elected as Member of the Navaikulam Grama Panchayat between 1987 and 1995. He was elected as a Member of District Panchayat in 1995. He was elected to Lok Sabha for the first time in 1996 and thereafter in 1998 and 2014 from Kollam Constituency. He was elected to Rajya Sabha in 2000. He was elected to the Kerala Legislative Assembly from Chavara Assembly constituency in Kollam district and became a Minister for Water Resources during 2006–2011. He is a Parliamentarian and orator.

In the 2019 Indian general election, he won from the Kollam Lok Sabha constituency with a record margin of 1.5 lakh votes. He introduced a private member bill overturning Sabarimala verdict and it was the first private bill introduced in 17th Lok Sabha.

In the 2024 Indian general election, he won from the Kollam Lok Sabha constituency with a record margin of more than 1.5 lakh votes.

== Positions Held ==
Date / Period	Position / Role
June 2024	Elected to 18th Lok Sabha (5th term); Member, Consultative Committee, Ministry of Home Affairs (June 2024 onwards); Member, Committee on Finance (26-Sep-2024 onwards); Member, Committee on Subordinate Legislation (14-May-2025); Member, Select Committee on the Jan Vishwas (Amendment of Provisions) Bill, 2025 (01-Oct-2025)
May 2019	Re-elected to 17th Lok Sabha (4th term); Member, Consultative Committee, Ministry of Labour and Employment (May 2019 onwards); Member, Panel of Chairpersons, Lok Sabha (3 July 2019 onwards); Member, Standing Committee on Chemicals & Fertilisers (13 Sep 2019 onwards); Member, General Purposes Committee, Lok Sabha (21 Nov 2019 onwards); Member, Standing Committee on External Affairs (13 Sep 2020 onwards)
May 2014	Re-elected to 16th Lok Sabha (3rd term); Member, Standing Committee on Human Resource Development (1 Sep 2014 – 25 May 2019); Member, Joint Committee on Food Management in Parliament House Complex (15 Sep 2014 – 25 May 2019)
2006 – 2011	Member, Kerala Legislative Assembly; Cabinet Minister, Water Resources, Government of Kerala
2000 – 2006	Member, Rajya Sabha; Member, Committee on Commerce (2000–2002); Member, Committee on Food, Civil Supplies and Public Distribution (Jan 2003 – Feb 2004); Member, Consultative Committee, Ministry of Power (2003–2004); Member, Committee on Commerce (Aug 2004 onwards); Member, Committee on Subordinate Legislation (Aug 2004 onwards); Member, Consultative Committee, Ministry of Civil Aviation (Oct 2004 – 17 May 2006)
1998 - 99	Re-elected to 12th Lok Sabha (2nd term)
1996–1998	Member, Coconut Development Board
1996 - 98	Elected to 11th Lok Sabha (1st term); Member, Committee on Subordinate Legislation (1996 onwards)
1991–1993	Member, District Council, Thiruvananthapuram
1995–1997	Member, Jilla Panchayat, Thiruvananthapuram
1987–1995	Member, Grama Panchayat, Navaikulam
