= Communist Marxist Party (Aravindakshan) =

- Abbreviation: CMP(A)
- Founder: K. R. Aravindakshan
- Founded: March 2014 (12 years ago)
- Split from: Communist Marxist Party
- Merged into: Communist Party of India (Marxist)
- Ideology: Marxism; Communism
- Alliance: Left Democratic Front (Kerala)

Communist Marxist Party (Aravindakshan) was one of the two splinter factions of CMP, which was led by K.R. Aravindakshan at the time of founding. In 2019, the party merged with CPI(M).

== Main leaders ==
- K.R. Aravindakshan
- M. K. Kannan
