= Revolutionary Socialist Party of Kerala (Bolshevik) =

- Leader: A. V. Thamarakshan
- Founder: Baby John, K.G George Kurudamannil
- Founded: 2001
- Split from: Revolutionary Socialist Party
- Merged into: Janathipathiya Samrakshana Samithy
- Succeeded by: Kerala Revolutionary Socialist Party (Baby John), Revolutionary Socialist Party of India (Marxist)
- Headquarters: Alappuzha (India)
- Student wing: AIPSU(B)
- Youth wing: RYF(B)
- Labour wing: UTUC(B)

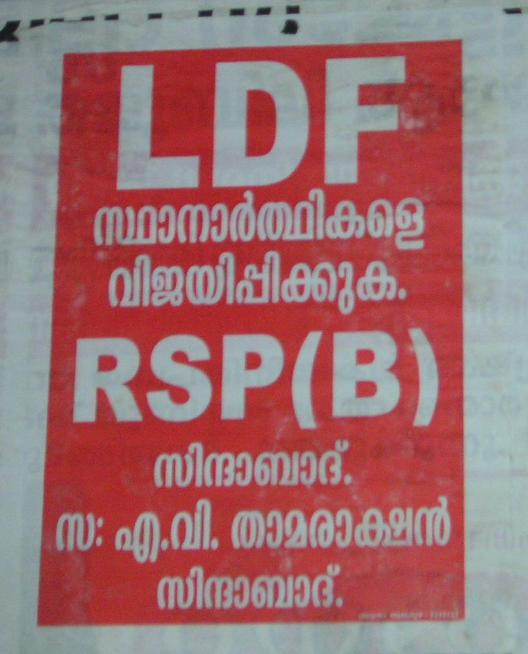

Revolutionary Socialist Party of Kerala (Bolshevik) is formed as a splinter group from RSP in Kerala in 2001. The party leader at the time of its formation was Baby John, formerly an important RSP leader in Kerala.

RSP(B) joined the UDF, the alliance in Kerala which is led by the INC. The party won 2 seats in the state assembly, Shibu Baby John and Babu Divakaran, in the 2001 election. Babu Divakaran became the Minister of Labour in the state government.

In 2005 RSP(B) left UDF, a decision largely attributed to the party general secretary A. V. Thamarakshan. Babu Divakaran split away and formed the RSP(M). RSP(M) joined in UDF.. RSP(B) merged with JSS in 2009.

== Alliance and break-up ==
RSP(B) had an alliance with BJP in Kerala since 2014 till 2016 when A.V. Thamarakshan decided to break the alliance and go alone in the 2016 Kerala assembly elections.

== Mass organizations ==
- United Trade Union Congress (B) (UTUC(B))
- Revolutionary Youth Front (B) (RYF(B))
- All India Progressive Students' Union (B) (AIPSU(B))

== See also ==
- Revolutionary Socialist Party
- Revolutionary Socialist Party of India (Marxist)
- Revolutionary Socialist Party (Leninist)
