= Nellikkatta =

Village in Kerala, India

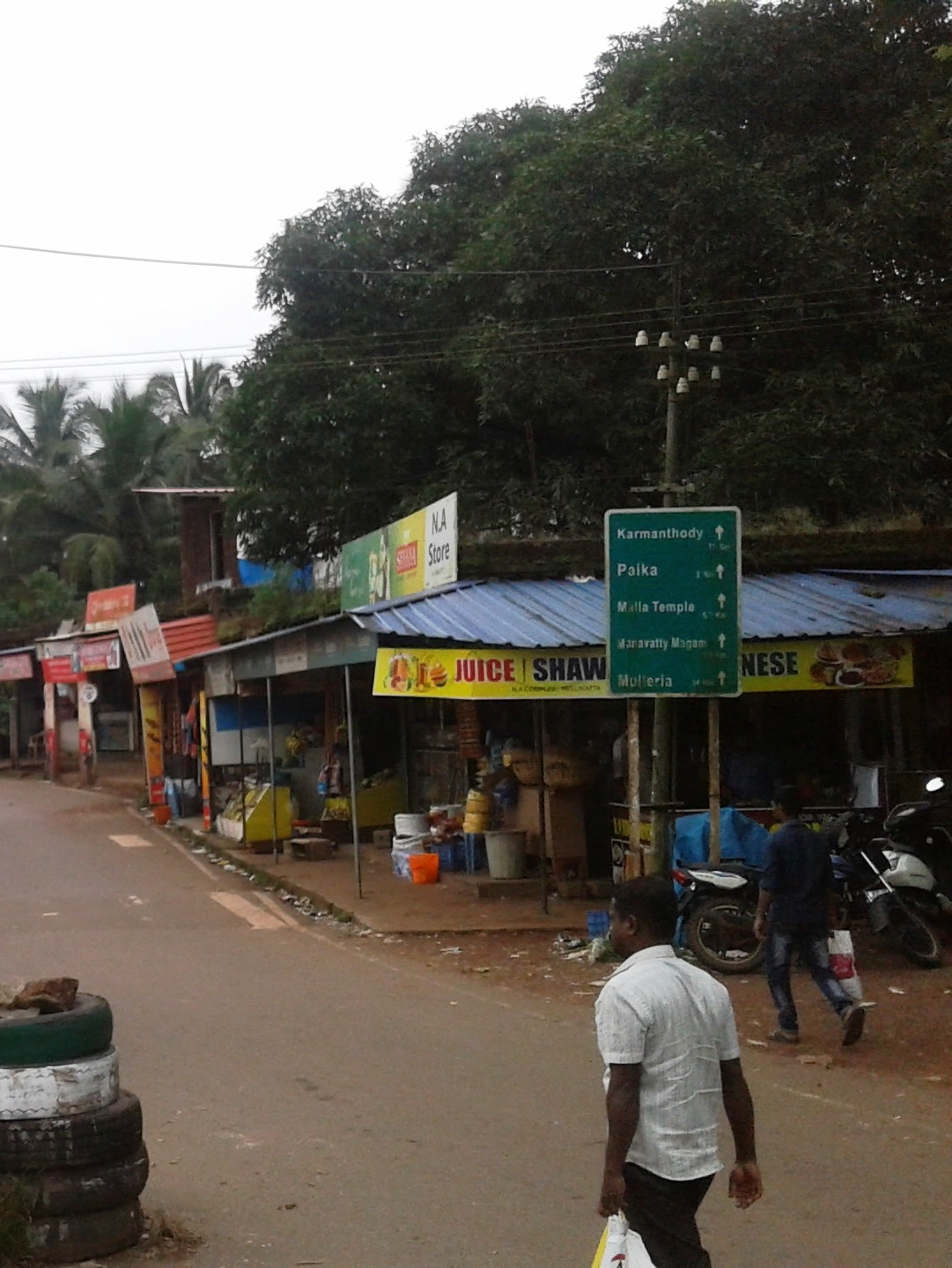
Nellikkatta Junction

Nellikkatta is a small village in Kasaragod district of Kerala state in India.

== Location ==
Nellikkatta is located between Cherkkala junction and Badiyadkka town. It is six kilometers away from Cherkkala town.

== Post Office ==
The nearest post office is at Edneer and the pin code is 671541.

== Education ==
- P.M.B.E.Higher Secondary School is the biggest educational organization of this village.
- Government High School, Edneer.
- Swamiji's High School, Edneer.

== Edneer Temple ==
The famous Edneer Mutt is near Nellikkatta. Edneer Mutt (Shri Edneer Mutt) is a Hindu monastic institution renowned as a seat of art and learning located in Edneer, Kasaragod district, Kerala State of India and it belongs to the parampara of Sri Thotakacharya, one of the first four disciples of Sri Adi Shankaracharya and follows the unique Smartha Bhagawatha tradition of Advaitha Tradition which has more than 1200 years of glorious history of religion, culture, art, music and social service.

Srimad Jagadguru Sri Sri Sankaracharya Thotakacharya Sri Kesavananda Bharati Sripadangalavaru (also known as Edneer Swamiji or Pontiff of Edneer/Kerala Shankaracharya or Shankaracharya of Kerala) is the present head and Guru of Sri Edneer Mutt. Sri Kesavananda Bharati is also the most referred name in the Indian Constitutional Law. He is the only Shankaracharya in the whole state of Kerala. It is also formally known as "Sri Shankaracharya Totakacharya Mahasamsthanam".

Edneer Mutt is also one of the important tourist destinations of Kasaragod district, Kerala State of India.
