= Kotta =

Kotta may refer to:

- Kotta, India, a village in Kerala
- Kotta, Indonesia, former name of Kuta, Bali
- Jean-Pierre Kotta (born 1956), Central African basketball player
- Kostaq Kotta (1886–1947), Albanian politician
- Venetia Kotta (1897 or 1901 – 1945), Greek archaeologist
- Kotta Abdul Khader Musliyar (1939–2008), Indian Islamic scholar
