= Kasaragod North =

Kasaragod North Mogral, Kumbla
- town
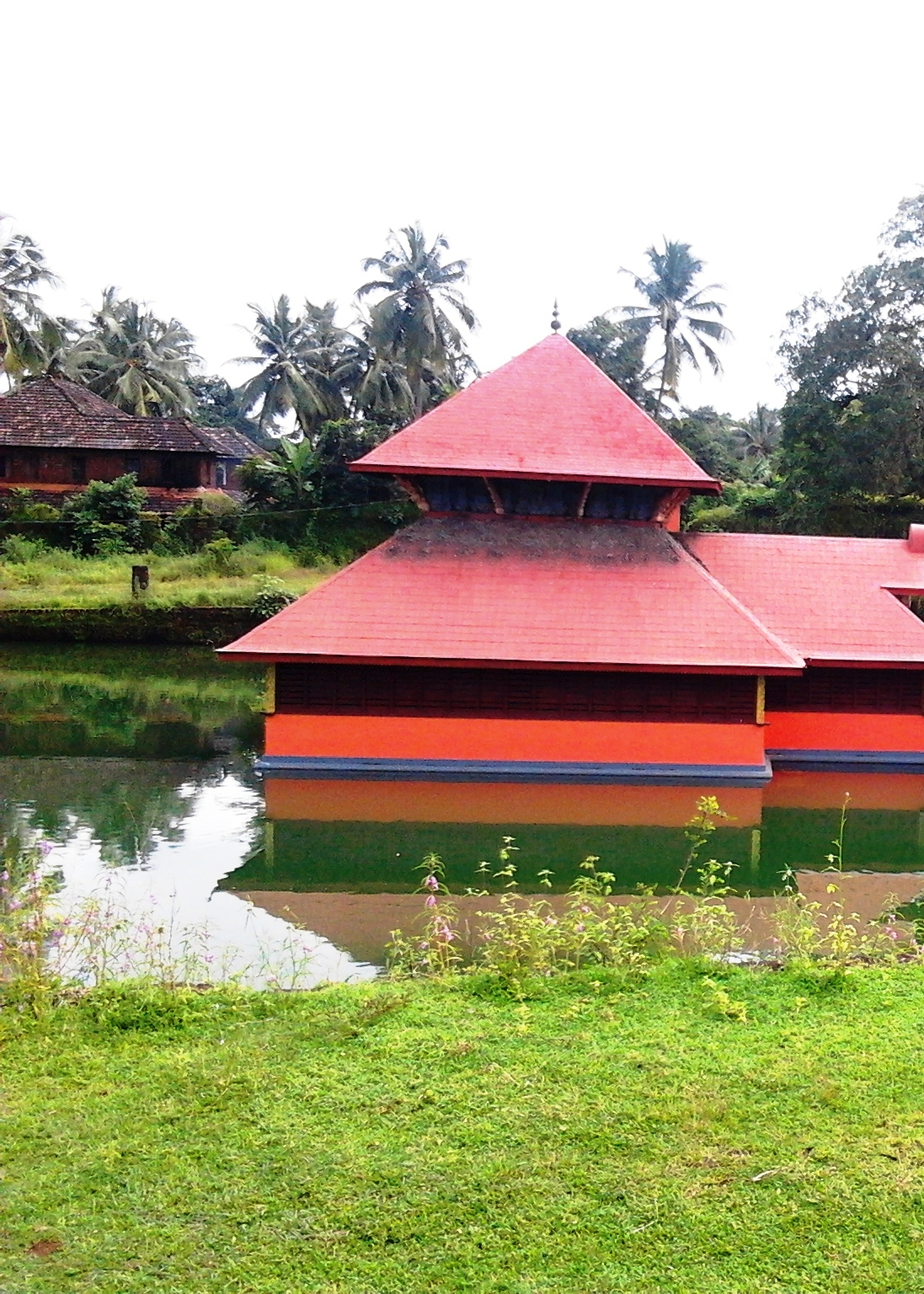
- Lake Temple, Kumbla

- Location in Kerala, India
- Coordinates: 12.54032°N 74.96058°E
- Country: India
- State: Kerala
- District: Kasargod

Government
  - Body: Panchayat

Languages
  - Official: Malayalam
- Time zone: UTC+5:30 (IST)
- PIN: 671321
- Telephone code: 4998
- Vehicle registration: KL-14
- Nearest city: Mangaluru
- Lok Sabha constituency: Kasaragod

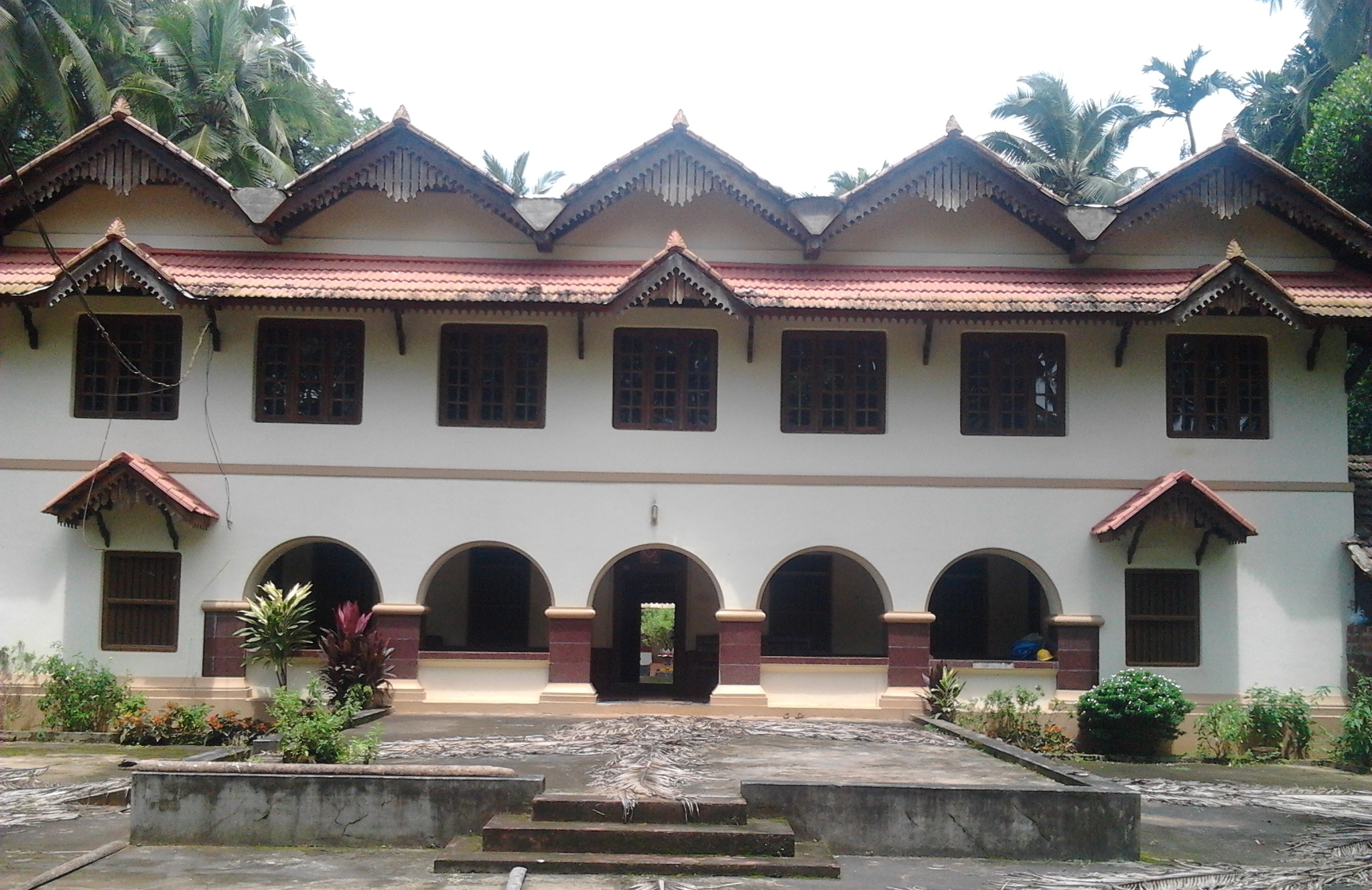
Maippady Palace, Kumbla

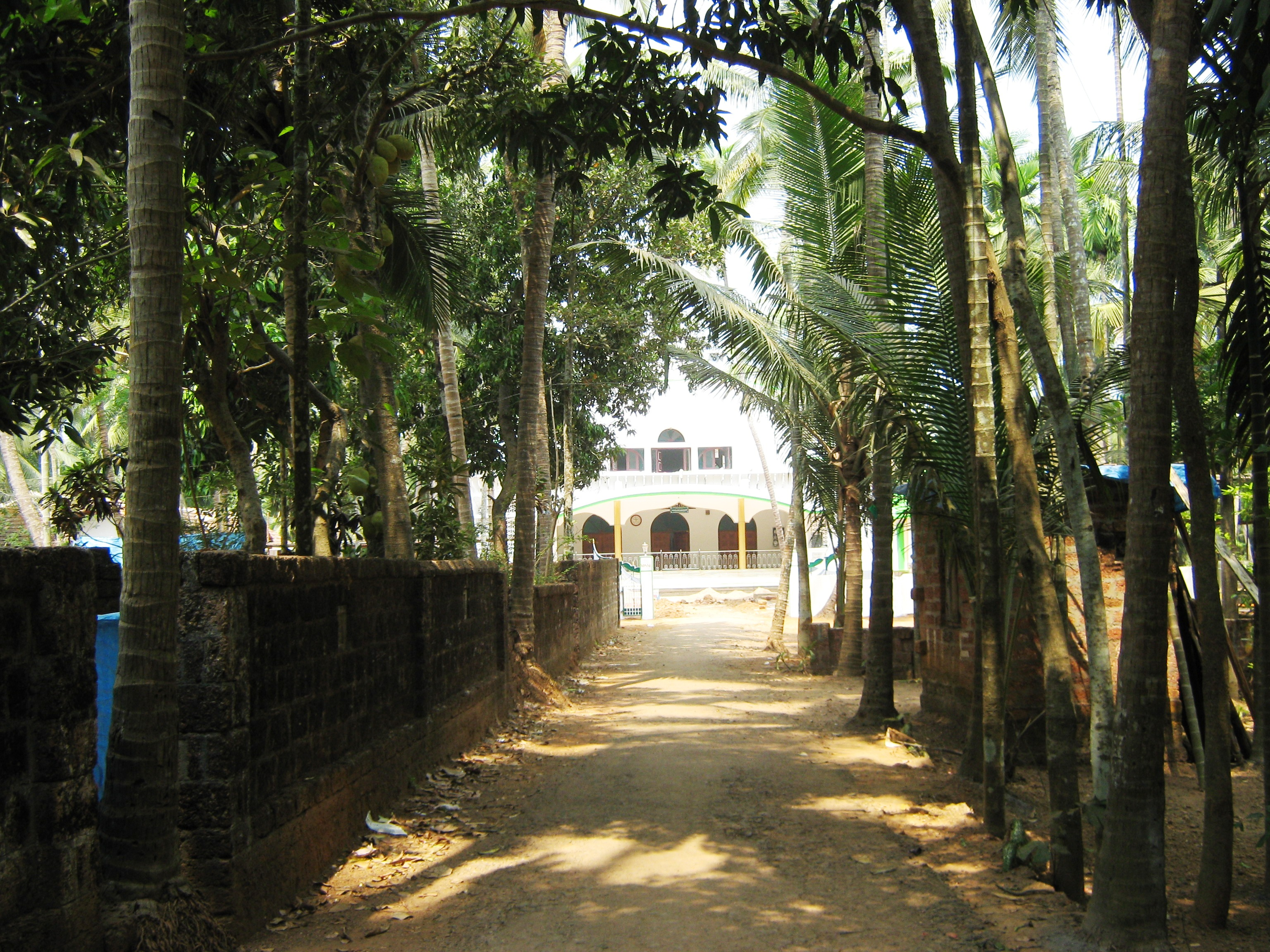
Olayam Dargah, Shiriya

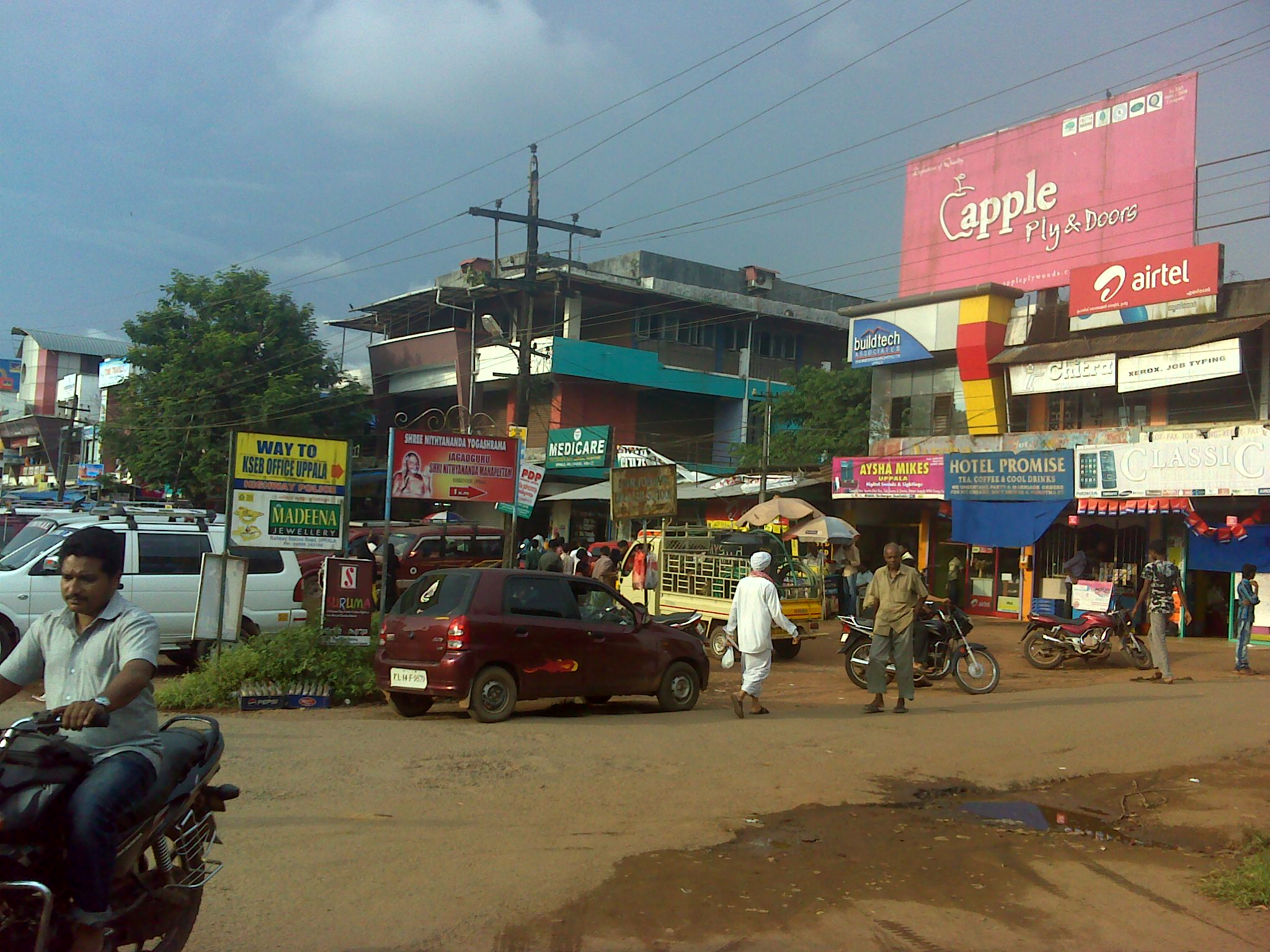
Uppala Town

Kasaragod North is a suburb of Kasaragod city in north Kerala. It is located at the mouth of a lagoon formed by the Shiriya river. The following townships, suburbs and villages are part of Kasaragod North:

- Kumbla
- Mogral
- Shiriya
- Aripady
- Mangalpady
- Uppala

== History ==
Kumbla was once the seat of the Kumbla Kings l, who ruled the southern part of Tuluva Kingdom. It was a small port in ancient times. In the 16th century A.D. (1514), Duarte Barbosa, the Portuguese traveller, visited Kumble and he had recorded that he had found people exporting rice to the Maldives in exchange of coir When Tippu Sultan captured Mangaluru, the Kumble Raja fled to Thalassery; but he returned in 1799 and after an unsuccessful fight for independence, submitted to the British Empire and accepted a small pension of Rs. 11,788 per annum in 1804. Parthisubba, the great Yakshagana exponent, known as Father of Yakshagana was born here in the 18th century.

== Uppala ==
Uppala is a town in Kasaragod North and it is situated between Kasaragod and Mangalore. It is around 22 km north to the Kasaragod town and 30 km south to Mangalore city. Uppala is located about 586 km north to the state capital, Thiruvananthapuram. National Highway 66, which used to be known as NH 17, passes through the town. Uppala used to be known as Kurchipalla. According to census, the town has a population of 41,212 with the density around 1650 per square kilometre. As Uppala is located very near to the Arabian Sea, it has a very low elevation of nine metres. The town is densely populated near the National Highway 66. Uppala is a major infrastructural hub in the district and is noted for jewellery shops, fast food restaurants and high residential flats which lies across the town. High rises can be seen in town. It is the major destination for retail shopping in the district. Many projects are active in the town. It is also a major business hub in the district and also contributed for the rise in remittance in the state, in the most prevalent sectors like real estate, infrastructure, financial institutions, hospitality and healthcare. The locals speaks many languages such as Malayalam, Tulu, Hindi, Urdu and Kannada. It has been selected as the centre of Urdu language in the region.

== Mogral ==
Mogral (മൊഗ്രാല്‍) is a village in Kasaragod district in the state of Kerala, India. Mogral is part of Kumbla gram panchayat. The Mogral River flows in southern border of Mogral. As of 2001 India census, Mogral had a population of 7449 with 3647 males and 3802 females. Mogral has one government school, GVHSS Mogral. Other schools include Essa English Medium High School.

A regional center for Study Mappila pattu and folk Arts was set up at Mogral 2009 under Mahakavi Mohin Kutty Vaidyar Memorial Center Kondotty Malappuram.

Govternment Unani hospital Mogral The only one hospital for under govt of kerala. 1985 ( Unani medicine) Mogral Sports Club (MSC) is one of the oldest (started 1918) sports clubs. There are sports clubs like Deenar Gally, Rising Stars, Citizen Kadavath, Koppalam F C, Rovers Mogral, Perwad Sports Club, Nadupallam FC and Priyadharsini sports club (1985) kekepuram. Nangi Club.

MSC is about 100-year-old sports club which is popular for its football team which have won major titles in Kasaragod District and adjacent districts.

MSL was the grand event of football which took place at Mogral. Tournament was an Indian Premier League (IPL) meets English Premier League(EPL) style 7-a-side football tournament organised by the Mogral Sports Club U A E committee.

Players were selected by teams through auction which was a new experience to the people gathered.

== Transport ==
- Kasaragod North is situated on NH-17. There are frequent State-owned bus services ( both by Karnataka & Kerala ) that connect Kumbla and Mogral to Kasaragod and Mangaluru
- Indian Railways passes through Kumbla and does have a small train station, connecting the town to the Malabar region in Kerala and to nearest big city Mangaluru (Mangalore). As of now, 14 trains including 8 express trains and 6 local trains stop in Kumble.
- The nearest airport is in Mangaluru. The old name of the airport Bajpe. Mangaluru, approximately about 45 Kilometers (30 Miles) from Kumbla, connected through local taxies and buses.
- To the east, a local road, winds through Ananthapuram, Neerchal, Badiyadka all the way up to Puttur and beyond.

== Educational Institutions ==
- Govt.Senior Basic School, an upper primary school situated near the heart of Kumbla Town. Over a century old, and has a number of experienced hands in teaching.
- Govt. Higher Secondary School, situated near Kumbla Police Station, the only Govt. Higher Secondary in Kumbla.
- College of Applied Science Manjeshwer, an Institute managed by IHRD Kerala. Offering Under Graduate and Post Graduate Degrees in Computer Science and Electronics.
- Holy Family Aided Senior Basic School is situated at Badiadka Road, which celebrated its 75 years (Diamond Jubilee) in 2010.
- Khansa Women's College for Advanced Studies, Situated in Kumbla
- Essa English Secondary School, Pervad, Kumbla.
- Kumbla Academy of Higher Education, Kumbla. The Managing Director of Kumbla Academy is Ibrahim Kaleel Nellikunnu, who is well known for his teaching, social service and commitment to the society.

== See also ==
- Manjeshwar
- Perla

== Image gallery ==
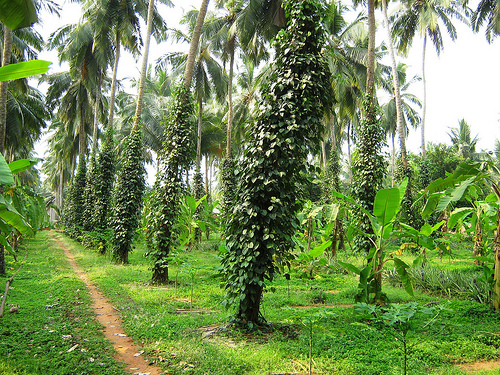
CPCRI on Kumbla Road

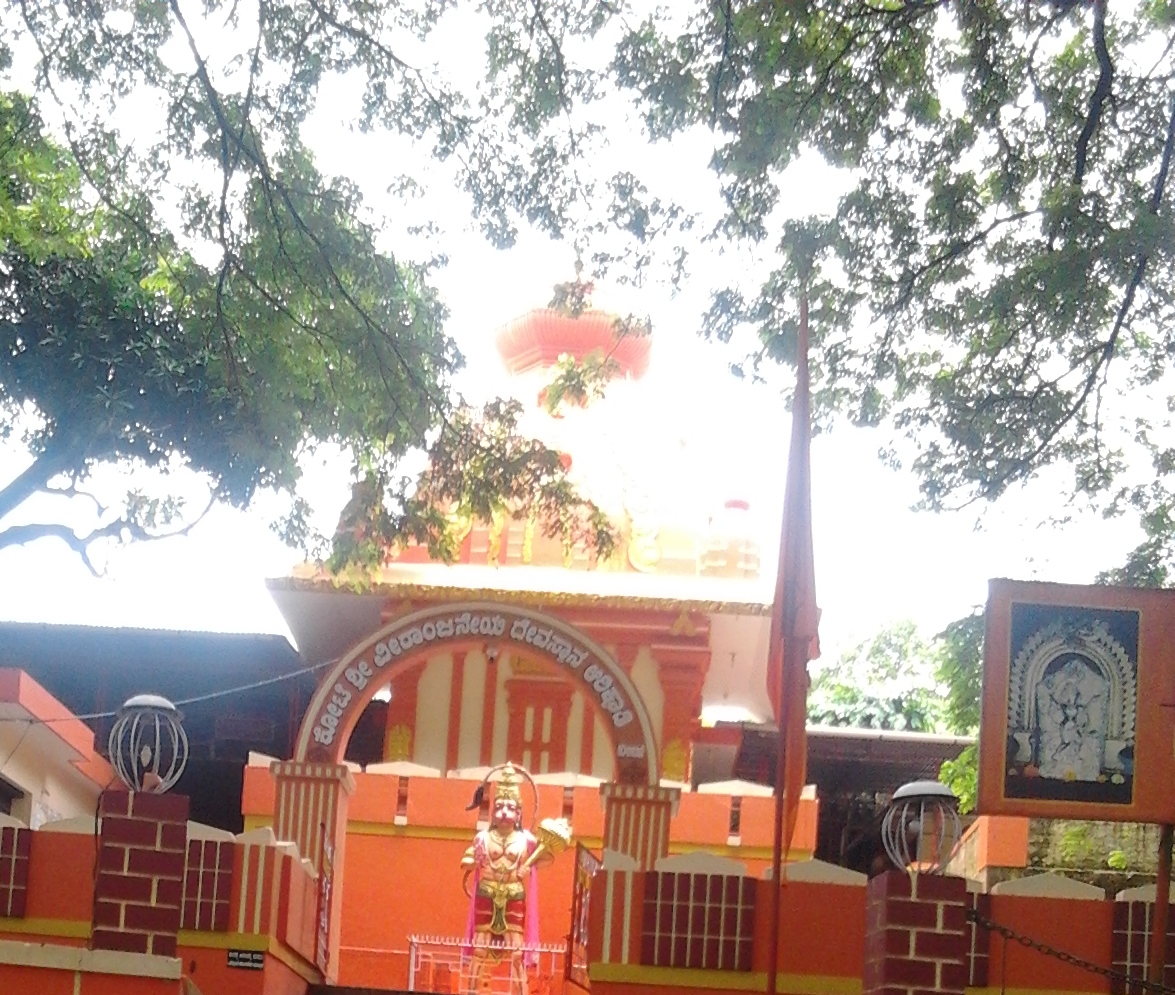
Arikkady Temple, Kumbla, Kasaragod

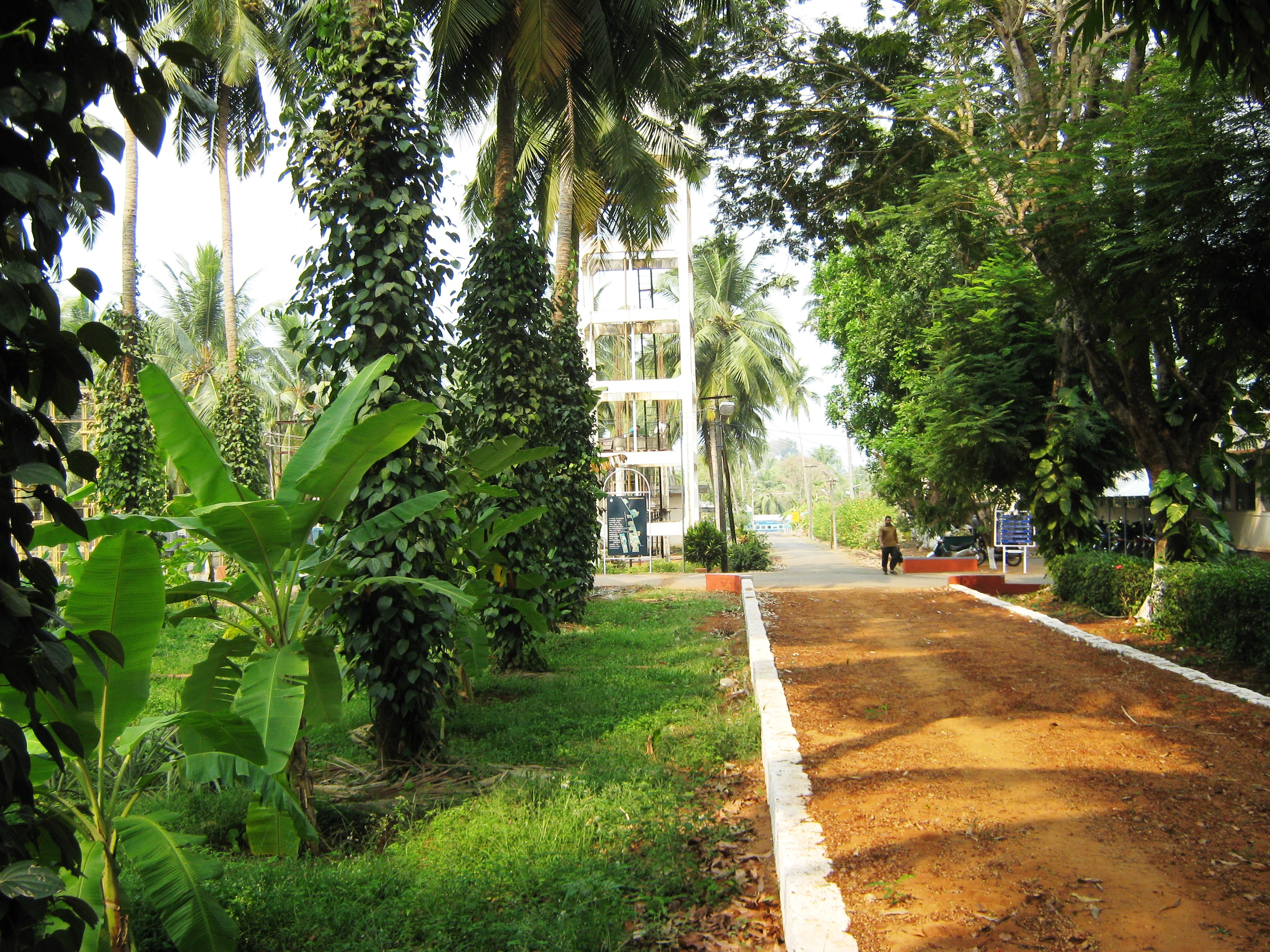
CPCRI
