= Mogral River =

River in India

The Mogral River (also known as the Madhuvahini River) is a west-flowing river in the Kasaragod district in the Indian state of Kerala. It is named after Mogral, a coastal village on its northern banks. The river empties into the Arabian Sea at Mogral Puthur. It has a length of 34 kilometers and a drainage area of 132 square kilometers.

== Course ==
The river originates in the lower foothills of the Western Ghats at the Karadka Reserve Forest in the Kasaragod district. Initially it flows through several hilly towns in the eastern region of Kasargod, namely, Badiyadka, Karadka, Mulleriya, Paika, Edneer and Nekraje. From Nekraje, the river takes a meandering course enters the Malabar plains where passes the towns of Pady, Cherkala, Muttathody, Chettumkuzhy, Shiribagilu, Madhur, Patla, Kannathur, Peral, Mogral and Puthur. Towards Mogral Puthur, the Mogral River empties into the Arabian Sea forming an estuary Lake.

=== Flora and Fauna ===
There is a significant patch of mangroves in the three-kilometer stretch of estuary where Mogral River merges with the Arabian Sea. The total area of the estuary is estimated to be 6.12 square kilometer, of which 0.1 kilometer is mangrove area. Two researchers reported sighting six individual Bar-Headed Geese (Anser indicus) on fresh water near the mangroves on 26 January 2009. Bar-Headed Geese, one of the world's highest flying birds, are rarely seen in Kerala.

=== See also ===
- List of rivers in Kerala
- Mogral Puthur
- Mogral
