= Edneer Mutt =

Hindu monastic institution in Kerala, India

Edaneeru Mutt (Malayalam: eṭanīru maṭhaṁ) is a Hindu monastic institution renowned as a seat of art and learning located in Edneer, Kasaragod district, Kerala, India. It traces its parampara to Sri Thotakacharya, one of the first four disciples of Adi Shankaracharya, and it follows the Smarta Bhagawatha tradition and the Advaita Vedanta school of Hindu philosophy.

From 1961 to 2020, the institution was headed by Kesavananda Bharati, whose full honorific title as head of the mutt was Srimad Jagadguru Sri Sri Sankaracharya Thotakacharya Kesavananda Bharati Sripadangalavaru. The head of the mutt is also known as Edaneeru Swamiji or Pontiff of Edaneeru.

Edaneeru Mutt was involved in Kesavananda Bharati v. State of Kerala, where the Supreme Court of India developed the basic structure doctrine of constitutional law in striking down an attempt by the Government of Kerala to seize the mutt's property.

Edaneeru Mutt is also a key tourist destination in the district.

== Gallery ==
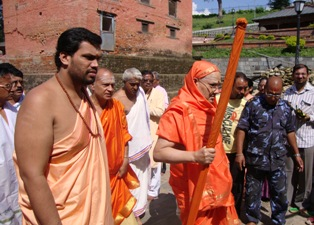
Sri Shankaracharya Kesavananda Bharati (on the right) in Shri Pashupatinath Temple in Nepal in October 2009 with Indian activist Harikumar Pallathadka (on the left).

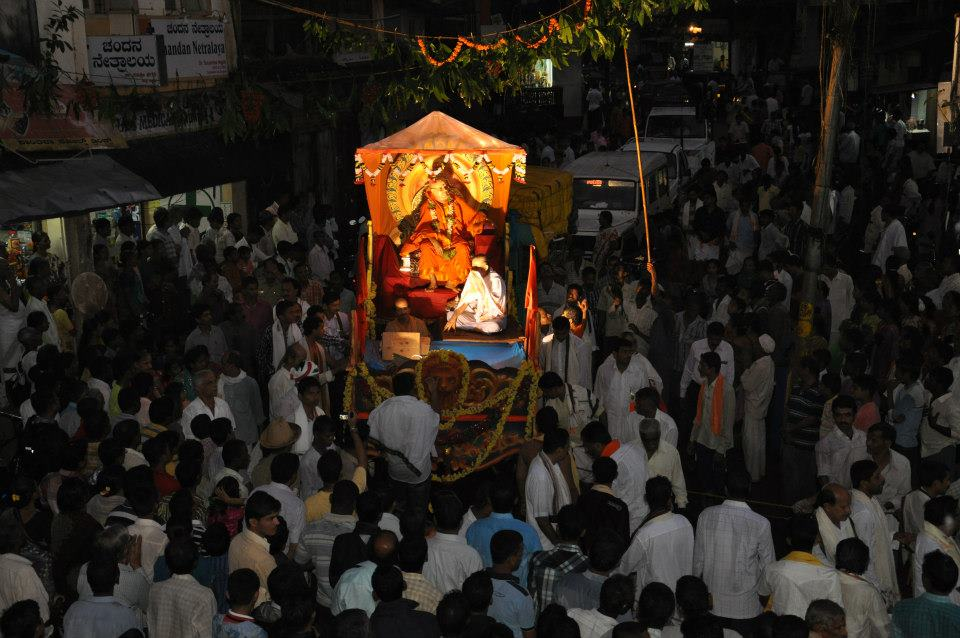
Procession of Edneer Swamiji by his disciples in Kumta, 2012.

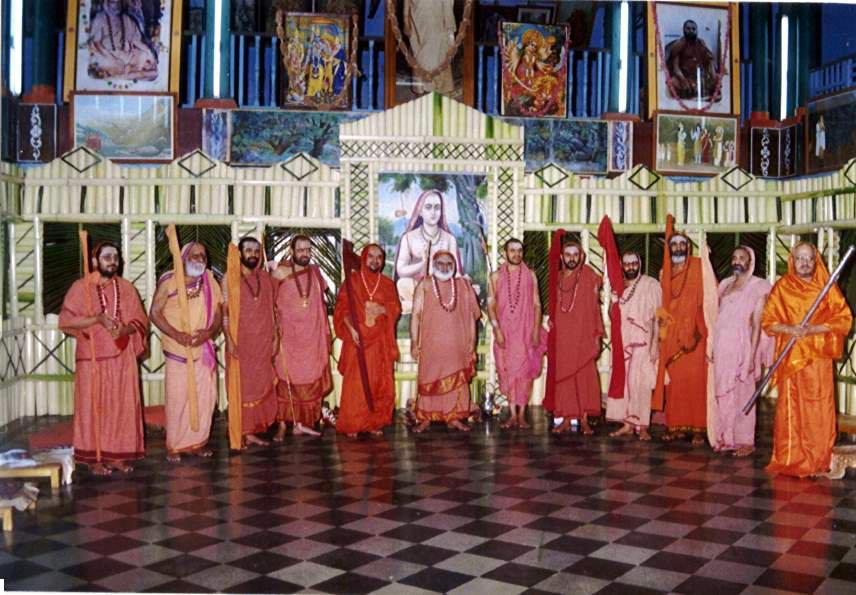
Shri Kesavananda Bharati (far right) with other Shankaracharyas' in a regional Shankaracharya meet.

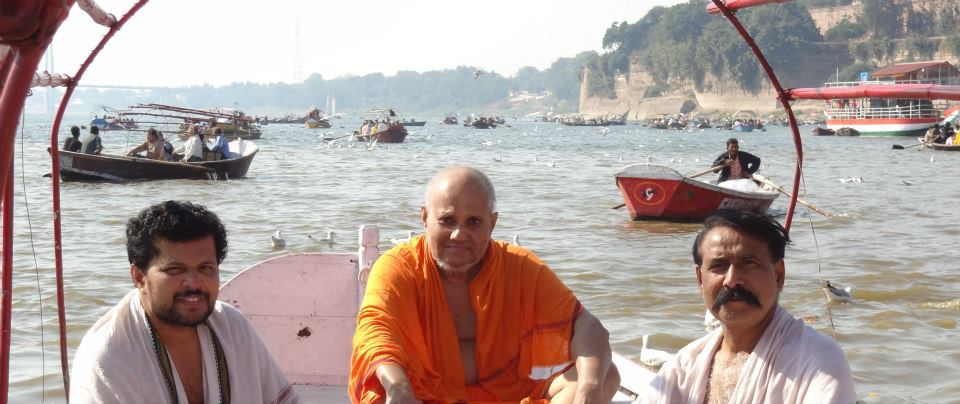
Shri Kesavananda Bharati with devotees at Maha Kumbha Mela at Allahabad in Feb 2013.

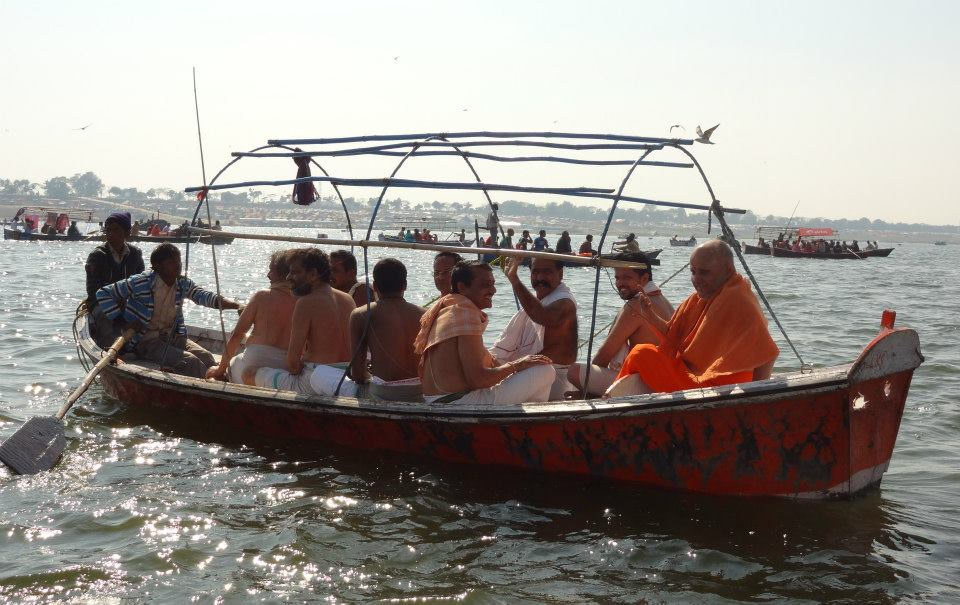
Shri Kesavananda Bharati with devotees at Maha Kumbha Mela at Allahabad in Feb 2013.

== See also ==
- Kesavananda Bharati v. State of Kerala
