= Puthur (Kasaragod) =

- Census Town
- Location in Kerala, India Puthur (India)
- Coordinates: 12.5525°N 74.9605°E
- Country: India
- State: Kerala
- District: Kasaragod

Government
  - Type: Panchayati raj (India)
  - Body: Mogral Puthur Panchayat

Area
  - Total: 8.4 km^{2} (3.2 sq mi)

Population (2011)
  - Total: 14,271
  - Density: 1,700/km^{2} (4,400/sq mi)

Languages
  - Official: Malayalam, English
- Time zone: UTC+5:30 (IST)
- PIN: 671124
- ISO 3166 code: IN-KL
- Vehicle registration: KL-14

Puthur is a census town in Kasaragod district in the Indian state of Kerala. Puthur is a suburb of Kasaragod city.

== Demographics ==
As of 2011 Census, Puthur had a population of 14,271 with 6,749 males and 7,522 females. Puthur census town has an area of 8.4 km^{2} (3.2 sq mi) with 2,659 families residing in it. The average sex ratio was 1114 higher than the state average of 1084. 14.4% of the population was under 6 years of age. Puthur had average literacy of 89.75% higher than the national average of 74.04% and lower than state average of 94.00%; male literacy was 93.87% and female literacy was 86.14%.

== Religions ==
As of 2011 census, Puthur census town had total population of 14,271, among which 70.8% are Muslims, 28.6% Hindus, 0.5% Christians, and 0.1% Others.

== Administration ==
Puthur is part of Mogral Puthur Grama Panchayat in Kasaragod Block. This area comes under Kasaragod Assembly constituency which is part of Kasaragod Loksabha.
