= Mogral Puthur =

Mogral Puthur Mora Puthur North Kasargod
- Town
- Location in Kerala, India
- Coordinates: 12.55416°N 74.959577°E
- Country: India
- State: Kerala
- District: Kasaragod
- Taluk: Kasaragod

Government
  - Body: Grama Panchayat

Area
  - Total: 14.23 km^{2} (5.49 sq mi)

Population (2011)
  - Total: 24,839

Languages
  - Official: Malayalam, English
- Time zone: UTC+5:30 (IST)
- PIN: 671124
- Telephone code: + 91 - 499-4
- Vehicle registration: KL-14

Mogral Puthur is a gram panchayat in the Kasaragod District, state of Kerala, India. It is north of the town of Kasaragod, and it consists of two revenue villages (Puthur and Kudlu). The village of Puthur (also called Mogral Puthur) is the northern portion of the roughly circular panchayat, and Kudlu encompasses the southern half. Mogral Puthur has on its west border the Arabian Sea; on the east is the Madhur panchayat; and on the north is the Mogral River (separates Mogral Puthur from the Kumbla and Puthige panchayats). The total area of this "second-grade" panchayat is 14.23 square kilometers. The major business centers are: Puthur, Chowki, Padinhar and Eriyal.

== Demographics ==
According to the 2011 census, the total population of Mogral Puthur was 24,839, up from 14,123 in 1981. Females outnumber males, 52.42 percent to 47.58 percent, as per the 2011 census. It has a scheduled caste population of 1,283. Of the total population, 3,373 were under the age of 6. The panchayat's population density of 1, 745 per square kilometer is nearly twice that of Kerala and 4.8 times the national average. In 2001, there were 3,806 households.

Malayalam and Tulu are the major languages spoken in the area.

== Topography ==
The Mogral Puthur topography ranges from small hills and slopes to flat plains. The Mogral River, which forms its northern and a large part of the eastern border, supports much of its agriculture. There are several small monsoon-fed rivulets throughout the panchayat. Low-lying areas close to the U-shaped river and its tributaries are very fertile. The land gains elevation in the central part of the panchayat. In the central and eastern parts, there are rich laterite deposits.

== Transportation ==
Mogral Puthur is well-connected by road to Kasaragod, the district headquarters, and to Mangalore, a port city and major regional economic and education hub 43 kilometers to the north. It has a road density of 2 kilometers per square kilometer of land, the second highest in the Kasaragod district. The total length of roads in the panchayat is 28.5 kilometers.

The coastal National Highway 17, which links Mumbai and Kochi, runs through Mogral Puthur.

Bus transport in the area started in 1952, when Poyakkara Bus Service began operating a shuttle from the south side of the Mogral River in Puthur to Thalangara, on the northern bank of Chandragri.

There was no road link to Mogral Puthur from the northern side until the mid-1960s. Those travelling to Mangalore and other towns and cities in the north for employment and commerce had to go by train, or cross the Mogral River by ferry and then board a bus. When the construction of a bridge over the Mogral River was completed in 1964, connecting Kasaragod to Mangalore by road, it also opened new economic opportunities for people on both sides of the river.

Broad gauge Indian Railways tracks run almost parallel to the National Highway from north to south.

Passenger and goods trains has crossed the region for more than a century, since the then-Madras Railways opened a railway line between Kasaragod and Kumbla on 17 November 1906. In the early decades of the 20th century, there was a railway station in Kudlu, which was later moved a kilometer south to CPCRI.No trains stop there today.

== History ==
The Mogral Puthur area was earlier known as just Puthur. The name of Mogral, the adjoining village to the north, was added to its name during the British era following complaints that mail was being re-directed to the town of Puttur, now in Karnataka, located roughly 50 kilometers to the east.

The village used to house a police outpost before Independence. The first post office was established in Kudlu in 1940.

Mogral Puthur was designated as a panchayat in the early 1970s. The first meeting of the newly formed body was held on 8 February 1971. C.M. Abdulla was the first president.

== Gulf Migration ==
Like much of the Malabar region, remittances from Persian Gulf countries form a major source of income for families in the area. Labour migration to the Persian Gulf started in the 1950s and increased rapidly in the 1970s and 1980s. Today, more than a thousand from the Puthur village alone, nearly all of them men, are employed in the Gulf countries.

== Commerce and Agriculture ==
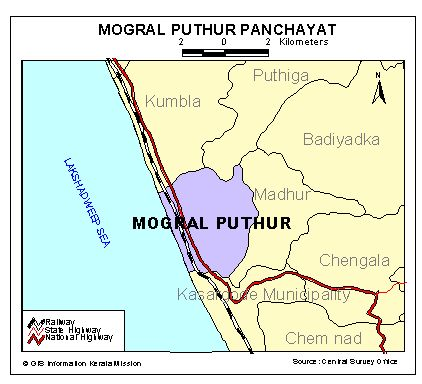

Until the 1970s, agriculture and petty trading were the primary economic activities in the area. There were also several fishing families. Men moved to places as far away as Ceylon, Calcutta, Visakhapatnam, Mumbai and Bangalore, as well as the neighbouring regions in Dakshina Kannada and Kodagu, as traders and labourers.

Like most other parts of Kerala, coconut is the most widely cultivated plantation crop in Mogral Puthur. The panchayat is also home to one of the largest coconut and plantation crops research centres in the world. Rice, peas, water melon, cucumber and banana are traditional produce of the area. Peas (known as Mogral peas), water melon and cucumber from here were popular till the 1970s. Apart from these seasonal harvests, Arecanut, mango and jackfruit are also cultivated.

In the past few decades, the dependence on agriculture has shrunk drastically. A population explosion, a growth in nuclear families and increased remittance flow have resulted in a housing boom, leading to mansions being erected in cultivable lands. The 2001 census figures show that the number of main cultivators in the panchayat has dwindled to 228 and main agricultural laborers to 137.

Several people were also employed in sand-mining and transportation. However, in 2005, sand mining was banned following complaints that it was weakening the foundations of the rail bridge nearby and endangering the lives of people in the locality.

== Industry ==
Kerala Electrical and Allied Engineering Co.Ltd. (KEL), a state government-owned company, has a manufacturing unit in Bedradka, in the eastern part of Mogral Puthur. The unit, which began operations in 1990 with technical know-how from the French Moteurs Leroy Somer, manufactures, among other products, diesel generator sets and general purpose brushless AC generators. Indian Railways is one of its major clients.

There are a few small-scale and cottage industries in the area. Beedi rolling was a major economic activity in the area in the 1970s and 1980s, providing employment to many women. Though some still practice the craft, as elsewhere in Kerala, the cottage industry has declined considerably in recent years.

The region's laterite quarries supply much of the bricks for the local construction industry.

There was a fledgling timber industry on the south bank of the Mogral River in the 1980s.

== Education and Health ==
The literacy rate in Mogral Puthur is 86.31 percent, well above the national average, but below the state average of 94.59.

The panchayat has two high schools, Mogral Puthur GHSS and Government Technical High School Mogral Puthur, and several primary and upper primary schools.

The first educational institution in the area was a lower-primary school started in the early part of the 20th century. For many years, it was manned by a lone teacher named Muddan. (Hence, that school was known as "Muddan's School".) Later, an upper primary school was established. It operated out of a rented property in Puthur till 1969, when the school moved to its own building. In the late 1970s, it was upgraded to a high school and to a higher secondary in the late 1990s.

There is one primary health care centre, one family welfare center, four private health dispensaries, and one government ayurveda dispensary.

== Research Institutions ==
The Central Plantation Crops Research Institute, a pioneering establishment, is the largest educational and research organisation in Mogral Puthur. Its predecessor, the Coconut Research Station, was set up in 1916 by the Government of Madras. In 1948, after the Indian independence, the station came under the Indian Central Coconut Committee. CPCRI was founded in 1970 by the Indian Council of Agricultural Research. Today, the institute conducts research in various agricultural fields such as gardening, soil chemistry, plant production, microbiology, plant diseases, cattle rearing and fish culture.

== Flora and fauna ==
Lush green coconut palms cover much of Mogral Puthur. There is a significant patch of mangroves in the three-kilometer stretch of estuary where Mogral River merges with the Arabian Sea. The total area of the estuary is estimated to be 6.12 square kilometer, of which 0.1 kilometer is mangrove area. Two researchers reported sighting six individual Bar-Headed Geese (Anser indicus) on fresh water near the mangroves on 26 January 2009. Bar-Headed Geese, one of the world's highest flying birds, are rarely seen in Kerala.

== Places of interest ==
The historic Kavu Matha, where Madhvacharya, the founder of the Dvaita philosophy, famously debated Trivikrama Panditacharya, who was then a proponent of Advaita, is in the panchayat. The eight-day debate (circa early 14th century/late 13th century) was held in the presence of King Jayasimba of Kumbla, and after the debate, the latter embraced Dvaita philosophy and became a disciple of Madhvacharya.

There are several mosques and temples across the panchayat. Kinnimani Poomani Daivastana (temple) in Bedradka, Doomavati Daivastana at Puthur Kotya and the Chowki, Eriyal, Kottakkunnu and Mogral Puthur jamma masjids are prominent among them.
