= Nekraje =

Village in Kerala, India

- Village
- Nickname: Nekkara
- Location in Kerala, India
- Coordinates: 12°32′35″N 75°5′0″E
- Country: India
- State: Kerala
- District: Kasaragod

Area
  - Total: 20.46 km^{2} (7.90 sq mi)

Population (2011)
  - Total: 12,519
  - Density: 611.9/km^{2} (1,585/sq mi)

Languages
  - Official: Malayalam, English
- Time zone: UTC+5:30 (IST)
- Postal code: 671543
- Vehicle registration: KL-14

Nekraje is a village in Kasaragod district in the state of Kerala, India.

== Demographics ==
As of 2011 Census, Nekraje village had a population of 12,519 which constitutes 6,110 males and 6,409 females. Nekraje village has an area of 20.26 km^{2} (7.82 sq mi) with 2,428 families residing in it. The male female sex ratio was 1049 lower than state average of 1084. Population in the age group 0-6 was 1,665 (13.3%) where 889 are males and 776 are females. Nekraje had an average literacy of 85.9% higher than the national average of 74% and lower than state average of 94%: male literacy was 90.9% and female literacy was 81.2%.
