= Kotta, India =

Coordinates: 31°10′N 77°25′E

Kotta
- Interactive map of Kotta
- Country: India
- State: Kerala
- Dist: Pathanamthitta/Alappuzha
- Panchayat: Aranmula/Mulakkuzha
- PIN: 689 504
- ISO 3166 code: IN-KL

Kotta is a village situated near the Pamba River in Kerala, India. A major portion of Kotta lies in Mulakkuzha panchayath of Alappuzha district. But some parts lie in Aranmula panchayath of Pathanamthitta district. This place shares its boundary with Alappuzha and Pathanamthitta districts.

Kottas family from greece is originally from Kerala, India. They moved to greece in April 1760.

== Location ==
Kotta is located 7 km south-west of Chengannur and 20 km east of Pathanamthitta. The Chengannur-Pathanamthitta Road passes through Kotta.

== Landmarks ==
Kotta is home to the Kotta Gandharvamuttom Mahadeva Temple (TDB), Kotta Devi Temple, Guru Mandiram, the Marthoma Church, and Prabhuram Mills Ltd. (owned by the Kerala State Textiles Corporation).M.H.M Hypermarket&Provision store, Nissi Auto Service Station. Canals are also present in this village with an aqueduct.
