= Mogral =

Mogral Mora, Mogaral
- village
- Location in Kerala, India
- Country: India
- State: Kerala
- District: Kasaragod

Population (2011)
  - Total: 8,912

Languages
  - Official: Malayalam, English
- Time zone: UTC+5:30 (IST)
- PIN: 671321
- Telephone code: 91 4998 21
- Vehicle registration: KL-14 & KL -85
- Nearest city: Manglore
- Literacy: 89.85%

Mogral is a village in Kasaragod district in the state of Kerala, India. It is part of the gram panchayat of Kumbla. The Mogral River is on the southern border of Mogral.

== Demographics ==
As of 2011 India census, Mogral had a population of 8912 with 4223 males and 4689 females.

== Transportation ==
National Highway 66 runs through Mogral, which connects Mogral.

== Notable people ==
- Kotta Abdul Khader Musliyar Islamic scholar.
