= Kotta Abdul Khader Musliyar =

Indian Islamic scholar

Kota Abdul Khader Musliyar
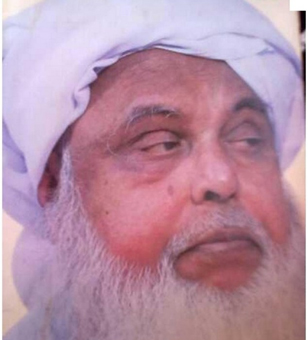
- Born: 17 November 1939; Kerala, India.
- Died: 3 September 2008 (aged 68)
- Other name: Kota Abdul Khader Musliyar
- Occupation: Islamic Scholar
- Known for: Joint secretary of Samastha Kerala Jamiyyathul Ulama, Quazi of Mangalore
- Spouse: Rukhiya
- Children: 8

Kota Abdul Khader Musliyar (Arabic: كود عبد القادر مسليار) was an Islamic scholar from Mogral, Kasaragod, in the Indian state of Kerala, and a member of Samastha Kerala Jamiyyathul Ulama.

== Life ==
He was the son of Sea-Man Kotta Mohammed (Mammunji) and Khadeeja, born on 17 November 1939 at Kasaragod district. He married Rooqiya.

He was joint secretary of Samastha Kerala Jamiyyathul Ulama.

Grandchildren : Mohammed Shajau Rahman etc...

== Death ==
He died on 3 September 2008.
