= Edneer =

Edaneeru Edneer
- Village
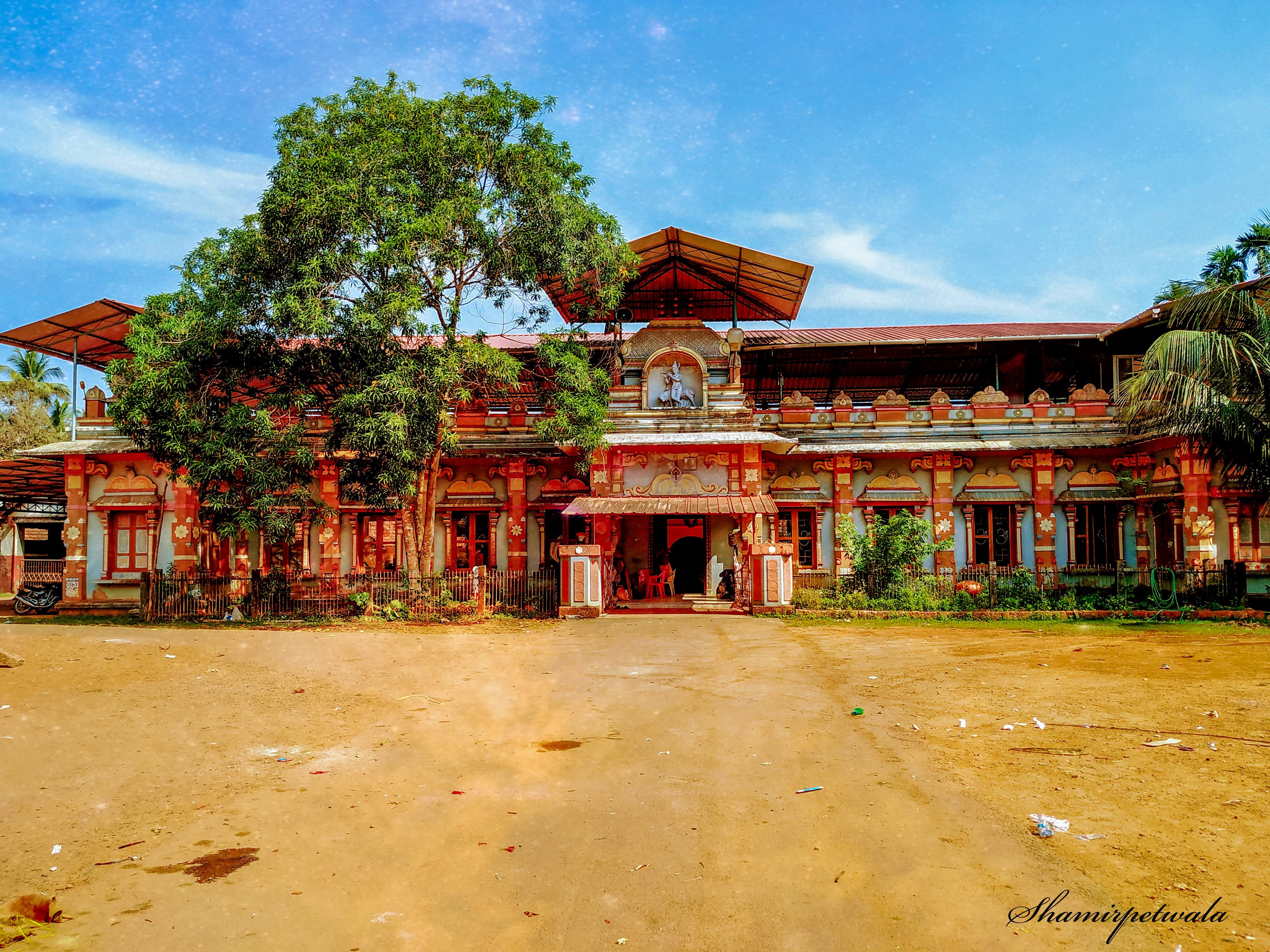
- Hindu monastic institution located in Edaneeru, Kasaragod district, Kerala, India, infamous as the cause célèbre of HH. Keshavanda Bharati v. State of Kerala, a landmark judgement of the Indian Supreme Court.

- Location in Kerala, India
- Coordinates: 12°31′24″N 75°4′26″E
- Country: India
- State: Kerala
- District: Kasaragod

Languages
  - Multilingual: Malayalam, Kannada, Tulu, English
- Time zone: UTC+5:30 (IST)
- PIN: 671541
- Telephone code: +91-4994
- Vehicle registration: KL 14
- Nearest city: Kasaragod
- Lok Sabha constituency: Kasaragod
- Vidhan Sabha constituency: Kasaragod

Edaneeru is a hamlet in the Chengala village of Kasaragod district, Kerala State of India.

== Post Office ==
Edaneeru has a branch post office and pin code is 671541.

== Schools ==
HHSIBSHSS (His Holiness Sri ishwarananda Bharathi Swamiji's Higher Secondary School), Edneer.

Sri Vidhyamandir English Medium School

Government Higher Secondary School, Edneer.

Swamiji's High School, Edneer.

Government Upper Primary School, Edneer.

== Religious Establishments and Temples ==
Shri Edneer Mutt.

Shri Edneer Mutt belongs to the parampara of Sri Thotakacharya, one of the first four disciples of Sri Adi Shankaracharya and follows the Smartha Bhagawatha tradition of Advaitha Pantha, which has more than 1200 years of history of religion, culture, art, music and social service. Srimad Jagadguru Sri Sri Sankaracharya Thotakacharya Keshavananda Bharathi Sripadangalavaru (also known as Edneer Swamiji or Pontiff of Edneer/Kerala Shankaracharya or Shankaracharya of Kerala) is the present head and Guru of Sri Edneer Mutt. He is the only Shankaracharya in the state of Kerala.

Shri Keshavananda Bharathi is also the most referred name in the Indian Constitutional Law.

Edneer Mutt is also one of the important tourist destinations of Kasaragod district, Kerala State of India.

- Shri Vishnumangala Temple

- Sri Khana Vanashasthaveshwara Temple

- Sri Mopala Sri MahaVishnu Temple

== Related Links ==
Edneer Mutt

Sri Kesavananda Bharati

Kesavananda Bharati v. State of Kerala
