= Kesavananda Bharati =

Indian religious leader

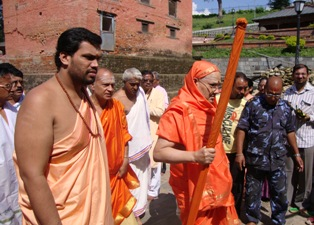
- Bharati visiting Shri Pashupatinath Temple in Kathmandu, Nepal in October 2009

Personal life
- Born: 9 December 1940
- Died: 6 September 2020 (aged 79) Kasaragod, Kerala, India

Religious life
- Religion: Hindu
- Philosophy: Advaita Vedanta
- Sect: Edneer Mutt, Kerala, India

Senior posting
- Teacher: Shri Ishwarananda Bharati Swamiji

Kesavananda Bharati (9 December 1940 – 6 September 2020) was an Indian Hindu monk who served as the head of the Edneer Mutt, a Hindu monastery in Kasaragod district, Kerala, India from 1961 until his death. He was the petitioner in Kesavananda Bharati v. State of Kerala, a landmark case that helped establish the basic structure doctrine of the Indian Constitution which guarantees that the fundamental or 'basic structure' of the Indian Constitution can not be altered by parliamentary amendment. He was a follower of Smartha Bhagawatha tradition and the Advaita Vedanta school of Hindu philosophy.

== Early life and career ==
Kesavananda Bharati was born to Manchthaya Sreedhara Bhatt and Padmavathi Amma in 1940. He was appointed the head of Sri Edneer Mutt, in Kasaragod district, Kerala, in 1961, and belonged to the Parampara of Thotakacharya, one of the first four disciples of Adi Shankara. He was a follower of the Smartha Bhagawatha tradition of Advaitha Pantha. He took Sanyasa at the age of 19 and headed the Edneer Mutt as the Peetadhipathi until his death in 2020. As the head of the Mutt, he was referred by the honorific title, Srimad Jagadguru Sri Sri Sankaracharya Thotakacharya Keshavananda Bharathi Sripadangalavaru.

Kesavananda Bharati was a Carnatic and Hindusthani vocalist, and master of Yakshagana, an Indian art and theater form. He was a patron of education, Kannada culture and arts, including Yakshagana, music and dramas. He supported the use of the Kannada language in the border district of Kasaragod. Under his guidance, the mutt had instituted a Kannada-medium school, an English-medium school, junior college, and a Sanskrit Veda Patashala (English: Vedic School).

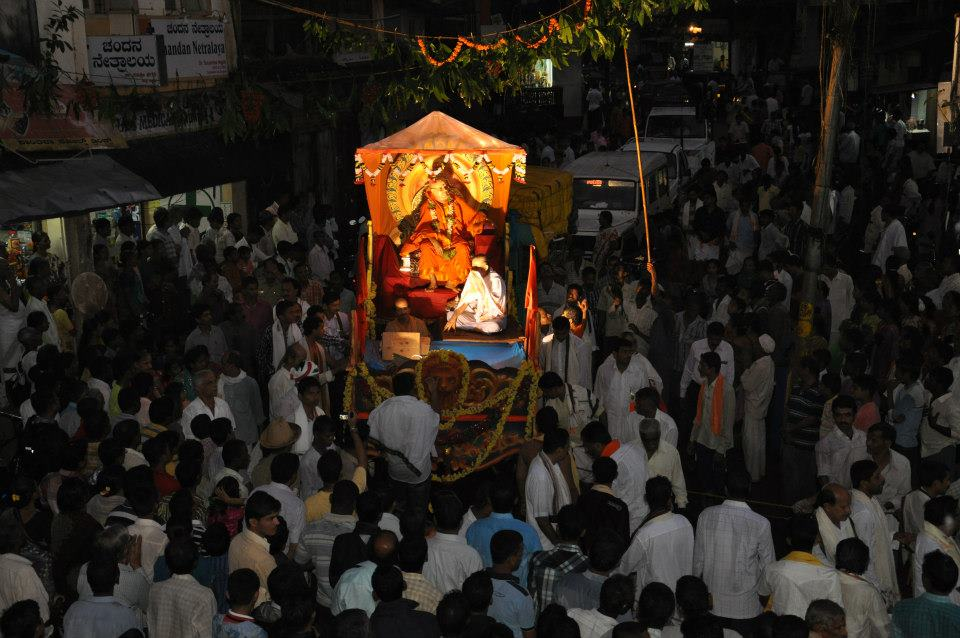
Procession of Swamiji by his disciples in Kumta, 2012

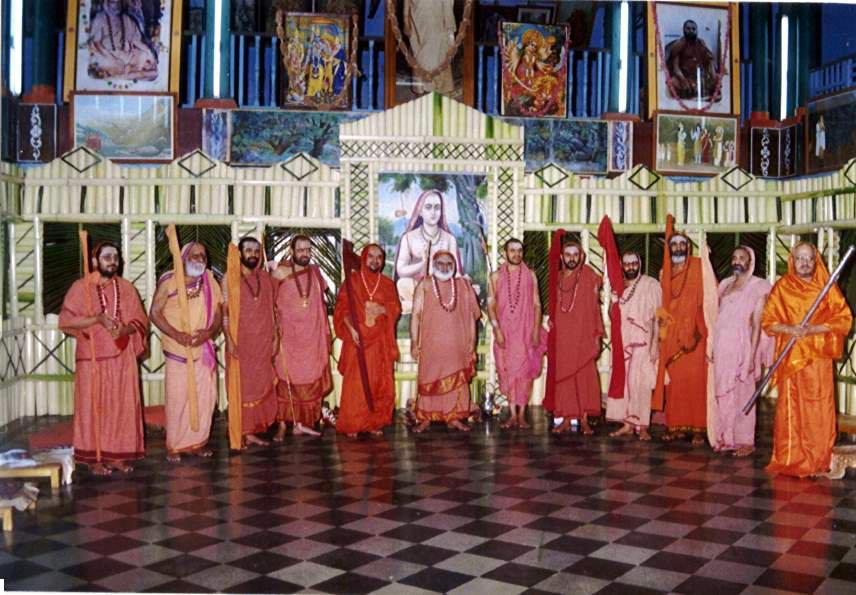
Shri Kesavananda Bharati (far right) with other Shankaracharyas in a regional meet.

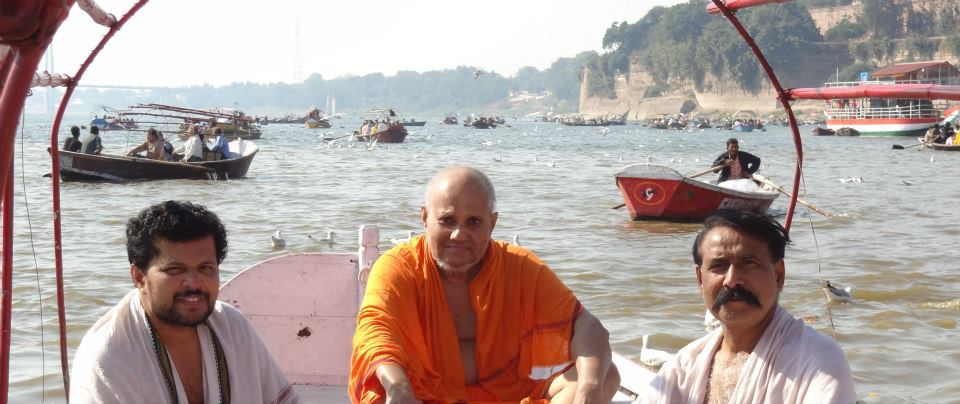
Shri Kesavananda Bharati Swamiji with devotees at Maha Kumbha Mela held at Allahabad in February 2013

== Role in Indian constitutional law ==
Kesavananda Bharati was the petitioner in Kesavananda Bharati v. State of Kerala (case citation: AIR 1973 SC 1461). Kesavananda was a landmark decision of the Supreme Court of India that established the basic structure doctrine of the constitution. The doctrine provides safeguards for the basic structure of the Indian Constitution from parliamentary amendments.

In 1970, Kesavananda Bharati filed a case challenging the Kerala Government's attempts to acquire the Mutt's property, through the Kerala Land Reforms Act of 1963 as amended in 1969. He argued, along with his lawyer Nani Palkhivala, that this action violated his fundamental rights, particularly his fundamental right to religion (Article 25), freedom of religious denomination (Article 26), and right to property (Article 31).

On 23 March 1973, in a 7–6 ruling, the Supreme Court held that Parliament could not alter the "basic structure" of the Constitution of India. This decision formed the basis for the basic structure doctrine that has since guaranteed the fundamental structure of the Indian Constitution. Proponents of the doctrine consider the doctrine to be a major "safety valve" that guards against majoritarianism; while opponents consider it an undemocratic means for the judiciary to check the powers of the legislature.

In April 2013, The Hindu, on Kesvananda's 40th anniversary, noted that the case saved Indian democracy and thanked Shri Kesavananda Bharati and jurist Nanabhoy Palkhivala for the same.

The case was heard by the largest Constitution bench and holds the record for the longest hearing with all 13 judges hearing the case for 68 days.

== Opinion ==
He publicly issued a statement saying that it was a mistake for the government to open the vaults of the Padmanabhaswamy Temple. He stated that all the assets found in the temple's vault were indeed the assets of the temple and the responsibility of managing assets should be handed over to the temple's trust.

Kesavananda Bharti was awarded the Justice V.R. Krishna Iyer Award, in 2018 by the Governor of Kerala.

== Death ==
Kesavananda Bharati died in Kasaragod, Kerala on 6 September 2020 at the age of 79. He died due to Cardiac arrest.
