= Kovalam Assembly constituency =

Constituency of the Kerala legislative assembly in India

Kovalam
- Constituency No. 139 for the Kerala Legislative Assembly
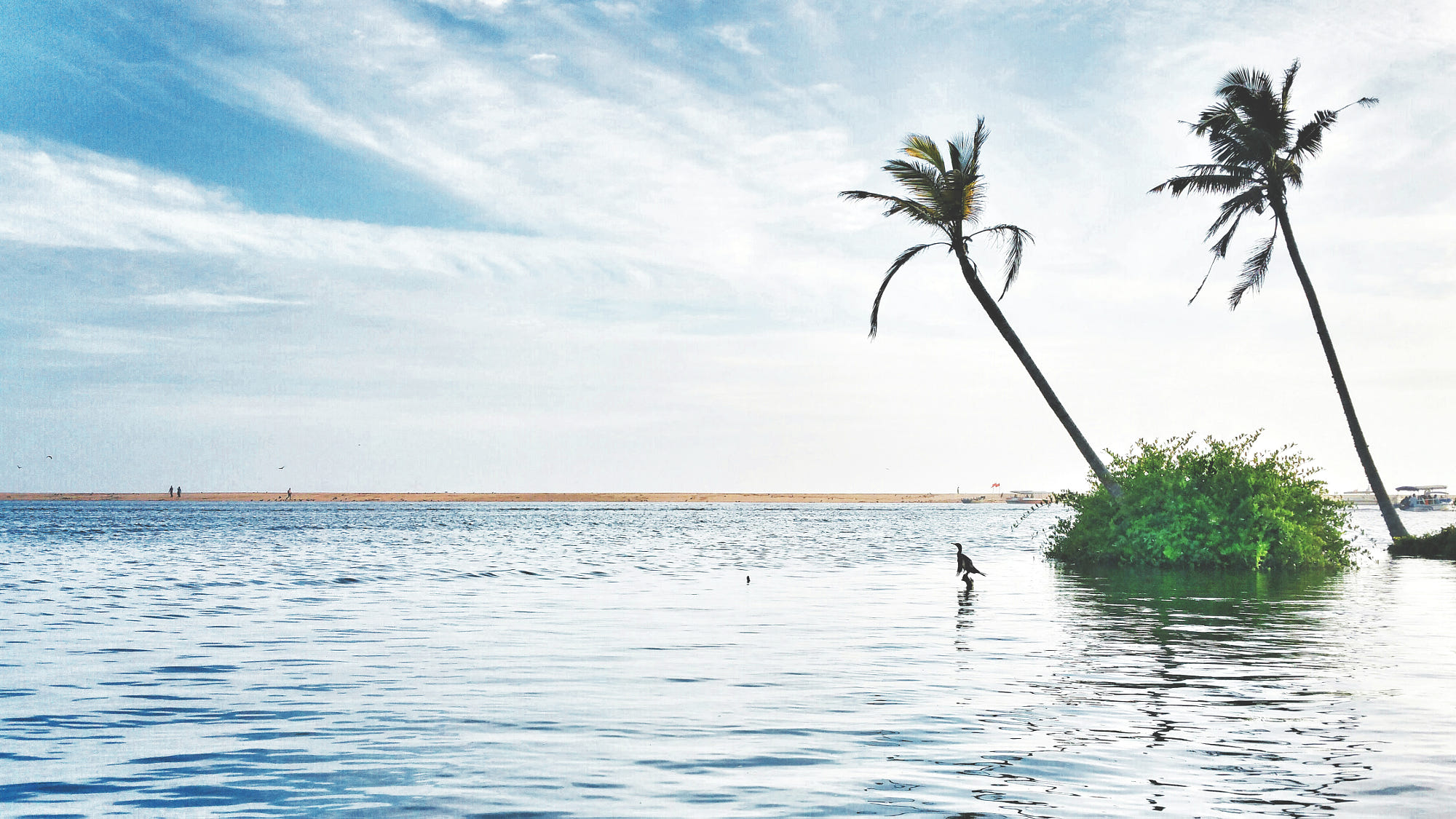
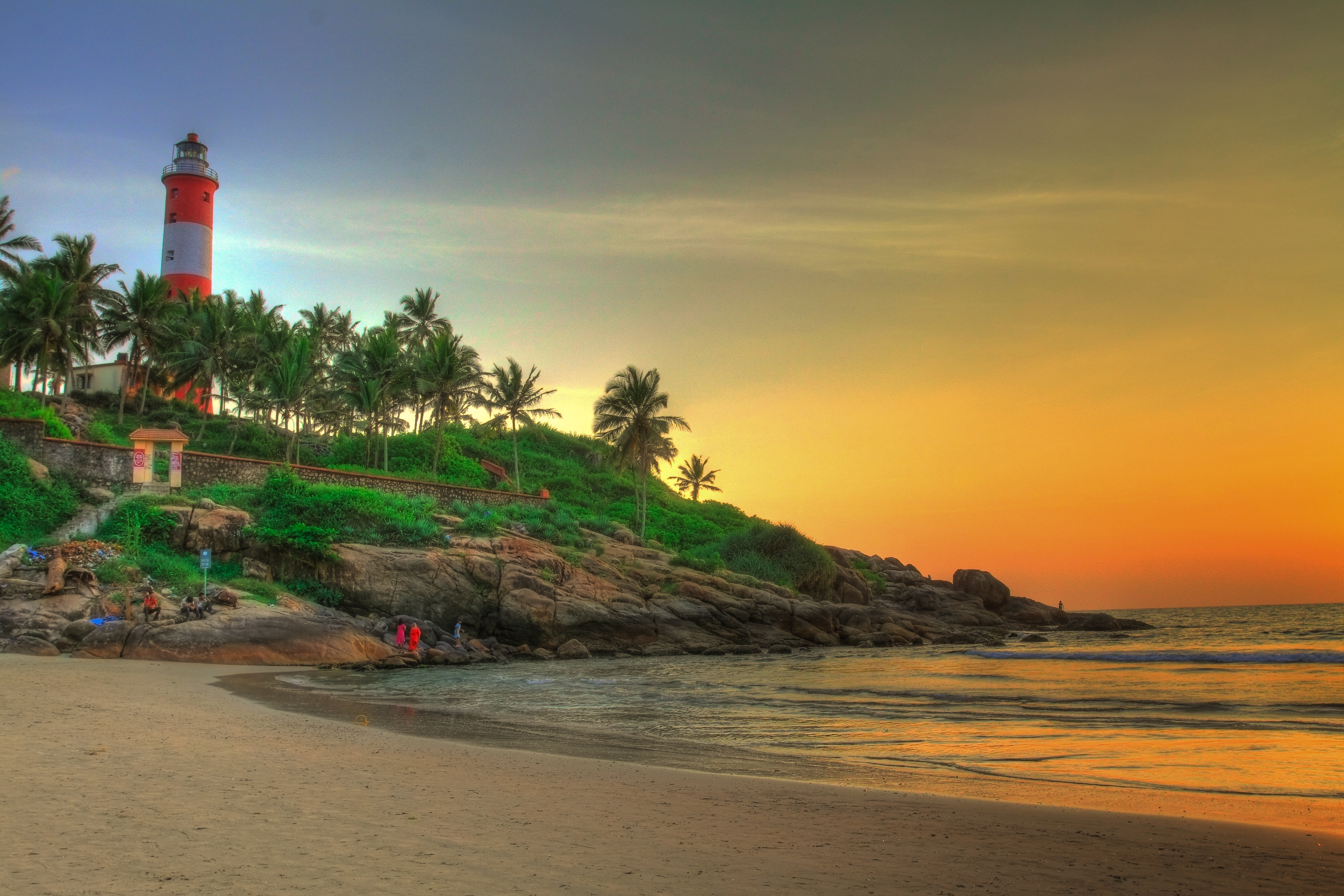
- Top to Bottom: Cruise ship at Vizhinjam Port, Poovar Beach, Kovalam Lighthouse

Constituency details
- Country: India
- Region: South India
- State: Kerala
- District: Thiruvananthapuram
- Established: 1965
- Total electors: 2,18,656 (2021)
- Reservation: None

Member of Legislative Assembly
- 16th Kerala Legislative Assembly
- Incumbent M. Vincent
- Party: INC
- Alliance: UDF
- Elected year: 2026

Kovalam is one of the 140 state legislative assembly constituencies in Kerala in southern India. It is also one of the seven state legislative assembly constituencies included in Thiruvananthapuram Lok Sabha constituency. As of the 2026 Assembly elections, the current MLA is M. Vincent of INC. It includes 5 wards of Thiruvanathapuram muncipal corporation (Vizhinjam zone), Kalliyoor and Venganoor panchayath from Thiruvanathapuram taluk and Balaramapuram, Kanjiramkulam, Karumkulam, Poovar, Kottukal panchayats from Neyyattinkara taluk.

== Members of the Legislative Assembly ==
Election	Member	Party
1967	J. C. Moraes	Independent
1970	M. Kunjukrishnan Nadar	Independent
1977	A. Neelalohitadasan Nadar	Independent
1980	M. R. Raghu Chandra Bal	Indian National Congress
1982	N. Shakthan Nadar	Independent
1987	Neelalohithadasan Nadar	Lok Dal
1991	Neelalohithadasan Nadar	Janata Dal
1996	Neelalohithadasan Nadar	Janata Dal
2001	Neelalohithadasan Nadar	Janata Dal (Secular)
2006	George Mercier	Indian National Congress
2011	Jameela Prakasham	Janata Dal
2016	M. Vincent	Indian National Congress
2021	M. Vincent	Indian National Congress
2026	M. Vincent	Indian National Congress

== Election results ==
Percentage change (±%) denotes the change in the number of votes from the immediate previous election.

=== 2026 ===
2026 Kerala Legislative Assembly election: Kovalam
Party	Candidate	Votes	%	±%
INC	M. Vincent	79,661	51.32	▲4.26
LDF	Bhagath Rufus	46,952	30.23	
BJP	T. N. Suresh	25,380	16.35	
NOTA	None of the above	976	0.63	▲0.14
Margin of victory		32,709	21.07	▲13.80
Turnout		1,55,237		
INC hold		Swing		

=== 2021 ===
There were 2,18,656 registered voters in the constituency for the 2021 Kerala Assembly election.

2021 Kerala Legislative Assembly election: Kovalam
Party	Candidate	Votes	%	±%
INC	M. Vincent	74,868	47.06	▲7.92
JD(S)	Neelalohitadasan Nadar	63,306	39.79	▲2.34
KKC	Vishupuram Chandrasekharan	18,664	11.73	
NOTA	None of the above	773	0.49	
BSP	K. R. Anish	641	0.40	▼0.25
Independent	V. S. Prince	417	0.26	
Independent	Venganoor Asokan	284	0.18	
Independent	R. I. Ajil	147	0.09	
Margin of victory		11,562	7.27	▲5.58
Turnout		1,59,100	72.76	▼1.47
INC hold		Swing		

=== 2016 ===
There were 2,07,410 registered voters in the constituency for the 2016 Kerala Assembly election.

2016 Kerala Legislative Assembly election: Kovalam
Party	Candidate	Votes	%	±%
INC	M. Vincent	60,268	39.14	▼2.70
JD(S)	Jameela Prakasham	57,653	37.45	▼10.15
BDJS	Kovalam T. N. Suresh	30,987	20.13	
BSP	K. R. Anish	996	0.65	▼0.28
Independent	M. C. Jayalal	933	0.61	
NOTA	None of the above	845	0.55	
Independent	Pramod Kumar	564	0.37	
IGP	Sarasamma T.	558	0.36	
Margin of victory		2,615	1.69	▼4.07
Turnout		1,53,966	74.23	▲5.15
INC gain from JD(S)		Swing		

=== 2011 ===
There were 1,83,616 registered voters in the constituency for the 2011 election.

2011 Kerala Legislative Assembly election: Kovalam
Party	Candidate	Votes	%	±%
JD(S)	Jameela Prakasham	59,510	47.60	
INC	George Mercier	52,305	41.84	
BJP	Venganoor Satheesh	9,127	7.30	
Independent	Thanka Bai T.	1,231	0.98	
SDPI	A. M. Nizam	1,193	0.95	
BSP	Muraleedharan	1,157	0.93	
Margin of victory		7,205	5.76	
Turnout		1,25,008	68.08	
JD(S) gain from INC		Swing		

== See also ==
- Kovalam
- Thiruvananthapuram district
- List of constituencies of the Kerala Legislative Assembly
- 2016 Kerala Legislative Assembly election
