= Kerala Kamaraj Congress =

Kerala Kamaraj Congress കേരള കാമരാജ് കോൺഗ്രസ്
- Abbreviation: KKC
- Leader: Vishnupuram Chandrasekharan
- Founded: 25 October 2016; 9 years ago
- Headquarters: Thiruvananthapuram
- Alliance: NDA (Kerala); (2016–present)
- Seats in Rajya Sabha: 0 / 245
- Seats in Lok Sabha: 0 / 543
- Seats in Kerala Legislative Assembly: 0 / 140
- Number of states and union territories in government: 0 / 31

Party flag
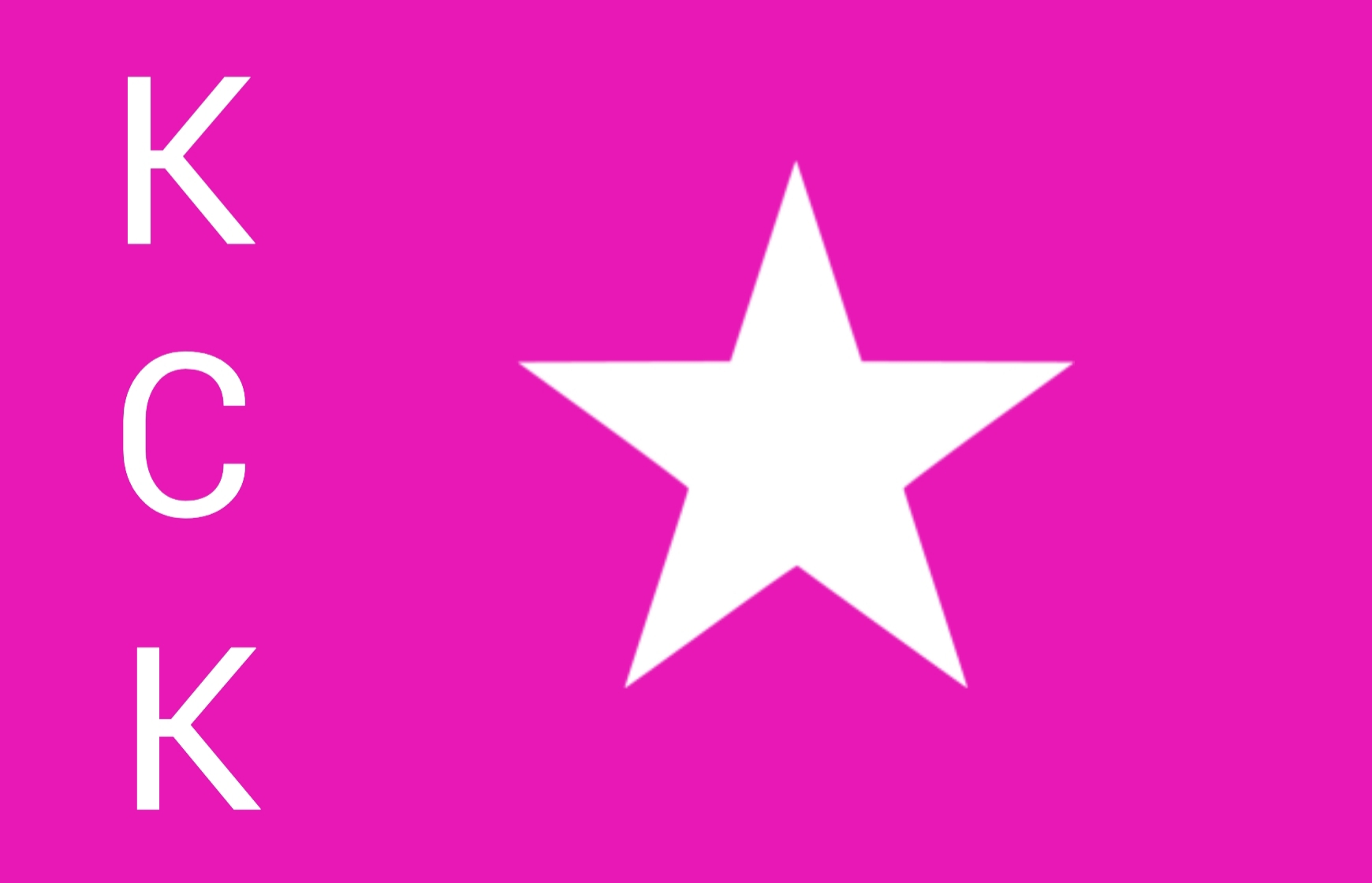

Kerala Kamaraj Congress is a political party led by Vishnupuram Chandrasekharan that was founded on 25 October 2016 in the Indian state of Kerala.

== History ==
Kerala Kamaraj Congress is a part of India ruling NDA alliance led by BJP. Vishnupuram Chandrasekharan is contesting under NDA from Kovalam constituency in 2021. Splinter groups of Kerala Kamaraj Congress was left and joined to Left Democratic Front before the 2021 Kerala Legislative Assembly election.

== Electoral performance ==
Kerala Legislative Assembly election results
Election Year	Alliance	Seats contested	Seats won	Total Votes	Percentage of votes	+/- Vote
2021	NDA	1	0 / 140	18,664	0.09%	New
