= M. Vincent =

Indian politician

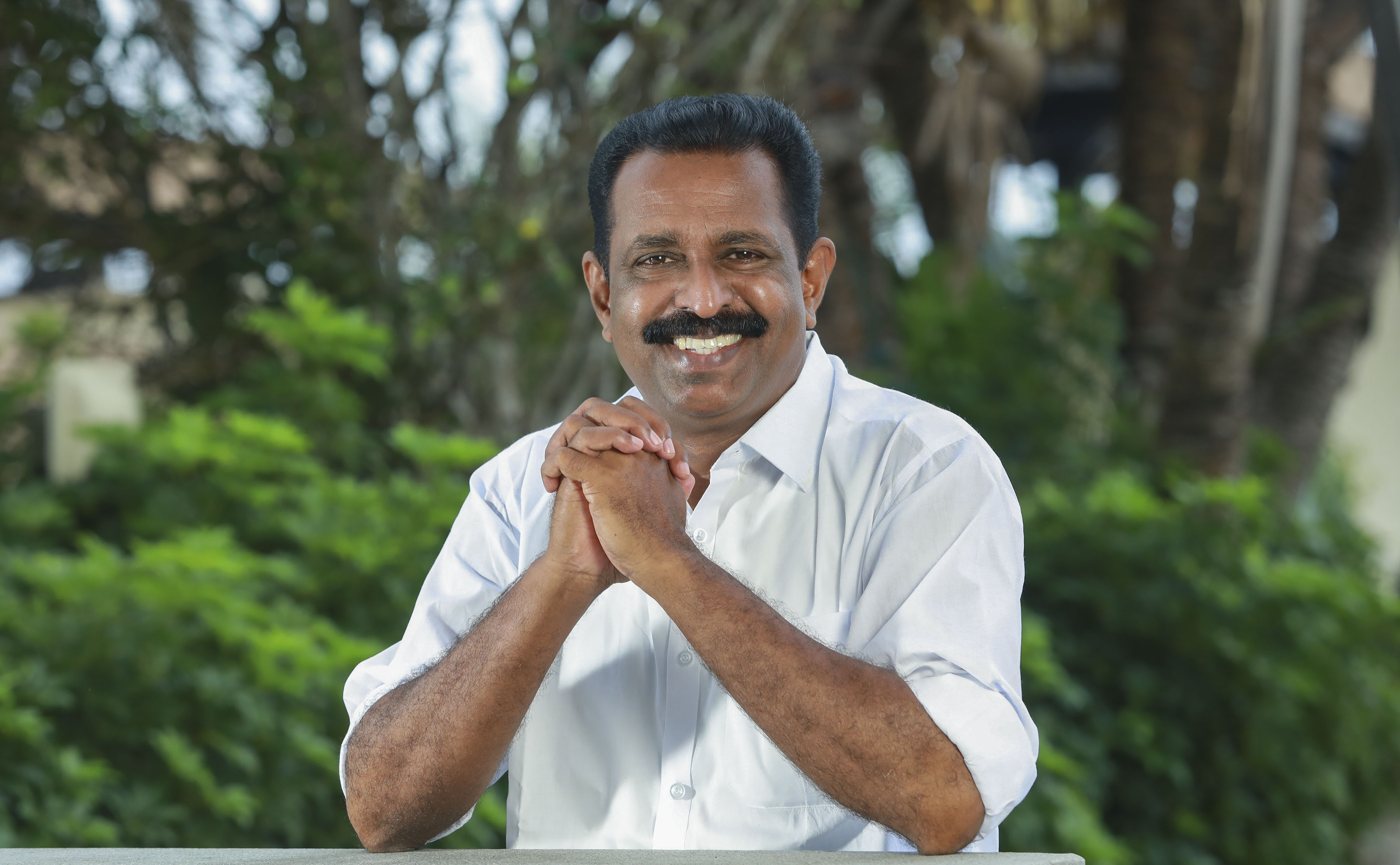

Member of the Kerala Legislative Assembly
- Incumbent
- Assumed office 2 June 2016
- Preceded by: Jameela Prakasam
- Constituency: Kovalam

Personal details
- Born: 31 May 1969 (age 57)
- Party: Indian National Congress
- Spouse: Subha Vincent (m. 2002)
- Children: 3
- Education: Bachelor of Arts in Economics; Bachelor of Laws
- Alma mater: Christian College, Kattakada; Kerala Law Academy Law College, Thiruvananthapuram

Michaelpillai Vincent (മൈക്കിൾപ്പിള്ളൈ വിൻസെന്റ്) (born 31 May 1969) is an Indian politician from Thiruvananthapuram, Kerala. He is a member of the Kerala Legislative Assembly and Indian National Congress. Vincent represents the Kovalam constituency.

== Education ==
M. Vincent has a degree from Kerala Law Academy Law College, Thiruvananthapuram. Prior to that he had completed his Bachelor of Arts in Economics from Christian College, Kattakada.

== Political career ==
His first foray into politics was as a student of 8th grade in 1982 and 10th grade in 1984 as class leader in HSS, Balaramapuram which led to the first political position in the year 1994 as the Unit Secretary of Kerala Students Union. In the year 1995, he became the Taluk General Secretary of KSU and later in 1996 he was the KSU Thiruvananthapuram district General Secretary and was chosen as the member of Nemom Block Panchayat simultaneously.

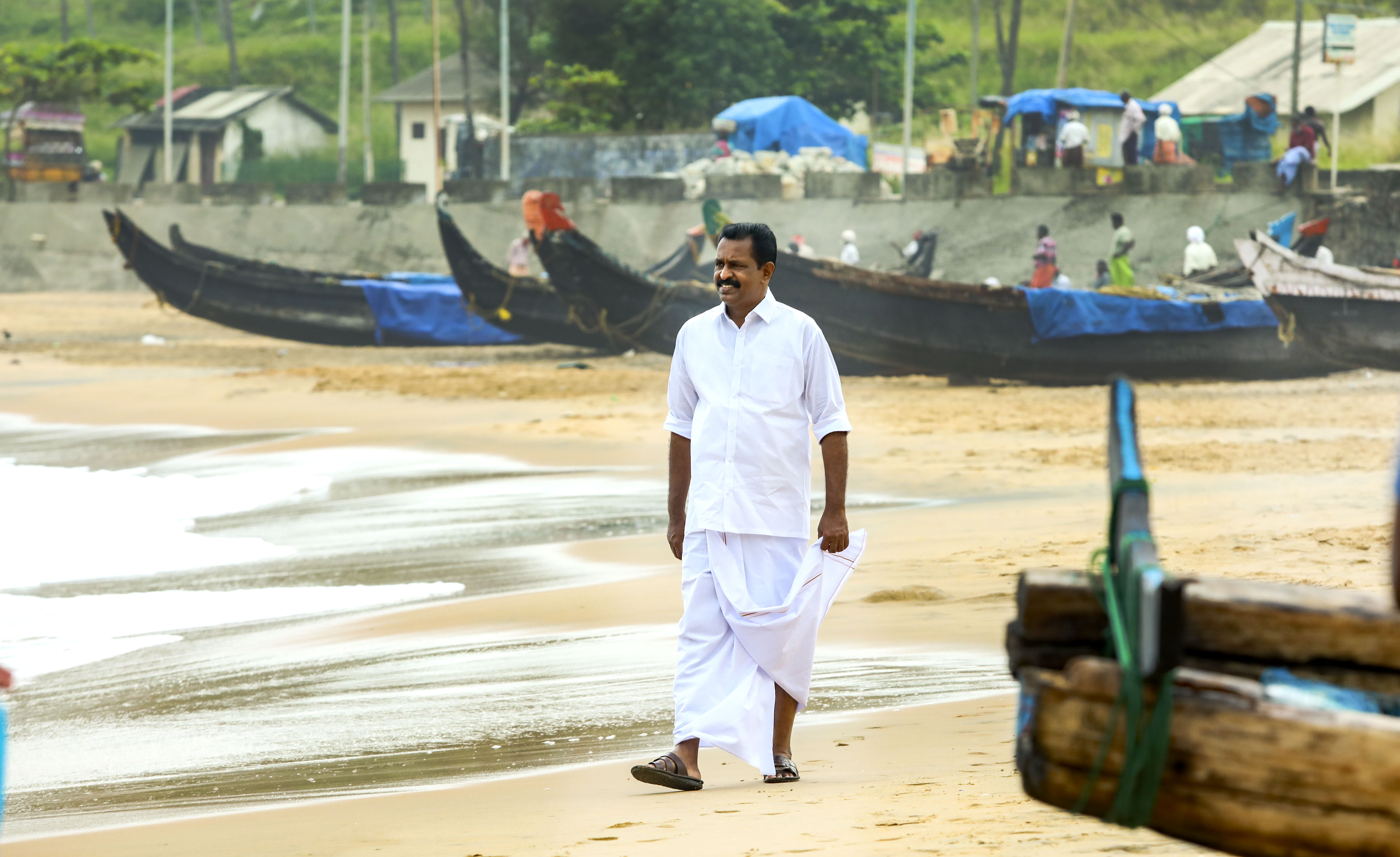
M. Vincent MLA

In 2002, M. Vincent was elected as the Indian Youth Congress State General Secretary. Later in October, 2008 he was selected as the Thiruvananthapuram District D.C.C General Secretary. In December, 2012 Vincent became the KPCC Secretary.

M. Vincent was elected as the MLA of Kovalam constituency in 2016 with 60,268 votes. Since December 2017, he is the General Council Member of Agricultural University and also a senate member of the University of Kerala from December 2018.

== Achievements ==
M Vincent has accomplished a lot within 5 years of his term as the MLA of Kovalam Constituency. Within the 5-year time frame, he has risen to the needs of his people with MLA's fund. Roads were constructed for Rs.8.06 crores, high mast and mini-mast lights placed for Rs. 3.45 crores, various projects for drinking water facilities were conducted for Rs.79 lakhs, waiting sheds were built for Rs.71 lakhs, ambulances were provided for all the panchayats and PHC's for Rs.92 lakhs, ponds were renovated for Rs.24.60 lakhs, donations were provided for a lot of dairy co-operative societies for Rs.4.48 lakhs, welfare of fishermen was met for Rs. 8 crores, hospitals were renovated for Rs.90 crores. MLA's fund has also met the needs of various schools as he has donated school buses for Rs.1.89 crores, kitchens were for Rs.98 lakhs, restrooms were constructed for Rs.76 lakhs, smart classrooms and computer labs were built for Rs.25.82 lakhs, buildings for schools and anganwadis were established for Rs. 1.87 crores.

M Vincent is also actively helping the Balarampuram handloom workers gain better visibility across the world.

== Personal life ==
M. Vincent was born to Michael Pillai and Phillis. He married Subha Vincent on 28 October 2002 and has three children – Adithyan, Abhijith, and Aadhy. Apart from politics, he is passionate about cricket and reading.
