= Neelalohithadasan Nadar =

Indian politician

A. Neelalohithadasan Nadar

Minister of forest and transport, Government of Kerala
- In office 20th January 1999 - 13 January 2000
- Preceded by: P. R. Kurup
- Succeeded by: C. K. Nanu

Minister of Law, electricity, irrigation, labour, housing, Government of Kerala
- In office 16 November 1979 - 1 December 1979

Minister of youth affairs and Sports, Government of Kerala
- In office 2 April 1987 - 17 June 1991

Personal details
- Born: 28 August 1947 (age 78)
- Spouse: Jameela Prakasam
- Occupation: Politician

A. Neelalohithadasan Nadar is a politician from Kerala state of India and has been minister of various departments throughout his career.

== Career ==
Nadar was a member of Lok Sabha from Thiruvananthapuram Constituency in 1980. He was served as minister for 3 times. He became minister for Labour and Housing in CH Mohammed Koya ministry. He served as Sports and Youth Minister from 1987 to 1991 in EK Nayanar Ministry. Later he also was minister of Forest and Transportation from 1999 to 2000.in 3rd Nayanar ministry.

He was the president of the Kerala Janata Dal (Secular) unit.

== Cases ==
Nadar has been accused and convicted of sexual assault against women. In 1999 he assaulted forest officer Prakriti Srivastava and in 2000 assaulted IAS and chief electoral officer of Kerala Nalini Netto. He was pronounced guilty by the magisterial court of Kozhikode in 2004 but was later acquitted in 2008 by another fast track court. A fast track court acquitted former transport minister and Janata Dal Secular state president Neelalohithadasan Nadar in a case of alleged sexual harassment of a senior IAS officer when Nadar was a member of the LDF cabinet in 1999.

Fast Track Sessions Judge M R Anitha discharged Nadar on the grounds that the prosecution had not been able to prove the charges against the accused.

The case against Nadar was that he had attempted to outrage the modesty of Nalini Netto, who was transport secretary then, after she was called to his room in the assembly complex to discuss official matters.

Netto's revelation of the alleged humiliation she underwent had kicked off a political storm, ultimately paving the way for Nadar's exit from the E K Nayanar ministry, in which he was the lone Janata Dal(S) member.

Nadar later quit JD (S) and joined the BSP last year, heading the state unit of the party. Now Nadar is the state president of Janata Dal secular Kerala.

Reacting to the judgement, Nadar said the court decision vindicated his stand that the allegations against him were fabricated.

Now Nadar is the state president of Janata Dal.

== Personal life ==
Nadar was born as the son of Shri. K.P. Appi Nadar and Smt. A. Kunjulekshmy on 28 August 1947. A Law graduate, he holds a Doctorate in Hindi as well.

Taking an active interest in political affairs even during his student days, he joined Indian National Congress in 1964, became the KSU District Secretary in 1967-68 and later its president. He was Member of State Youth Congress Committee in 1968 and became its president in 1969. Besides, he was a member of KPCC and AICC. He also served as chairman, Kerala University Union in 1972.

During the emergency period he left INC and associated in the formation of the Congress For Democracy and became its State President. Subsequently, he joined the Janata Party when the Congress For Democracy merged with the Janata Party. Later, he became the Parliamentary Party Leader and State Chairman of DSP. When the name of DSP was changed as Lok Dal, he became a member of the National Standing Committee and also State President.

Nadar was elected to the Kerala Legislative Assembly for the first time in 1977 from Kovalam constituency. Again he was elected to Kerala Legislative Assembly in 1987, 1996 and 2001 from the same constituency. He was elected to the Kerala Legislative Assembly in 1991 too from Kovalam; however the election was declared void by the Kerala High Court on 11-12-1991.

Nadar held the portfolio of Law, Electricity, Irrigation, Labour and Housing in the C.H. Mohammed Koya Ministry from 16-11-1979 to 1-12-1979. He also held the Office of the Minister for Sports and Youth Affairs in the E.K. Nayanar Ministry from 2-4-1987 to 17-6-1991 and the Minister for Forests and Transport in Nayanar Ministry from 20-1-1999 to 13-2-2000.

Nadar also had a remarkable stint as Member of Lok Sabha from 1980 to 1984. Also as the founder of "Kamaraj Foundation of India “ in 1976, he worked as its chairman and was Member of State Library Council too. He worked as Manager, Printer and Publisher of the monthly "Yagadeepam". He started "Gandhian Balakendras" in 1987 and worked as its Chief Patron. The Kerala Pradesh Congress Committee president Shri Mullapally Ramachandran has openly accused him of funding Fascist activities in India.

He has been the Janatha Dal Legislature Party leader besides being a Member of Janatha Dal National Executive Committee. Earlier, he was also its State Secretary General, till 1999.

Now he is the state president of Janata Dal (Secular) Kerala Unit.

Nadar is married to Jameela Prakasam, who is also a politician from Janata Dal (Secular) party and is a Member of the Kerala Legislative Assembly since her win in 2011 election. They have two daughters. His elder daughter Deepthi is working in Secretariat and his younger daughter Divya, who was a young scientist working for Vikram Sarabhai Space Centre (VSSC), committed suicide on 29 August 2010.
