= Kovalam =

Beach and seaside resort in Thiruvananthapuram, Kerala

- Locality
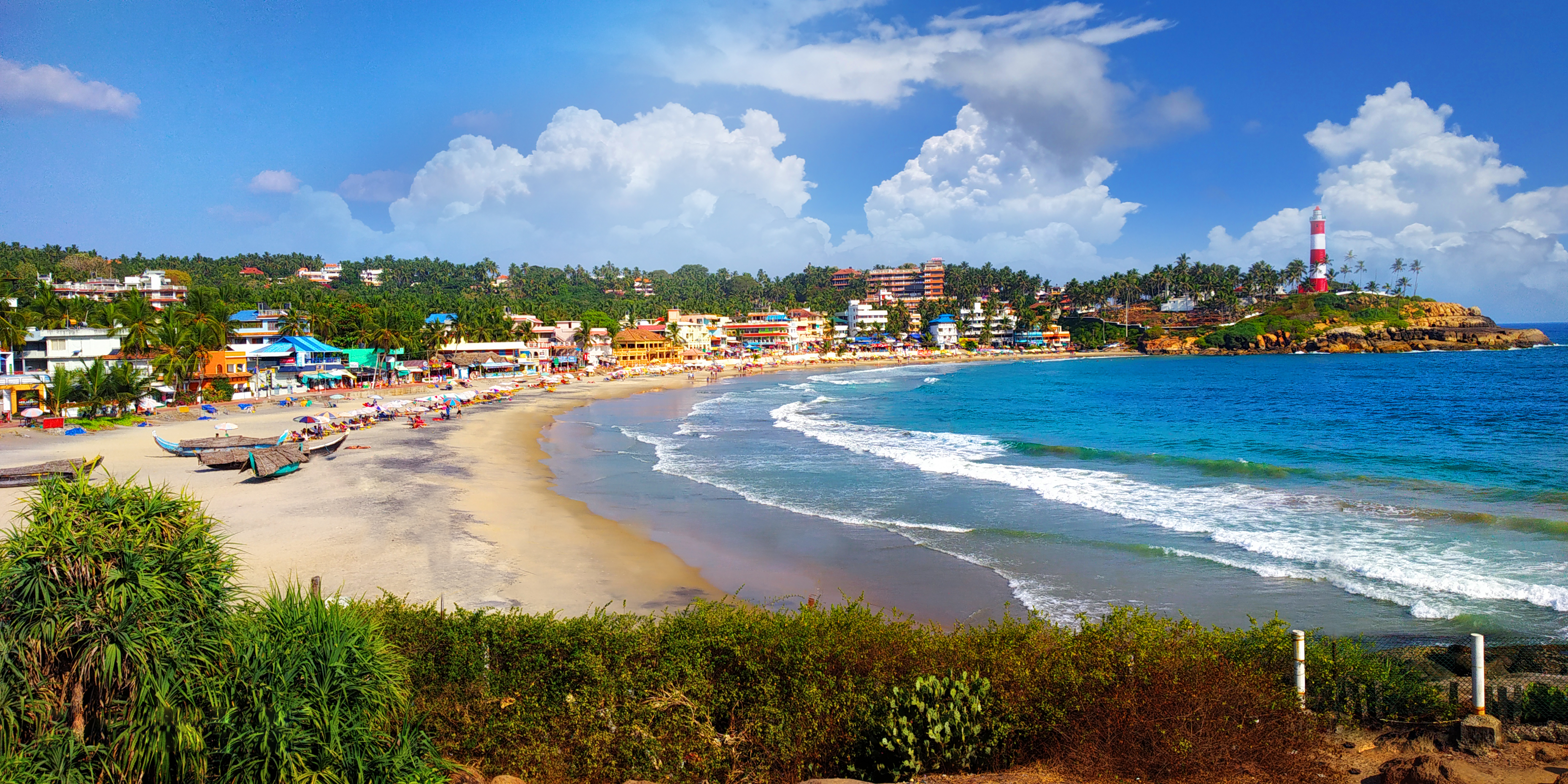
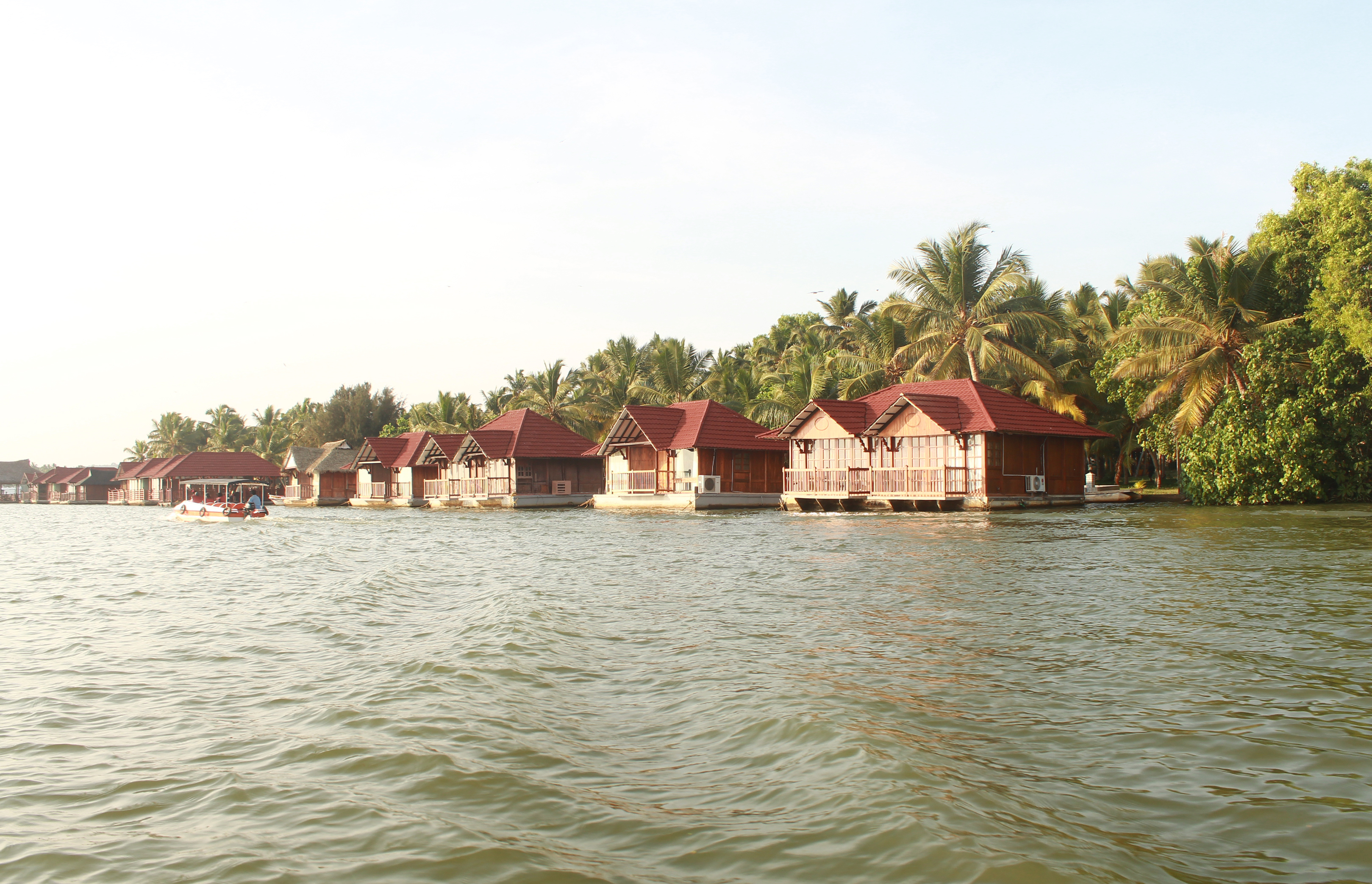
- A beach in Kovalam with Vizhinjam Lighthouse in the vicinity Accommodations on the Karamana River

- Location within Kerala Location within India
- Coordinates: 8.4004°N 76.9787°E
- Country: India
- State: Kerala
- District: Thiruvananthapuram district

Government
  - Type: Municipal Corporation
  - Body: Corporation of Thiruvananthapuram

Languages
  - Official: Malayalam, English
- Time zone: UTC+5:30 (IST)
- Postal code: 695527

Kovalam (Malayalam: [koːʋɐɭɐm]) is a beach and seaside resort in the city of Thiruvananthapuram in Kerala, India. Kovalam is located 12.6 km (7.8 mi) southeast of the city center. The beaches around Kovalam are popular vacation destinations for both domestic and international travellers.

== Etymology ==
Kovalam means "coconut grove", after the coconut trees which are common there.

== History ==
Kovalam first received attention when the Regent Maharani Sethu Lakshmi Bayi of Travancore constructed her beach resort, Halcyon Castle, here towards the end of the 1920s. Thereafter, the place was brought to the public eye by her nephew, the Maharaja of Travancore. The European guests of the then Travancore kingdom discovered the potential of Kovalam beach as a tourist destination in the 1930s. In the early 1970s, many hippies came on their way to Ceylon via the hippie trail, beginning the transformation of a casual fishing village in Kerala into a significant tourist destination.

== Geography ==
=== Beaches ===
Kovalam has three beaches separated by rocky outcroppings in its 17 km coastline, the three together form the crescent of the Kovalam beach.

- Lighthouse Beach – the southernmost beach, the Lighthouse Beach, is named after the 118 feet (36 m) Vizhinjam Lighthouse located on top of the Kurumkal hillock.
- Hawah Beach – also known as Eve's Beach, consists of a high rock promontory and a bay, and is used by local fishermen.
- Samudra Beach – separated from the Lighthouse Beach by a large promontory, it is also used by local fishermen.
- Ashoka Beach – sea-wall to see the sea above the rocks and swimmable shallow waters

=== Tourist facilities ===
Kovalam was among the most prominent tourist spots in India during the hippie era. It still has a high status among tourists, who arrive mostly from Europe and Israel. Kovalam is finding a new significance in the light of several Ayurvedic salons, and recuperation and regeneration resorts which provide a wide variety of Ayurvedic treatments for tourists. One of the first hotels to open there was the Kovalam Beach Resort, which was designed by Charles Correa from 1969 to 1974.

=== Transport ===
The nearest train station is Thiruvananthapuram Central railway station, about 16 km (9.94 mi) away. The nearest airport is Thiruvananthapuram International Airport, about 10 km (6.21 mi) away.

== Politics ==
Kovalam assembly constituency is part of the Thiruvananthapuram Lok Sabha constituency. In the 2016 Kerala Assembly elections, M Vincent of the Indian National Congress defeated the incumbent Jameela Prakasham by over 2,500 votes.

== Thiruvananthapuram International Cruise Terminal ==
Vizhinjam's location, with its proximity to beaches, historical sites, and cultural attractions, is a base for exploring Kerala's heritage. Visitors can take tours to nearby destinations such as Kovalam, Thiruvananthapuram, and the Padmanabhaswamy Temple.

The Vizhinjam Cruise Terminal is currently under construction by Adani Ports.

== Gallery ==
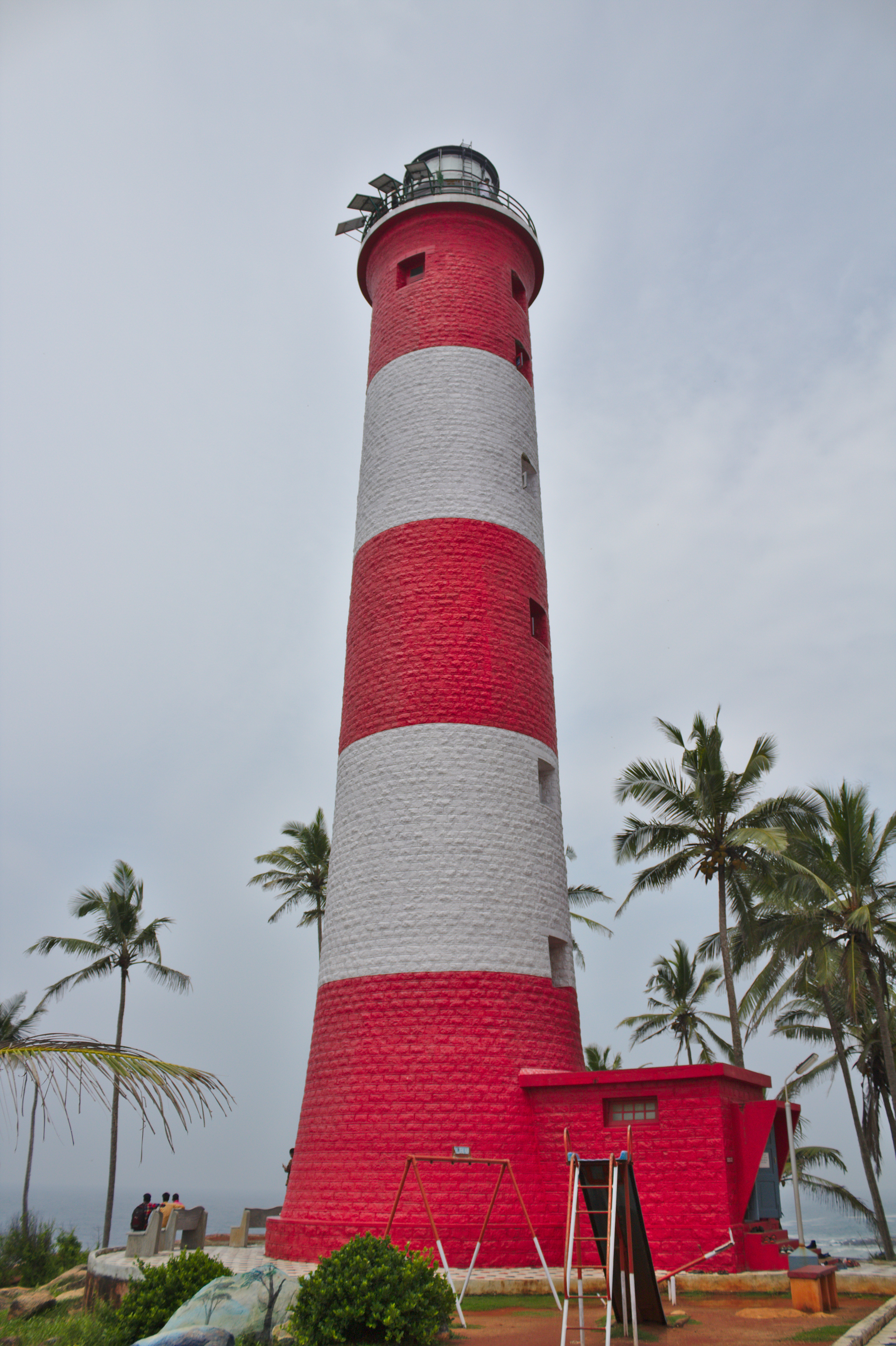
Kovalam Light House

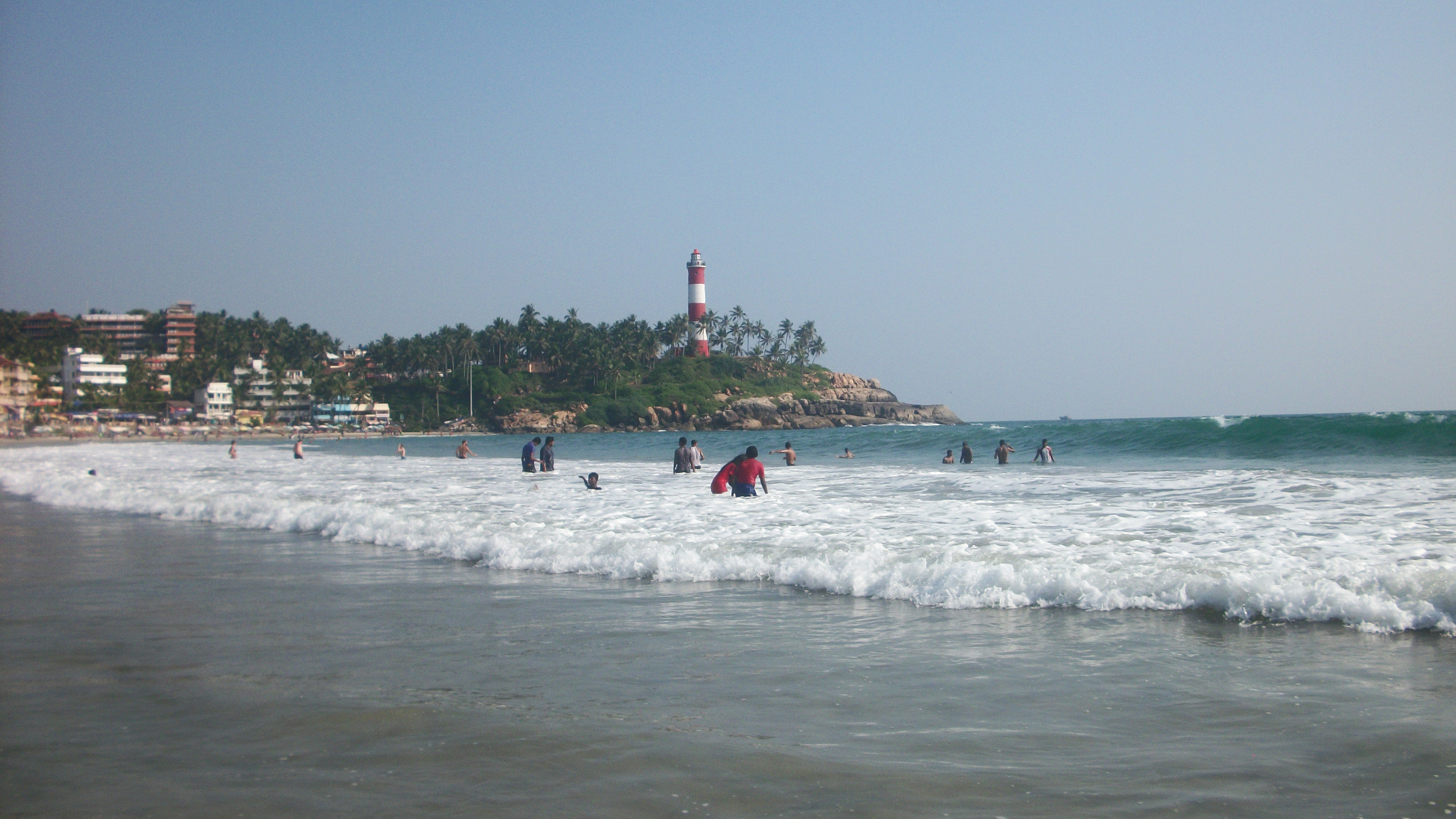
Kovalam Light House beach

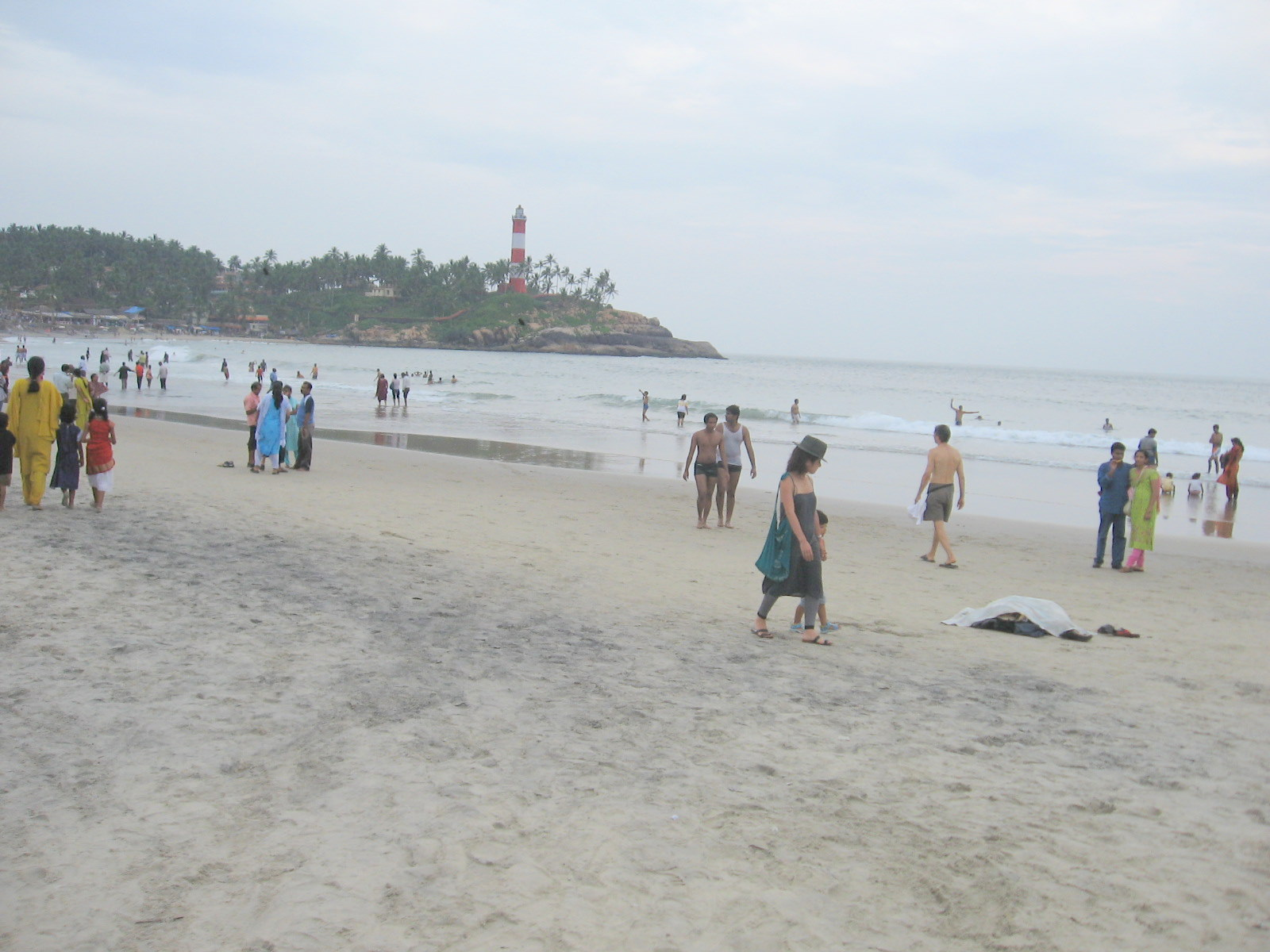
Lighthouse beach

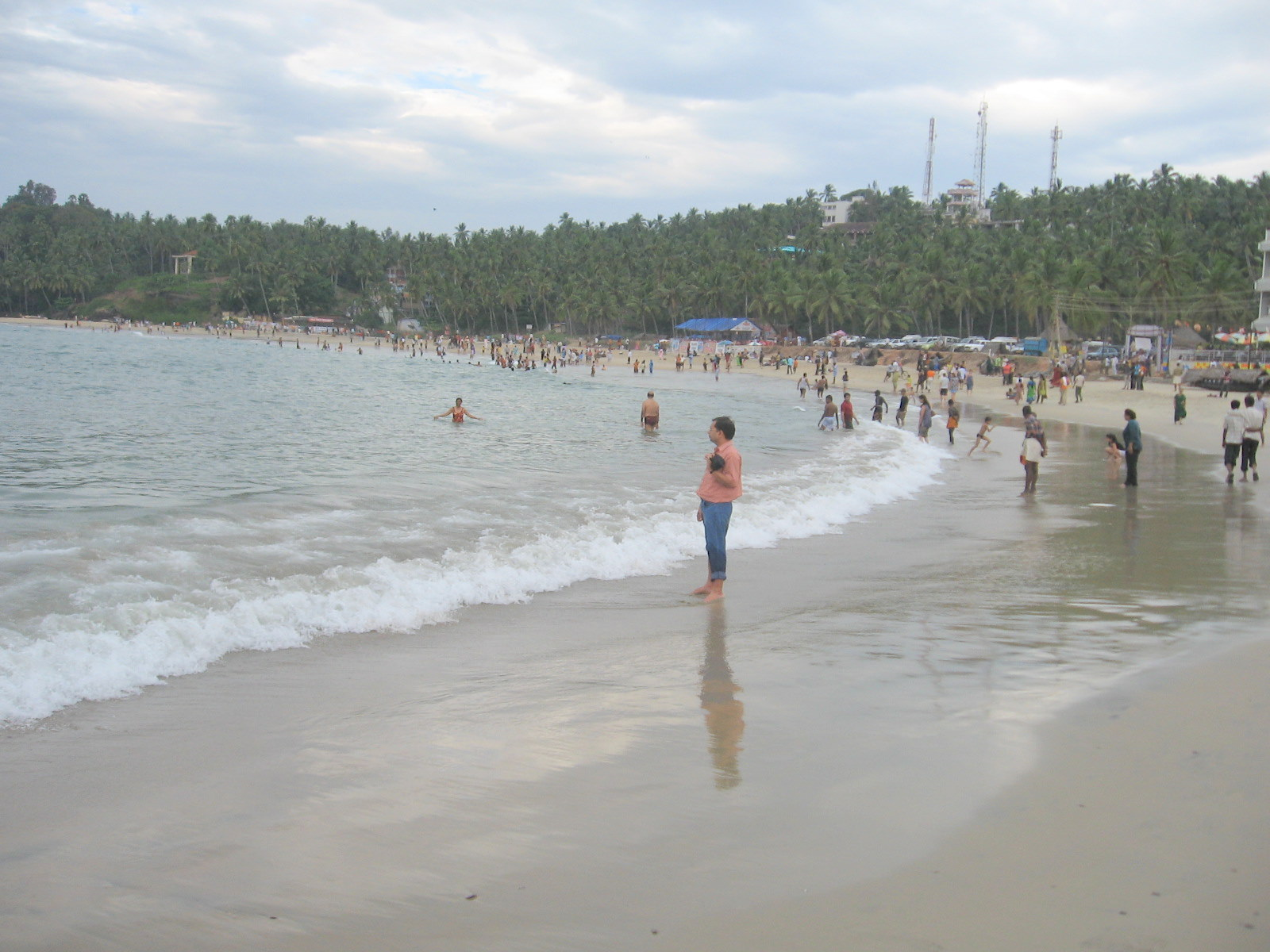
Hawwah beach (Eves beach)

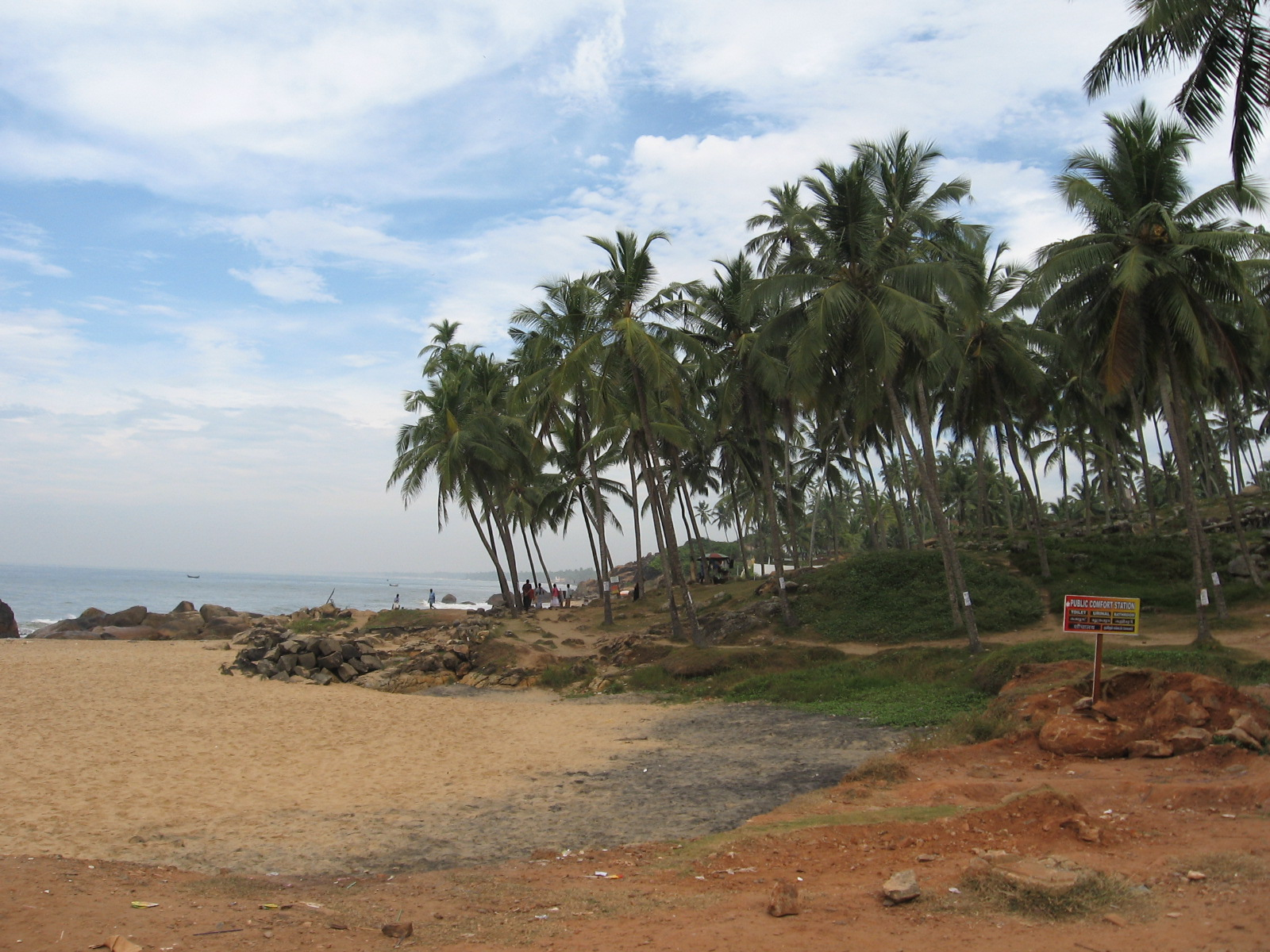
Samudra beach

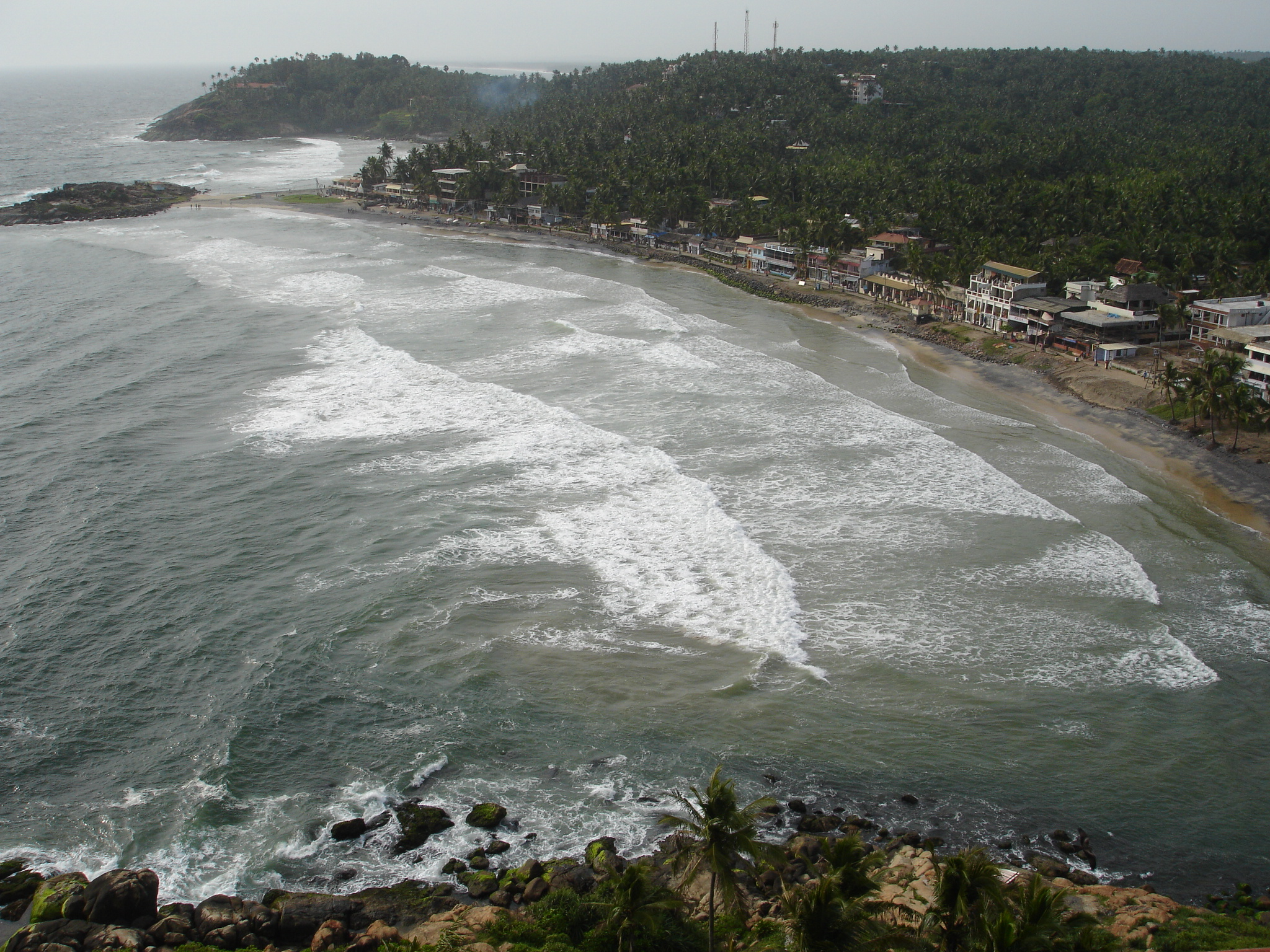
Kovalam beach – view from lighthouse

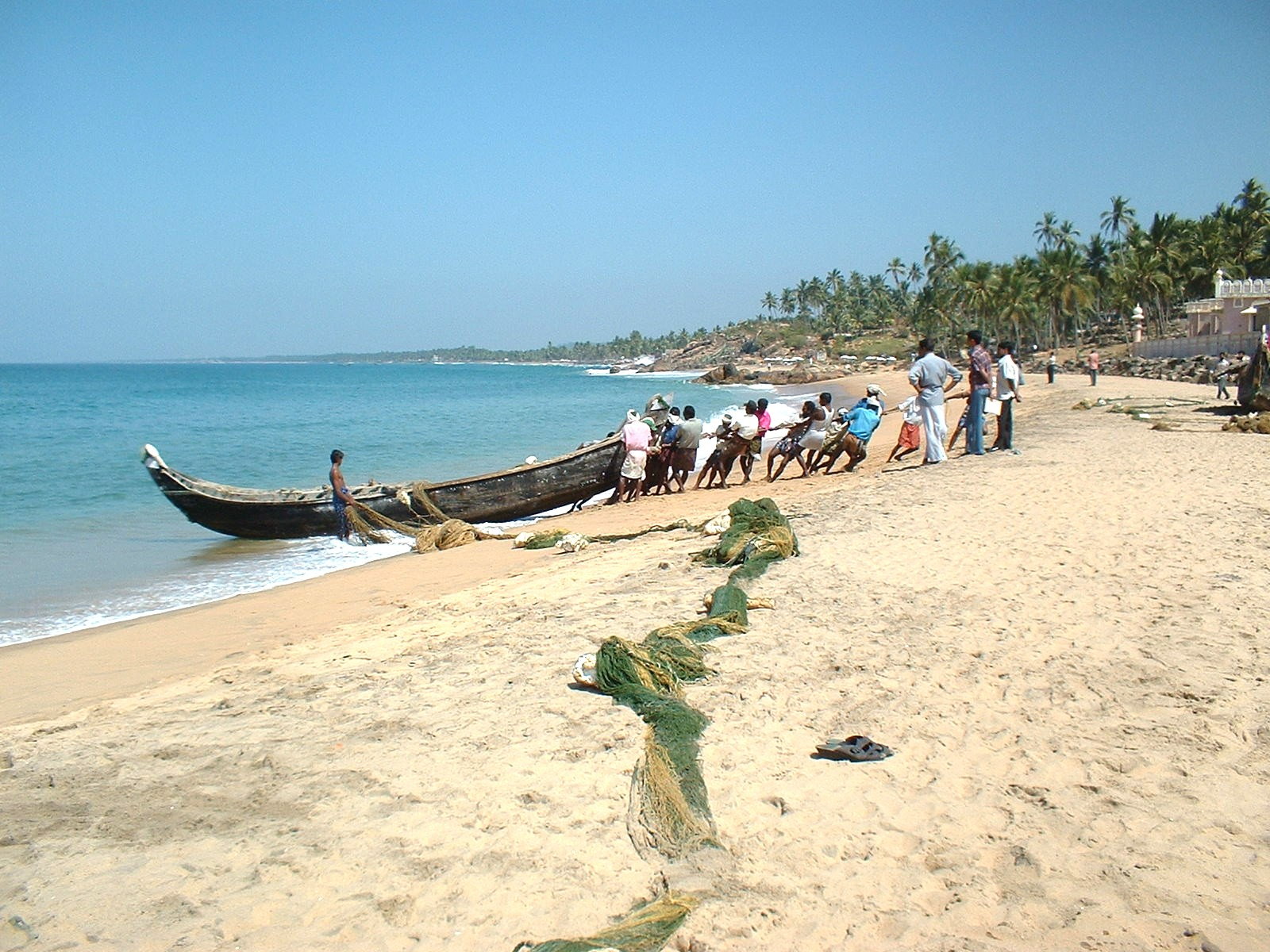
Fishermen and bystanders bringing a fishing boat ashore on Kovalam (Lighthouse) beach (May 2002)

== See also ==
A few other beaches in Kerala

- Kollam Beach
- Varkala Beach
- Shankumugham Beach
