= Jameela Prakasam =

Indian politician

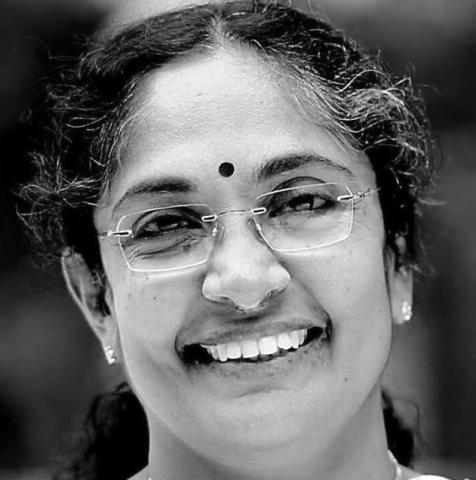
- Jameela Prakasam
- Constituency: Kovalam

Personal details
- Born: 19 May 1957 (age 68)
- Spouse: Neelalohithadasan Nadar
- Children: Two daughters

Jameela Prakasam is the member of 13th Kerala Legislative Assembly. She is a member of J.D (S) party and represents Kovalam constituency.

== Education ==
- B.Sc Zoology (Kerala University)
- MBA (IGNOU University)
- LLB (Kerala University)
- CAIIB (Indian Institute of Bankers)

== Career ==
She entered politics as the vice chairperson of Kerala University Union in 1972. She worked as the Deputy General Manager at State Bank of Travancore, Thiruvananthapuram branch. In March 2011, she voluntarily retired from service to become a full-time politician and activist.

== Personal life ==
She was born on 19 May 1957. She is the daughter of R. Prakasam and Lilly Prakasam. She is married to Dr. A Neelalohithadasan Nadar and has two daughters, Deepthi. N. Nadar and Divya. N. Nadar,
