= Administration of Ernakulam district =

Local government in Kerala, India

Ernakulam District in Kerala, India, has four types of administrative hierarchies.

- Taluk and Village administration managed by the provincial government of Kerala
- Panchayath Administration managed by the local bodies
- Parliament Constituencies for the federal government of India
- Assembly Constituencies for the provincial government of Kerala

== Revenue divisions ==
There are mainly two revenue divisions namely Fort Kochi and Muvattupuzha.

Taluks & its Headquarters

Kanayannur	Ernakulam
Kochi	Fort Kochi
Aluva	Aluva
Kunnathunad	Perumbavoor
Paravur	North Paravur
Kothamangalam	Kothamangalam
Muvattupuzha	Muvattupuzha

Municipalities

North Paravur
Muvattupuzha
Piravom
Aluva
Kothamangalam
Angamaly
Thripunithura
Koothattukulam
Kalamassery
Eloor
Thrikkakara
Perumbavoor
Maradu

== Taluks ==
The district has the most number of taluks in the state. District is divided by two revenue divisions with 7 taluks.

- Paravur
- Aluva
- Kunnathunad
- Muvattupuzha
- Kochi
- Kanayannur
- Kothamangalam

== Municipal corporation ==
Kochi

== Municipalities ==
Ernakulam district has the most number of municipalities in the state.

- North Paravur
- Piravom
- Muvattupuzha
- Koothattukulam
- Perumbavoor
- Aluva
- Angamaly
- Thripunithura
- Kalamassery
- Kothamangalam
- Eloor
- Maradu
- Thrikkakara

== Parliamentary constituencies ==
- Ernakulam Parliamentary Constituency
- Chalakudy Parliamentary Constituency (partially)
- Idukki Parliamentary Constituency (parts of Muvattupuzha taluk and Kothamangalam taluk)
- Kottayam Parliamentary Constituency (parts of Muvattupuzha and Kanayannur taluk)

== Assembly constituencies ==
- Piravom
- Angamaly
- Aluva
- Kalamassery
- North Paravur
- Vypeen
- Kochi
- Ernakulam
- Thrikkakara
- Thripunithura
- Perumbavoor
- Kunnathunad
- Moovattupuzha
- Kothamangalam

== Ernakulam (Lok Sabha constituency) ==
Ernakulam is a Lok Sabha constituency in Kerala.

=== Assembly segments ===
Ernakulam Lok Sabha constituency is composed of the following assembly segments:

1. Paravur
2. Vypin
3. Ernakulam
4. Kochi
5. Thrippunithura
6. Thrikkakara
7. Kalamassery

== Members of Parliament ==
Travancore-Cochin

- 1951: C.P. Mathew, Indian National Congress

Kerala

- 1957: A.M. Thomas, Indian National Congress
- 1962: A.M. Thomas, Indian National Congress
- 1967: V.V. Menon, Communist Party of India (Marxist)
- 1971: Henry Austin, Indian National Congress
- 1977: Henry Austin, Indian National Congress
- 1980: Xavier Arrakkal, Indian National Congress
- 1984: K.V. Thomas, Indian National Congress
- 1989: K.V. Thomas, Indian National Congress
- 1991: K.V. Thomas, Indian National Congress
- 1996: Xavier Arrakkal, Independent, supported by Left Democratic Front
- 1997 (By-Election): Sebastian Paul, Independent, supported by Left Democratic Front
- 1998: George Eden, Indian National Congress
- 1999: George Eden, Indian National Congress
- 2003 (By-Election): Sebastian Paul, Independent, supported by Left Democratic Front
- 2004: Sebastian Paul, Independent, supported by Left Democratic Front
- 2009: K.V. Thomas, Indian National Congress
- 2014: K.V. Thomas, Indian National Congress
- 2019: Hibi Eden, Indian National Congress

=== Ernakulam constituency general/by-election detailed results ===
Based on data from Chief Electoral Office, Kerala

Year	Polled Votes	Poll%	Winner	Party	Votes	%	2nd Position	Party	Votes	%	3rd Position	Party	Votes	%	Margin
2009	744996	72.81	K. V. Thomas	INC	342845	46.03	Sindhu Joy	CPI(M)	331055	44.44	A. N. Radhakrishnan	BJP	52968	7.11	11790
2004	659176	61.09	Sebastian Paul	LDF	323042	49.03	Edward Edezhath	INC	252943	38.39	O.G. Thankappan	BJP	60697	9.21	70099
1999	776933	65.79	George Eden	INC	394058	50.78	Mani Thomas	LDF	282753	36.44	T. D. Rajaleskshmi	BJP	77640	10.01	111305
1998	776105	68.86	George Eden	INC	389387	50.53	Sebastian Paul	LDF	314879	40.86	V. V. Augustine	BJP	62262	8.08	74508
1996	729915	68.77	Xavier Arackal	LDF	335479	46.91	K. V. Thomas	INC	305094	42.66	O. M. Mathew	BJP	46559	6.51	30385
1991	740854	72.67	K. V. Thomas	INC	362975	49.64	V. Viswanatha Menon	CPI(M)	315831	43.20	V. Rahiman	BJP	30082	4.11	47144
1989	774809	80.68	K. V. Thomas	INC	384434	49.90	P. Subramanian Potti	LDF	347684	45.13	A. N. Radhakrishnan	BJP	29107	3.78	36750

== Indian general election, 2014 ==
2014 Indian general election : Ernakulam
Party	Candidate	Votes	%	±%
INC	K V Thomas	353,841	41.59	−4.44
Independent	Christy Fernandez (Note: LDF supported candidate)	266,794	31.36	+31.36
BJP	A N Radhakrishnan	99,003	11.64	+4.53
AAP	Anita Pratap	51,517	6.05	−−−
NOTA	None of the above	9,735	1.14	−−−
Margin of victory		87,047	10.23	+8.64
Turnout		850,834	73.56	
INC hold		Swing	-4.44	

=== Candidate profile ===
The below table provides key information about the candidates from the information declared by them through the affidavits submitted with their nomination.

Candidate	Party	Age	Educational qualification	Declared assets (INR) (Note: Includes declared assets of self, spouse and dependents)	Number of criminal cases		
Candidate	Party	Age	Educational qualification	Declared assets (INR)	Charges Framed (2+ yrs Custody)	Cognizance by Court	Convicted (1+ yr Custody)
Anita Pratap	AAP	55	BA (Hons.), BSc.	200,670,000	Nil	Nil	Nil
A N Radhakrishnan	BJP	54	BA	5,890,000	Nil	Nil	Nil
Dr. Christy Fernandez	Ind.	64	PhD.	24,556,200	Nil	Nil	Nil
Prof. K V Thomas	INC	67	MSc.	12,576,935	Nil	Nil	Nil

== See also ==
- List of constituencies of the Lok Sabha
- Indian general election, 2014 (Kerala)
