= Kochi Assembly constituency =

Constituency of the Kerala legislative assembly in India

Kochi
- Constituency No. 80 for the Kerala Legislative Assembly
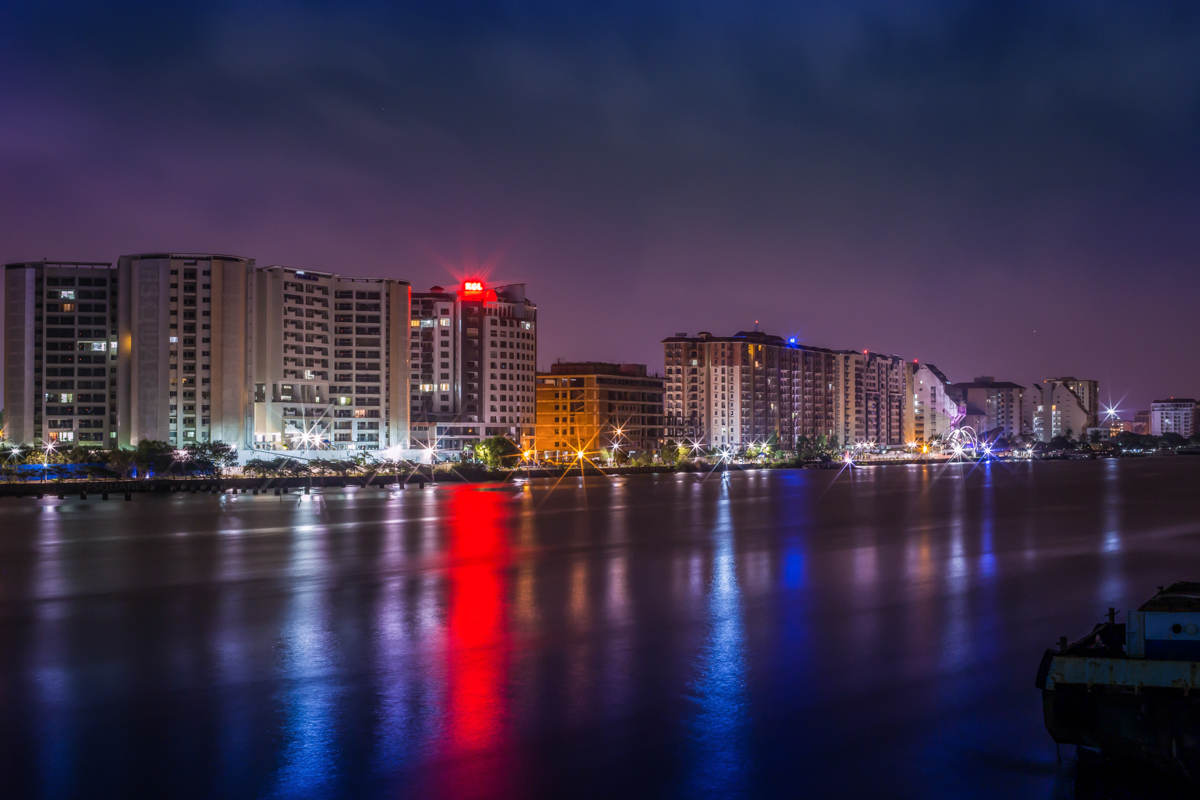
- Marine Drive, Kochi

Constituency details
- Country: India
- Region: South India
- State: Kerala
- District: Ernakulam
- Established: 2008
- Total electors: 1,71,380 (2016)
- Reservation: None

Member of Legislative Assembly
- 16th Kerala Legislative Assembly
- Incumbent Mohammad Shiyas
- Party: INC
- Elected year: 2026

Kochi State assembly constituency is one of the 140 state legislative assembly constituencies in Kerala in southern India. It is also one of the seven state legislative assembly constituencies included in Ernakulam Lok Sabha constituency. As of the 2026 assembly elections, the current MLA is Mohammad Shiyas of INC.

This Constituency is dominated by Latin Catholics. Prior to 2008 delimitation, it was known as Mattanchery Assembly Constituency.

== Local self-governed segments ==
Kochi Assembly constituency is composed of the following 20 wards of the Kochi Municipal Corporation (Fort Kochi zone and Mattancherry zone), and two Gram Panchayats in Kochi taluk:

Wards of Kochi Municipal Corporation in Kochi Assembly constituency
Ward no.	Name	Ward no.	Name	Ward no.	Name
1	Fort Kochi	2	Kalvathy	3	Earavely
4	Karippalam	5	Mattancherry	6	Kochangadi
7	Cheralayi	8	Panayapilly	9	Chakkamadom
10	Karuvelippady	11	Thoppumpady	12	Tharebhagam
21	Pullardesam	22	Mundamveli	23	Manassery
24	Mulamkuzhi	25	Chullikkal	26	Nazareth
27	Fort Kochi Veli	28	Amaravathy		

All of the above 20 wards are included in Kochi taluk.

Other Local Bodies in Kochi Assembly constituency
Sl no.	Name	Local Body Type	Taluk
1	Kumbalangi	Grama panchayat	Kochi
2	Chellanam	Grama panchayat	Kochi

== Members of Legislative Assembly ==
The following list contains all members of Kerala Legislative Assembly who have represented Kochi Assembly constituency during the period of various assemblies:

Election	Niyama Sabha	Name	Party	Tenure
2011	13th	Dominic Presentation	Indian National Congress	2011 – 2016
2016	14th	K. J. Maxi	Communist Party of India	2016 - 2021
2021	15th	K. J. Maxi	Communist Party of India	2021 - 2026
2026	16th	Mohammed Shiyas	Indian National Congress	Incumbent

== Election results ==
Percentage change (±%) denotes the change in the number of votes from the immediate previous election.

=== 2026 ===
2026 Kerala Legislative Assembly election: Kochi
Party	Candidate	Votes	%	±%
INC	Mohammed Shiyas	64,318	47.87	▲16.32
CPI(M)	K. J. Maxi	56,130	41.78	▼1.28
TTP	Adv. Xavier Joolappan	11,854	8.82	▼15.63
NOTA	None of the above	926	0.69	
Margin of victory		8188		
Turnout		134,349		
INC gain from CPI(M)		Swing		

=== 2021 ===
There were 1,81,842 registered voters in the constituency for the 2021 election.

2021 Kerala Legislative Assembly election: Kochi
Party	Candidate	Votes	%	±%
CPI(M)	K. J. Maxi	54,632	42.45	+3.75
INC	Tony Chammany	40,553	31.51	−6.31
TTP	Shiny Antony	19,676	15.29	New
BJP	C. G. Rajagopal	10,991	8.54	−3.73
NOTA	None of the above	474	0.37	−
Margin of victory		14,079	10.94	+10.06
Turnout		1,28,703	70.78	−1.55
CPI(M) hold		Swing	+3.75	

=== 2016 ===
There were 1,71,356 registered voters in the constituency for the 2016 election.

2016 Kerala Legislative Assembly election: Kochi
Party	Candidate	Votes	%	±%
CPI(M)	K. J. Maxi	47,967	38.70%	▲0.96
INC	Dominic Presentation	46,881	37.82%	▼15.57
BJP	Praveen Damodara Prabhu	15,212	12.27%	▲7.08
Independent	K. J. Leenus	7,588	6.12%	−
WPOI	A. S. Muhammed	2,357	1.90%	−
SDPI	Sulfikar Ali	2,108	1.70%	▼0.19
NOTA	None of the above	1,002	0.81%	−
PDP	T. P. Antony	386	0.31%	−
Independent	Johney Stephen	180	0.15%	−
Independent	K. S. Jayaraj	172	0.14%	−
Independent	Abdul Samad	101	0.08%	−
Margin of victory		1,086	0.88%	
Turnout		1,23,954	72.33%	▲5.73
CPI(M) gain from INC		Swing		

=== 2011 ===
There were 1,58,548 registered voters in the constituency for the 2011 election.

2011 Kerala Legislative Assembly election: Kochi
Party	Candidate	Votes	%	±%
INC	Dominic Presentation	56,352	53.37%	
CPI(M)	M. C. Josephine	39,849	37.74%	
BJP	K. Sasidharan	5,480	5.19%	
SDPI	Yoosuf Mufti	1,992	1.89%	
Independent	Dominic C. J.	590	0.56%	
BSP	Kamarudeen T. A.	482	0.46%	
Independent	A. P. Ibrahimkutty	394	0.37%	
Independent	Jacob Pulikkan	258	0.24%	
Independent	T. A. Krishnan Kutty	195	0.18%	
Margin of victory		16,863	15.63%	
Turnout		1,05,592	66.60%	
INC win (new seat)				

== See also ==
- Kochi
- Ernakulam district
- List of constituencies of the Kerala Legislative Assembly
- 2016 Kerala Legislative Assembly election
- 2019 Kerala Legislative Assembly by-elections
