= Xavier Arakkal =

Indian politician

Member of Parliament, Lok Sabha
- In office 1996–1997
- Preceded by: K. V. Thomas
- Succeeded by: Sebastian Paul
- Constituency: Ernakulam
- In office 1980–1984
- Preceded by: Henry Austin
- Succeeded by: K. V. Thomas
- Constituency: Ernakulam

Member of the Kerala Legislative Assembly
- In office 1977–1979
- Preceded by: K. T. George
- Succeeded by: A. C. Jose
- Constituency: Paravur

Personal details
- Born: 16 April 1935 Kingdom of Cochin, British India
- Died: 9 February 1997 (aged 61) Kerala, India
- Spouse: Lereice
- Children: 2

Xavier Arakkal was an Indian politician from Kerala. He represented Paravur Assembly constituency in 5th Kerala Legislative Assembly. After that he was twice elected to the Indian parliament (Lok Sabha), first in 1980 and then in 1996.

== Biography ==
Xavier Arakkal was born on April 16, 1935, the youngest of Manjummal Arakkal Varghese's six children. He studied at St. Albert's College, Ernakulam, St. Joseph's College, Thrissur and Thevara Sacred Hearts College. He then studied in the United States with the help of Archbishop Joseph Attipetti of Verapuzha. He also held a Master of Science in International Relations degree from the University of Chicago, a master's degree from Loyola University and a law degree from the University of London. Xavier stayed in the US and UK till 1970 and returned to India.

After return, Xavier worked as government pleader in Kerala High Court during 1974–77. He held several other positions including convenor of National Forum of Lawyers and Legal Aid and chairman of Kerala Weightlifting Association.

=== Personal life and death ===
While in England, he met and married Jamaican woman Lereice. They have two daughters. He died on February 9, 1997, of kidney failure.

== Political career ==
Winning the 1977 Kerala Legislative Assembly election, Xavier Arakkal represented Paravur Assembly constituency in 5th Kerala Legislative Assembly as an Indian National Congress candidate. After that he was elected to the Indian parliament (Lok Sabha) in 1980 in Congress ticket. In the 1984 elections after the martyrdom of Indira Gandhi, on the instructions of the then Kerala Chief Minister K. Karunakaran, Xavier Arakkal was dropped and K. V. Thomas, a lecturer at Thevara College, was nominated. Rajiv Gandhi directly called back Xavier, who was about to contest as a rebel candidate.

In 1995 Xavier left Congress and became a follower of left wing politics. In 1996 he was again elected to the Lok Sabha as an independent candidate with the support from Left Democratic Front. He died in 1997, before completing his term as an MP.
