= Anna Kitex Group =

Indian conglomerate

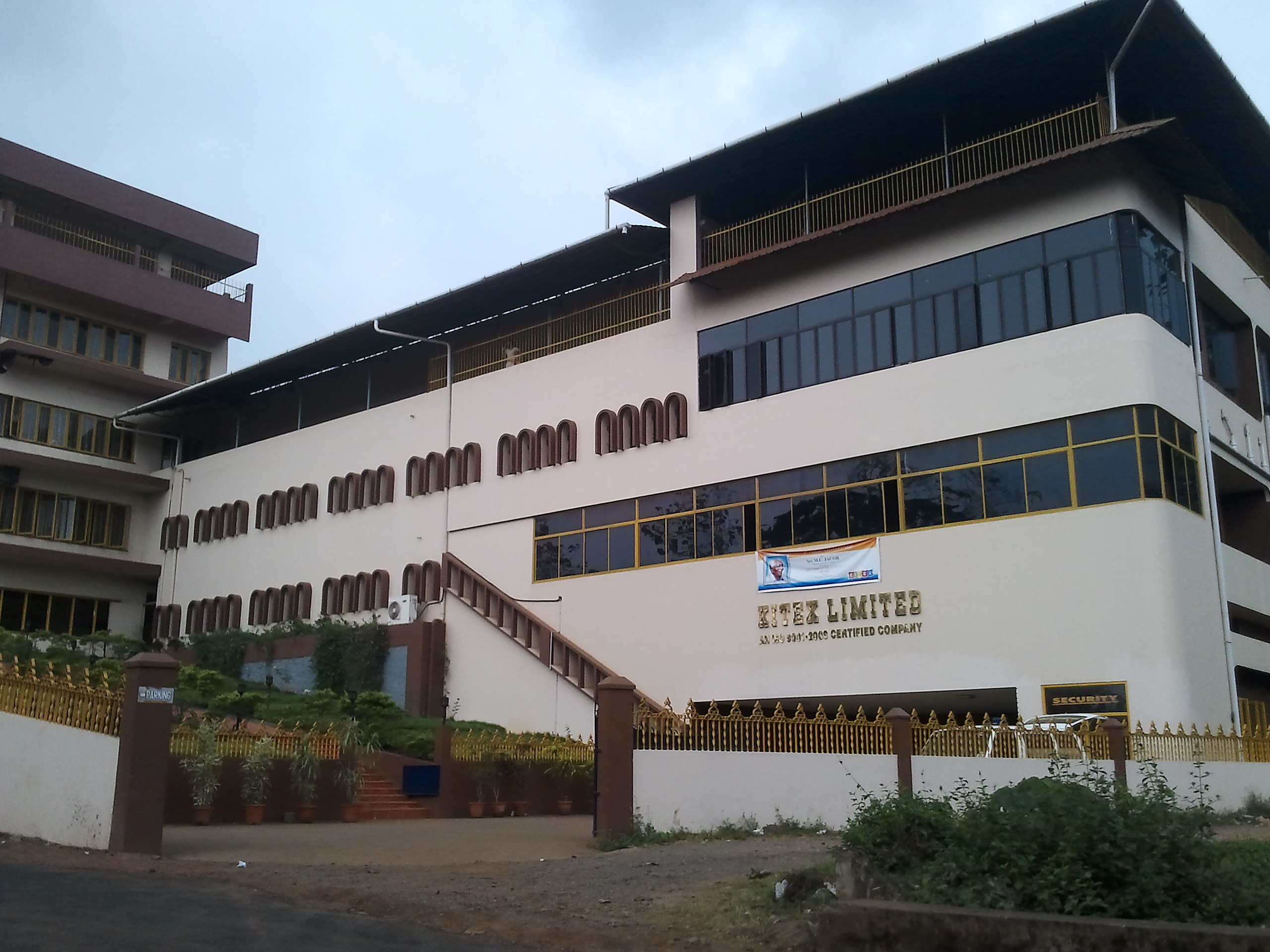
- Kitex Building in Aluva
- Native name: അന്ന കിറ്റെക്സ് ഗ്രൂപ്പ്
- Formerly: Anna Group
- Founded: 1968; 58 years ago
- Founder: M. C. Jacob
- Headquarters: Kizhakkambalam, Aluva, Ernakulam
- Key people: Sabu M. Jacob; Bobby M. Jacob
- Production output: Aluminum; Packaged curry powder; Garments; Bags
- Brands: Kitex; Anna Aluminum; Saras Spices; Chakson Products; Dezire Bags; ScooBee Day Bags
- Subsidiaries: Kitex Garments Limited
- Website: www.annagroup.net

Anna Kitex Group (also known as Kitex) is an Indian conglomerate founded by M. C. Jacob in 1968 and based in Kizhakkambalam, Ernakulam, Kerala.

The group initially made aluminum products such as kitchen utensils and cookware in the 1970s, and later diversified into spices, textiles, and bags. Its flagship company, Kitex Garments Limited, is reportedly the world's second-largest infant clothing manufacturer. It also runs a political party called Twenty20.

== History ==
In 1968, M. C. Jacob founded Anna Aluminum Limited with eight workers. Anna Aluminum Limited changed its name as Anna Group in 1972 and launched a packaged curry powder brand.

In 1978, Anna Group launched a garment brand called Kitex Limited, an acronym of 'Kizhakkambalam Textiles'.

In 1992, Anna Group expanded its business to the global markets by launching Kitex Garments Limited.

In the early 2000s, Anna Group was rebranded as Anna Kitex Group.

In 2011, after the death of M. C. Jacob, company management split between his sons. The elder son handles business in domestic markets, while the younger son runs its international business.

As of 2021, Kitex Garments, a subsidiary of the group, is the world’s second largest infant clothing producer as well as a major supplier to Walmart and Amazon. The Group is one of the largest private sector employers in the state of Kerala.

In July 2021, Kitex Garments Limited announced that they are investing ₹1,000 crore in Telangana by setting up a factory at the Kakatiya Mega Textile Park in Warangal, after dropping their earlier plan of investing ₹3,500 crore (US$370 million) in Kerala.

== Brands ==
- Kitex Limited
- Anna Aluminum
- Saras Spices
- Chakson Products
- Dezire Bags
- ScooBee Day Bags
