= Ernakulam Assembly constituency =

Constituency of the Kerala legislative assembly in India

Ernakulam
- Constituency No. 82 for the Kerala Legislative Assembly
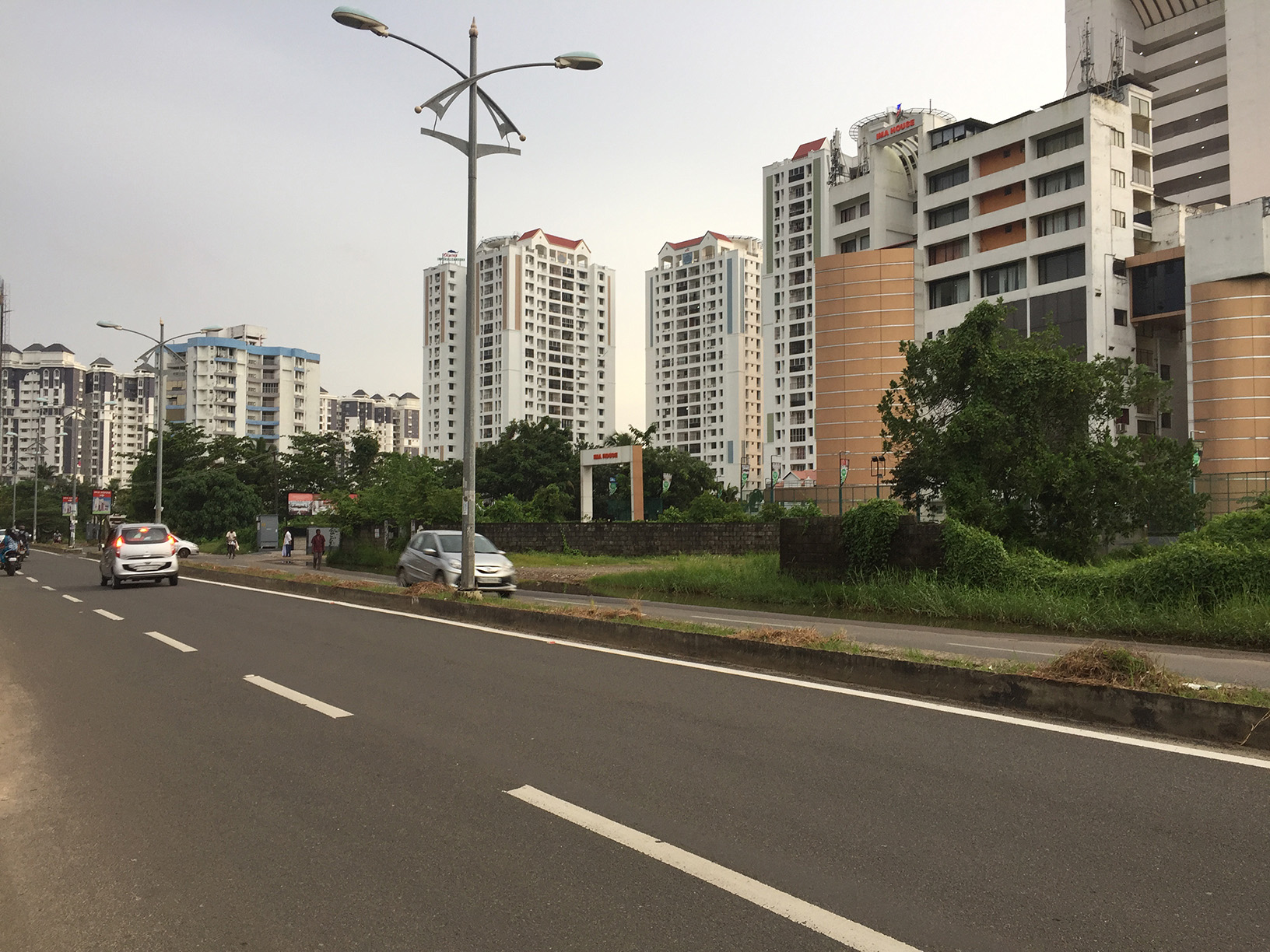
- The Jawaharlal Nehru Stadium Link Road at Kaloor

Constituency details
- Country: India
- Region: South India
- State: Kerala
- District: Ernakulam
- Established: 1957
- Total electors: 1,64,534 (2021)
- Reservation: None

Member of Legislative Assembly
- 16th Kerala Legislative Assembly
- Incumbent T. J. Vinod
- Party: INC
- Alliance: UDF
- Elected year: 2026

Ernakulam State assembly constituency is one of the 140 state legislative assembly constituencies in Kerala in southern India. It is also one of the seven state legislative assembly constituencies included in Ernakulam Lok Sabha constituency. As of the 2026 assembly elections, the current MLA is T. J. Vinod of INC.

== Local self-governed segments ==
Ernakulam Assembly constituency is composed of the following 24 wards of the Kochi Municipal Corporation (Ernakulam zone and Vaduthala zone), and 1 Gram Panchayat in Kanayannur Taluk:

Wards of Kochi Municipal Corporation in Ernakulam Assembly constituency
Ward no.	Name	Ward no.	Name	Ward no.	Name
29	Island North	30	Island South	31	Vaduthala West
32	Vaduthala East	33	Elamakkara North	34	Puthukkalavattam
36	Kunnumpuram	58	Konthuruthy	59	Thevara
60	Perumanur	61	Ravipuram	62	Ernakulam South
63	Gandhi Nagar	64	Kathrikadavu	65	Kaloor South
66	Ernakulam Central	67	Ernakulam North	68	Ayyappankavu
69	Thrikkanarvattom	70	Kaloor North	71	Elamakkara South
72	Pottakuzhy	73	Pachalam	74	Thattazham

Wards 29 and 30 are included in Kochi Taluk, while the remaining 22 wards in the constituency are parts of Kanayannur Taluk.

Other Local Bodies in Ernakulam Assembly constituency
Name	Local Body Type	Taluk
Cheranallur	Grama panchayat	Kanayannur

== Members of Legislative Assembly ==
The following list contains all members of Kerala Legislative Assembly who have represented Ernakulam Assembly constituency during the period of various assemblies:

Key

INC LDF

Election	Niyama Sabha	Member	Party	Tenure
1957	1st	A. L. Jacob	INC	1957 – 1960
1960	2nd	A. L. Jacob	INC	1960 – 1965
1967	3rd	Alexander Parambithara	INC	1967 – 1970
1970	4th	A. L. Jacob	INC	1970 – 1977
1977	5th	A. L. Jacob	INC	1977 – 1980
1980	6th	A. L. Jacob	INC	1980 – 1982
1982	7th	A. L. Jacob	INC	1982 – 1987
1987	8th	M. K. Sanu	Independent (supported by LDF)	1987 – 1991
1991	9th	George Eden	INC	1991 – 1996
1996	10th	George Eden	INC	1996 – 1998
1998*	10th	Sebastian Paul	Independent (supported by LDF)	1998 - 2001
2001	11th	K. V. Thomas	INC	2001 – 2006
2006	12th	K. V. Thomas	INC	2006 – 2009
2009*	12th	Dominic Presentation	INC	2009 - 2011
2011	13th	Hibi Eden	INC	2011 – 2016
2016	14th	Hibi Eden	INC	2016 - 2019
* 2019	14th	T. J. Vinod	INC	2019 - 2021
2021	15th	T. J. Vinod	INC	Incumbent

- * by-election

== Election results ==
Percentage change (±%) denotes the change in the number of votes from the immediate previous election.

=== 2026 ===
2026 Kerala Legislative Assembly election: Ernakulam
Party	Candidate	Votes	%	±%
INC	T. J. Vinod	61,296	56.90	▲15.18
ISJD	Sabu George	25,133	23.33	▼8.42
BJP	P. R. Sivashankar	19,154	17.78	▲3.21
AAP	Moses Henry Motha	783	0.73	−
Independent	Ashokan	287	0.27	−
NOTA	None of the above	1079	1.00	▲0.36
Margin of victory		36,163	33.57	
Turnout		1,07,732		
INC hold		Swing		

=== 2021 ===
There were 1,64,534 registered voters in Ernakulam Assembly constituency for the 2021 Kerala Assembly election.

2021 Kerala Legislative Assembly election: Eranakulam
Party	Candidate	Votes	%	±%
INC	T. J. Vinod	45,930	41.72	▲0.59
LDF	Shaji George	34,960	31.75	▼6.21
BJP	Padmaja S. Menon	16,043	14.57	▼0.28
Twenty20 Party	Leslie Pallath	10,634	9.66	New
NOTA	None of the above	712	0.64	
Margin of victory		10,970	9.97	▲5.8
Turnout		1,08,434	66.92	▲9.01
INC hold		Swing	▲0.59	

=== 2019 by-election ===
Due to the election of the sitting MLA Hibi Eden as the MP from Ernakulam Lok Sabha constituency, Ernakulam Assembly constituency held a by-election on 21 October 2019. There were 1,55,306 registered voters in Ernakulam Assembly constituency for this election. T. J. Vinod won the resulting by-election by 3750 votes.

2019 Kerala Legislative Assembly by-elections: Ernakulam
Party	Candidate	Votes	%	±%
INC	T. J. Vinod	37,891	42.13%	▼10.19
LDF	Manu Roy	34,141	37.96%	▲5.50
BJP	C. G. Rajagopal	13,351	14.85%	▲1.39
Independent	Manu K. M.	2,572	2.86%	N/A
NOTA	None of the above	1,309	1.46%	▲0.61
Independent	Vinod A. P.	206	0.23%	N/A
SFB	Abdul Khader	175	0.19%	N/A
Independent	Jaisen Thomas	116	0.13%	N/A
Independent	Bosco Louis	93	0.10%	N/A
Independent	Ashokan	78	0.09%	N/A
Margin of victory		3,750	4.17%	▼15.69
Turnout		89,932	57.91%	▼13.81
INC hold		Swing	▼10.19	

=== 2016 ===
There were 1,54,092 registered voters in Ernakulam Assembly constituency for the 2016 Kerala Assembly election.

2016 Kerala Legislative Assembly election: Ernakulam
Party	Candidate	Votes	%	±%
INC	Hibi Eden	57,819	52.32%	▼9.26
CPI(M)	M. Anil Kumar	35,870	32.46%	▲4.21
BJP	N. K. Mohandas	14,878	13.46%	▲6.62
NOTA	None of the above	940	0.85%	−
BSP	Iqbal Thamarassery	397	0.36%	▼0.40
SP	Rubesh Jimmy Madathiparambil	258	0.23%	−
Independent	Jossey Mathew	117	0.11%	−
Independent	Anil Kumar Ananthapuram	115	0.10%	−
Independent	Anil Kumar Puliyoth	114	0.10%	−
Margin of victory		21,949	19.86%	▼13.47
Turnout		1,10,508	71.72%	▲0.56
INC hold		Swing	▼9.26	

=== 2011 ===
There were 1,36,722 registered voters in the constituency for the 2011 election.

2011 Kerala Legislative Assembly election: Ernakulam
Party	Candidate	Votes	%	±%
INC	Hibi Eden	59,919	61.58%	
CPI(M)	Sebastian Paul	27,482	28.25%	
BJP	C. G. Rajagopal	6,362	6.54%	
Independent	Sebastian Njalamkunnel	2,347	2.41%	
BSP	Iqbal Thamarassery	742	0.76%	
SS	T. R. Vasudevan	445	0.46%	
Margin of victory		32,487	33.33%	
Turnout		97,297	71.16%	
INC hold		Swing		

== See also ==
- Ernakulam
- Ernakulam district
- List of constituencies of the Kerala Legislative Assembly
- 2016 Kerala Legislative Assembly election
- 2019 Kerala Legislative Assembly by-elections
