= Thrikkakara Assembly constituency =

Constituency of the Kerala legislative assembly in India

Thrikkakara
- Constituency No. 83 for the Kerala Legislative Assembly
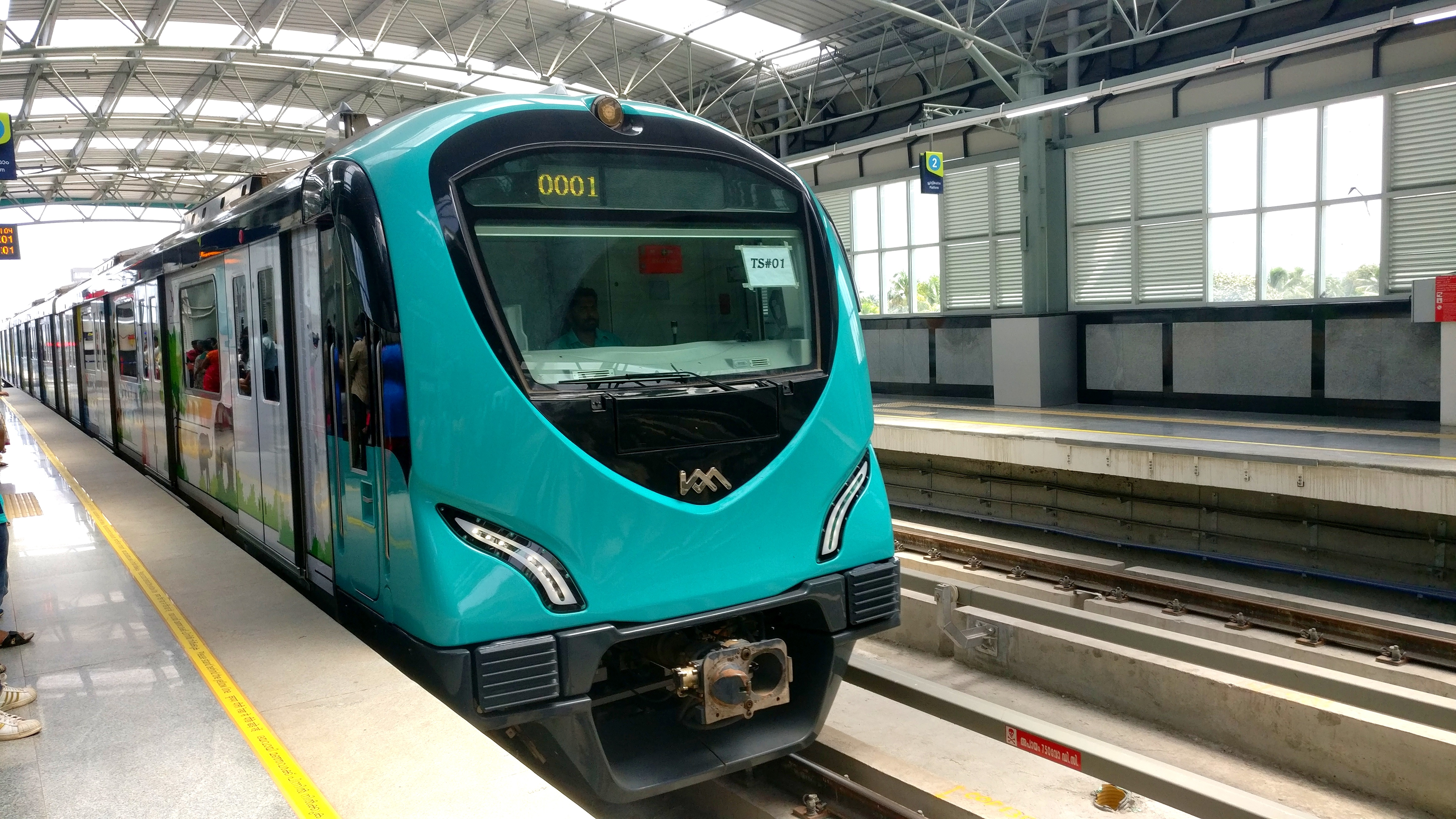
- Kochi Metro at Palarivattom in Thrikkakkara Assembly constituency

Constituency details
- Country: India
- Region: South India
- State: Kerala
- District: Ernakulam
- Established: 2008
- Total electors: 1,81,261 (2016)
- Reservation: None

Member of Legislative Assembly
- 16th Kerala Legislative Assembly
- Incumbent Uma Thomas
- Party: INC
- Alliance: UDF
- Elected year: 2026

Thrikkakara State assembly constituency is one of the 140 state legislative assembly constituencies in Kerala in southern India. It is also one of the seven state legislative assembly constituencies included in Ernakulam Lok Sabha constituency. Since the 2026 Kerala Legislative Assembly election, Uma Thomas of INC is the MLA.

== Local self-governed segments ==
Thrikkakara Assembly constituency is composed of the following 22 wards of the Kochi Municipal Corporation (Edappally zone and Vyttila zone), and one municipality in Kanayannur Taluk:

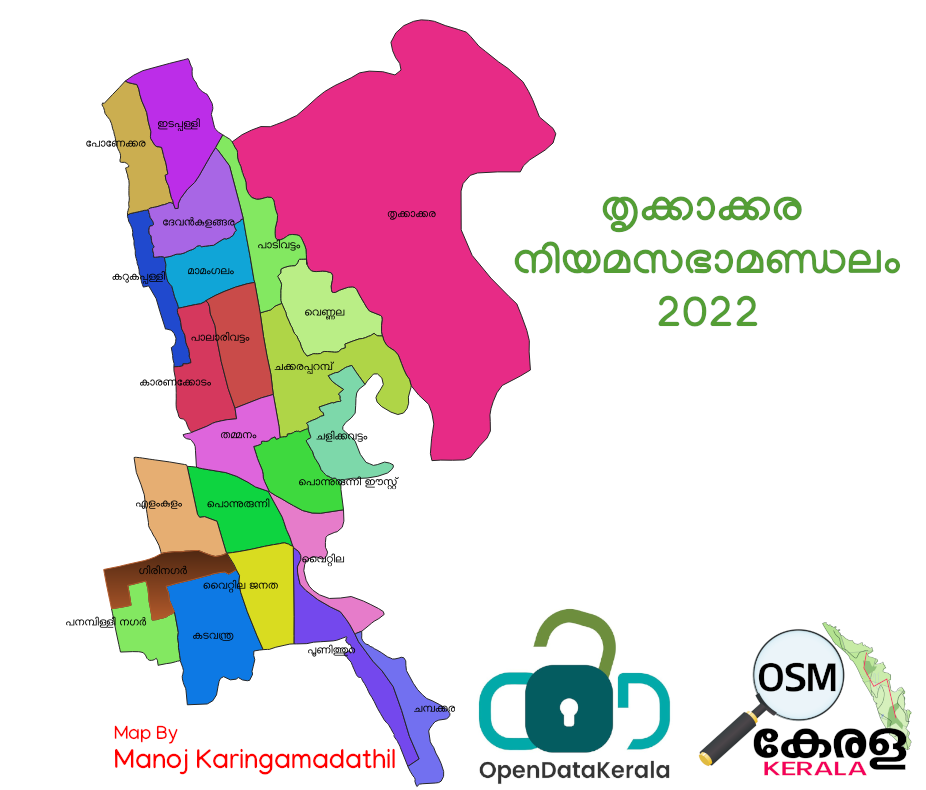
Map of Thrikkakara Assembly constituency

Wards of Kochi Municipal Corporation in Thrikkakara Assembly constituency
Ward no.	Name	Ward no.	Name	Ward no.	Name
35	Ponekkara	37	Edappally	38	Devankulangara
39	Karukapally	40	Mamangalam	41	Padivattom
42	Vennala	43	Palarivattom	44	Karanakkodam
45	Thammanam	46	Chakkaraparambu	47	Chalikkavattam
48	Ponnurunni East	49	Vyttila	50	Chambakkara
51	Poonithura	52	Vyttila Janata	53	Ponnurunni
54	Elamkulam	55	Giri Nagar	56	Panampilly Nagar
57	Kadavanthra				

All of the above 22 wards are included in Kanayannur Taluk.

Other Local Bodies in Thrikkakara Assembly constituency
Sl no.	Name	Local Body Type	Taluk
1	Thrikkakkara	Municipality	Kanayannur

== Members of Legislative Assembly ==
The following list contains all members of Kerala Legislative Assembly who have represented the constituency:

Election	Niyama Sabha	Name	Party	Tenure
2011	13th	Benny Behanan	Indian National Congress	2011–2016
2016	14th	P. T. Thomas	Indian National Congress	2016–2021
2021	15th	P. T. Thomas	Indian National Congress	2021–2021
2022^	15th	Uma Thomas	Indian National Congress	2022 – 2026
2026	16th	Uma Thomas	Indian National Congress	2026 – present

^2022 by-election

== Election results ==
Percentage change (±%) denotes the change in the number of votes from the immediate previous election.

=== 2026 ===
2026 Kerala Legislative Assembly election: Thrikkakara
Party	Candidate	Votes	%	±%
INC	Uma Thomas	83,375		
CPI(M)	Adv. Pushpa Das	33,164		
TTP	Akhil Marar	21,424		
AAP	Jose George	605		
SDPI	Alosius Kollannur	551		
NOTA	None of the above	1,353		
Margin of victory		50,211		
Turnout		140,472		
INC hold		Swing		

=== 2022 by-election ===
Kerala Assembly by election, 2022: Thrikkakara
Party	Candidate	Votes	%	±%
INC	Uma Thomas	72,770	53.76	▲9.94
CPI(M)	Jo Joseph	47,754	35.28	▼1.27
BJP	A. N. Radhakrishnan	12,957	9.57	▼6.13
NOTA	None of the Above	1,111	0.82	
Majority		25,016	18.48	
Turnout		135,349	68.75	
INC hold		Swing		

=== 2021 ===
There were 1,80,733 registered voters in the constituency for the 2016 Kerala Assembly election.

2021 Kerala Legislative Assembly election: Thrikkakara
Party	Candidate	Votes	%	±%
INC	P. T. Thomas	59,839		
LDF	Dr. J. Jacob	45,510		
BJP	S. Saji	15,483		
TTP	Dr. Terry Thomas	13,897		
NOTA	None of the above	695		
BSP	P. M. Shibu	331		
Independent	Riyas Yusuf	298		
SDPI	Krishnaprasad	181		
Independent	Jinu	143		
Independent	Binoj	134		
Independent	Subin	59		
Margin of victory		14,329		
Turnout		1,35,875		
INC hold		Swing		

=== 2016 ===
There were 1,81,261 registered voters in the constituency for the 2016 Kerala Assembly election.

2016 Kerala Legislative Assembly election: Thrikkakara
Party	Candidate	Votes	%	±%
INC	P. T. Thomas	61,268	45.42	▼10.46
CPI(M)	Sebastian Paul	49,455	36.55	▼0.32
BJP	S. Saji	21,247	15.70	▲10.66
NOTA	None of the above	1,275	0.94	−
SDPI	K. M. Shajahan	956	0.71	▼0.03
BSP	Shibu P. A.	346	0.26	▼0.08
Independent	Vinod P. K.	302	175	−
Independent	Silvi Sunil	147	0.11	−
Independent	Sreedharan	82	0.06	−
Independent	Lal Viswan	60	0.04	
Independent	Rahul R.	58	0.04	
Independent	P. H. Ramachandran	52	0.04	
Margin of victory		11,966	8.87	▼8.14
Turnout		1,35,304	74.65	▼0.94
INC hold		Swing	▼10.46	

=== 2011 ===
There were 1,59,877 registered voters in the constituency for the 2011 election.

2011 Kerala Legislative Assembly election: Thrikkakara
Party	Candidate	Votes	%	±%
INC	Benny Behanan	65,854	55.88	
CPI(M)	M. E. Hassainar	43,448	36.87	
BJP	N. Saji Kumar	5,935	5.04	−
Independent	Hassainar	933	0.79	−
SDPI	Abdul Salam Parakkadan	869	0.74	−
Independent	Benny George	410	0.35	−
BSP	Shereef Thankayathil	404	0.34	
Margin of victory		22,406	17.01	
Turnout		1,17,853	73.71	▼0.26
INC win (new seat)				

== See also ==
- Thrikkakara
- Ernakulam district
- List of constituencies of the Kerala Legislative Assembly
- 2016 Kerala Legislative Assembly election
