= Ernakulam Lok Sabha constituency =

Constituency of the Indian parliament in Kerala

Coordinates: 9.99°N 76.30°E

Ernakulam KL-12
- Lok Sabha constituency

Constituency details
- Country: India
- Region: South India
- State: Kerala
- Assembly constituencies: Kalamassery; Paravur; Vypin; Kochi; Thrippunithura; Ernakulam; Thrikkakara
- Established: 1952
- Reservation: None

Member of Parliament
- 18th Lok Sabha
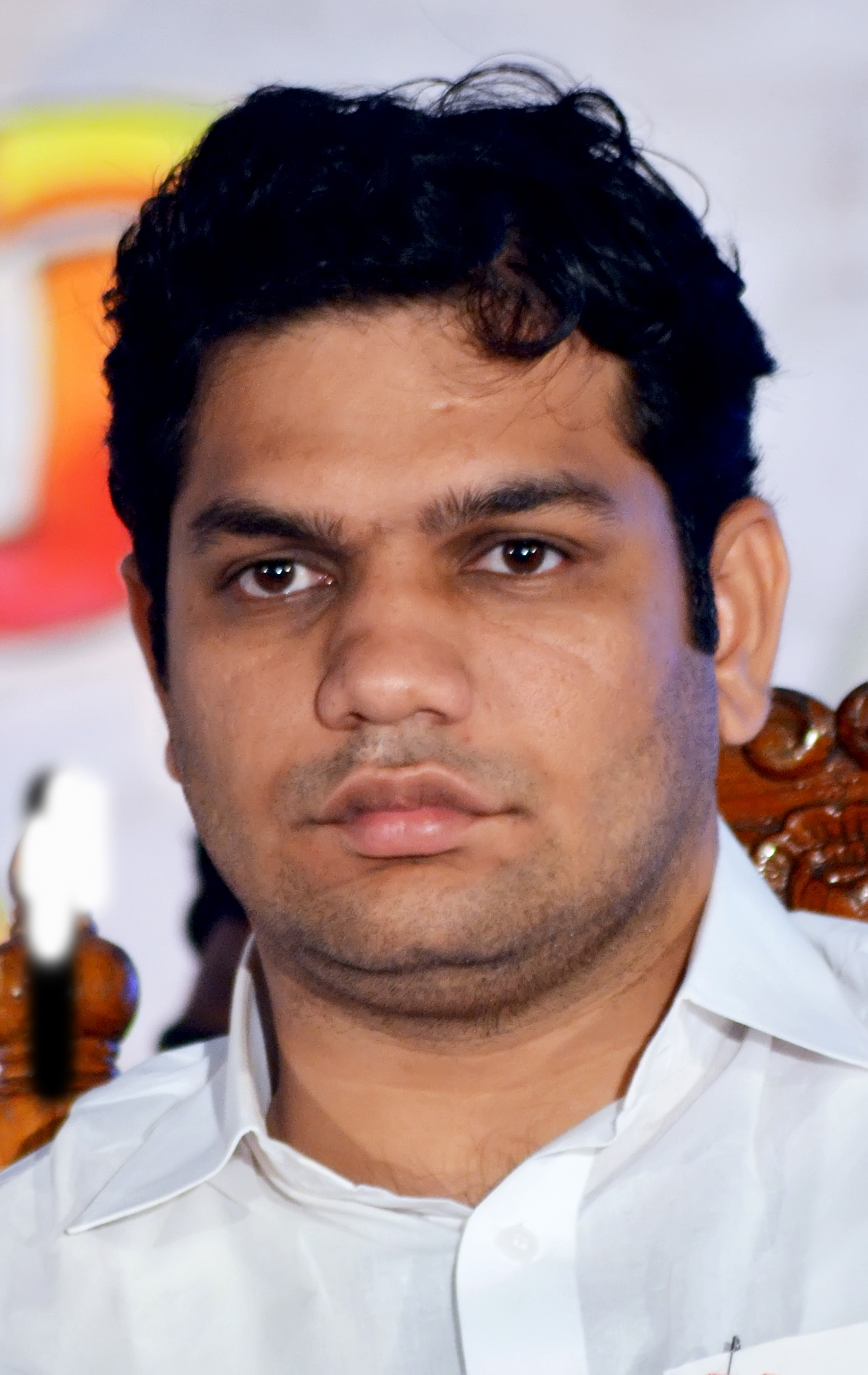
- Incumbent Hibi Eden
- Party: INC
- Alliance: UDF
- Elected year: 2024

Ernakulam Lok Sabha constituency is one of the 20 Lok Sabha (parliamentary) constituencies in Kerala state in southern India.

It comprises 7 legislative assembly constituencies. The constituency is dominated by Latin Catholics, making this seat a Congress stronghold. Eleven of the twelve legislatures were from this community, and the Left parties have only succeeded here by contesting independents, barring once.

== Assembly segments ==
Ernakulam Lok Sabha constituency is composed of the following assembly segments:

No	Name	District	Member	Party	2024 Lead
77	Kalamassery	Ernakulam	V. E. Abdul Gafoor	IUML	INC
78	Paravur	Ernakulam	V. D. Satheesan	INC	INC
79	Vypin	Ernakulam	Tony Chammany	INC	INC
80	Kochi	Ernakulam	Mohammad Shiyas	INC	INC
81	Thrippunithura	Ernakulam	Deepak Joy	INC	INC
82	Ernakulam	Ernakulam	T. J. Vinod	INC	INC
83	Thrikkakara	Ernakulam	Uma Thomas	INC	INC

Before delimitation

- 70. Paravur
- 71. Narakkal
- 72. Ernakulam
- 73. Mattanchery
- 74. Palluruthy
- 75. Thrippunithura
- 76. Aluva

== Members of Parliament ==
Election	Lok Sabha	Member	Party	Tenure
1952	8th	A. M. Thomas	Indian National Congress	1952-1957
1957	9th	A. M. Thomas	Indian National Congress	1957-1962
1962	10th	A. M. Thomas	Indian National Congress	1962-1967
1967	4th	V. Viswanatha Menon	Communist Party of India (Marxist)	1967-1971
1971	5th	Henry Austin	Indian National Congress	1971-1977
1977	6th	Henry Austin	Indian National Congress	1977-1980
1980	7th	Xavier Arakkal	Indian National Congress	1980-1984
1984	8th	K.V. Thomas	Indian National Congress	1984-1989
1989	9th	K.V. Thomas	Indian National Congress	1989-1991
1991	10th	K.V. Thomas	Indian National Congress	1991-1996
1996	11th	Xavier Arakkal	Independent (supported by LDF)	1996-1997
1997*	11th	Sebastian Paul	Independent (supported by LDF)	1997-1998
1998	12th	George Eden	Indian National Congress	1998-1999
1999	13th	George Eden	Indian National Congress	1999-2003
2003*	13th	Sebastian Paul	Independent (supported by LDF)	2003-2004
2004	14th	Sebastian Paul	Independent (supported by LDF)	2004-2009
2009	15th	K.V. Thomas	Indian National Congress	2009-2014
2014	16th	K.V. Thomas	Indian National Congress	2014-2019
2019	17th	Hibi Eden	Indian National Congress	2019-2024
2024	18th	Hibi Eden	Indian National Congress	Incumbent

* indicates bypolls

== Votes in elections ==
Year	Polled votes	Poll%	Winner	Party	Votes	%	2nd position	Party	Votes	%	3rd position	Party	Votes	%	Margin
2024	910502	77.6	Hibi Eden	Indian National Congress	482317	52.97	KJ Shine	Communist Party of India (Marxist)	231932	25.47	K. S. Radhakrishnan	Bharatiya Janata Party	144500	15.87	250385
2019	967203	72.02	Hibi Eden	Indian National Congress	491263	50.79	P Rajeev	Communist Party of India (Marxist)	322110	33.3	Alphons Kannanthanam	Bharatiya Janata Party	137749	14.24	169153
2014	850910	73.58	K. V. Thomas	Indian National Congress	353841		Christy Fernandez	LDF Independent	266794		A. N. Radhakrishnan	Bharatiya Janata Party	99003		87047
2009	744996	72.81	K. V. Thomas	INC	342845	46.03	Sindhu Joy	CPI(M)	331055	44.44	A. N. Radhakrishnan	BJP	52968	7.11	11790
2004	659176	61.09	Sebastian Paul	LDF	323042	49.03	Edward Edezhath	INC	252943	38.39	O.G. Thankappan	BJP	60697	9.21	70099
1999	776933	65.79	George Eden	INC	394058	50.78	Mani Thomas	LDF	282753	36.44	T. D. Rajaleskshmi	BJP	77640	10.01	111305
1998	776105	68.86	George Eden	INC	389387	50.53	Sebastian Paul	LDF	314879	40.86	V. V. Augustine	BJP	62262	8.08	74508
1996	729915	68.77	Xavier Arackal	LDF	335479	46.91	K. V. Thomas	INC	305094	42.66	O. M. Mathew	BJP	46559	6.51	30385
1991	740854	72.67	K. V. Thomas	INC	362975	49.64	V. Viswanatha Menon	CPI(M)	315831	43.20	V. Rahiman	BJP	30082	4.11	47144
1984	774809	80.68	K. V. Thomas	INC	384434	49.90	P. Subramanian Potti	LDF	347684	45.13	A. N. Radhakrishnan	BJP	29107	3.78	36750

== Election results ==
=== General Elections 2029 ===
2029 Indian general election: Ernakulam
Party	Candidate	Votes	%	±%
UDF				
LDF				
NDA				
NOTA	None of the above			
Margin of victory				
Turnout				
		Swing		

=== General Election 2024 ===
2024 Indian general election: Ernakulam
Party	Candidate	Votes	%	±%
INC	Hibi Eden	482,317	52.97	▲2.18
CPI(M)	K. J. Shine	231,932	25.47	▼7.83
BJP	K. S. Radhakrishnan	144,500	15.87	▲1.63
TTP	Adv. Antony Judy	39,808	4.37	N/A
NOTA	None of the above	7,758	0.85	N/A
BSP	Vayalar Jayakumar	1,498	0.16	N/A
Independent	Sandeep Rajendraprasad	752	0.08	N/A
Independent	Cyril Skaria	690	0.08	N/A
Bahujan Dravida Party	Prathapan	419	0.05	N/A
Independent	Rohit Krishnan	416	0.05	N/A
SUCI(C)	Brahmakumar	412	0.05	N/A
Margin of victory		2,50,385	27.49	▲10.01
Turnout		911,035	68.77	
INC hold		Swing		

By Assembly Segments (2024)

No.	Constituency	Party	Lead
77	Kalamassery	INC	38,447
78	Paravur	INC	26,395
79	Vypin	INC	29,868
80	Kochi	INC	40,286
81	Thrippunithura	INC	31,965
82	Ernakulam	INC	37,069
83	Thrikkakara	INC	44,900

=== 2019 ===
According to Election Commission, there are 12,09,44 registered voters in Ernakulam Constituency for 2019 Lok Sabha Election.

2019 Indian general election: Ernakulam
Party	Candidate	Votes	%	±%
INC	Hibi Eden	491,263	50.79	+9.21
CPI(M)	P Rajeev	3,22,210	33.30	N/A
BJP	Alphons Kannanthanam	1,37,749	14.24	▲2.61
NOTA	None of the above	5,378	0.56	
SDPI	V. M. Faizal	4,309	0.45	
BSP	P. A. Niamathulla	1,343	0.14	
SFB	Abdul Kader Vazhakkala	932	0.10	
API	Rajeev Nagan	821	0.08	
Independent	Laila Rasheed	797	0.08	
Independent	Kumar	604	0.06	
Independent	Sreedharan	554	0.06	
Independent	Aswathi Rajappan	494	0.05	
CPI(ML) Red Star	Shahjahan Abdulkhader	470	0.05	
RSPS	Vivek K. Vijayan	379	0.04	
Margin of victory		1,69,053	17.48	
Turnout		967,390	77.64	
INC hold		Swing		

By Assembly Segments (2019)

No.	Constituency	Party	Lead
77	Kalamassery	INC	20,689
78	Paravur	INC	14,085
79	Vypin	INC	23,241
80	Kochi	INC	29,313
81	Thrippunithura	INC	19,227
82	Ernakulam	INC	31,178
83	Thrikkakara	INC	31,777

=== 2014 ===
2014 Indian general election: Ernakulam
Party	Candidate	Votes	%	±%
INC	K.V. Thomas	353,841	41.58	−4.45
LDF	Christy Fernandez	2,66,794	31.35	N/A
BJP	A.N. Radhakrishnan	99,003	11.63	+4.52
AAP	Anita Pratap	51,517	6.05	N/A
IND.	K. V. Bhaskaran	22,733	2.67	N/A
SDPI	Zulficar Ali	14,825	1.74	N/A
NOTA	None of the above	9,735	1.14	−−−
Margin of victory		87,047	10.23	+8.64
Turnout		8,50,834	73.56	
INC hold		Swing	-4.44	

By Assembly Segments (2014)

No.	Constituency	Party	Lead
77	Kalamassery	INC	8,658
78	Paravur	INC	7,765
79	Vypin	INC	9,617
80	Kochi	INC	20,362
81	Thrippunithura	INC	6,571
82	Ernakulam	INC	16,893
83	Thrikkakara	INC	17,314

=== 2009 ===
2009 Indian general elections: Ernakulam
Party	Candidate	Votes	%	±%
INC	K. V. Thomas	342,845	46.10	
CPI(M)	Sindhu Joy	331,055	44.52	
BJP	A. N. Radhakrishnan	52,968	7.12	
BSP	Sheriff Mohammed	4,083	0.55	
Independent	Mary Francis	3,134	0.42	
Independent	Sindhu Jayan	3,004	0.40	
LJP	Saju Thomas	2,902	0.39	
CPI(ML)L	K. S. Sindhu	2,734	0.37	
Independent	Viswambharan	1,313	0.18	
SS	Saji Thuruthikunnel	831	0.11	
Margin of victory		11,790	1.58	
Turnout		744,869	69.14	
INC gain from LDF		Swing		

By Assembly Segments (2009)

No.	Constituency	Party	Lead
77	Kalamassery	CPI(M)	4,399
78	Paravur	CPI(M)	5,832
79	Vypin	INC	234
80	Kochi	INC	7,026
81	Thrippunithura	CPI(M)	6,053
82	Ernakulam	INC	10,730
83	Thrikkakara	INC	10,522

=== 2004 ===
2009 Indian general elections: Ernakulam
Party	Candidate	Votes	%	±%
LDF	Sebastian Paul	323,042	49.03	
INC	Edward Edezhath	252,943	38.39	
BJP	O. G. Thankappan	60,697	9.21	
Independent	T. B. Mini	10,418	1.58	
Independent	P. S. Gangadharan	6,185	0.94	
Independent	Thankappan Chattan	1,835	0.28	
Independent	Noushad Mather	1,718	0.26	
Independent	T. E. Thomas	1,102	0.17	
JD(U)	Munambam Hamza	976	0.15	
Margin of victory		70,099	10.64	
Turnout		658,916	61.06	
LDF hold		Swing		

By Assembly Segments (2004)

No.	Constituency	Party	Lead
70	Paravur	LDF-IND	11,035
71	Narakkal	LDF-IND	8,420
72	Ernakulam	LDF-IND	4,629
73	Mattanchery	LDF-IND	3,681
74	Palluruthy	LDF-IND	4,024
75	Thrippunithura	LDF-IND	18,834
76	Aluva	LDF-IND	18,888

=== 2003 Bye election ===
2003 Bye election: Ernakulam
Party	Candidate	Votes	%	±%
LDF	Sebastian Paul	335,308	45.88	
INC	M. O. Jhon	313,176	42.85	
BJP	V. Viswanatha Menon	51,420	7.03	
PDP	Poonthura Siraj	17,426	2.38	
Independent	Francis Kalathungal	8,856	1.21	
Independent	Suresh M. K.	2,324	0.31	
Independent	Dr. K. Padmarajan	2,215	0.30	
Margin of victory		22,132	3.03	
Turnout		730,725		
LDF gain from INC		Swing		

=== 1999 ===
1999 Indian general elections: Ernakulam
Party	Candidate	Votes	%	±%
INC	Adv. George Eden	394,058	50.78	
LDF	Manu Thomas Vithayathil	282,753	36.44	
BJP	T. D. Rajalekshmi	77,640	10.01	
Independent	Edwin Thomson	7,242	0.93	
Independent	T. K. Padmanabhan	6,311	0.81	
Independent	Jogi Joseph Vithayathil	3,202	0.41	
Independent	Jose Padickal	2,994	0.39	
Independent	Moideen Shah	1,750	0.23	
Independent	Viswambharan	1,313	0.18	
Margin of victory		1,11,305	14.34	
Turnout		775,950	65.70	
INC gain from LDF		Swing		

By Assembly Segments (1999)

No.	Constituency	Party	Lead
70	Paravur	INC	5,319
71	Narakkal	INC	8,771
72	Ernakulam	INC	22,075
73	Mattanchery	INC	16,930
74	Palluruthy	INC	18,376
75	Thrippunithura	INC	13,819
76	Aluva	INC	26,157

== See also ==
- Ernakulam
- List of constituencies of the Lok Sabha
- Indian general election, 2014 (Kerala)
