= Mohammad Shiyas =

Indian politician (born 1977)

Mohammed Shiyas
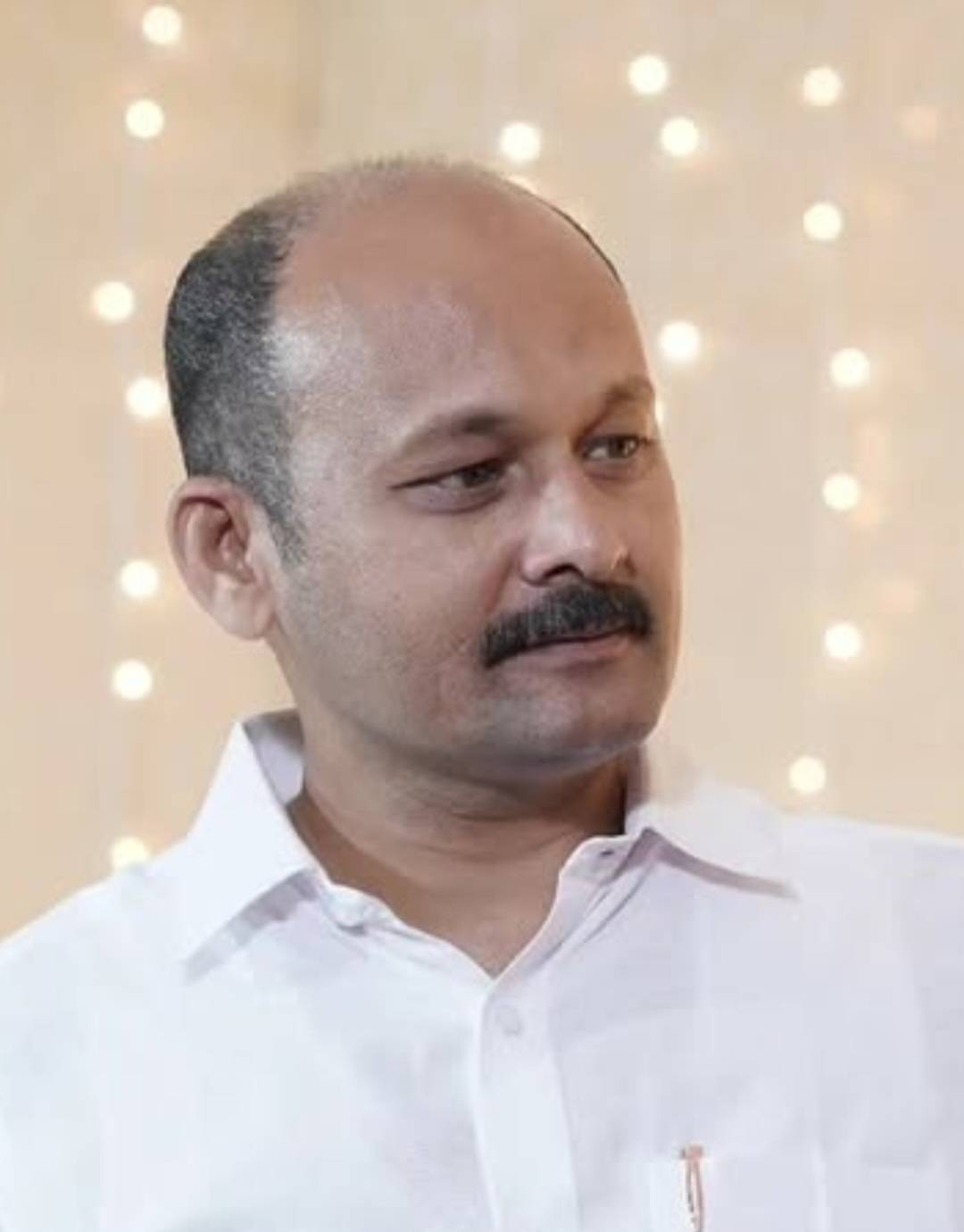

Member of the Kerala Legislative Assembly
- Incumbent
- Assumed office 21 May 2026
- Preceded by: K. J. Maxi
- Constituency: Kochi

Personal details
- Born: Mohammed Shiyas; 1977 (age 48–49) Choornikkara, Aluva, Ernakulam district, Kerala, India
- Party: Indian National Congress
- Parent: Marakkar (father)
- Education: Master Of Laws
- Occupation: Politician, Social Worker

Mohammed Shiyas (born 1977) is an Indian politician serving as the member of the legislative assembly (MLA) for the Kochi constituency in the Kerala Legislative Assembly. A leader of the Indian National Congress, he was elected in the 2026 Kerala Legislative Assembly election, defeating the Communist Party of India (Marxist) (CPIM). He currently serves as the president of the Ernakulam District Congress Committee (DCC).

== Early life and education ==
As the Ernakulam DCC president, Shiyas led various protests and political campaigns against the state government, which resulted in numerous political cases being registered against him.

In the 2026 Kerala Assembly elections, he was fielded by the Congress in the Kochi constituency, which had been held by the LDF since 2016. In a closely contested election, Shiyas polled 64,318 votes, defeating the incumbent MLA K. J. Maxi of the CPIM by a margin of 8,188 votes. His victory was seen as a significant win for the UDF in Ernakulam.

== Election results ==
=== 2026 Kerala Legislative Assembly election ===
Party	Candidate	Votes	%	±%	
	INC	Mohammed Shiyas	64,318	47.87	+16.36
	CPI(M)	K. J. Maxi	56,130	41.78	-0.67
	Twenty20	Adv. Xavier Julappan	11,854	8.82	-6.47
	SDPI	Aneesh Mattancherry	803	0.60	-
Margin of victory		8,188	6.09		
Total valid votes		1,34,349			
INC gain from CPI(M)		Swing	+8.52		
