= Ernakulam (disambiguation) =

Ernakulam is a city in Kerala, India. It may also refer to:

- Ernakulam district, a district in Kerala
- Ernakulam (Lok Sabha constituency), a constituency in Kerala
