= Sabu M. Jacob =

Indian businessman from Kerala

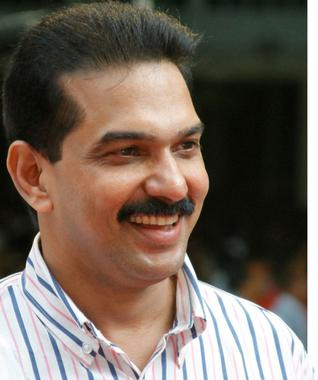
- Sabu M Jacob in 2015
- Born: Kizhakkambalam, Ernakulam, Kerala, India
- Education: Union Christian College, Aluva
- Occupation: Businessman
- Political party: Twenty 20 Party
- Parents: M. C. Jacob; Aleyamma Jacob
- Awards: Finalist for EY Entrepreneur of the Year 2015

Sabu M. Jacob (born 11 May 1962) is an Indian businessman from Kerala. He is the managing director of Kitex Garments Limited. He is the chief coordinator and mentor of Twenty20 Party.

== Biography ==
Sabu M. Jacob was born to M. C. Jacob, founder chairman of the Anna Kitex Group and one of Kerala's pioneering industrialists. After his schooling he got graduation in Economics. He has been Managing Director of Kitex Garments Ltd since 16 August 2006 and has been its chief financial officer since 25 January 2016. Inspired by his father's entrepreneurial success, Sabu decided to establish a garment unit of his own in 1992. This 100% export oriented business began its operations from Kizhakkambalam in 1995, and has today, emerged as the world's third largest infant wear manufacturing company. The company is listed as one of the best Asian companies by Forbes. As of 27 March 2019, his net worth stands at Rs 2,204 crores.

In 2013 Twenty-20 was founded to implement Corporate Social Responsibility initiatives of the company in Kizhakkambalam, the eastern suburb of Kochi. The long-term objective of Twenty-20 is to make Kizhakkambalam a model village by the year 2020 – a model of sustainable development, replicable anywhere in India and the world. In November 2015 Twenty-20 managed to win local body elections with 69 percent vote share Development initiatives were carried out by Twenty-20 through Housing Projects, Drinking Water Projects, Health, Agriculture, Education, Employment Opportunities, Green initiative, Anti-Corruption, Infrastructure, school upgrades and kindergartens, supplementary diet, Anti Alcohol Movement environmental protection activities and women empowerment programs.

== Awards and recognitions ==
Kitex MD, Sabu M. Jacob featured among the finalists for EY Entrepreneur of the Year 2017.
