= Soumini Jain =

Indian politician

Former Mayor of Kochi Municipal Corporation
- In office 2015–2020
- Preceded by: Tony Chammany
- Succeeded by: Adv.M.Anil Kumar

Personal details
- Party: Congress(I)

Soumini Jain is an Indian politician. She served as the mayor of Cochin Corporation between 2015 and 2020. She belongs to the Congress. On the council, Soumini represented the municipal corporation's 36th division (Elamkulam).

== Early life ==
Soumini Jain was born in Ravipuram, Ernakulam, Kochi in a top Hindu Nair family. She is the daughter of P K Menon. She received a graduation degree from the Sacred Heart College, Thevara and did her Masters in Economics from Kerala University. She has married a businessman Jain and they are the parents of Padmini Jain and Varun Jain.

Soumini Jain was put forward as a candidate to be mayor in 2015. The mayor would normally serve for a term of five years.
