= P. T. Thomas =

Indian politician (1950–2021)

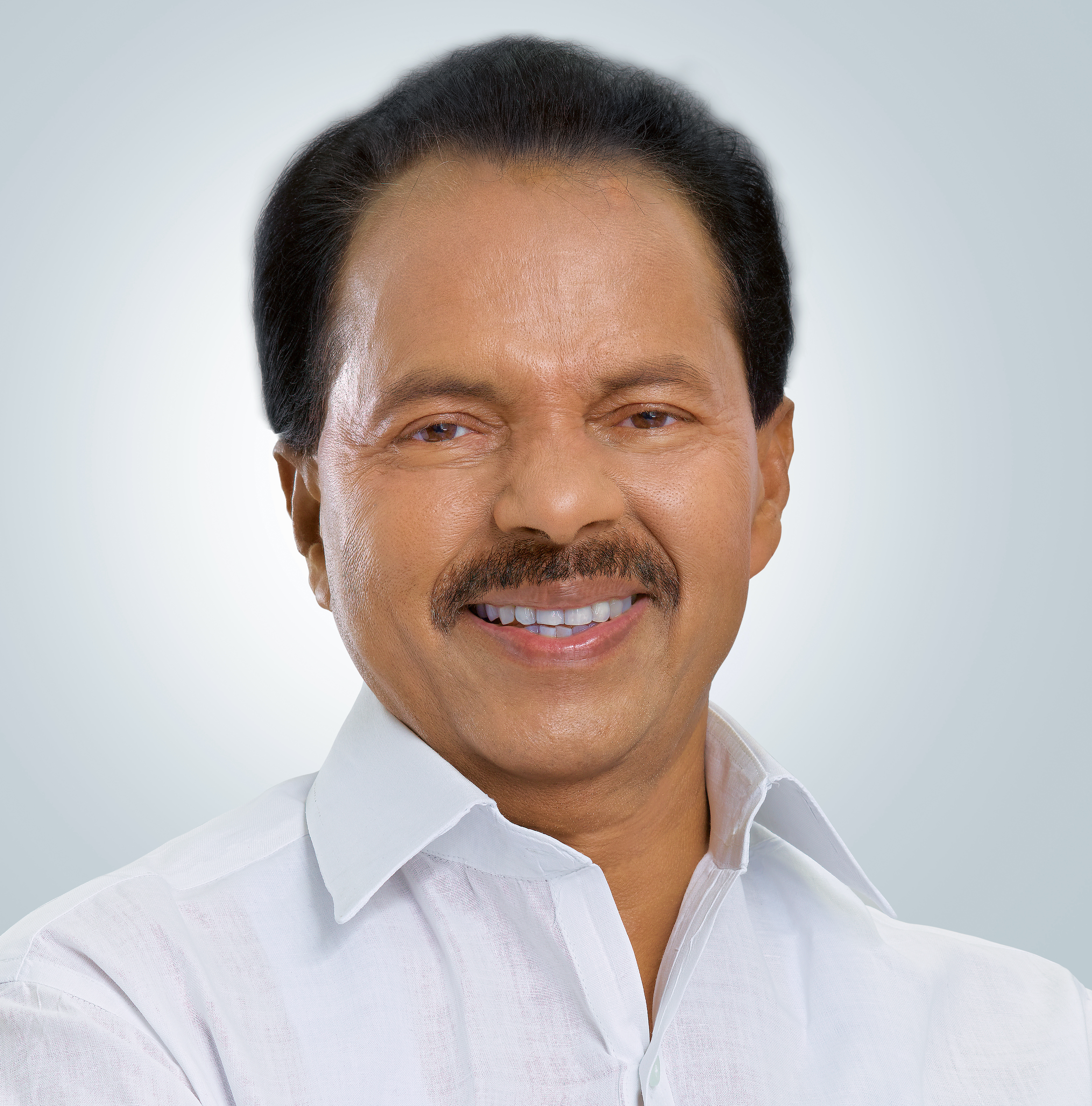

Member of legislative assembly
- In office 2016 – 22 December 2021
- Constituency: Thrikkakara

Personal details
- Born: 12 December 1950 Upputhode, Idukki, Kerala, India
- Died: 22 December 2021 (aged 71) Christian Medical College, Vellore, Tamil Nadu, India
- Party: Indian National Congress
- Spouse: Uma Thomas
- Children: 2
- Parent(s): P.T. Thomas and Annamma Thomas
- Education: Mar Ivanios College, Thiruvananthapuram; Newman College, Thodupuzha; Maharaja's College, Ernakulam; Government Law College, Kozhikode; Government Law College, Ernakulam; St.George H.S, Parathode
- Profession: Political and Social Worker; Advocate; Physical Education Teacher

Puthiyaparambil Thomas Thomas (12 December 1950 – 22 December 2021) was an Indian politician who served as a member of the Kerala Legislative Assembly, represented Thrikkakkara assembly constituency from 2016 until his death in 2021. He was also a Member of Parliament who represented the Idukki Lok Sabha constituency in Kerala, India. He was a member of the Indian National Congress.

He was elected to Kerala Legislative Assembly from Thrikkakkara assembly constituency in 2016 Kerala Legislative Assembly election by defeating Sebastian Paul of Communist Party of India (Marxist) by a margin of 11996 votes.

Thomas died from spine cancer on 22 December 2021, at the age of 71. He was still serving as the Member of Legislative Assembly when he died, and his death came as a shock, since no one except his family was aware of his illness. He was cremated with full state honours at Ravipuram Crematorium in Ernakulam, without any religious customs, since he was an atheist. According to his wish, the popular Malayalam film song Chandrakalabham Charthiyurangum was played at his funeral. His seat was later filled by his wife Uma Thomas, who won the by-elections held five months later.

== Positions held ==
- 2016 – 22 December 2021 - MLA, Kerala Legislative Assembly, Thrikkakkara assembly constituency
- 1991–1996, 2001–2006 – MLA, Kerala Legislative Assembly, Thodupuzha assembly constituency
- 2009–2014 – Member of Parliament, Lok Sabha, Idukki Lok Sabha Constituency
- 2009 – Member, Committee on Personnel, Public Grievances, Law and Justice Lok Sabha
- 2007 – President, District Congress Committee
- 1990 – Member, Idukki District Council
- 1980 – Member, Kerala Pradesh Congress Committee
- Working President, Kerala Pradesh Congress Committee

== Literary works ==
- ADByum Prathyasasthra Shadyangalum – an analysis on the issues related to the taking of ADB loan
