= Hibi Eden =

Indian politician (born 1983)

Hibi George Eden
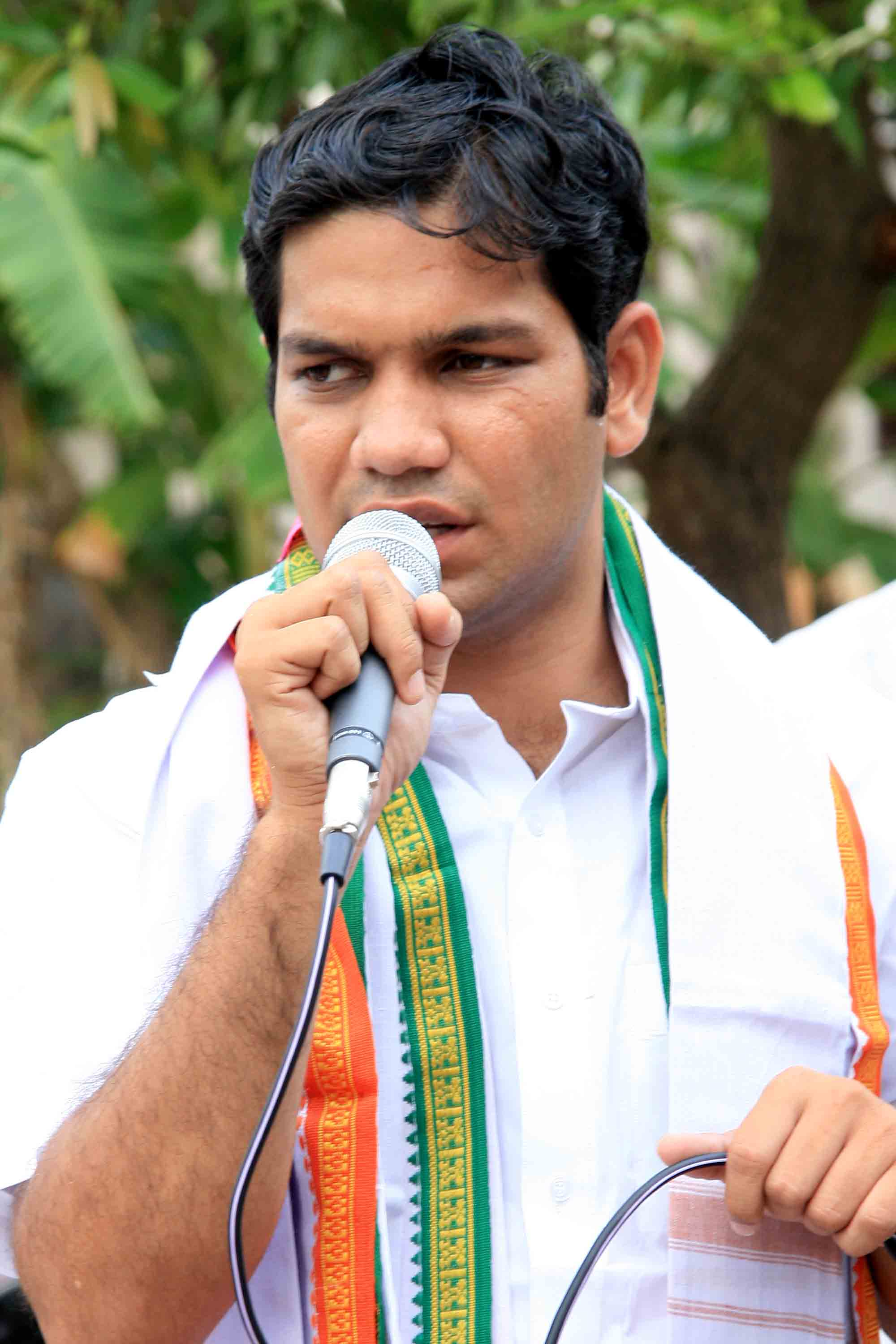

Member of Parliament, Lok Sabha
- Incumbent
- Assumed office 23 May 2019
- Preceded by: K. V. Thomas
- Constituency: Ernakulam, Kerala

Member of the Kerala Legislative Assembly
- In office 2011–2019
- Preceded by: Dominic Presentation
- Succeeded by: T. J. Vinod
- Constituency: Ernakulam

Personal details
- Born: 19 April 1983 (age 43) Ernakulam, Kerala, India
- Party: Indian National Congress
- Spouse: Anna Linda (m. 2012)

Hibi George Eden, commonly known as Hibi Eden (born 19 April 1983) is an Indian politician from Ernakulam, Kerala and member of the Indian National Congress. Hibi is the son of the late George Eden, a long time member of Parliament from the Ernakulam constituency.

== Early life ==
Hibi Eden was born in Ernakulam, Kerala to the former Ernakulam MP George Eden (who died in office, 2003) and Rani Eden at Thoppumpady, Ernakulam on 19 April 1983. He has a younger sister. He lost his mother at an early age and his aunt raised him and his younger sister.

== Personal life ==
Hibi Eden married Anna Linda, a Malayalam television channel anchor on 30 January 2012 at Kaloor St Francis Xavier church after 4 years of love. The couple has a daughter. Hibi is a devout member of the Keralite Latin Catholic community.

== Political career ==
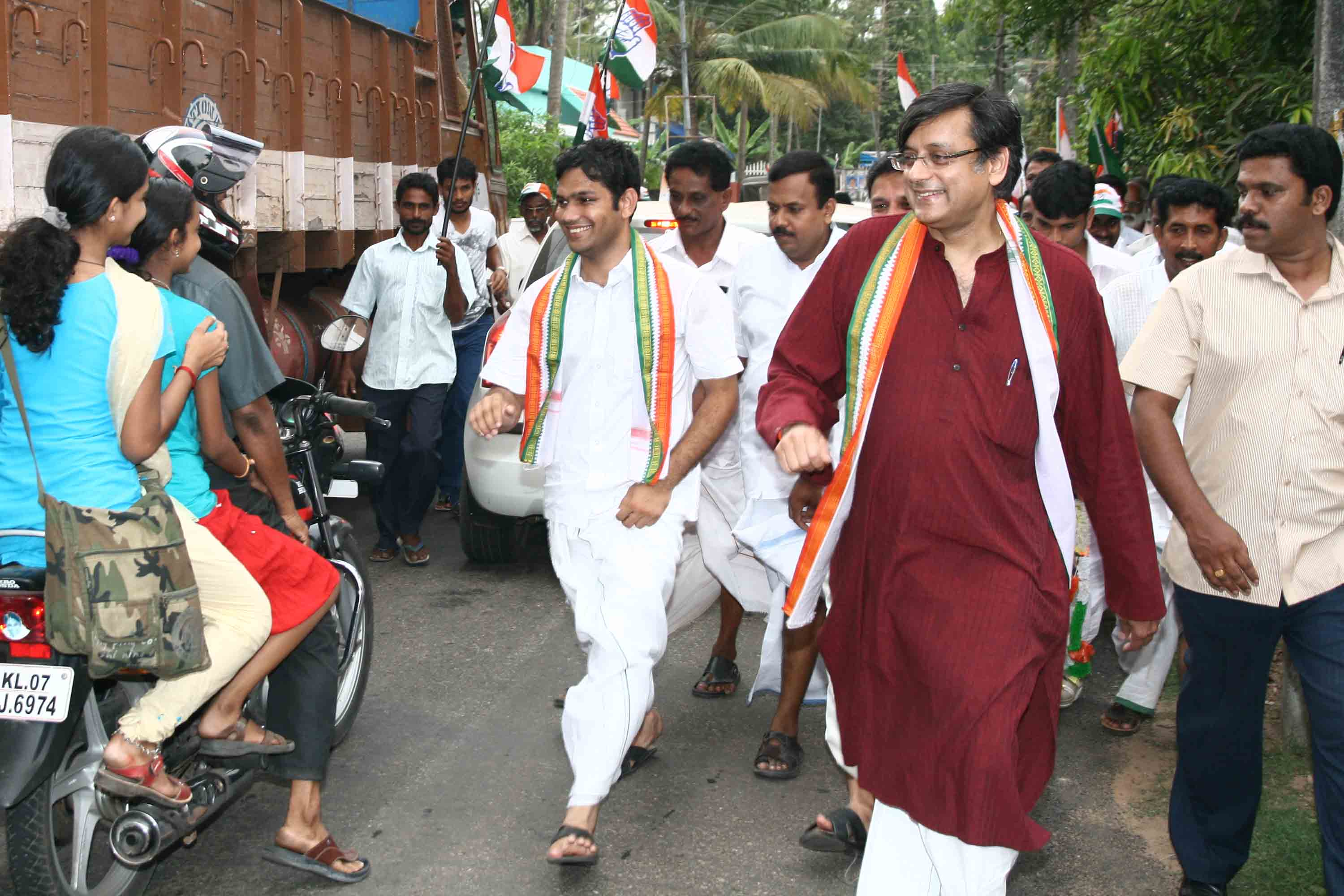
Hibi Eden with Shashi Tharoor during 2011 election campaign.

Hibi Eden was the general secretary of the Kerala Students Union ( KSU) at Sacred Heart College, Thevara. He later became the president of KSU and National Students' Union of India (NSUI), the students' wing of the Indian National Congress.

He became a member of the Legislative Assembly of Kerala from Ernakulam constituency after winning the 2011 Kerala Assembly elections by a 32,437 vote majority, making him the youngest member in the Assembly. In 2016 assembly elections, he got elected for the second time as the Member of the Legislative Assembly of Kerala from Ernakulam constituency winning by 21949 votes. In 2019 Loksabha election he contested from Ernakulam (Lok Sabha constituency) and Eden won by a margin of over 1.6 lakh votes against his nearest rival, P. Rajeev (Kerala) of CPI(M). In 2024 Loksabha election he contested again from Ernakulam (Lok Sabha constituency) and Eden won by a margin of over 2.5 lakh votes against his nearest rival, K J Shine of CPI(M).

Parliamentary Election
Year	Constituency	Closest Rival	Majority (Votes)	Won/Lost
2019	Ernakulam	P Rajeev CPI(M)	169510	Won
2024	Ernakulam	K.J. Shine Teacher CPI(M)	250385	Won

Kerala Legislative Assembly Election
Year	Constituency	Closest Rival	Majority (Votes)	Won/Lost
2011	Ernakulam	Dr. Sebastian Paul (IND)	32437	Won
2016	Ernakulam	M Anil Kumar (CPI(M))	21949	Won

Represented India in the Commonwealth Country Seminar held at Samova Island and presented a paper on ‘Parliament and Civil Society’. Represented a ten member Kerala Assembly delegation to China in 2012. Represented INC as a member of Multiparty delegation invited by Singapore High Commission in 2013. Represented India in the Indo-Pak delegation to American Council of Young Political Leaders (ACYPL) held in US in 2014. Represented India in the European Union Visitors Programme in 2015. Attended the Conference of the Regions conducted as the preparatory session of the World Climate Change Conference in Lyon, France (2015) and presented a paper on 'Transport and mobility'.

== Parliamentary Activity ==
During the 17th Lok Sabha, Hibi Eden has 89% attendance. In this term, he asked a total of 318 questions, participated in 61 debates, and introduced 9 private member bills.
