= K. V. Thomas =

Indian politician

Kuruppassery Varkey Thomas
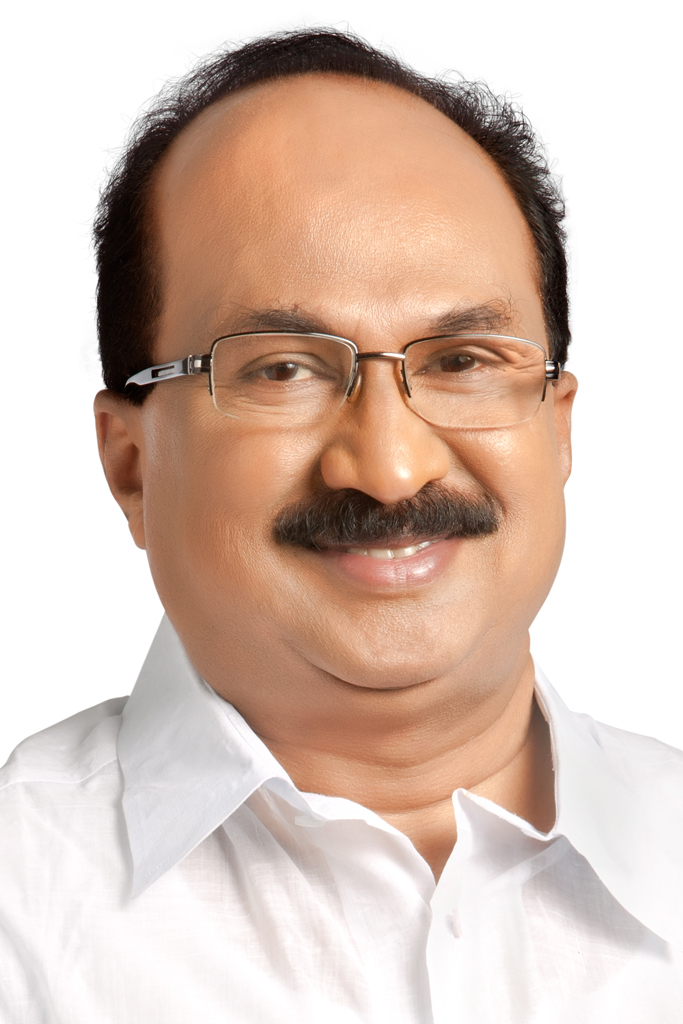

Minister of Consumer Affairs, Food & Public Distribution
- In office 19 January 2011 – 26 May 2014
- Prime Minister: Manmohan Singh
- Preceded by: Sharad Pawar
- Succeeded by: Ram Vilas Paswan

Member of Parliament, Lok Sabha
- In office 16 May 2009 – 23 May 2019
- Preceded by: Sebastian Paul
- Succeeded by: Hibi Eden
- Constituency: Ernakulam
- In office 31 December 1984 – 16 May 1996
- Preceded by: Xavier Arakkal
- Succeeded by: Xavier Arakkal
- Constituency: Ernakulam

Member of Kerala Legislative Assembly
- In office 13 May 2001 – 16 May 2009
- Preceded by: Sebastian Paul
- Succeeded by: Dominic Presentation
- Constituency: Ernakulam

Minister For Tourism, Fisheries and Excise Government of Kerala
- In office 11 February 2004 - 29 August 2004 (Minister For Fisheries and Excise)
- Preceded by: Himself (Fisheries), K. Sankaranarayanan (Excise)
- Succeeded by: Dominic Presentation (fisheries), Vakkom Purushothaman (Excise)
- In office 26 May 2001 - 11 February 2004 (Minister For Tourism and Excise)
- Preceded by: T. K. Ramakrishnan (fisheries) E. Chandrasekharan Nair (Tourism)
- Succeeded by: Himself (fisheries), P. Sankaran (Tourism)

Personal details
- Born: 10 May 1946 (age 80) Kumbalangi, Kingdom of Cochin, British India (present day Ernakulam, Kerala, India)
- Party: Indian National Congress (1978–2022) Independent Since 2022
- Spouse: Sherly Thomas
- Children: 3
- Parents: K. D. Varkey (father); Rosa Varkey (mother)
- Education: Sacred Heart College, Thevara

Kurupassery Varkey Thomas (born 10 May 1946) is an Indian politician from Kumbalangi in Ernakulam district, Kerala, India. He represented Ernakulam Constituency from 1984 to 1996 and further from 2009 to 2019. He was the Minister of State in the Ministry of Agriculture and Minister of State - Independent Charge in the Ministry of Consumer Affairs, Food and Public Distribution, 2nd UPA Government; a member of the Indian Parliament; and was a member of All India Congress Committee from 1984 to 2022. Thomas was also Minister of Tourism, Fisheries & Excise in the A.K. Antony Ministry in Kerala from 2001 to 2005 and was also Member of Legislative Assembly representing Ernakulam from 2001 till 2009. He is now the Special Representative of Government of Kerala at New Delhi with Cabinet rank.

== Personal life ==
K. V. Thomas was born to K. D. Varkey and Rose Varkey on 10 May 1946 in Latin Catholic Family. He has two elder brothers, Dr. K. V. Peter and K. V. Joseph. He is married to Sherly Thomas. They have a daughter and two sons.

== Career ==
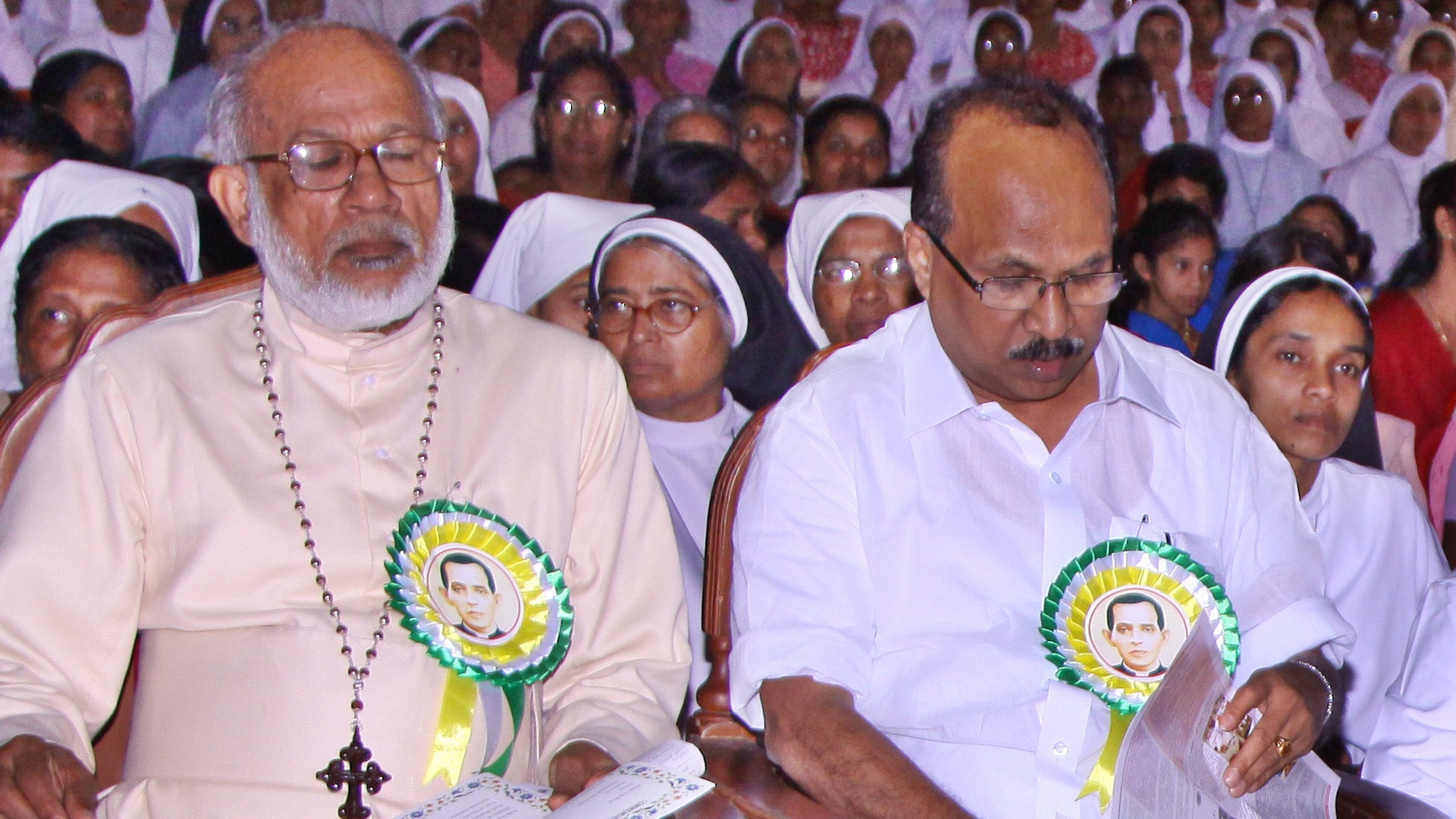
K. V. Thomas with Syro-Malabar Major Archbishop Mar George Alencherry during the 135th birth anniversary of Venerable Mar Varghese Payyappilly.

Thomas was a member of the 11th (2001-2006) and 12th (2006-2009) Kerala Legislative Assembly representing the Ernakulam assembly constituency. While contesting the 2009 Indian general election he was an MLA from Ernakulam . He served as the Minister for Excise and Tourism and Minister for Tourism and Fisheries between 2001 and 2004 in Government of Kerala. Thomas was a member of Lok Sabha from 1984 to 1996 and then from 2009 to 2019. During his long political career he held several positions like President, 7th Ward Congress Committee (1970–75); Convener, Block Youth Congress, Palluruthy (1971–80); General Secretary. Cochin Taluk INTUC (1971–76), Kerala INTUC (1986–91), DCC Ernakulam (1978–86); Treasurer, KPCC (1991–96); President of Ernakulam District Congress (I) Committee; KPCC Working President, Member of KPCC; Member of Kerala State Election Congress (I) Committee; Organising Secretary & General Secretary of INTUC (Kerala); AICC Observer to Tamil Nadu, Karnataka, Andhra Pradesh and Lakshadweep. He is also a member of General Council of INTUC (trade union wing of the Indian National Congress) since 1976. He served as the chairman of PAC (Public Accounts Committee) for three years from 2014 to 2017.

On 10 April 2022, Thomas attended a seminar in Communist Party of India (Marxist)'s 23rd party Congress in Kannur. For this he was officially removed from key party posts. In May 2022, shortly after attending an election campaign of the Left Democratic Front in Kochi, he was expelled from the Congress party for alleged anti-party activities.

== Education ==
Thomas holds a MSc degree in Chemistry and was a Professor of Chemistry for a period of 33 years at Sacred Heart College, Thevara. He served as the Head of the Department (Chemistry) from 1 June 1999 to 31 May 2001.

Other positions that Thomas held include Member of Defence Consultative Committee; Member of Civil Aviation and Tourism Consultative Committee; Court Member of Jawaharlal Nehru University, New Delhi and Pondicherry University; Director Board Member of Marine Products Export Development Authority; Director of Cochin International Airport Limited; President of All Kerala Ration Dealers Association; Working President of Indian Rare Earth Employees Congress; Chairman of Indira Gandhi Co-operative Hospital, Ernakulam (1994–96), Member of Official Language Committee of the Kerala Legislative Assembly (2004–06).

== Biography ==
Thomas is the author of several books. His first book, Ente Kumbalangi, which is about his native village Kumbalangi, was released on 17 November 2004. Since then he has published five more books.

Preceded by Sebastian Paul	Member of Parliament from Ernakulam; 2009 – 2019	Succeeded by Hibi Eden
