= T. J. Vinod =

Indian politician

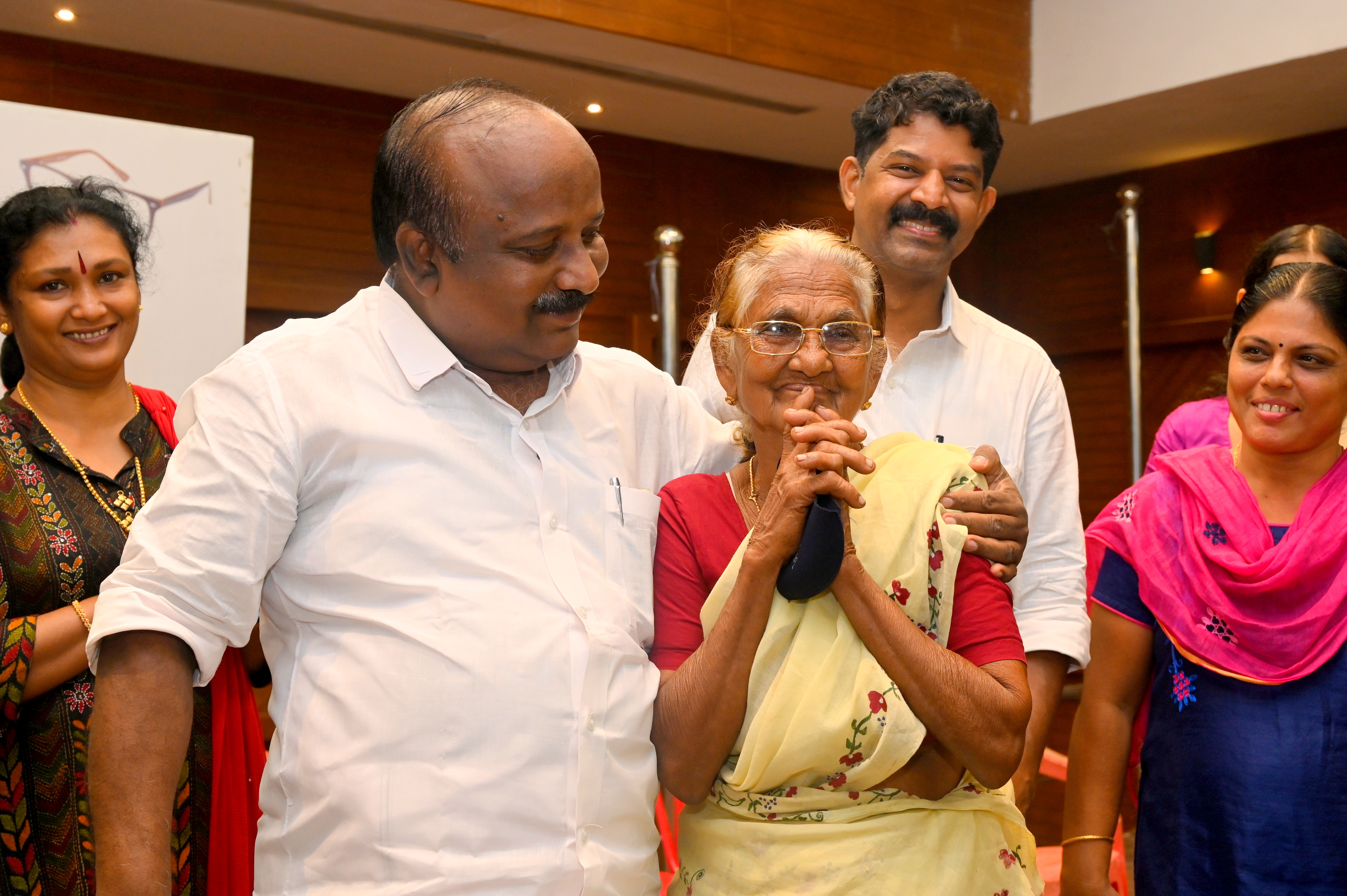
- T. J. Vinod, MLA from Ernakulam

Member of the Kerala Legislative Assembly
- Incumbent
- Assumed office 2019
- Preceded by: Hibi Eden
- Constituency: Ernakulam, Kerala

Personal details
- Born: April 6, 1963 (age 63) Palarivattom, Ernakulam, Kerala, India
- Party: Indian National Congress
- Spouse: Shimitha Vinod
- Children: Sneha Vinod, Varun Vinod
- Parent(s): T. M. Joseph (father), Celin Joseph (mother)
- Education: St. Paul’s College, Kalamassery (B.Com)
- Occupation: Politician

Thaivelikkakath Joseph Vinod (born 6 April 1963) is an Indian politician from the Indian National Congress, currently serving as the Member of the Legislative Assembly (MLA) representing the Ernakulam State Assembly constituency. A senior Congress leader from Ernakulam district, he has also served as the Deputy Mayor of the Kochi Municipal Corporation and as the President of the District Congress Committee (DCC) Ernakulam. Vinod is known for his grassroots political work, youth leadership, and civic development initiatives in the Kochi region.

== Early life and education ==
T. J. Vinod was born on 6 April 1963 in Palarivattom, Ernakulam, Kerala, to Celin and T. M. Joseph of the Thaivelikkakath house. He belongs to the Latin Catholic community.

He completed his schooling at St. Rita’s Public School, Ponnuruthy, and his pre-degree course at Vidyaniketan College, Kacherippady, Ernakulam. He graduated with a Bachelor of Commerce (B.Com) degree from St. Paul’s College, Kalamassery, between 1982 and 1985.

During his college years, he was active in student politics through the Kerala Students Union (KSU), the student wing of the Indian National Congress.

== Family and personal life ==
T. J. Vinod is married to Shimitha Vinod. The couple has two children, Sneha Vinod and Varun Vinod, both graduates of the Rajagiri School of Engineering and Technology, Kakkanad. His hobbies include watching football and cricket. He has also been serving as the District President of the Archery Association since 2007.

== Political career ==
=== Student politics ===
Vinod entered active politics in 1982 as a member of the Kerala Students Union (KSU). He held several positions in the organization:

- 1982–1983 – KSU Unit President, St. Paul’s College, Kalamassery
- 1983–1985 – KSU General Secretary, Kochi City
- 1983–1985 – Elected College Union Chairman, St. Paul’s College, Kalamassery (two terms)

=== Growth in the Indian National Congress ===
After his student politics phase, he continued to serve in the Congress organisation at various levels.

- 1985–1993 – KSU Ernakulam District General Secretary
- 1993–2002 – Youth Congress Ernakulam District General Secretary
- 1992 – Elected Member, District Congress Committee (DCC), Ernakulam
- 2004–2015 – General Secretary, DCC Ernakulam
- 12 December 2016 – 2019 – President, DCC Ernakulam

== Municipal career ==
Vinod has served in the Kochi Municipal Corporation for over two decades:

- 1995–2019 – Municipal Councillor (Divisions: Palarivattom and Karanakodam)
- 2010–2015 – Chairman, Development Standing Committee
- Deputy Mayor, Kochi Municipal Corporation (two terms):
  - 20 November 2002 – 22 August 2003
  - 2015 – 2019

== Legislative career ==
T. J. Vinod was elected to the Kerala Legislative Assembly in 2019 from the Ernakulam constituency, succeeding Hibi Eden, who was elected to the Lok Sabha from Ernakulam. He continues to represent the constituency in the 15th Kerala Legislative Assembly (2021–present).

=== Committee memberships ===
He is a member of the following legislative committees in the 15th Kerala Legislative Assembly:

- Committee on the Welfare of Senior Citizens
- Committee on the Welfare of Backward Classes
- Subject Committee on Local Self-Government

== Developmental and welfare initiatives ==
As MLA of Ernakulam, Vinod has supported a number of development and social welfare projects, including:

- Vaduthala Railway Overbridge (ROB) – a major KIIFB-funded project aimed at reducing traffic congestion in Kochi.
- Chernallur Drinking Water Project – improving access to safe drinking water.
- Vaduthala - Perandoor Bridge – improving transport connectivity in the region.
- KSRTC Bus Stand Redevelopment (Ernakulam) – modernization project under progress.
- Good Morning Ernakulam' – breakfast programme for schoolchildren in the constituency.
- MLA Cup – Football Tournament Against Drugs – youth engagement and anti-drug campaign through sports.
- Karuthalayi Ernakulam – a series of medical camps and health awareness programmes.

=== 2021 ===
There were 1,64,534 registered voters in Ernakulam Assembly constituency for the 2021 Kerala Assembly election.

2021 Kerala Legislative Assembly election: Ernakulam
Party	Candidate	Votes	%	±%
INC	T. J. Vinod	45,930	41.72	▲0.59
LDF	Shaji George	34,960	31.75	▼6.21
BJP	Padmaja S. Menon	16,043	14.57	▼0.28
Twenty 20 Party	Leslie Pallath	10,634	9.66	New
NOTA	None of the above	712	0.64	
Margin of victory		10,970	9.97	▲5.8
Turnout		1,08,434	66.92	▲9.01
INC hold		Swing	▲0.59	

== See also ==
- Ernakulam Assembly constituency
- Kerala Legislative Assembly
- Indian National Congress
