= Kizhakkambalam =

Suburb in Kerala, India

- Suburb
- Kizhakkambalam

- Location in Kerala, India Kizhakkambalam (India)
- Coordinates: 10°2′0″N 76°24′0″E
- Country: India
- State: Kerala
- District: Ernakulam

Government
  - Body: Kizhakkambalam Panchayath

Area
  - Total: 32 km^{2} (12 sq mi)
- Elevation: 12 m (39 ft)

Population (2011)
  - Total: 23,186
  - Density: 1,000/km^{2} (2,600/sq mi)

Languages
  - Official: Malayalam, English
- Time zone: UTC+5:30 (IST)
- PIN: 683562
- Telephone code: 0484
- Vehicle registration: KL-40
- 2011 census code: 627951
- Nearest city: Kochi
- Lok Sabha constituency: Chalakkudy
- Civic agency: Kizhakkambalam Panchayath
- Climate: Tropical monsoon (Köppen)
- Avg. summer temperature: 35 °C (95 °F)
- Avg. winter temperature: 20 °C (68 °F)

Kizhakkambalam is an eastern suburb of the Kochi in Kunnathunad Tehsil, Ernakulam district, Kerala, India. It is regarded as a model panchayat for its various development activities and is a part of the Kunnathunad tehsil of the Ernakulam district.

== Demographics ==
Kizhakkambalam has a large Christian population with the Jacobite and Catholic denominations in the majority. and its official language is Malayalam. The area was originally a farming village, but the majority now work in secondary and tertiary industries. Corporations such as Anna, Kitex, Sevana, KG Packers, Blackcat, and Wireropes employ approximately 40% of local workers in corporate-related work. The amusement park Wonderla Kochi is located 3 km away from Kizhakkambalam. Some people believe that Kizhakkambalam's name came from a kahzak (meaning a hanging tree for the death sentence) that stood in the suburb in ancient times; others believe the name Kizhakkambalam came from the Kizhakkambalam Temple (Ambalam) located in the (Kizhak) east from Thrikkakara Temple.

The total geographical area of village is 2281 hectares. Kizhakkambalam has a total population of 23,186 peoples. There are about 5,551 houses in Kizhakkambalam village. Perumbavoor is nearest town to Kizhakkambalam which is approximately 13 km away.

Demographics (2011 Census)
	Total	Male	Female
Population	23186	11375	11811
Children aged below 6 years	2254	1119	1135
Scheduled caste	2167	1072	1095
Scheduled tribe	71	27	44
Literates	19830	9918	9912
Workers (all)	9075	6430	2645
Main workers (total)	7575	5692	1883
Main workers: Cultivators	434	363	71
Main workers: Agricultural labourers	467	323	144
Main workers: Household industry workers	119	92	27
Main workers: Other	6555	4914	1641
Marginal workers (total)	1500	738	762
Marginal workers: Cultivators	180	128	52
Marginal workers: Agricultural labourers	178	93	85
Marginal workers: Household industry workers	28	17	11
Marginal workers: Others	1114	500	614
Non-workers	14111	4945	9166

== Administration ==
Kizhakkambalam Panchayath is ruled by an organization called Twenty-20, which is sponsored by the commercial organization Kitex. In the local governing body election held in November 2015, 17 out of 19 wards of the local panchayat were won by Twenty-20. The aim of this organization is to make Kizhakkambalam a role model village by 2020. In the mean time there is several allegations that Twenty -20 is misusing Corporate responsibility fund of Kitex group for political gain. They spearheaded many infrastructure projects, such as roads and drinking water, inside the village. The organization also led an anti-alcohol campaign.

== Famous Personalities ==
PR Sreejesh- Indian Professional field hockey player

Sabu M Jacob-Indian Business Man
