= Mulamkuzhi =

mulamkuzhy
- Village
- Location in Kerala, India
- Coordinates: 9°56′21″N 76°14′55″E
- Country: India
- State: Kerala
- District: Ernakulam

Languages
  - Official: Malayalam, English
- Time zone: UTC+5:30 (IST)
- PIN: 683587
- Nearest city: kochi
- Lok Sabha constituency: ernakulam

Mulamkuzhi (Malayalam:(മൂലംകുഴി) is situated in Ernakulam district.
