= Sacred Heart College, Kochi =

Higher education institution

Sacred Heart College, Kochi is a premier, first grade Arts, Science, and Commerce College affiliated to Mahatma Gandhi University, Kottayam. It was established in 1944.

In the year 2000, the college was accredited by the National Accreditation and Assessment Council (NAAC) at the Five Star level, and in 2013 it was re accredited at the A level. It has 25 undergraduate and 18 postgraduate programmes, 1 Integrated PG programme and a range of diploma and certificate courses. The college has three campuses in Thevara: Lakeview Campus (Main Campus), East Campus, and Media Campus (SH School of Communication). The current Principal is Dr. Franklin J.

== History ==
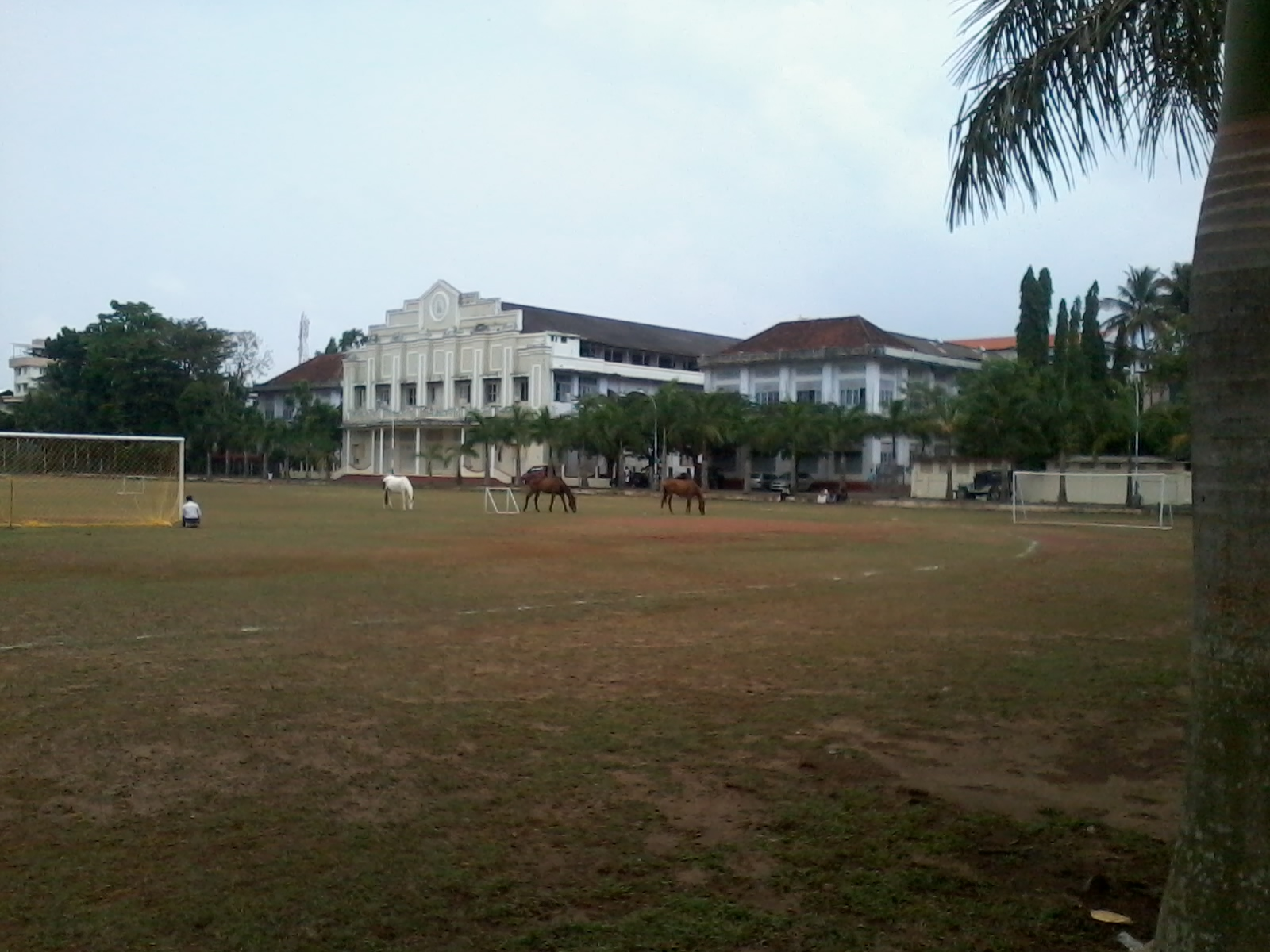
Sacred Heart College, Thevara

Sacred Heart College, Kochi was established in 1944 by the Sacred Heart Monastery, Thevara, Kochi a unit of the CMI (Carmelites of Mary Immaculate) Congregation. In 1958 the college was affiliated to the University of Kerala. In 1983 the college comes under Mahatma Gandhi University, Kottayam. In 2014 the college, under the principalship of Prasant Payyappilly Palakkappilly CMI, became one of the first five autonomous colleges in Kerala.

== UG Programmes (Honours) ==
=== Arts ===
- B.A Economics
- B.A Sociology
- B.A English (Specialisation in Film Studies & Cultural Studies)
- B.A. English (Specialisation in New Media) - Self-Financing
- B.A. Visual Communication - Self-Financing
- B.A. Animation and Graphic Design - Self-Financing
- B.A. Animation and Visual Effects - Self-Financing
- B.A. Mass Communication and Journalism - Self-Financing

=== Science ===
- B.Sc. Botany
- B.Sc. Chemistry
- B.Sc. Computer Applications - Self-Financing
- B.Sc. Mathematics
- B.Sc. Physics
- B.Sc. Zoology
- B.Sc. Psychology - Self-Financing
- B.Sc. Economics (Interdisciplinary) - Self-Financing
- BCA (Specialisation in Mobile Applications and Cloud Technology) - Self-Financing

=== Commerce & Management ===
- B.Com (Finance & Taxation) - Aided and Self-Financing
- B.Com (Finance & Accounting - Self-Financing
- B.Com (Business Analytics) - Self-Financing
- B.Com. (Fintech)- Self-Financing
- B.Com (Global Trade & International Tourism) - Self-Financing
- BBA (Integrated Marketing & New Media) - Self-Financing
- BBA (Business Analytics) - Self-Financing
- BBA (Logistics & Supply Chain Management) - Self-Financing

=== Languages (Foundation Courses) ===
- English
- Sanskrit
- Malayalam
- Hindi
- French

== PG Programmes ==
=== Arts ===
- MA Economics
- MA English Language and Literature - Aided & Self-Financing
- MA Multimedia - Self-Financing
- MA Graphic Design - Self-Financing
- MCJ - Self-Financing
- MA Digital Animation - Self-Financing
- Master of Social Work - Self-Financing

=== Science ===
- M. Sc. Aquaculture (Self Financing)
- M. Sc. Botany
- M. Sc. Chemistry
- M. Sc. Applied Chemistry
- M. Sc. Mathematics
- M. Sc. Physics
- M. Sc. Zoology
- M. Sc. Environmental Science - Self-Financing
- M. Sc. Psychology - Self-Financing
- M. Sc. Computer science (Artificial Intelligence)

=== Commerce ===
- M. Com

== Notable alumni ==
- V. D. Satheesan, Politician, Chief Minister of Kerala
- Justice Devan Ramachandran, Judge, High Court of Kerala
- Mammootty, Actor and Film Producer, Indian Film Industry
- M. M. Jacob, Former Governor of Arunachal Pradhesh
- K M Mani, Politician, Former Finance Minister, Kerala.
- P. P. Thankachan, Politician, Former Minister for Agriculture, Kerala.
- Sachin Baby, Cricketer
- K. V. Thomas, Politician, Member of the 16th Lok Sabha Former Union Minister.
- Hibi Eden, Politician, Member of the Parliament of India
- P. J. Joseph, Politician, Member of the Legislative Assembly of Kerala
- P. C. George, Politician, Former Member of the Legislative Assembly of Kerala
- Soumini Jain, Former Mayor, Corporation of Kochi
- Krishna (Malayalam actor)
- Sijoy Varghese, Actor, Ad Film Director
- Deepak Dev, Music director, Singer, Producer
- Srinda Arhaan, Actress
- Aswathi Menon, Actress
- Appu Krishnan, Music Producer, Song Writer
- Krishna Praba, Actress
- Malavika Krishnadas, Anchor, Actress, Dancer
- Mamitha Baiju, Actor, Dancer
