= Kakatiya Mega Textile Park =

Under-construction textile park in Telangana, India

- Native name: కాకతీయ మెగా టెక్స్‌టైల్ పార్కు
- Type: Government owned
- Industry: Textile Industrial Complex
- Headquarters: Warangal, Telangana, India
- Area served: 2000 Acres
- Owner: Government of Telangana

Kakatiya Mega Textile Park (Warangal Textile Park) is an under-construction textile park to come up in Warangal district, Telangana, India. The proposed 'cotton-to-garment' park will be set up in an area of 2,000 – 3,000 acres, with a vision to have a "fibre to fabric (end-to-end)" facility. Out of which, 1,357 acres is already acquired and being attached to TSIIC.

== History ==
The biggest textile Park in India, foundation stone laid on 22 October 2017 at Shyamapet in Gesugonda mandal of Warangal Rural district, Telangana by the then Chief Minister of Telangana, Kalvakuntla Chandrashekhar Rao.

The Kakatiya Mega Textile Park (KMTP) is located at Shayampet Village of Geesukonda Mandal and Chintalapalli Village of Sangem Mandal. The Kakatiya Mega Textile Park shall offer industrial space for Textile and Apparel Industry with state-of-art manufacturing facilities and integrated common infrastructure. The Park is being developed on a vertically integrated model to cover complete Textiles value chain.

== The Park ==
Along with the 22 firms that signed MOU's with the Telangana government for Rs.3900 crore investments in the textile park, Tiruvuru Exporters Association (TEA) has also proposed to set up 10 units in the park. It has a potential to create 75,000 direct employment and 25,000 indirect employment.

The basic concept of the Park is to offer complete manufacturing eco-system for Textiles and Apparel Industry within its premises. The 1190 acres of land is being developed and implemented in a phased manner.

The total project cost is envisaged at Rs. 1,075 Cr and the development of the mega textile park is proposed in phases based on demand and requirement from the textile/apparel industry.

KMTP (Kakatiya Mega Textile Park) park is the largest textile park in India in terms of area and possible generation of 184,539 employment.

The investments in the Textile Park is estimated to be more than Rs. 9,000 crores including cost of infrastructure and common facilities, factory buildings, plant and machinery and other social infrastructure.

The KMTP would facilitate production of products across the Textile value chain ranging from spinning, weaving, knitting, processing and readymade garments/ made-ups. The total value addition potential of the KMTP is Rs. 7,000 crores per annum.

Kitex textiles manufacturing group, from Kerala, has also started talks with Telangana government for a planned investment of over 1000 crores in the park, for the factory.
