= Uma Thomas =

Indian politician

Member of Kerala Legislative Assembly
- Incumbent
- Assumed office 2022
- Preceded by: P. T. Thomas
- Constituency: Thrikkakara

Personal details
- Born: 28 May 1965 (age 60) Ernakulam, Kerala, India
- Party: Indian National Congress
- Spouse: P. T. Thomas
- Children: Vishnu Thomas; Vivek Thomas
- Parent(s): S. Hariharan; Thankam Hariharan

Uma Thomas is an Indian politician from Kerala. She is a member of the Kerala Legislative Assembly, from Thrikkakkara Assembly constituency in Ernakulam district representing Indian National Congress.

Thomas first became an MLA winning the 2022 Thrikkakara byelections with a margin of 25,016 votes, which were held due to the death of her husband P. T. Thomas. Then, Uma Thomas was the lone woman member from INC in Kerala Legislative Assembly.

She retained the seat for the Congress in the 2026 Kerala Legislative Assembly election from Thrikkakkara. She polled 83,375 votes and defeated her nearest rival, Pushpa Das of the CPI (M), by a margin of 50,211 votes. She recorded the highest margin of victory among the 11 women winners in 2026.

== Accident ==
She fell from 20 feet height from a temporary stage set up in the Jawaharlal Nehru International Stadium Kochi on 29 December 2024. The Mridanga Vision and Oscar Events had organized a Bharatnatyam event in a bid for Guinness Book of World Record.
