= V. Viswanatha Menon =

Indian politician (1927–2019)

Vadakkoot Viswanatha Menon, also known as Ambadi Viswam (15 January 1927 – 3 May 2019), was an Indian politician and was the former minister in the southern state of Kerala in India. He had also served as a member in the Indian Parliament.

In the early 2000s, Viswanatha Menon distanced himself from the CPI(M) due to difference of opinion on party policies. He contested from Ernakulam constituency to Lok Sabha with support from the Bharatiya Janata Party and a rebel CPI(M) splinter group in 2004 and was defeated by Dr. Sebastian Paul.

== Early life ==
Viswanatha Menon was born in Kochi as the son of Narayana Menon, a lawyer, and Vadakkoot Lakshmikkuttiyamma. His father belonged to Ambadi, a famous Nair family of Cochin.

He was a political activist in his youth, accused in the Communist attack on the Edappally police station. He was a leader of the Communist Party of India (Marxist) in Kerala. Starting his career as a student activist in the Indian independence movement in his alma mater Maharaja's College, Ernakulam, he became popularly known as Ambadi Viswam among his peers, seniors and near ones.

Menon was one of the popular youth leaders in Kochi at that time, owing to his opinions and actions against the ruling elite. A follower of Mahatma Gandhi since childhood, he was inclined towards communism during his student days due to the influence of prominent personalities around him, including his cousin A. K. Damodaran, former Indian Administrative Service official.

At the last stage of his political career he quit CPM and joined the Bharathiya Janata Party and contested as a BJP Candidate in assembly elections in 2004.

== Career ==
V. Viswanatha Menon was one of the earliest members of the undivided Communist Party of India in Kochi and played an essential role in building its base during the colonial and post-colonial period of the 1940s and early 1950s. Having sacrificed his aristocratic lifestyle at his affluent family, he worked among the party ranks against the exploitation of the oppressed classes.

The caste system left the less fortunate castes never achieving equal treatment. This continuing injustice inspired Menon to adopt Socialism and later on Democracy, as a means of addressing these ills.

He was a two-time Member of Parliament representing CPI and later the CPI(M). He served as Finance Minister in the 1987 E.K. Nayanar-led Left Democratic Front Government. He once held the record of having presented the lengthiest Budget speech in the Kerala Legislative Assembly.

He served as trade union president in FACT for 12 years, and in Indal for 14 years. He also led a Cochin Port union.

During the early 2000s, he distanced himself from the CPI(M) due to difference of opinion on party policies. He contested from Ernakulam constituency to Lok Sabha with support from the Bharatiya Janata Party and a rebel CPI(M) splinter group in 2004 and was defeated by Dr. Sebastian Paul.
