= Henry Austin (Indian politician) =

Indian politician and diplomat

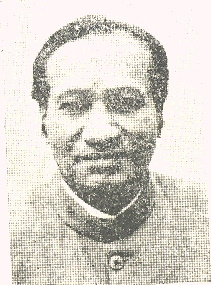

Former state and federal government minister

Personal details
- Born: 20 October 1920
- Died: 2008
- Party: Indian National Congress

Henry Austin (20 October 1920 – 15 May 2008) was an Indian politician, diplomat, and former state and federal government minister. He was also a veteran leader in the Indian National Congress, which is also known simply as the Congress Party.

== Biography ==
Austin was born on 20 October 1920. He attended school in Kollam before enrolling in St. Aloysius' College, a Jesuit college in Mangalore, Karnataka. He received his degree at the Arts College in Thiruvananthapuram, Kerala, before studying law at the Law College, which is also located in Thiruvananthapuram.

Henry Austin did his doctorate in International Relations from the Washington University. Although he was offered a position at the United Nations, he declined the offer and returned to India to pursue a career in Politics.

Austin served as KPCC General Secretary and then went on to become one among the only two general secretaries of the All India Congress Committee in 1971 under Indira Gandhi. The other General Secretary was Sankar Dayal Sharma, who later went on to become the President of India. He also travelled abroad as an Indian representative to lobby for support of India's position during the Bangladesh Liberation War. (India supported Bangladesh's secession from Pakistan). He earned the sobriquet "Giant Killer" in the 1965 assembly election after he defeated stalwart leader T.K. Divakaran at the hustings from Kollam assembly constituency. He was unable to swear in as an MLA since no government could be formed in 1965 as no party had a majority.

He won his first election to the Parliament of India from the Ernakulam Lok Sabha constituency in 1971 defeating V. Viswanatha Menon and was re-elected again in 1977 defeating K.N. Ravindranath. However, he failed in his re-election bid in 1980 due to a dispute with Xavier Arackal, a Congress Party member who was a supporter of Indira Gandhi, which split the Congress Party

Austin also became a minister in the government of former Prime Minister of India Charan Singh. He was in charge of civil and food supplies, a position which was the equivalent of the rank of state minister. Austin was named as India's ambassador to Portugal in 1985 by PM Rajiv Gandhi. He also served as member of Kerala State Minority Commission. As MP of Ernakulam he was instrumental in establishing the Cochin Shipyard in 1972 at Ernakulam, the shipyard is a major employer which employs thousands. He was also the prime mover to get the Ernakulam Bypass sanctioned and in developing the South and North railway stations. He had famously mooted the supertanker Berth off the Kochi coast, although it was years later when a bunkering terminal was established as part of Vallarpadam container terminal. Austin was visiting his daughter in Thiruvananthapuram when he began complaining of uneasiness. He died on his way to the hospital on 15 May 2008, at the age of 88. He was buried at the Infant Jesus Roman Catholic Church cemetery in Kochi, India.

Henry Austin was married to Grace. The couple had eight children –3 sons and 5 daughters.

Dr. Henry Austin's political legacy is being carried forward by his grandson, who is also named Henry Austin. He is currently the President of Indian National Congress, Ernakulam North Block Committee.
