= K. J. Maxi =

Indian politician

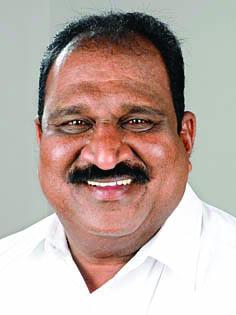

Member of the Kerala Legislative Assembly
- In office 2016–2026
- Constituency: Kochi

Personal details
- Party: Communist Party of India (Marxist)

K. J. Maxi is an Indian politician who served as a member of 14th Kerala Legislative Assembly. He represented Kochi constituency and belongs to Communist Party of India (Marxist).

Earlier, he served as the councillor at Kochi municipal corporation. K. J. Maxi started his political career through SFI. He was the state joint secretary SFI. Currently he is the CPI (M) District Committee Member and CITU District Committee Member.
