= Twenty 20 Party =

Indian political party

- Abbreviation: TTP
- Leader: Sabu M. Jacob
- Founder: Sabu M. Jacob
- Founded: 2015; 11 years ago
- Headquarters: Building No. IV/172, Ikkarnadu Panchayath, Kadayiruppu P.O., Kunnthunadu Taluk, Ernakulam — 682311
- Ideology: Welfarism
- Political position: Centre
- ECI status: Registered Unrecognised
- Alliance: National Democratic Alliance (2026–present); People's Welfare Alliance (2022–2023)
- Seats in Rajya Sabha: 0 / 09
- Seats in Lok Sabha: 0 / 20
- Seats in Kerala Legislative Assembly: 0 / 140

Election symbol
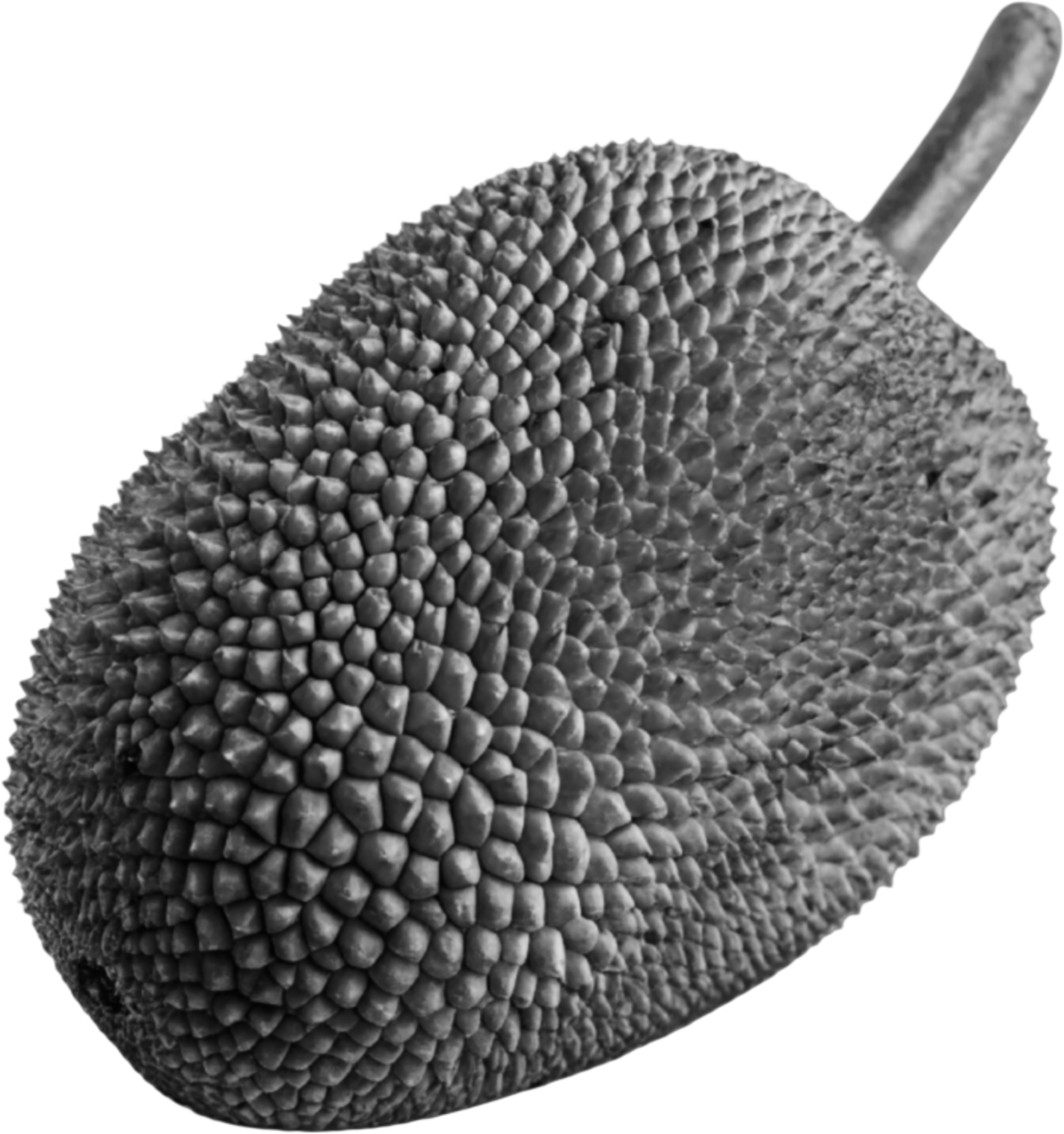

Party flag
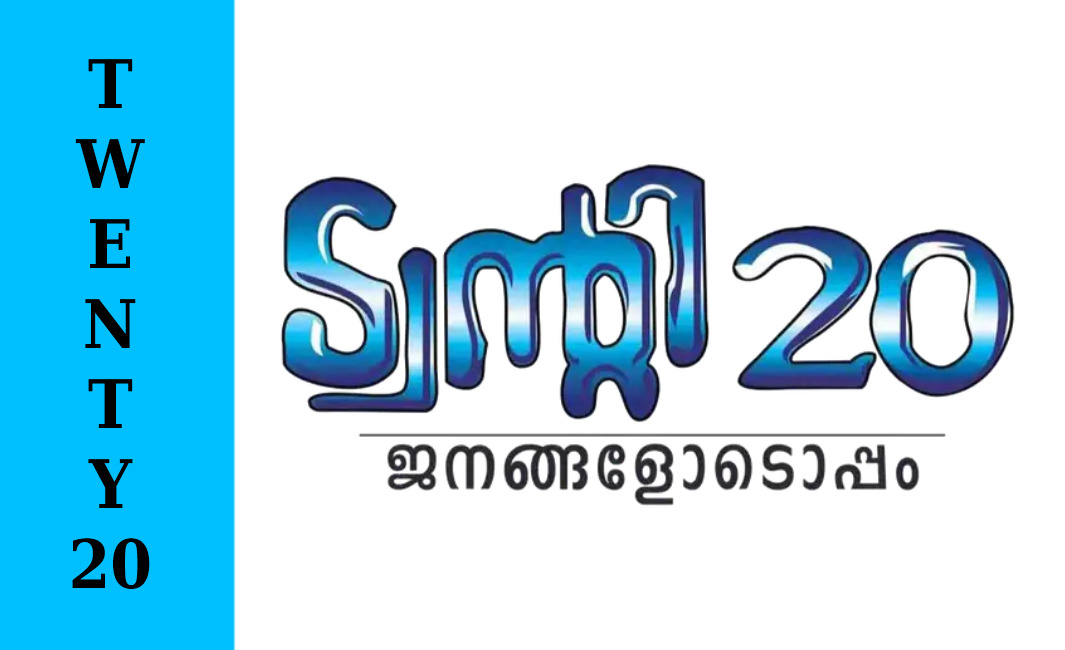

Twenty 20 Party is an Indian political party active in the state of Kerala. It originated as a corporate social responsibility initiative of the Anna Kitex Group, led by Sabu M. Jacob, at Kizhakkambalam in Ernakulam district. The party made its electoral debut in the 2015 Kerala local elections. It has a presence in Ernakulam district.

== History ==
Twenty 20 Party started as a nonprofit charitable organization promoted by the Kitex Garments, a garment exporting company part of the Anna Kitex Group—ranked in Forbes Asia's 200 Best Under A Billion Dollar companies. In the 2015 Grama Panchayat elections, the organization won 17 out of 19 seats in the village council and secured 69 percent of vote share. According to Sabu M. Jacob, the Managing Director of Kitex Garments, the victory was because of the failure of the prevailing political parties. Kitex Garments disbursed its Corporate Social Responsibility (CSR) funds for the development and welfare schemes undertaken by Twenty 20

Following its success in the 2015 local body elections, Twenty20 expanded its political activities beyond Kizhakkambalam and began participating more actively in Kerala’s regional politics. The movement later evolved into a registered political party with a broader political agenda and organizational structure.

=== Alliance ===
In May 2022, the party formed an alliance with Aam Aadmi Party under the name People's Welfare Alliance. The alliance was dissolved in December 2023.

In 2026, the Twenty20 Party became a part of the National Democratic Alliance, led by the Bharatiya Janata Party.

== Leadership ==
President Twenty20 Party
S.No.	Portrait	Name (Birth–Death)	Party Officer (Presidents)	Term in office		
S.No.	Portrait	Name (Birth–Death)	Party Officer (Presidents)	Assumed office	Left office	Time in office
1		Sabu M. Jacob (b. 11 May 1962)	President Twenty20 Party	11 May 2015	Incumbent	11 years and 6 months

== Electoral performance ==
Members of the Lok Sabha Keralam State
Election Year	Leader	Alliance	Seats contested	Seats won	+/- Seats	Popular Votes	Vote %	+/- Vote	Sitting side
2024	Sabu M. Jacob	None	2	0 / 20	New entry	1,45,450	0.75%	New entry	Others

Kerala Legislative Assembly Elections
Election Year	Leader	Alliance	Seats contested	Seats won	+/- Seats	Popular Votes	Votes %	+/- Vote	Sitting side
2021	Sabu M. Jacob	None	8	0 / 140	Steady	1,45,664	0.71%	New entry	Others
2026	Sabu M. Jacob	NDA	19	0 / 140	Steady	3,04,566	1.41%	▲0.70%	Others

Kerala Local Body Elections
Election Year	Leader	Alliance	Gram Panchayats	Block Panchayats	District Panchayats	Municipalities	Corporations	Total
2015	Sabu M. Jacob	None	1 / 941	0 / 152	0 / 14	0 / 87	0 / 6	1 / 1,200
2020	Sabu M. Jacob	None	4 / 941 ▲ (+3)	0 / 152 - (0)	0 / 14 - (0)	0 / 87 - (0)	0 / 6 - (0)	4 / 1,200 ▲ (+3)
2025	Sabu M. Jacob	None	2 / 941 ▼ (-2)	0 / 152 - (0)	0 / 14 - (0)	0 / 86 - (0)	0 / 6 - (0)	2 / 1,200 ▼ (-2)

== Controversies ==
Speaking to a section of media, KITEX group managing director Sabu M Jacob, who is also the chairman of Twenty20, said he was "forced" to buy electoral bonds for giving contributions to mainstream political parties as it was "essential for the existence of business ventures".

=== NDA alliance and internal dissent (2026) ===
In January 2026, the Twenty20 Party's decision to align with the National Democratic Alliance (NDA) led to internal dissent, with several leaders and office-bearers resigning from the party and joining the Indian National Congress. The dissidents alleged that the decision was taken without consultation with party bodies.

In April 2026, Pooja Jomon, president of the Poothrikka panchayat and a party member, resigned in protest against the alliance. She stated that the resignation followed disagreements over the alliance and alleged that party convenor Sabu M. Jacob had threatened her, including by referring to a previous party member who had died after an accident.

=== Akhil Marar's resignation ===
In July 2026, actor and film director Akhil Marar, who unsuccessfully contested the 2026 Kerala Legislative Assembly election as a Twenty20 candidate from Thrikkakara, resigned from the party and levelled allegations against its president, Sabu M. Jacob. Marar alleged that he had initially been promised the Kottarakkara constituency, followed by Thrippunithura, before eventually being fielded from Thrikkakara, which he claimed offered the party little chance of success. He also alleged that Jacob became unresponsive after the election. Marar further claimed that he had sold his motorcycle, valued at ₹20 lakh, for ₹10 lakh to finance his election campaign, although he said the campaign expenses were later reimbursed by the party.

Jacob rejected the allegations as baseless, stating that Twenty20 had fully funded the election campaigns of all its candidates. He acknowledged that Marar had sought to contest from Kottarakkara and Thrippunithura, but said Marar had agreed to contest from Thrikkakara after being informed that he was free to decline the candidature.
