= Dominic Presentation =

Indian politician

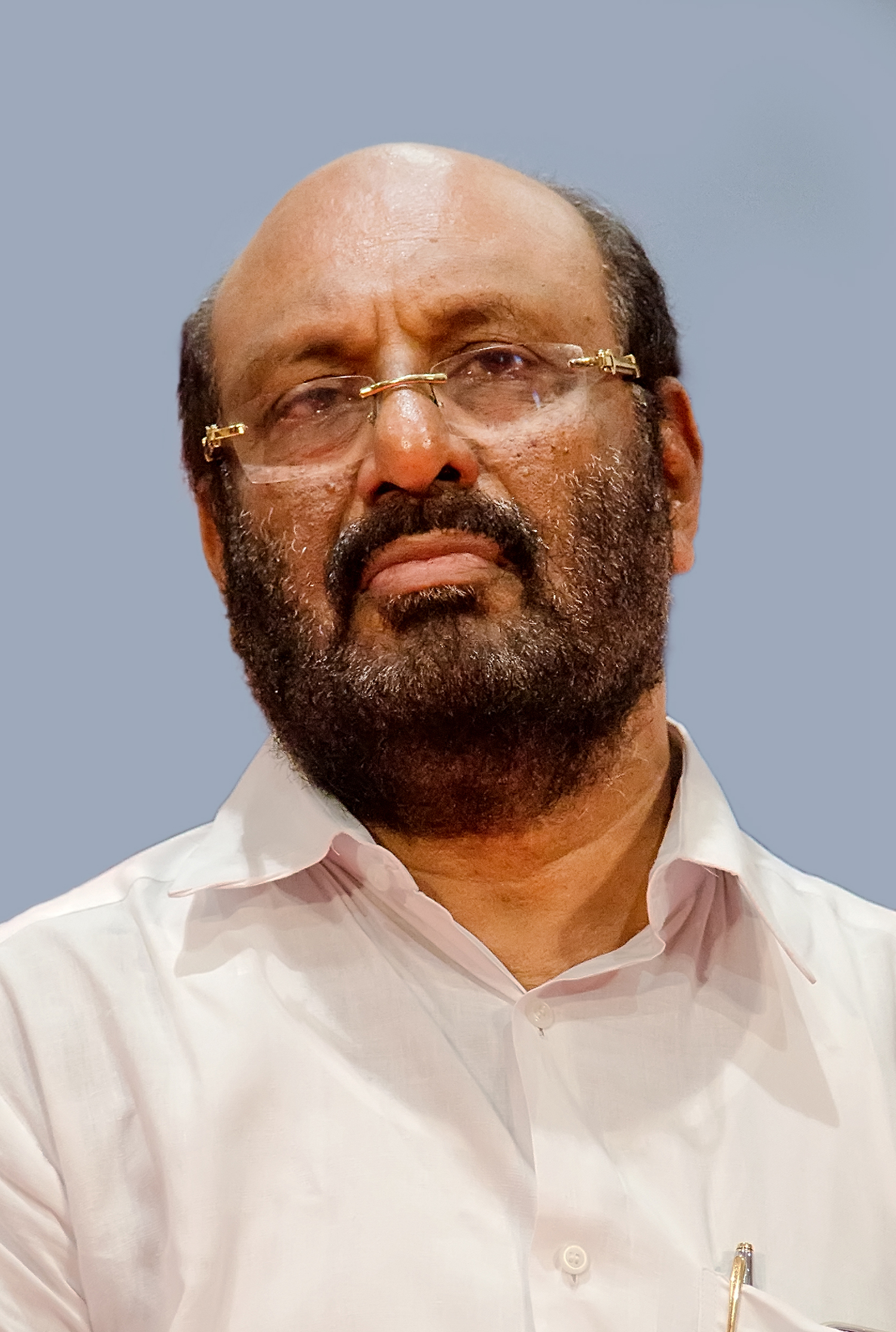
- Ex-Member of Legislative Assembly

MLA
- In office 2011–2016
- Constituency: Kochi

Personal details
- Born: 19 February 1949 (age 77) Kattoor
- Party: Indian National Congress
- Spouse: Dr. Mary Abraham
- Children: One Daughter

Dominic Presentation (born 19 February 1949) is an Indian politician, and was Member of Kerala Legislative Assembly from Kochi constituency Ernakulam district, Kerala, till 2016, Executive Member of Kerala Pradesh Congress Committee (K.P.C.C.) and Member of All India Congress Committee (AICC). He was the Minister of Fisheries, Sports, Airport and Welfare of Minorities in 11th Kerala Legislative Assembly headed by Oomman Chandy.

== Early life ==
He was born to Felix Presentation and Rosamma on 19 February 1949 at Kattoor.

== Career ==
He started his political career from school level. He served as the Secretary of Kerala Students Union, Ernakulam City, District President of Ernakulam - Kerala Students Union, National Committee Member of National Students Union of India, Chairman of St. Alberts College Union, Opposition Leader of Cochin Corporation Council in the year 1998, General Secretary of Ernakulam District Congress Committee and Executive Committee Member of Kerala University Union.
