= Nemom =

- Suburb
- Location in Kerala, India
- Coordinates: 8°27′28.42″N 76°59′57.82″E
- Country: India
- State: Kerala
- District: Thiruvananthapuram
- Zone: Nemom, Ponnumangalam
- Ward: 66, 67
- Talukas: Thiruvananthapuram taluk

Government
  - Body: Thiruvananthapuram Corporation
  - Nemom Ward Councilor (66): Deepika U, BJP
  - Ponnumangalam Ward Councilor (67): M.R.Gopan, BJP

Languages
  - Official: Malayalam, English
- Time zone: UTC+5:30 (IST)
- PIN: 695020
- Telephone code: 91 471
- Vehicle registration: KL-01
- Lok Sabha constituency: Trivandrum
- Vidhan Sabha constituency: Nemom
- Civic agency: Thiruvananthapuram Corporation

Nemom is a suburb of Thiruvananthapuram, the capital city of Kerala, India.

It is surrounded by Thirumala in the north, Malayinkeezhu in the north-east, Balaramapuram in the south-east, Kovalam in the south and Thiruvallam in the west. Nemom falls within the municipal corporation of Thiruvananthapuram, though partly exclusive. It is connected with Thiruvananthapuram, Neyyattinkara, Vizhinjam, Poovar, Kattakkada, Nagarcoil, and Kanyakumari through the main arterial highway National Highway 66.

Nemom has a Government Ayurveda Clinic. There is a public market at Pravachambalam, about one kilometre away from Nemom. Vellayani Devi Temple is located in Nemom.

== Administration ==
=== Parliamentary and Assembly constituencies ===
Nemom is part of Nemom Assembly constituency and Thiruvananthapuram Parliamentary constituency. After the 2024 Indian general election, Shashi Tharoor, MP of Indian National Congress represents Thiruvananthapuram in Lok Sabha. Rajeev Chandrasekhar, MLA of Bharatiya Janata Party is representing Nemom Assembly constituency in the Kerala Legislative Assembly after 2026 assembly election. He is also the state president of BJP Kerala. A prominent voice in India's digital and economic policy, he is a former Union Minister, having served as the Minister of State for the Ministry of Electronics and Information Technology (MeitY), the Ministry of Skill Development and Entrepreneurship, and the Ministry of Jal Shakti.

=== City corporation ===
Nemom consists of 2 wards of Thiruvananthapuram Corporation. The 54th ward is named Nemom, and the 55th is named Ponnumangalam. After the 2025 Kerala local elections, Sridevi S K of Bharatiya Janata Party (BJP) is the present councilor of the Ponnumangalam Corporation Division. Senior BJP leader M.R. Gopan is the councilor of Nemom Corporation Division. M.R. Gopan is the previous Leader of the Opposition in the Thiruvananthapuram Municipal Corporation during 2020-25 period.

=== Taluk ===
Nemom village comes under Thiruvananthapuram taluk of the four taluks of Thiruvananthapuram district namely Chirayinkeezhu, Neyyattinkara, Nedumangad and Thiruvananthapuram.

== Government offices ==
=== Central ===
- Nemom Post Office
- Thiruvananthapuram South Railway Station (formerly Nemom Railway Station)
- BSNL Telephone Exchange, Nemom
- Office of the Sub Divisional Engineer, BSNL

=== State & Panchayath ===
- Office of the Circle Inspector of Police (Nemom Police Station)
- Government Taluk Hospital, Santhivila, Nemom
- Thiruvananthapuram Corporation Zonal Office, Nemom
- Panchayath Agricultural Office (Krishi Bhavan), Nemom
- Village Office, Nemom
- Sub Registrar's Office, Nemom
- KSEB Section Office, Nemom
- PWD Section Office, Nemom
- Kerala State Handloom Development Corporation, Regional Office & Showroom, Nemom
- Government Ayurveda Dispensary, Nemom

== Educational institutions ==
- Sree Vidyadhiraja Homoeopathic Medical College
- Sree Vidyadhiraja Pharmacy College
- Victory Boy's Higher Secondary School
- Victory Girl's High School
- Tolstoy Memorial Public School, Santhivila
- New UPS, Santhivila
- Little Flower Convent, Vellayani Jn.
- Government UP School, Nemom
- Swami Vivekananda Mission Central School, Koliakode
- Government HS school Pappanamcode
- St. Antonys School, Karakkamandapam
- Vyasa Vidhyalayam, Nemom

== Places of worship ==
- Vellayani Devi Temple
- Thaliyadichapuram Sree Mahadeva Temple
- Maha Ganapathy Temple
- Alamvila Nagaraja Temple
- Elappikal Devi Temple
- Thrikkannapuram Sreekrishna Swami Temple
- Nemom Muslim Juma Masjid, Vellayani Jn.
- Assemblies of God Churches
- CSI Church Nemom, Nemom
- Kuruvani Juma Masjid

== Other major establishments ==
- Merryland Studio, the second film studio in Kerala, which played important roles in the history of Malayalam cinema, was opened in 1951 by veteran director-producer P. Subramaniam.
- Venus Engineering Works & Foundry Ltd., which is a bicycle parts manufacturing division of Metro Exporters, Mumbai.
- Ananthapuram Service Co-operative Bank Nemom
- Swaraj Grandhashala (Library), Nemom
- Nemom Service Co-operative Bank, Vellayani Jn.
- LS Asafoetida company, Nemom
