= Kattakada Assembly constituency =

Constituency of the Kerala legislative assembly in India

Kattakada
- Constituency No. 138 for the Kerala Legislative Assembly
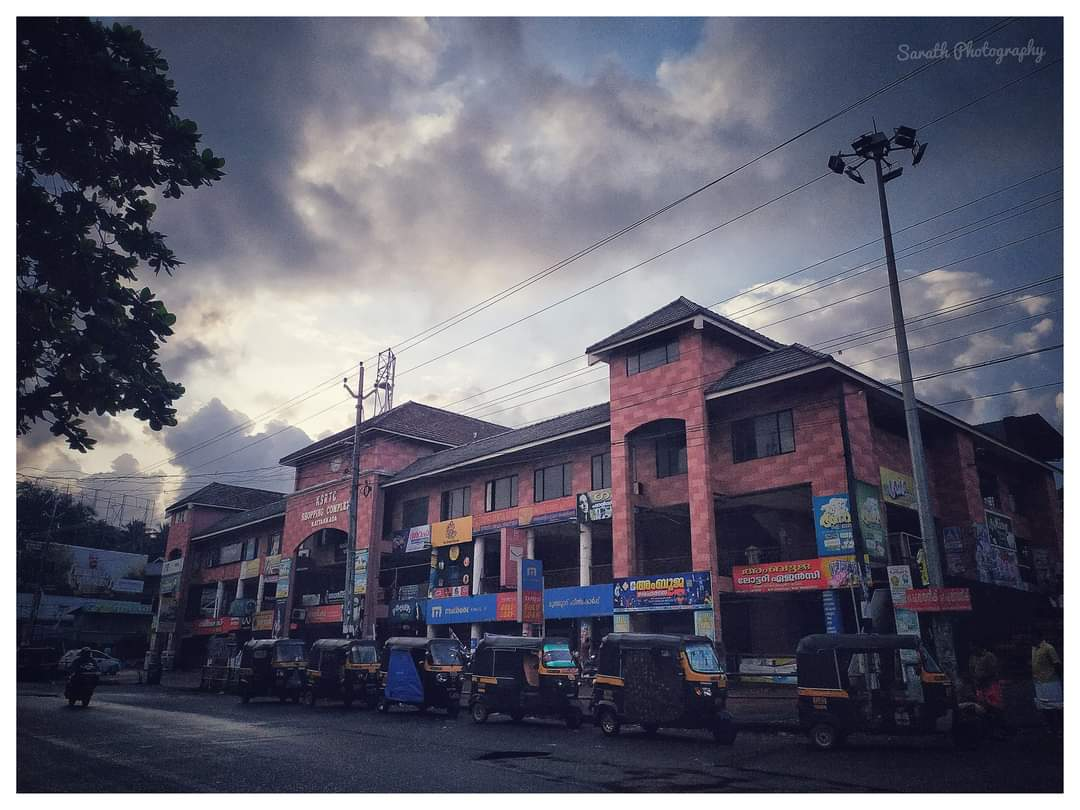
- Kattakada Bus Terminal and Shopping Complex

Constituency details
- Country: India
- Region: South India
- State: Kerala
- District: Thiruvananthapuram
- Lok Sabha constituency: Attingal
- Established: 2008
- Total electors: 1,96,792 (2021)
- Reservation: None

Member of Legislative Assembly
- 16th Kerala Legislative Assembly
- Incumbent M. R. Baiju
- Party: INC
- Elected year: 2026

Kattakada is one of the 140 state legislative assembly constituencies in Kerala in southern India. It is also one of the seven state legislative assembly constituencies included in Attingal Lok Sabha constituency. As of the 2026 assembly election, the current MLA is M.R Baiju of the INC.

== Local self-governed segments ==
Kattakada Assembly constituency is composed of the following local self-governed segments:

Sl no.	Name	Status (Grama panchayat/Municipality)	Taluk	Ruling alliance
1	Kattakada	Grama panchayat	Kattakada	LDF
2	Malayinkeezhu	Grama panchayat	Kattakada	UDF
3	Maranalloor	Grama panchayat	Kattakada	NDA
4	Vilappil	Grama panchayat	Kattakada	NDA
5	Vilavoorkkal	Grama panchayat	Kattakada	UDF
6	Pallichal	Grama panchayat	Neyyattinkara	LDF

== Members of the Legislative Assembly ==
The following list contains all members of Kerala Legislative Assembly who have represented the constituency:

Election	Name	Party
2011	N. Shakthan	Indian National Congress
2016	I. B. Sathish	Communist Party of India (Marxist)
2021	I. B. Sathish	Communist Party of India (Marxist)
2026	M. R. Baiju	Indian National Congress

== Election results ==
Percentage change (±%) denotes the change in the number of votes from the immediate previous election.

=== 2026 ===
2026 Kerala Legislative Assembly election: Kattakada
Party	Candidate	Votes	%	±%
INC	M. R. Baiju	56,846	38.87	▲9.32
CPI(M)	I. B. Sathish	49,710	33.99	▼11.50
BJP	P. K. Krishnadas	38,231	26.14	▲2.37
BSP	Nobil M D	433	0.30	▼0.13
CPI(ML)L	Adv. Jayakumar Theertham	262	0.18	−
NOTA	None of the above	762	0.52	▲0.04
Margin of victory		7,136	4.87	▼11.07
Turnout		1,46,244	82.20	▲7.81
INC gain from CPI(M)		Swing	-	

=== 2021 ===
There were 1,96,792 registered voters in Kattakkada Constituency for the 2021 Kerala Assembly election.

2021 Kerala Legislative Assembly election: Kattakada
Party	Candidate	Votes	%	±%
CPI(M)	I. B. Sathish	66,293	45.49	▲9.56
INC	Malayainkeezhu Venugopal	43,062	29.55	▼5.79
BJP	P. K. Krishnadas	34,642	23.77	▼3.17
NOTA	None of the above	701	0.48	▼0.03
BSP	Kandala Suresh	628	0.43	▼0.06
Independent politician	Sreekala Nadar	266	0.18	–
Independent politician	Syriac Damian V. P.	127	0.09	–
Margin of victory		23,231	15.94	▲15.35
Turnout		1,46,390	74.39	▼2.26
CPI(M) hold		Swing	▲9.56	

=== 2016 ===
There were 1,87,392 registered voters in the constituency for the 2016 Kerala Assembly election.

2016 Kerala Legislative Assembly election: Kattakada
Party	Candidate	Votes	%	±%
CPI(M)	I. B. Sathish	51,614	35.93	–
INC	N. Sakthan	50,765	35.34	▼9.29
BJP	P. K. Krishnadas	38,700	26.94	▲7.72
NOTA	None of the above	732	0.51	–
BSP	Biju S. R.	709	0.49	▼0.62
SDPI	Ashraf Pravachambalam	627	0.44	▼0.08
SUCI(C)	S. Mini	295	0.21	–
Independent	K. Sasikumar	192	0.13	–
Margin of victory		849	0.59	
Turnout		1,43,634	76.65	▲6.09
CPI(M) gain from INC		Swing	▼10.42	

=== 2011 ===
There were 1,66,306 registered voters in the constituency for the 2011 election.

2011 Kerala Legislative Assembly election: Kattakada
Party	Candidate	Votes	%	±%
INC	N. Shakthan	52,368	44.63	
Independent	M. V. Jayadali	39,452	33.62	
BJP	P. K. Krishnadas	22,550	19.22	
BSP	Vengode Sunil Kumar	1,303	1.11	
SDPI	Kattakada Rajan	613	0.52	
Independent	S. Sujithra	586	0.50	
Independent	Malayankeezh Rajesh	475	0.40	
Margin of victory		12,916	11.01	
Turnout		1,17,347	70.56	
INC win (new seat)				

== See also ==
- Kattakada
- Thiruvananthapuram district
- List of constituencies of the Kerala Legislative Assembly
- 2016 Kerala Legislative Assembly election
