= N. Sakthan =

Indian politician (born 1951)

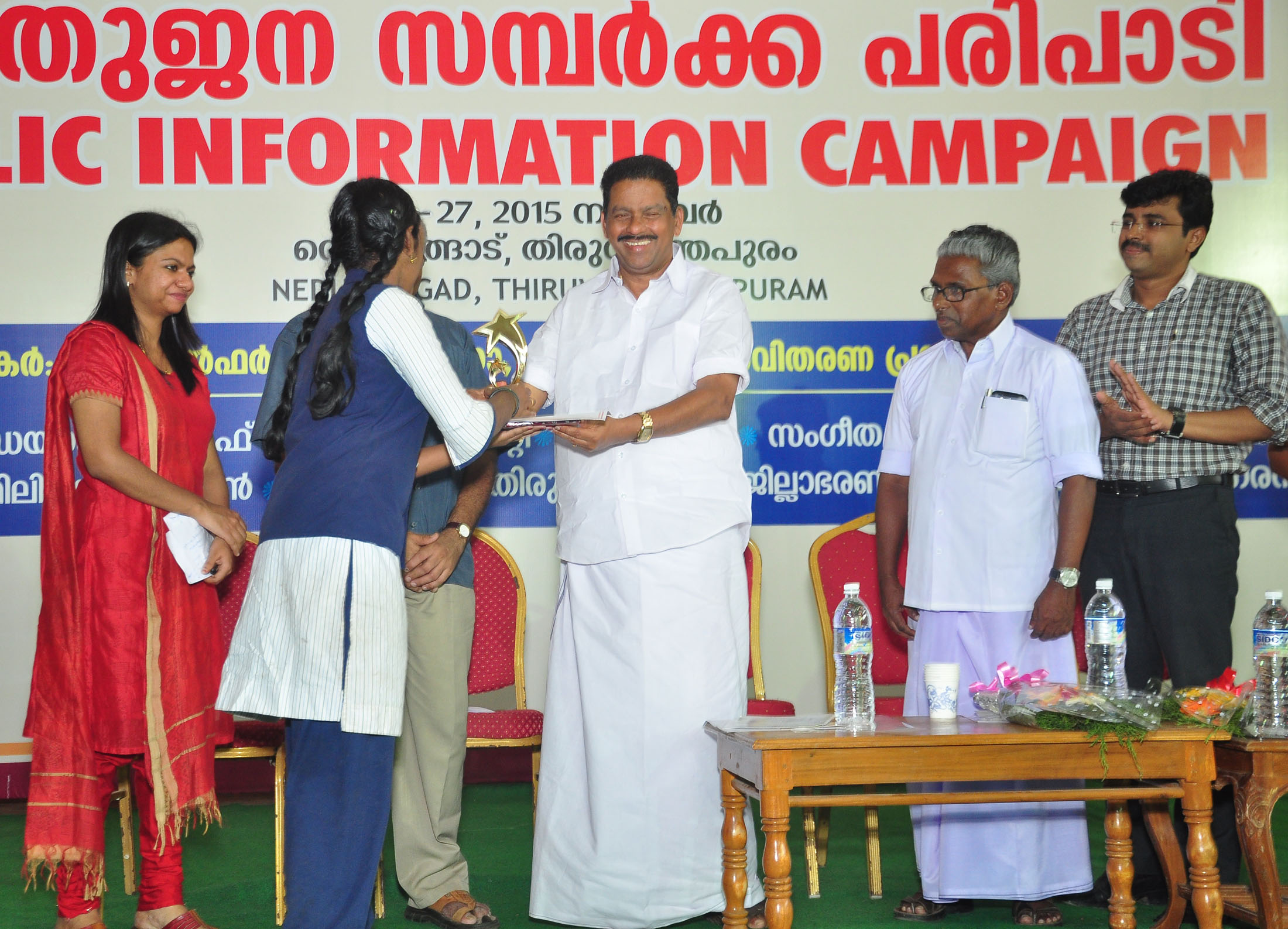

Speaker of the Kerala Legislative Assembly
- In office 12 March 2015 – 19 May 2016
- Chief Minister: Oommen Chandy
- Preceded by: G. Karthikeyan
- Succeeded by: P. Sreeramakrishnan
- Constituency: Kattakada

Minister for Transport, Government of Kerala
- In office 2004 – 2006
- Chief Minister: Oommen Chandy
- Preceded by: K. B. Ganesh Kumar
- Succeeded by: Mathew T. Thomas

Member of the Kerala Legislative Assembly
- Incumbent
- Assumed office 2026
- Preceded by: K. Ansalan
- Constituency: Neyyattinkara
- In office 2011 – 2016
- Preceded by: Constituency created
- Succeeded by: I. B. Satheesh
- Constituency: Kattakkada
- In office 2001 – 2011
- Preceded by: P. Bhaskaran Venganoor
- Succeeded by: V. Sivankutty
- Constituency: Nemom
- In office 1982 – 1987
- Preceded by: M.R Raghuchandrabal
- Succeeded by: Neelalohithadasan Nadar
- Constituency: Kovalam

Personal details
- Born: 5 May 1951 (age 75) Kanjiramkulam, Thiruvananthapuram, State of Travancore–Cochin (present day Kerala), India
- Party: Indian National Congress
- Spouse: Stella
- Children: 2
- Education: Government Law College, Thiruvananthapuram
- As of 9 Nov, 2012 Source: kerala.gov.in

Nalla Thambi Sakthan (born 5 May 1951) is an Indian politician who served as Speaker of the Kerala Legislative Assembly from 2015 to 2016. He is currently serving as a Member of the Legislative Assembly (MLA) from Neyyattinkara since 2026.

He previously served as an MLA from Kovalam (1982–87), Nemom (2001-11) and Kattakada (2011–16). He also served as Minister for Transport from 2004 to 2006 under Chief Minister Oommen Chandy.

== Personal life ==
Sakthan was born to Nalla Thampi and Y. Thankamma at Kanjiramkulam in the erstwhile State of Travancore–Cochin on 5 May 1951. He has completed Master of Arts (M.A) and Bachelor of Laws (L.L.B) degree. He married Smt. Stella and they have two daughters, Tintu and Dr. Tisha.

== Political career ==
N. Sakthan entered politics through Kerala Students Congress, the students wing of Kerala Congress. He was the treasurer of Trivandrum District Congress Committee (D.C.C.) during 1987–1993, DCC General Secretary during 1993–2000, Member, District Council during 1991–1994. Sakthan is a member of Kerala Pradesh Congress Committee (K.P.C.C.) executive and All India Congress Committee (AICC) from 2005.

Sakthan was elected to the Kerala Legislative Assembly as an Independent candidate in 1982 (Kovalam). Later he represented the Indian National Congress party and was re-elected to the assembly in 2001 and 2006 (Nemom) and in 2011 (Kattakada). In 2011, he first served as the pro-tem Speaker of the Assembly, and later was elected Deputy Speaker. When G. Karthikeyan, the speaker of Kerala Legislative Assembly died in office, Sakthan was elected to the post of Speaker, thus becoming the first person to serve in the posts of Pro tem Speaker, Deputy Speaker and Speaker, that too in a single assembly period. In 2016, he again contested from Kattakada, but then, he was defeated by I. B. Satheesh, a new contestant from CPI (M), by a margin of votes.

Year	Constituency	Closest rival	Result	Majority (votes)
1977	Kovalam	Neelalohithadasan Nadar (LDF-IND)	Lost	4,115
1982	Kovalam	M.R Raghuchandrabal (INC(I))	Won	3,357
1987	Kovalam	Neelalohithadasan Nadar (Lok Dal)	Lost	21.899
2001	Nemom	Venganoor P. Bhaskaran (CPI(M))	Won	8,357
2006	Nemom	Venganoor P. Bhaskaran (CPI(M))	Won	10,749
2011	Kattakkada	M.V Jaya Dali (LDF-IND)	Won	12,916
2016	Kattakkada	I. B. Sathish (CPI(M))	Lost	849
2026	Neyyattinkara	K. Ansalan (CPI(M))	Won	6,966
