= 2026 Kerala Legislative Assembly election =

Election in India

- 9 April 2026

All 140 seats in the Keralam Legislative Assembly 71 seats needed for a majority
- Opinion polls
- Registered: 27,142,952 (▼2%)
- Turnout: 79.53pp (▲4.1pp)
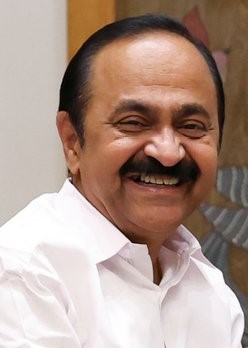

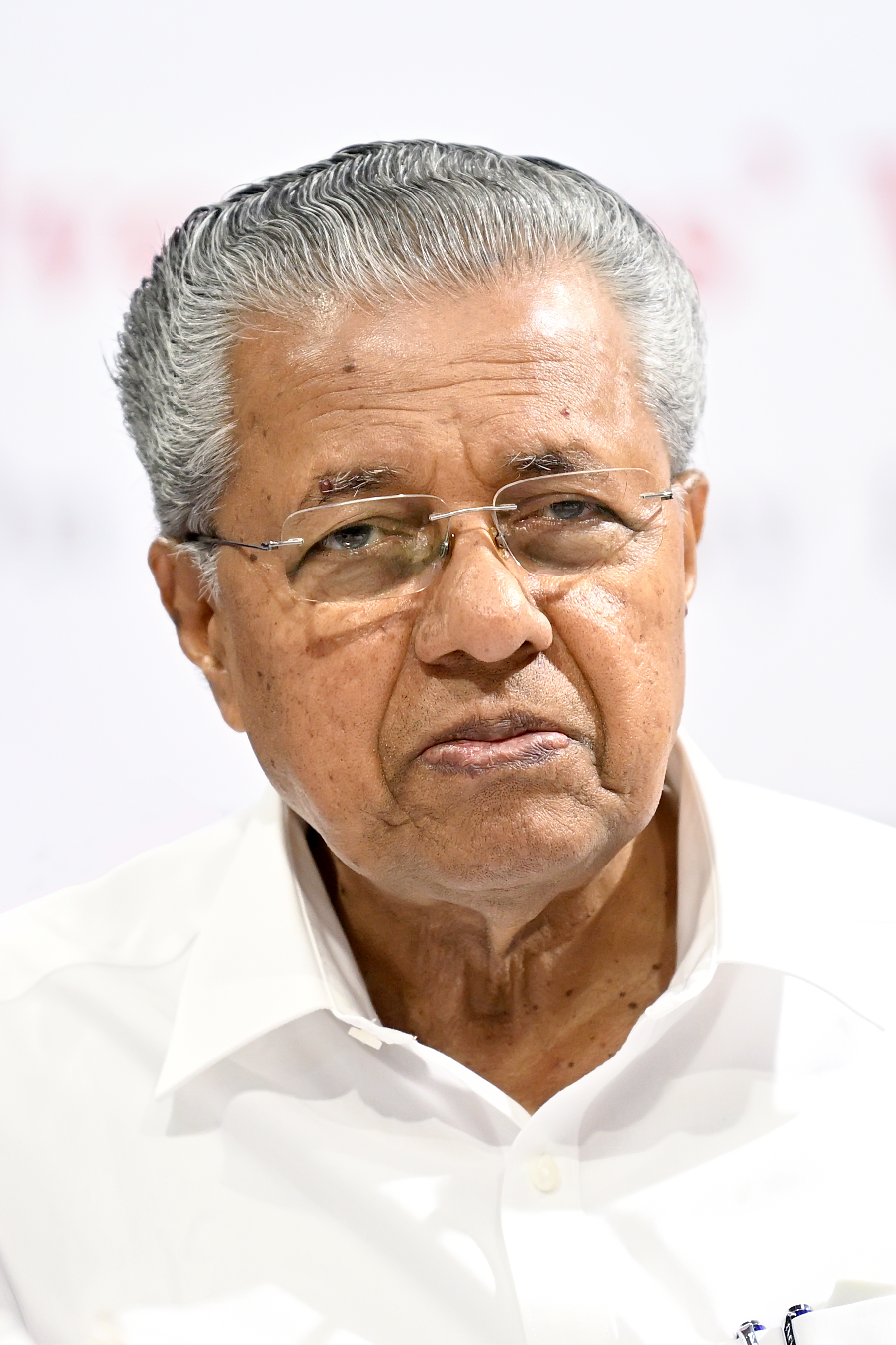

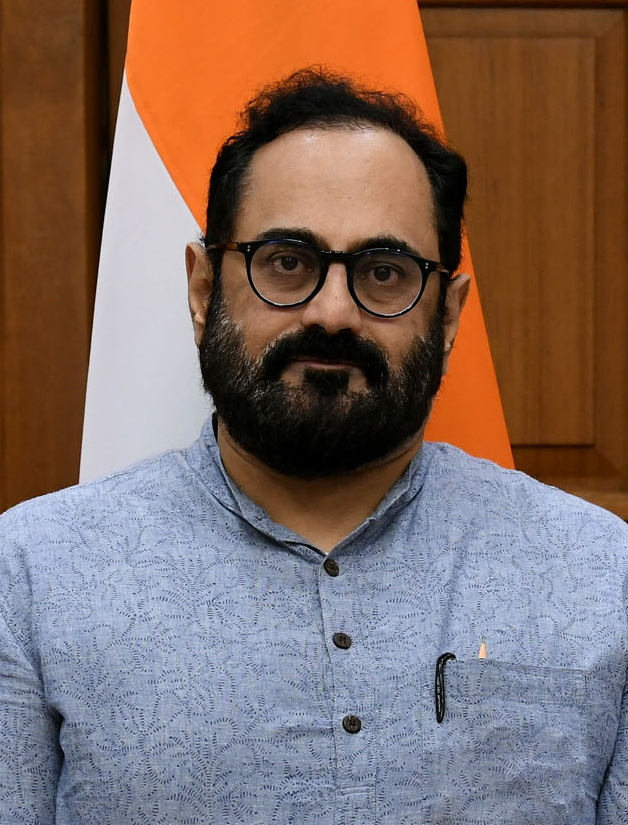
	First party	Second party	Third party
Leader	V. D. Satheesan	Pinarayi Vijayan	Rajeev Chandrasekhar
Party	INC	CPI(M)	BJP
Alliance	UDF	LDF	NDA
Leader since	2021	2016	2025
Leader's seat	Paravur	Dharmadam	Nemom
Last election	25.12%, 22 seats	25.38%, 62 seats	11.3%, 0 seats
Seats won	63	26	3
Seat change	▲41	▼36	▲3
Popular vote	6,217,918	4,700,662	3,450,120
Percentage	28.79%	21.77%	11.42%
Swing	▲3.67 pp	▼3.61 pp	▲0.12 pp
Alliance seats	102	35	3
Alliance seat change	▲61	▼64	▲3
Alliance Popular Vote	10,051,695	8,128,438	3,450,120
Alliance Vote Share	46.55%	37.64	14.13%

Chief Minister before election
Pinarayi Vijayan
CPI(M)
Elected Chief Minister
V. D. Satheesan
INC

2026 Kerala Legislative Assembly Elections were conducted in Kerala on 9 April 2026 to elect 140 members of the Kerala Legislative Assembly. The votes were counted and the results were declared on 4 May 2026, leading to Satheesan ministry.

== Background ==
The tenure of Kerala Legislative Assembly is scheduled to end on 23 May 2026. The previous assembly elections were held in April 2021. After the election, the incumbent Communist Party of India (Marxist)-led Left Democratic Front formed the state government again after winning 99 out of 140 seats in the assembly, with Pinarayi Vijayan sworn in as the Chief Minister.

== Schedule ==
The Election Commission of India announced the schedule for the Kerala Legislative Assembly election on 15 March 2026.

Event	Date
Date of notification	16 March 2026
Last date for filing nominations	23 March 2026
Scrutiny of nominations	24 March 2026
Last date for withdrawal of nomination	26 March 2026
Date of polling	9 April 2026
Date of counting of votes	4 May 2026
Deadline for completion of the election process	6 May 2026

== Voter statistics ==
This is the first election held after the Special Intensive Revision (SIR) of electoral roll. The total number of voters in the state is 27,142,952, comprising 13,220,811 male, 13,921,868 female, and 273 transgender voters.

== Electoral history ==
There are 140 constituencies in Kerala, spread across 14 districts, based on the Delimitation Commission of 2002. These 140 constituencies had a major demarcation with many present in the 2006 elections becoming non-existent and newer ones coming into existence.

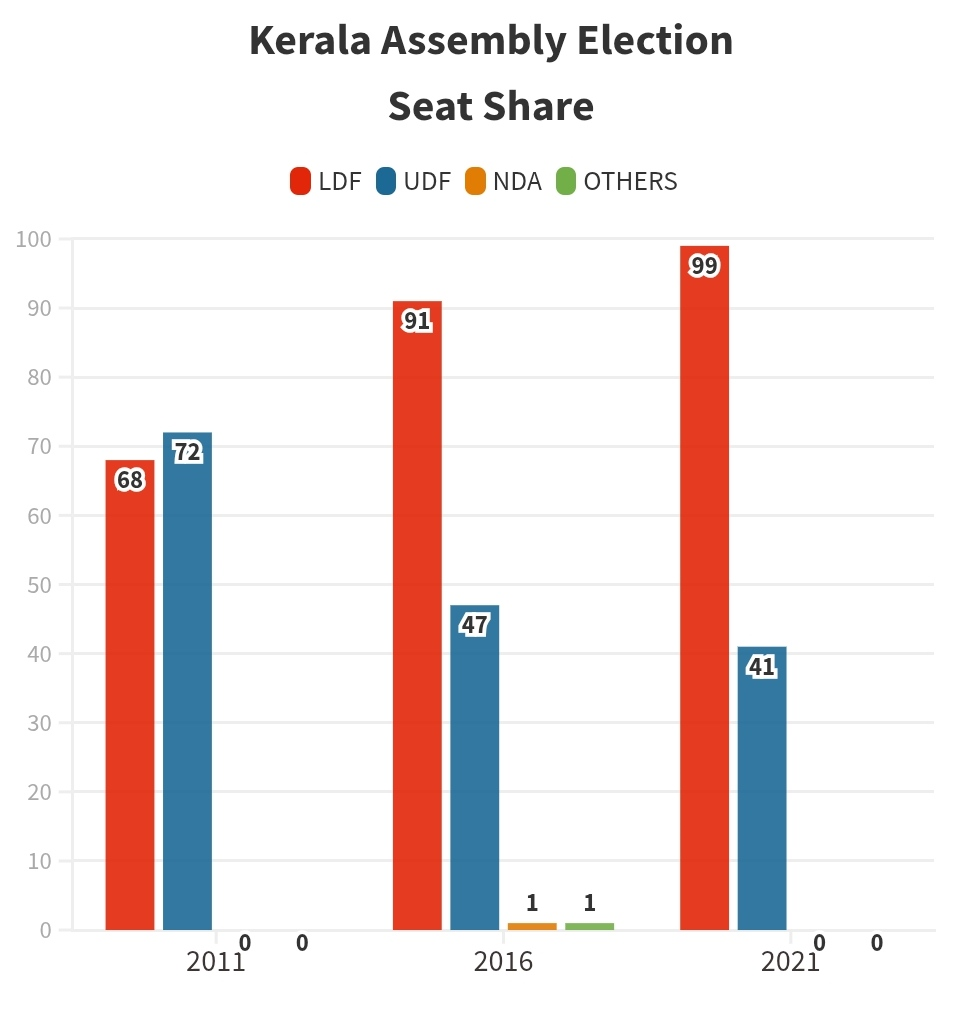
Electoral graph representing the victories of the two major political fronts from 2011, 2016 and 2021 assembly elections respectively.

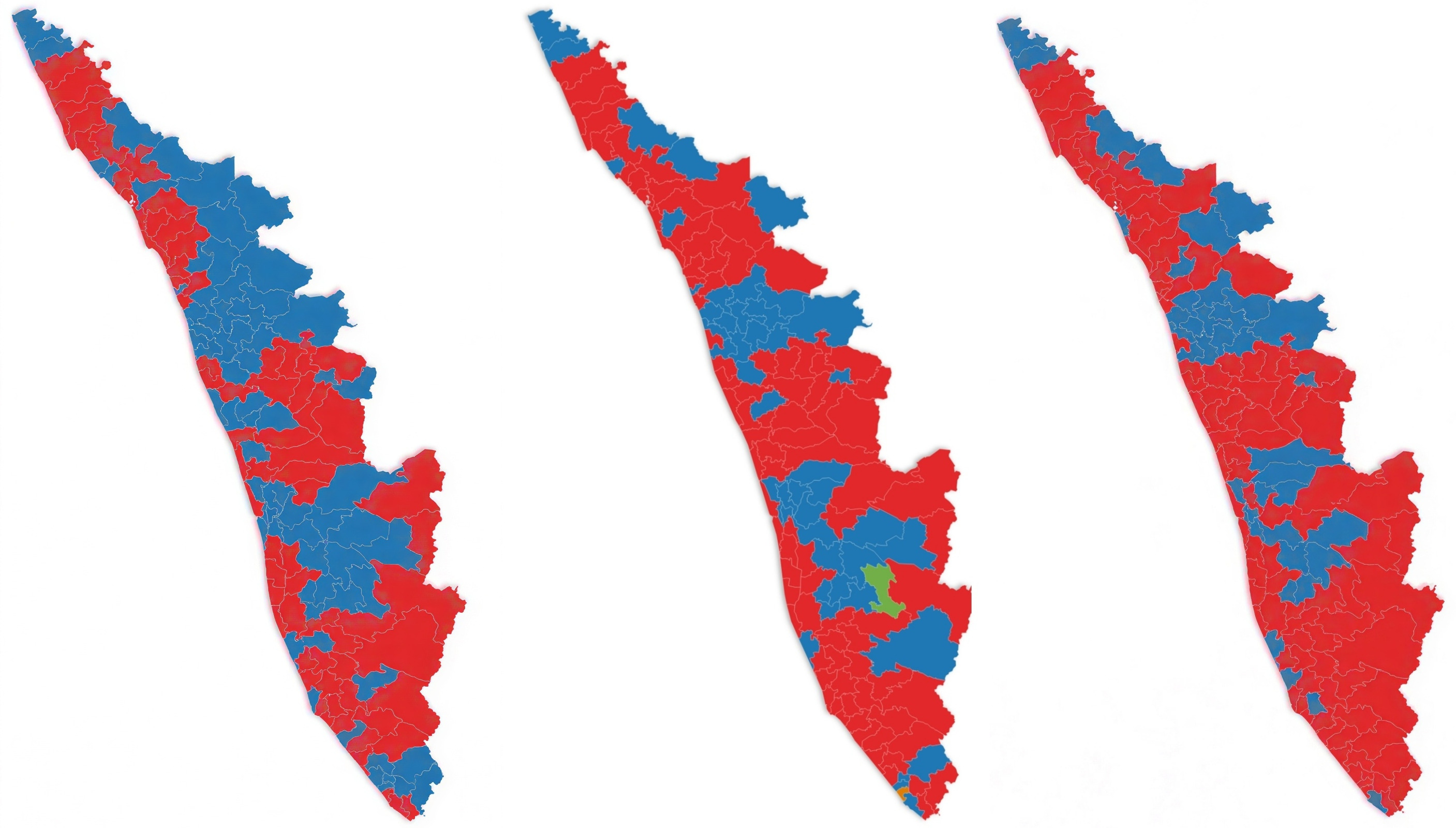
Map representing election results from 140 constituencies during 2011, 2016 and 2021(left to right) assembly elections respectively.

Assembly election result by alliance
Election	Seats won				Ruling coalition	Majority
Election	LDF	UDF	NDA	Others	Ruling coalition	Majority
2011	68	72	0	0	UDF	4
2016	91	47	1	1	LDF	44
2021	99	41	0	0	LDF	58
2026	35	102	3	0	UDF	67

== Parties and alliances ==
=== United Democratic Front ===
The United Democratic Front (UDF) is the Indian National Congress-led alliance of political parties in the Indian state of Kerala.

United Democratic Front
2026 Kerala Legislative Assembly Election UDF Seat Sharing Map
Party	Flag	Symbol	Leader	Seats
Indian National Congress			Sunny Joseph	92
Indian Union Muslim League			Sayyid Sadiq Ali Shihab Thangal	26
Kerala Congress			P. J. Joseph	8
Revolutionary Socialist Party			Shibu Baby John	4
Kerala Congress (Jacob)			Anoop Jacob	1
Revolutionary Marxist Party of India			N. Venu	1
Communist Marxist Party			C. P. John	1
Independents				7
Total				140

=== Left Democratic Front ===
The Left Democratic Front (LDF) is an alliance of left-wing political parties led by Communist Party of India (Marxist) in the Indian state of Kerala.

Left Democratic Front
2026 Kerala Legislative Assembly Election LDF Seat Sharing Map
Party	Flag	Symbol	Leader	Seats
Communist Party of India (Marxist)			M. V. Govindan	77
Communist Party of India			Binoy Viswam	24
Kerala Congress (M)			Jose K. Mani	12
Nationalist Congress Party – Sharadchandra Pawar			Thomas K. Thomas	3
Rashtriya Janata Dal			M. V. Shreyams Kumar	3
Indian Socialist Janata Dal			Mathew T. Thomas	3
Kerala Congress (B)			K. B. Ganesh Kumar	1
Indian National League			Ahamed Devarkovil	1
Congress (Secular)			Kadannappalli Ramachandran	1
Revolutionary Socialist Party (Leninist)			Kovoor Kunjumon	1
Independents				14
Total				140

=== National Democratic Alliance ===
The National Democratic Alliance (NDA) is an Indian multi-party political alliance, led by the country's biggest political party, the Bharatiya Janata Party.

National Democratic Alliance
2026 Kerala Legislative Assembly Election NDA Seat Sharing Map
Party	Flag	Symbol	Leader	Seats
Bharatiya Janata Party			Rajeev Chandrasekhar	98
Bharath Dharma Jana Sena			Thushar Vellapally	22
Twenty20 Party			Sabu M. Jacob	19
Independent				1
Total				140

=== Others ===
Party	Flag	Symbol	Leader	Seats
Bahujan Samaj Party			J Sudhakaran IAS (Retd)	55
Aam Aadmi Party			Vinod Mathew Wilson	53
Social Democratic Party of India			CPA Latheef	34
Socialist Unity Centre of India (Communist)				30
Democratic Human Rights Movement Party				9
Communist Party of India (Marxist-Leninist) Red Star				4
Communist Party of India (Marxist-Leninist) (Liberation)				3
Janam Rashtriya Party				3
Ambedkarite Party of India				2
Equality Party of India				2
All India Hindustan Congress Party				1
Bahujan Dravida Party				1
Bharatheeya Jawan Kisan Party				1
Indian Gandhiyan Party				1
Nationalist Congress Party				1
Rashtravadi Janata Party				1
Republican Party of India (Athawale)				1
Socialist Party (India)				1
Socialist Republican Party (Kerala)				1
The Future India Party				1
Independents				258

=== Party/Alliance Wise Seat Matrix ===
Alliance and Party
Alliance and Party										Total (LDF)
Alliance and Party		UDF								Total (LDF)
Alliance and Party		INC	IUML	KEC	RSP	KC(J)	RMP	CMP	IND	Total (LDF)
LDF										
LDF	CPI(M)	56	11	2	2	—N/a	—N/a	—N/a	6	77
LDF	CPI	19	4	1	—N/a	—N/a	—N/a	—N/a	—N/a	24
LDF	KEC(M)	7	—N/a	3	—N/a	1	—N/a	—N/a	1	12
LDF	NCP-SP	1	1	1	—N/a	—N/a	—N/a	—N/a	—N/a	3
LDF	RJD	1	1	—N/a	—N/a	—N/a	1	—N/a	—N/a	3
LDF	ISJD	1	—N/a	—N/a	—N/a	—N/a	—N/a	—N/a	—N/a	1
LDF	KEC(B)	1	—N/a	—N/a	—N/a	—N/a	—N/a	—N/a	—N/a	1
LDF	INL	—N/a	1	—N/a	—N/a	—N/a	—N/a	—N/a	—N/a	1
LDF	C(S)	1	—N/a	—N/a	—N/a	—N/a	—N/a	—N/a	—N/a	1
LDF	RSP(L)	—N/a	—N/a	—N/a	1	—N/a	—N/a	—N/a	—N/a	1
LDF	IND	5	8	1	1	—N/a	—N/a	1	—N/a	16
Total (UDF)		92	26	8	4	1	1	1	7	140

== Campaign ==
=== Left Democratic Front ===
In February 2026, the Left Democratic Front organized "Vikasana Munnetta Jadha" ("Development Advancement March"), a political march aimed at highlighting the developmental achievements of the incumbent government. On 10 March, the LDF released its campaign slogan for the assembly election, "Mattarund LDF Allathe?" (Who else but LDF?). On 17 March, Chief Minister Pinarayi Vijayan kick-started his election campaign from his home constituency, Dharmadam. On 2 April, the LDF released its election manifesto.

Key Promises

- A 60-point programme containing 950 proposals to create a "Nava Kerala" ("New Kerala").
- Eradicating absolute poverty by uplifting 5 lakh families.
- Increase in social welfare pension from ₹2,000 to ₹3,000.
- Assured job opportunities for youth educated in Kerala through campus placements.
- "Back to Campus" scheme for skill enhancement.
- Ensuring 50% women's work force participation.
- Rapid transit systems in Thiruvananthapuram and Kozhikode.
- Timely completion of the Sabarimala Railway.

=== United Democratic Front ===
On 6 February, Leader of the Opposition V. D. Satheesan launched the ''Puthuyuga Yathra", (March into a New Era), marking the beginning of the United Democratic Front election campaign. The march began at Kumbla in Kasaragod and concluded at Thiruvananthapuram on 7 March. The closing event was inaugurated by Leader of the Opposition in Lok Sabha Rahul Gandhi, who announced five poll-promises. On 15 March, the UDF released its campaign slogan "Keralam Jayikkum, UDF Nayikkum" ("Kerala will win, and UDF will lead"). On 2 April, Chief Minister of Telangana Revanth Reddy released the UDF election manifesto, focusing on "Indira guarantees", named after Indira Gandhi.

Key Promises

- Monthly allowance of ₹1,000 for college-going girls
- Increase in social welfare pension from ₹2,000 to ₹3,000
- Interest-free loans up to ₹5 lakh for young entrepreneurs
- Dedicated department for senior citizens' welfare and protection.
- Free bus travel for women in KSRTC buses.
- "Oommen Chandy Health Insurance" scheme providing ₹25 lakh coverage per household.

=== National Democratic Alliance ===
The Bharatiya Janata Party-led National Democratic Alliance released their campaign slogan "Marathathu Ini Marum", ("What never changed will change now"). On 6 March 2026, the Kerala BJP, led by its state president Rajeev Chandrasekhar, organized a public interaction and mega adalat in Dharmadam constituency, represented by Pinarayi Vijayan. On 11 March 2026, Prime Minister Narendra Modi launched the BJP's official campaign for the Kerala Assembly elections from Kochi. On 31 March, BJP national president Nitin Nabin released the NDA manifesto .

Key Promises

- "Bhakshya-Arogya Suraksha Card" providing monthly ₹2,500 support to women from poor and Below Poverty Line households.
- ₹3,000 monthly social welfare pension for women heads of poor households, widows, and senior citizens
- 20,000 liters of free water supply per household per month
- Two free LPG cylinders annually for poor households during Onam and Christmas
- Establishment of an AIIMS.
- High-speed railway network connecting Thiruvananthapuram and Kannur districts.

== Candidates ==
CPI(M) released the first list of 81 candidates on 15 March 2026. CPI released the first list of 25 candidates on 15 March 2026. ISJD released the first list of 3 candidates on 16 March 2026. KC(M) released the first list of 12 candidates on 16 March 2026. NCP(SP) released the first list of 3 candidates on 16 March 2026. RJD released the first list of 3 candidates on 18 March 2026.

RSP released the first list of 4 candidates on 16 March 2026. INC released the first list of 55 candidates on 17 March 2026; the second list of 37 candidates on 19 March 2026. IUML released the first list of 25 candidates on 17 March 2026. KEC released the first list of 8 candidates on 17 March 2026.

BJP released the first list of 47 candidates on 16 March 2026; the second list of 39 candidates on 19 March 2026. Twenty20 Party released the first list of 4 candidates on 16 March 2026; second and third list of total 8 candidates on 17 March 2026. BDJS released the first list of 12 candidates on 16 March 2026; the second list of 11 candidates on 19 March 2026.

District	Constituency		LDF		UDF		NDA	
District	#	Name	Party	Candidate	Party	Candidate	Party	Candidate
Kasaragod	1	Manjeshwaram	CPI(M)	K. R. Jayanandan	IUML	A. K. M. Ashraf	BJP	K. Surendran
Kasaragod	2	Kasaragod	IND	Shanavas Padhoor	IUML	Kallatra Mahin Haji	BJP	M. L. Ashwini
Kasaragod	3	Udma	CPI(M)	C. H. Kunhambu	INC	K. Neelakandan	BJP	Manulal Meloth
Kasaragod	4	Kanhangad	CPI	Govindan Pallikkappil	KEC	Shyji Ottapalli	BJP	M. Balraj
Kasaragod	5	Thrikaripur	CPI(M)	V. P. P. Mustafa	INC	Sandeep Varier	TTP	Ravi Kulangara
Kannur	6	Payyanur	CPI(M)	T. I. Madhusoodanan	IND	V. Kunjikrishnan	BJP	A. P. Gangadharan
Kannur	7	Kalliasseri	CPI(M)	M. Vijin	INC	Rajeevan Kappachery	BJP	A. V. Anilkumar
Kannur	8	Taliparamba	CPI(M)	P. K. Shyamala	IND	T. K. Govindan	BJP	N. Haridas
Kannur	9	Irikkur	KC(M)	Mathew Kunnapally	INC	Sajeev Joseph	TTP	Srinath Padmanabhan
Kannur	10	Azhikode	CPI(M)	K. V. Sumesh	IUML	Kareem Cheleri	BJP	K. K. Vinod Kumar
Kannur	11	Kannur	C(S)	K. Ramachandran	INC	T. O. Mohanan	BJP	C. Raghunath
Kannur	12	Dharmadom	CPI(M)	Pinarayi Vijayan	INC	Abdul Rasheed	BJP	K. Ranjith
Kannur	13	Thalassery	CPI(M)	Karayi Rajan	INC	K. P. Saju	BJP	O. Nidheesh
Kannur	14	Kuthuparamba	RJD	P. K. Praveen	IUML	Jayanthi Rajan	BJP	Shijilal
Kannur	15	Mattanur	CPI(M)	V. K. Sanoj	INC	Chandran Thillenkeri	BJP	Biju Elakkuzhi
Kannur	16	Peravoor	CPI(M)	K. K. Shailaja	INC	Sunny Joseph	BDJS	Paily Vathiatt
Wayanad	17	Mananthavady (ST)	CPI(M)	O. R. Kelu	INC	Usha Vijayan	BJP	P. Shyam Raj
Wayanad	18	Sulthan Bathery (ST)	CPI(M)	M. S. Viswanathan	INC	I. C. Balakrishnan	BJP	A. S. Kavitha
Wayanad	19	Kalpetta	RJD	P. K. Anil Kumar	INC	T. Siddique	BJP	Prashanth Malavayal
Kozhikode	20	Vatakara	RJD	M. K. Bhaskaran	RMPI	K. K. Rema	BJP	K. Dileep
Kozhikode	21	Kuttiady	CPI(M)	K. P. Kunhammadkutty	IUML	Parakkal Abdulla	BJP	Ramadas Manaleri
Kozhikode	22	Nadapuram	CPI	P. Vasantham	INC	K. M. Abhijith	BJP	C. P. Vipin Chandran
Kozhikode	23	Koyilandy	CPI(M)	K. Dasan	INC	K. Praveen Kumar	BJP	C. R. Praphul Krishnan
Kozhikode	24	Perambra	CPI(M)	T. P. Ramakrishnan	IUML	Fathima Thahiliya	BJP	M. Mohanan Master
Kozhikode	25	Balussery (SC)	CPI(M)	K. M. Sachin Dev	INC	V. T. Sooraj	BJP	C. P. Sateeshan
Kozhikode	26	Elathur	NCP-SP	A. K. Saseendran	INC	Vidya Balakrishnan	BJP	T. Devadas
Kozhikode	27	Kozhikode North	CPI(M)	Thottathil Ravindran	INC	K. Jayanth	BJP	Navya Haridas
Kozhikode	28	Kozhikode South	INL	Ahamed Devarkovil	IUML	Faisal Babu	BJP	T. Reneesh
Kozhikode	29	Beypore	CPI(M)	P. A. Mohammed Riyas	IND	P. V. Anvar	BJP	K. P. Prakash Babu
Kozhikode	30	Kunnamangalam	IND	P. T. A. Rahim	IUML	M. A. Razak Master	BJP	V. K. Sajeevan
Kozhikode	31	Koduvally	IND	Saleem Madavoor	IUML	P. K. Firos	BDJS	Giri Pambanal
Kozhikode	32	Thiruvambady	CPI(M)	Linto Joseph	IUML	C. K. Kasim	TTP	Sunny Thomas
Malappuram	33	Kondotty	CPI(M)	P. Jiji	IUML	T. P. Ashrafali	BJP	P. Subhramanyan
Malappuram	34	Eranad	CPI	Shafeer Kizhisery	IUML	P. K. Basheer	BJP	N. Sreeprakash
Malappuram	35	Nilambur	IND	U. Sharafali	INC	Aryadan Shoukath	BDJS	Gireesh Mekkad
Malappuram	36	Wandoor (SC)	CPI(M)	K. K. Damodaran	INC	A. P. Anil Kumar	IND	E. P. Kumaradas
Malappuram	37	Manjeri	IND	M. Mustafa	IUML	M. Rahmathulla	BJP	Pathmasree M.
Malappuram	38	Perinthalmanna	CPI(M)	V. P. Muhammad Haneefa	IUML	Najeeb Kanthapuram	BJP	K. P. Baburaj
Malappuram	39	Mankada	IND	Kunnath Muhammed	IUML	Manjalamkuzhi Ali	BJP	Lijoy Paul
Malappuram	40	Malappuram	NCP-SP	T. Mujeeb	IUML	P. K. Kunhalikutty	BJP	Aswathy Gupthakumar
Malappuram	41	Vengara	IND	Md. Sabah Kundukuzhikkal	IUML	K. M. Shaji	BJP	Jayakrishnan V. N.
Malappuram	42	Vallikkunnu	IND	C. P. Musthafa	IUML	T. V. Ibrahim	BJP	M. Preman Master
Malappuram	43	Tirurangadi	CPI	Ajit Koladi	IUML	P. M. A. Sameer	BJP	Riju C. Raghav
Malappuram	44	Tanur	IND	P. Mohammed Sameer	IUML	P. K. Navas	BJP	Deepa Puzhakkal
Malappuram	45	Tirur	CPI(M)	V. Abdurahiman	IUML	Kurukkoli Moideen	BJP	K. Narayanan Master
Malappuram	46	Kottakkal	CPI(M)	Preethi Konchath	IUML	K. K. Abid Hussain Thangal	BDJS	Subrahmanian Chunkapally
Malappuram	47	Thavanur	IND	K. T. Jaleel	INC	V. S. Joy	BJP	Ravi Thelath
Malappuram	48	Ponnani	CPI(M)	M. K. Sakeer	INC	K. P. Noushad Ali	BDJS	E. Maneesh
Palakkad	49	Thrithala	CPI(M)	M. B. Rajesh	INC	V. T. Balram	BJP	V. Unnikrishnan Master
Palakkad	50	Pattambi	CPI	Muhammed Muhsin	INC	T. P. Shaji	BJP	P. Manoj
Palakkad	51	Shornur	CPI(M)	P. Mammikutty	INC	P. Harigovindan Master	BJP	Sanku T. Das
Palakkad	52	Ottapalam	CPI(M)	K. Premkumar	IND	P. K. Sasi	BJP	Major Ravi
Palakkad	53	Kongad (SC)	CPI(M)	K. Shanthakumari	INC	K. A. Thulasi	BJP	Renu Suresh
Palakkad	54	Mannarkkad	CPI	Mansil Abubacker	IUML	N. Samsudheen	BDJS	Issac Varghese
Palakkad	55	Malampuzha	CPI(M)	A. Prabhakaran	INC	A. Suresh	BJP	C. Krishnakumar
Palakkad	56	Palakkad	IND	N. M. R. Rasakh	INC	Ramesh Pisharody	BJP	Sobha Surendran
Palakkad	57	Tarur (SC)	CPI(M)	P. P. Sumod	INC	K. C. Subramanian	BJP	Suresh Babu
Palakkad	58	Chittur	ISJD	V. Murugadas	INC	Sumesh Achuthan	BJP	Pranesh Rajendran
Palakkad	59	Nenmara	CPI(M)	K. Preman	INC	A. Thankappan	BDJS	A. N. Anurag
Palakkad	60	Alathur	CPI(M)	T. M. Sasi	INC	K. N. Febin	BJP	K. V. Prasanna Kumar
Thrissur	61	Chelakkara (SC)	CPI(M)	U. R. Pradeep	IND	Sivan Veettikkunnu	BJP	K. Balakrishnan
Thrissur	62	Kunnamkulam	CPI(M)	A. C. Moideen	INC	P. T. Ajay Mohan	BDJS	Rijil K. R.
Thrissur	63	Guruvayur	CPI(M)	N. K. Akbar	IUML	C. H. Rasheed	BJP	B. Gopalakrishnan
Thrissur	64	Manalur	CPI(M)	C. Raveendranath	INC	T. N. Prathapan	BJP	K. K. Aneesh Kumar
Thrissur	65	Wadakkanchery	CPI(M)	Xavier Chittilappilly	INC	Vyshak Narayanaswami	BJP	T. S. Ullas Babu
Thrissur	66	Ollur	CPI	K. Rajan	INC	Shaji Kodankandath	BJP	Bijoy Thomas
Thrissur	67	Thrissur	CPI	Alankode Leelakrishnan	INC	Rajan Pallan	BJP	Padmaja Venugopal
Thrissur	68	Nattika (SC)	CPI	Geetha Gopi	INC	Sunil Lalur	BJP	C. C. Mukundan
Thrissur	69	Kaipamangalam	CPI	K. K. Valsaraj	INC	T. M. Nazar	BDJS	Athulya Ghosh
Thrissur	70	Irinjalakuda	CPI(M)	R. Bindu	KEC	Thomas Unniyadan	BJP	Santhosh Cherkalam
Thrissur	71	Puthukkad	CPI(M)	K. K. Ramachandran	INC	K. M. Babu Raj	BJP	A. Nagesh
Thrissur	72	Chalakudy	KC(M)	Biju Chirayath	INC	T. J. Saneesh Joseph	TTP	Charly Paul
Thrissur	73	Kodungallur	CPI	V. R. Sunil	INC	O. J. Janeesh	TTP	Varghese George
Ernakulam	74	Perumbavoor	KC(M)	Basil Paul	INC	Manoj Moothedan	TTP	Jibi Pathickal
Ernakulam	75	Angamaly	CPI(M)	Saju Paul	INC	Roji M. John	TTP	Promy Kuriakose
Ernakulam	76	Aluva	CPI(M)	A. M. Ariff	INC	Anwar Sadath	BJP	M. A. Brahmaraj
Ernakulam	77	Kalamassery	CPI(M)	P. Rajeeve	IUML	V. E. Abdul Gafoor	BDJS	M. P. Binu
Ernakulam	78	Paravur	CPI	E. T. Taison	INC	V. D. Satheesan	BJP	Vathsala Prasanna Kumar
Ernakulam	79	Vypin	CPI(M)	M. B. Shaini	INC	Tony Chammany	TTP	Anitha Thomas
Ernakulam	80	Kochi	CPI(M)	K. J. Maxi	INC	Mohammad Shiyas	TTP	Xavier Joolappan
Ernakulam	81	Thrippunithura	CPI(M)	K. N. Unnikrishnan	INC	Deepak Joy	TTP	Anjali Nair
Ernakulam	82	Ernakulam	IND	Sabu George	INC	T. J. Vinod	BJP	P. R. Shivashankaran
Ernakulam	83	Thrikkakara	CPI(M)	Pushpa Das	INC	Uma Thomas	TTP	Akhil Marar
Ernakulam	84	Kunnathunad (SC)	CPI(M)	P. V. Srinijin	INC	V. P. Sajeendran	TTP	Babu Divakaran
Ernakulam	85	Piravom	KC(M)	Sabu K. Jacob	KC(J)	Anoop Jacob	TTP	Jibi Abraham
Ernakulam	86	Muvattupuzha	CPI	N. Arun	INC	Mathew Kuzhalnadan	TTP	Sunny Kadoothazhe
Ernakulam	87	Kothamangalam	CPI(M)	Antony John	KEC	Shibu Thekkumpuram	BDJS	Aji Narayanan
Idukki	88	Devikulam (SC)	CPI(M)	A. Raja	INC	F. Raja	BJP	S. Rajendran
Idukki	89	Udumbanchola	CPI(M)	K. K. Jayachandran	INC	Senapathy Venu	BDJS	Sangeetha Viswanathan
Idukki	90	Thodupuzha	KC(M)	Cyriac Chazhikaadan	KEC	Apu John Joseph	TTP	Roy A. Varikkadu
Idukki	91	Idukki	KC(M)	Roshy Augustine	INC	Roy K. Paulose	BDJS	Pratheesh Prabha
Idukki	92	Peerumade	CPI	K. Salim Kumar	INC	Cyriac Thomas	BJP	V. Ratheesh
Kottayam	93	Pala	KC(M)	Jose K. Mani	IND	Mani C. Kappan	BJP	Shone George
Kottayam	94	Kaduthuruthy	KC(M)	Nirmala Jimmy	KEC	Mons Joseph	BDJS	Suresh Ettikunnel
Kottayam	95	Vaikom (SC)	CPI	P. Pradeep	INC	K. Binimon	BJP	K. Ajith
Kottayam	96	Ettumanoor	CPI(M)	V. N. Vasavan	INC	Nattakom Suresh	TTP	Athira D. Nair
Kottayam	97	Kottayam	CPI(M)	K. Anilkumar	INC	T. Radhakrishnan	BDJS	P. Anilkumar
Kottayam	98	Puthuppally	CPI(M)	K. M. Radhakrishnan	INC	Chandy Oommen	BJP	Ravindranath Vakathanam
Kottayam	99	Changanassery	KC(M)	Job Michael	KEC	Vinu Job	BJP	B. Radhakrishna Menon
Kottayam	100	Kanjirappally	KC(M)	N. Jayaraj	INC	Rony K Baby	BJP	George Kurian
Kottayam	101	Poonjar	KC(M)	Sebastian Kulathunkal	INC	Sebastian M. J.	BJP	P. C. George
Alappuzha	102	Aroor	CPI(M)	Daleema	INC	Shanimol Usman	BDJS	P. S. Jyothis
Alappuzha	103	Cherthala	CPI	P. Prasad	INC	K. R. Rajendra Prasad	BDJS	T. P. Anantharaj
Alappuzha	104	Alappuzha	CPI(M)	P. P. Chitharanjan	INC	A.D. Thomas	BJP	M. J. Job
Alappuzha	105	Ambalappuzha	CPI(M)	H. Salam	IND	G. Sudhakaran	BJP	Arun Anirudhan
Alappuzha	106	Kuttanad	NCP-SP	Thomas K. Thomas	KEC	Reji Cheriyan	BDJS	Santhosh Santhy
Alappuzha	107	Haripad	CPI	T. T. Jismon	INC	Ramesh Chennithala	BJP	Sandeep Vachaspati
Alappuzha	108	Kayamkulam	CPI(M)	U. Prathibha	INC	M. Liju	BDJS	Thambi Mettuthara
Alappuzha	109	Mavelikara (SC)	CPI(M)	M. S. Arun Kumar	INC	Muthara Raj	BJP	K. Ajimon
Alappuzha	110	Chengannur	CPI(M)	Saji Cherian	INC	Aby Kuriakose	BJP	M. V. Gopakumar
Pathanamthitta	111	Thiruvalla	IND	Mathew T. Thomas	KEC	Varghese Mammen	BJP	Anoop Antony
Pathanamthitta	112	Ranni	KC(M)	Pramod Narayanan	INC	Pazhakulam Madhu	TTP	Thomas K. Samuel
Pathanamthitta	113	Aranmula	CPI(M)	Veena George	INC	Abin Varkey Kodiyattu	BJP	Kummanam Rajasekharan
Pathanamthitta	114	Konni	CPI(M)	K. U. Jenish Kumar	INC	Satheesh Kochuparambil	BDJS	T. P. Sundareshan
Pathanamthitta	115	Adoor (SC)	CPI	Praji Sashidharan	INC	C. V. Santhakumar	BJP	Pandalam Prathapan
Kollam	116	Karunagappally	CPI	M. S. Thara	INC	C. R. Mahesh	BJP	V. S. Jithin Dev
Kollam	117	Chavara	IND	Sujith Vijayanpillai	RSP	Shibu Baby John	BJP	K. R. Rajesh
Kollam	118	Kunnathur (SC)	RSP(L)	Kovoor Kunjumon	RSP	Ullas Kovur	BJP	Raji Prasad
Kollam	119	Kottarakkara	CPI(M)	K. N. Balagopal	INC	P. Aisha Potty	BJP	R. Reshmi
Kollam	120	Pathanapuram	KC(B)	K. B. Ganesh Kumar	INC	Jyothi Kumar Chamakkala	TTP	Anil Kumar S.
Kollam	121	Punalur	CPI	C. Ajaya Prasad	IUML	Noushad Yunus	TTP	B. Raghunathan Pillai
Kollam	122	Chadayamangalam	CPI	J. Chinchu Rani	INC	M. M. Naseer	BJP	R. S. Arun Raj
Kollam	123	Kundara	CPI(M)	S. L. Sajikumar	INC	P. C. Vishnunadh	BJP	Robin Radhakrishnan
Kollam	124	Kollam	CPI(M)	S. Jayamohan	INC	Bindhu Krishna	BJP	N. Prathap Kumar
Kollam	125	Eravipuram	CPI(M)	M. Noushad	RSP	Vishnu Mohan	BDJS	Saji D. Anand
Kollam	126	Chathannoor	CPI	R. Rajendran	INC	Sooraj Ravi	BJP	B. B. Gopakumar
Thiruvananthapuram	127	Varkala	CPI(M)	V. Joy	INC	Varkala Kahar	BJP	S. Smitha
Thiruvananthapuram	128	Attingal (SC)	CPI(M)	O. S. Ambika	RSP	Santhosh Bhadran	BJP	P. Sudheer
Thiruvananthapuram	129	Chirayinkeezhu (SC)	CPI	Manoj Edamana	INC	Ramya Haridas	BJP	B. S. Anoop
Thiruvananthapuram	130	Nedumangad	CPI	G. R. Anil	INC	Meenankal Kumar	BJP	Yuvaraj Gokul
Thiruvananthapuram	131	Vamanapuram	CPI(M)	D. K. Murali	INC	Sudheersha Palode	BDJS	Venu Karanavar
Thiruvananthapuram	132	Kazhakkoottam	CPI(M)	Kadakampally Surendran	INC	Sarathchandra Prasad	BJP	V. Muraleedharan
Thiruvananthapuram	133	Vattiyoorkavu	CPI(M)	V. K. Prasanth	INC	K. Muraleedharan	BJP	R. Sreelekha
Thiruvananthapuram	134	Thiruvananthapuram	IND	Sudheer Karamana	CMP	C. P. John	BJP	Karamana Jayan
Thiruvananthapuram	135	Nemom	CPI(M)	V. Sivankutty	INC	K. S. Sabarinadhan	BJP	Rajeev Chandrasekhar
Thiruvananthapuram	136	Aruvikkara	CPI(M)	G. Steephen	INC	V. S. Sivakumar	BJP	Vivek Gopan
Thiruvananthapuram	137	Parassala	CPI(M)	C. K. Hareendran	INC	Neyyattinkara Sanal	BJP	Gireesh Neyyar
Thiruvananthapuram	138	Kattakkada	CPI(M)	I. B. Sathish	INC	M. R. Baiju	BJP	P. K. Krishnadas
Thiruvananthapuram	139	Kovalam	IND	Bhagat Rufus	INC	M. Vincent	BJP	T. N. Suresh
Thiruvananthapuram	140	Neyyattinkara	CPI(M)	K. Ansalan	INC	N. Sakthan	BJP	S. Rajasekharan Nair

== Election ==
District wise map of Kerala	Voter turnout	
District wise map of Kerala	District	%
	Kasargod	79.11
	Kannur	78.60
	Wayanad	78.81
	Kozhikode	81.36
	Malappuram	79.82
	Palakkad	80.54
	Thrissur	77.10
	Ernakulam	79.76
	Idukki	77.15
	Kottayam	74.56
	Alappuzha	77.40
	Pathanamthitta	70.76
	Kollam	76.27
	Thiruvananthapuram	77.10
Kerala		79.70

== Surveys and polls ==
=== Opinion polls ===
Seat share projections
Polling agency	Date published	Sample size	Margin of error	LDF	UDF	NDA	Lead	Ref.
Matrize	6 April 2026	N/A	±3%	75–90	67–73	5–8	1–3	
Poll Tracker	6 April 2026	23,800	±3%	55–60	76–85	1–3	6–15	
Network18-Vote Vibe	6 April 2026	N/A	±3%	63–73	64–74	1–5	Hung	
News Malayalam 24x7	5 April 2026	N/A	±3%	78–90	50–62	0–5	8–20	
BIG TV 24x7 Malayalam	5 April 2026	N/A	±3%	64	74	2	4	
Mathrubhumi-CORE	4 April 2026	N/A	±3%	68–78	62–72	0–2	Hung	
Lok Poll	3 April 2026	36,400	±3%	58–62	77–81	1–2	7–11	
Manorama News-CVoter	31 March 2026	89,693	±3%	57–69	69–81	1–5	1–11	
Network18-Vote Vibe	30 March 2026	N/A	±3%	64–70	67–73	1–5	1–3	
Network18-Vote Vibe	23 March 2026	5,146	±3%	71	67	2	1	
IANS-Matrize	15 March 2026	12,015	±3%	61–71	58–69	0–2	1	

Vote share projections
Polling agency	Date published	Sample size	Margin of error	LDF	UDF	NDA	Lead	Ref.
Matrize	6 April 2026	N/A	±3%	39%	42%	15%	3%	
Poll Tracker	6 April 2026	23,800	±3%	37.5–39.8%	42.8–44.2%	13.5–14.8%	3–6.7%	
Network18-Vote Vibe	6 April 2026	N/A	±3%	38.7%	39.7%	16.1%	1%	
News Malayalam 24x7	5 April 2026	N/A	±3%	43.2–45.8%	40–42.2%	11.8–14.2%	1–5.8%	
Lok Poll	3 April 2026	36,400	±3%	39–41%	42–44%	14–16%	1–5%	
Manorama News-CVoter	31 March 2026	89,693	±3%	36%	39%	17%	3%	
Network18-Vote Vibe	30 March 2026	N/A	±3%	37.9%	39.7%	15.3%	1.8%	
Network18-Vote Vibe	23 March 2026	5,146	±3%	36.5%	36.6%	14.9%	0.1%	
IANS-Matrize	15 March 2026	12,015	±3%	42–43%	41–42%	12–13%	0–2%	

=== Exit polls ===
Seat share projections
Polling agency	Date published	Sample size	Margin of error	LDF	UDF	NDA	Lead	Ref.
Today's Chanakya	30 April 2026	N/A	±3%	55–73	60–78	3–11	Hung	
Manorama News-CVoter	29 April 2026	28,848	±3%	44–56	82–94	1–3	26-50	
Axis My India	29 April 2026	24,419	±3%	47–57	83–93	0–3	26-46	
Times Now-JVC	29 April 2026	N/A	±3%	52–61	72–84	3–7	11-32	
Chanakya Strategies	29 April 2026	N/A	±3%	58–64	72–80	1–3	8-22	
P-Marq	29 April 2026	N/A	±3%	62–69	71–79	1–4	2-17	
Matrize	29 April 2026	N/A	±3%	60–65	70–75	3–5	5-15	
People's Pulse	29 April 2026	N/A	±3%	55–65	75–85	0–3	10-30	
People Insight	29 April 2026	N/A	±3%	58–68	66–76	10–14	Hung	
Journo Mirror	29 April 2026	N/A	±3%	55–65	65–80	0–5	0-25	

Vote share projections
Polling agency	Date published	Sample size	Margin of error	LDF	UDF	NDA	Lead	Ref.
Today's Chanakya	30 April 2026	N/A	±3%	38%	40%	20%	2%	
Manorama News-CVoter	29 April 2026	28,848	±3%	38%	43%	14%	5%	
Axis My India	29 April 2026	24,419	±3%	39%	44%	14%	5%	
Matrize	29 April 2026	N/A	±3%	39.5%	41.7%	14%	2.2%	

== Results ==
=== Summary ===
102
UDF
35
LDF
3
NDA

The 2026 Kerala Assembly elections concluded with a historic landslide for the Congress-led United Democratic Front (UDF), which secured 102 seats. This victory marks the alliance's most significant mandate since 1977, effectively ending a decade of Left Democratic Front (LDF) rule; despite this, Kerala remains the stronghold of the federal "INDIA" alliance due to the member parties of both the UDF and the LDF being in the alliance. The Indian National Congress emerged as the dominant force with 63 seats, while the LDF was reduced to just 35. The BJP-led NDA won for the second time in Nemom,and first time in Kazhakootam, and Chathannoor and that too, the three seats which were among the sitting seats of the Left Democratic Front (LDF).

A defining feature of this election was the surge of "rebel" candidates and the total collapse of the incumbent cabinet. Thirteen of the 21 sitting LDF ministers, including high-profile figures like Health Minister Veena George, lost their seats. Traditional CPI(M) strongholds in Kannur were breached by dissident leaders V. Kunhikrishnan and T. K. Govindan Master, while former veteran G. Sudhakaran won Ambalappuzha as a UDF-backed independent by over 27,000 votes. These results signaled a deep-seated shift in voter loyalty across even the most secure Left bastions.

While Chief Minister Pinarayi Vijayan retained his Dharmadam seat, his narrowed margin, caused by INC candidate V. P. Abdul Rasheed leading for the first six rounds, a feat deemed impossible in the Communist fortress and the broader "anti-government cyclone" led to his immediate resignation. In stark contrast, UDF leaders V. D. Satheesan and Ramesh Chennithala secured decisive victories with margins exceeding 20,000 votes, cementing their influence within the alliance. This massive shift in the political landscape has been attributed to strong anti-incumbency and a significant consolidation of minority votes in favor of the UDF.

The LDF's defeat in Kerala marks for the first time in 50 years that no state in India has any Communist party in power on its own. This is especially true in case of the CPI(M), which was founded in 1964 & formed the world's first democratically elected Communist government in Kerala under E. M. S. Namboodiripad in 1967, coinciding with it becoming a powerful alliance partner in the United Front cabinet of West Bengal in the same year. The last time CPI(M) was not in power anywhere in India was the period of 1972–77, when the Congress (now as Congress(R) under Indira Gandhi) returned to power in Kerala in 1970 but made CPI leader C. Achutha Menon the chief minister, while also defeating the United Front in West Bengal in 1971 and strengthen its position in 1972 with CPI support. Although at times the CPI(M) had been restricted to a single state before, such as in West Bengal during 1991-1993 (due to losses in both Kerala and Tripura) & again in Kerala during 2018-2026 (due to historic defeats in West Bengal and Tripura).

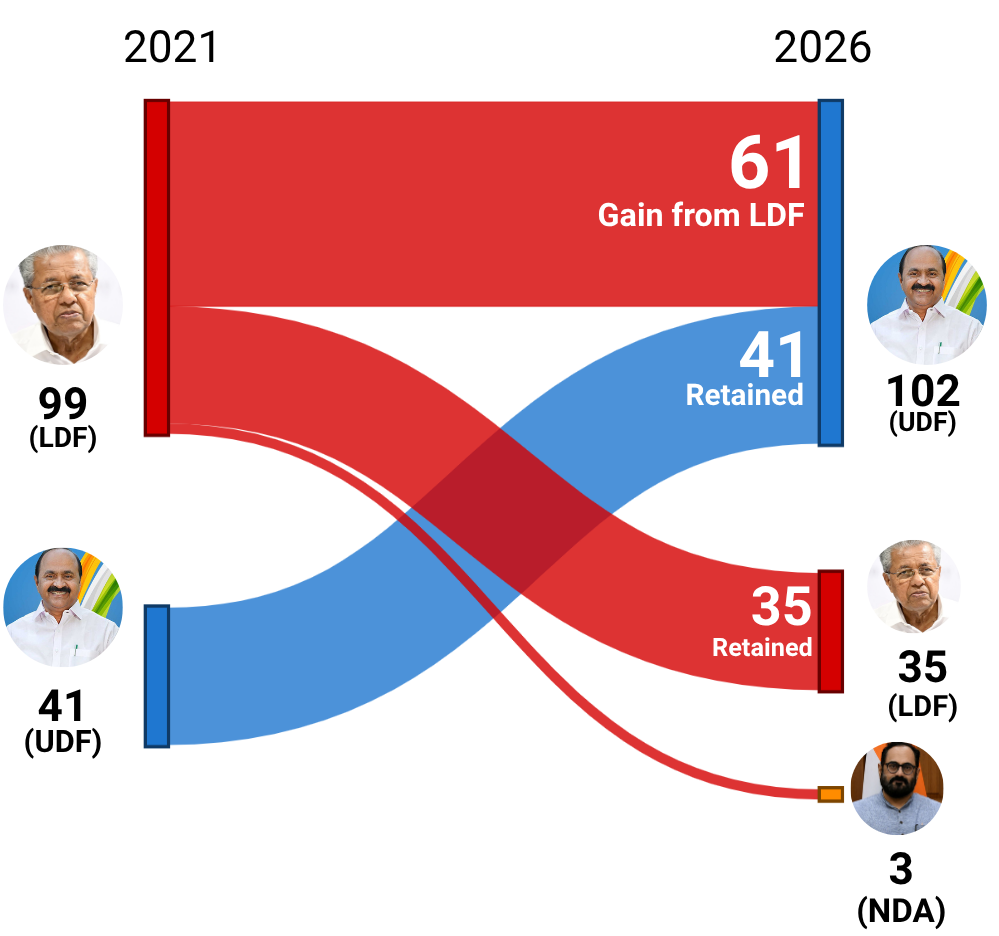
Seats shifted in kerala

=== Results by alliance or party ===
Seat Share (By alliance)
1. UDF (82.8%)
2. LDF (15.0%)
3. NDA (2.14%)
Vote Share (By alliance)
1. UDF (46.5%)
2. LDF (37.6%)
3. NDA (14.2%)
4. NOTA (0.57%)
5. Others (1.05%)

Alliance/ Party		Popular vote			Seats		
Alliance/ Party		Vote	%	±pp	Contested	Won	+/-
UDF	INC	6,217,918	28.79	▲3.59	92	63	▲41
UDF	IUML	2,378,053	11.01	▲2.74	26	22	▲11
UDF	KEC	525,323	2.43	▲0.23	8	7	▲5
UDF	RSP	261,551	1.21	▲0.04	4	3	▲3
UDF	KC(J)	89,551	0.41	▲0.01	1	1	▲▼0
UDF	RMPI	70,117	0.32	▲0.02	1	1	▲▼0
UDF	CMP	45,586	0.21	New	1	1	New
UDF	IND	463,596	2.15	New	7	4	New
UDF	Total	10,051,695	46.55	▲7.07	140	102	▲75
LDF	CPI(M)	4,700,662	21.77	▼3.61	77	26	▼36
LDF	CPI	1,434,524	6.64	▼0.94	24	8	▼9
LDF	KC(M)	561,157	2.60	▼0.68	12	0	▼5
LDF	RJD	178,051	0.82	New	3	1	New
LDF	NCP-SP	147,799	0.68	▼0.31	3	0	▼2
LDF	ISJD	58,815	0.27	New	1	0	New
LDF	INL	41,885	0.19	▼0.47	1	0	▼1
LDF	Cong(S)	52,069	0.24	▼0.05	1	0	▼1
LDF	KC(B)	59,965	0.28	▼0.04	1	0	▼1
LDF	RSP(L)	56,174	0.26	New	1	0	New
LDF	IND	837,337	3.88	New	16	0	New
LDF	Total	8,128,438	37.64	▼7.79	140	35	▼78
NDA	BJP	2,466,178	11.42	▲0.12	98	3	▲3
NDA	BDJS	289,623	1.34	▲0.28	22	0	▲▼0
NDA	TTP	304,566	1.41	▲0.70	19	0	▲▼0
NDA	IND	6,018	0.03	New	1	0	New
NDA	Total	3,066,385	14.20	▲1.79	140	3	▲3
Others		72,841	0.34%		97	0	
IND		56,617	0.26%		258	0	
NOTA		123,067	0.57%				
Total		21,595,055	100	—	883	140	—

UDF	SEATS	LDF	SEATS	NDA	SEATS
INC	63	CPI(M)	26	BJP	3
IUML	26	CPI	8	BDJS	0
KEC	7	RJD	1	TTP	0
RSP	3	KC(M)	0	IND	0
IND	4	NCP-SP	0		
KC(J)	1	INL	0		
RMPI	1	C(S)	0		
CMP	1	KC(B)	0		
		RSP(L)	0		
		ISJD	0		
		IND	0		
Total	102	Total	35	Total	3
Change	+61	Change	-64	Change	+3
Vote Share	46.55%	Vote Share	37.64%	Vote Share	14.20%
Vote Share Change	+7.07	Vote Share Change	-7.79	Vote Share Change	+1.79

=== By region ===
Region Wise Map of Kerala	Region	Seats			
Region Wise Map of Kerala	Region	Seats	UDF	LDF	NDA
	North Kerala	32	24	8	—N/a
	Central Kerala	55	39	16	—N/a
	South Kerala	53	39	11	3
	Total	140	102	35	3

=== Results by district ===
District wise map of Kerala	District	Seats			
District wise map of Kerala	District	Seats	UDF	LDF	NDA
	Kasaragod	5	4	1	—N/a
	Kannur	11	5	6	—N/a
	Wayanad	3	3	—N/a	—N/a
	Kozhikode	13	12	1	—N/a
	Malappuram	16	16	—N/a	—N/a
	Palakkad	12	5	7	—N/a
	Thrissur	13	4	9	—N/a
	Ernakulam	14	14	—N/a	—N/a
	Idukki	5	5	—N/a	—N/a
	Kottayam	9	9	—N/a	—N/a
	Alappuzha	9	6	3	—N/a
	Pathanamthitta	5	4	1	—N/a
	Kollam	11	8	2	1
	Thiruvananthapuram	14	7	5	2
	Total	140	102	35	3

=== Results by constituency ===
District	Constituency		Winner					Runner-up					Margin
District	No.	Name	Candidate	Party	Alliance	Votes	%	Candidate	Party	Alliance	Votes	%	Margin
Kasaragod	1	Manjeshwaram	A. K. M. Ashraf	IUML	UDF	96,948	51.62	K. Surendran	BJP	NDA	67,696	36.04	29,252
Kasaragod	2	Kasaragod	Kallatra Mahin	IUML	UDF	76,396	45.15	Ashwini M. L.	BJP	NDA	53,698	31.74	22,698
Kasaragod	3	Udma	Neelakandan	INC	UDF	78,910	43.64	C H Kunhambu	CPI(M)	LDF	74,063	40.96	4,847
Kasaragod	4	Kanhangad	Govindan Pallikappil	CPI	LDF	79,920	45.47	Shaiji Ottapalli	KEC	UDF	64,604	36.75	15,316
Kasaragod	5	Thrikaripur	Sandeep Varier	INC	UDF	83,109	48.63	V P P Mustafa	CPI(M)	LDF	78,678	46.04	4,431
Kannur	6	Payyanur	V. Kunhikrishnan	IND	UDF	76,640	49.14	T. I. Madhusoodanan	CPI(M)	LDF	69,153	44.34	7,487
Kannur	7	Kalliasseri	M. Vijin	CPI(M)	LDF	81,428	50.93	Rajeevan Kappachery	INC	UDF	62,995	39.40	18,433
Kannur	8	Taliparamba	T K Govindan Master	IND	UDF	91,339	47.53	P K Shyamala	CPI(M)	LDF	78,788	41.00	12,551
Kannur	9	Irikkur	Sajeev Joseph	INC	UDF	90,895	59.94	Mathew Kunnappally	KC(M)	LDF	48,469	31.96	42,426
Kannur	10	Azhikode	K. V. Sumesh	CPI(M)	LDF	64,951	43.76	Kareem Cheleri	IUML	UDF	64,602	43.53	349
Kannur	11	Kannur	T.O Mohanan	INC	UDF	70,620	50.26	K. Ramachandran	C(S)	LDF	52,069	37.05	18,551
Kannur	12	Dharmadom	Pinarayi Vijayan	CPI(M)	LDF	85,614	49.87	Abdul Rasheed	INC	UDF	66,367	38.66	19,247
Kannur	13	Thalassery	Karayi Rajan	CPI(M)	LDF	69,743	48.34	K. P. Saju	INC	UDF	49,220	34.11	20,523
Kannur	14	Kuthuparamba	P. K. Praveen	RJD	LDF	70,448	42.90	Jayanthi Rajan	IUML	UDF	69,162	42.12	1,286
Kannur	15	Mattanur	V. K. Sanoj	CPI(M)	LDF	81,456	47.96	Chandran Thillenkeri	INC	UDF	67,288	39.61	14,168
Kannur	16	Peravoor	Sunny Joseph	INC	UDF	76,140	51.71	K. K. Shailaja	CPI(M)	LDF	61,687	41.89	14,453
Wayanad	17	Mananthavady (ST)	Usha Vijayan	INC	UDF	77,425	46.92	O R Kelu	CPI(M)	LDF	66,882	40.53	10,543
Wayanad	18	Sulthan Bathery (ST)	I. C. Balakrishnan	INC	UDF	78,936	44.61	M S Vishwanathan	CPI(M)	LDF	62,339	35.23	16,597
Wayanad	19	Kalpetta	T. Siddique	INC	UDF	97,379	56.15	P K Anil Kumar	CPI(M)	LDF	52,348	30.18	45,031
Kozhikode	20	Vatakara	K. K. Rema	RMPI	UDF	70,117	48.97	M K Bhaskaran	RJD	LDF	55,255	38.59	14,862
Kozhikode	21	Kuttiady	Parakkal Abdulla	IUML	UDF	88,197	49.52	K. P. Kunhammadkutty	CPI(M)	LDF	77,275	43.39	10,922
Kozhikode	22	Nadapuram	K. M. Abhijith	INC	UDF	99,763	52.87	P.Vasantham	CPI	LDF	76,163	40.36	23,600
Kozhikode	23	Koyilandy	K. Praveen Kumar	INC	UDF	79,913	46.35	K. Dasan	CPI(M)	LDF	67,843	39.35	12,070
Kozhikode	24	Perambra	Fathima Thahiliya	IUML	UDF	81,429	47.32	T. P. Ramakrishnan	CPI(M)	LDF	76,342	44.36	5,087
Kozhikode	25	Balussery (SC)	V. T. Sooraj	INC	UDF	94,804	49.55	K.M. Sachindev	CPI(M)	LDF	77,824	40.68	16,980
Kozhikode	26	Elathur	Vidya Balakrishnan	INC	UDF	77,662	43.69	A. K. Saseendran	NCP(SP)	LDF	65,500	36.85	12,162
Kozhikode	27	Kozhikode North	K.Jayanth	INC	UDF	50,636	35.78	Thottathil Raveendran	CPI(M)	LDF	49,153	34.73	1,483
Kozhikode	28	Kozhikode South	Fyzal Babu	IUML	UDF	52,680	41.20	Ahamed Devarkovil	INL	LDF	41,885	32.76	10,795
Kozhikode	29	Beypore	P. A. Mohammed Riyas	CPI(M)	LDF	81,849	44.21	P. V. Anvar	IND	UDF	74,362	40.16	7,487
Kozhikode	30	Kunnamangalam	M. A. Razak Master	IUML	UDF	91,598	43.84	P. T. A. Rahim	IND	LDF	78,285	37.47	13,313
Kozhikode	31	Koduvally	P. K. Firos	IUML	UDF	95,164	57.33	Saleem Madavoor	IND	LDF	58,482	35.23	36,682
Kozhikode	32	Thiruvambady	C. K. Kasim	IUML	UDF	77,140	51.04	Linto Joseph	CPI(M)	LDF	70,399	46.58	6,741
Malappuram	33	Kondotty	T. P Ashrafali	IUML	UDF	1,14,997	60.01	P. Jiji	CPI(M)	LDF	58,980	30.78	56,017
Malappuram	34	Eranad	P. K. Basheer	IUML	UDF	98,547	58.42	Shafeer Kizhisseri	CPI(M)	LDF	57,258	33.94	41,289
Malappuram	35	Nilambur	Aryadan Shoukath	INC	UDF	1,13,586	62.69	U. Sharafali	IND	LDF	58,735	32.42	54,851
Malappuram	36	Wandoor (SC)	A. P. Anil Kumar	INC	UDF	1,21,074	59.59	K. K. Damodaran	CPI(M)	LDF	73,135	36.00	47,939
Malappuram	37	Manjeri	M. Rahmathulla	IUML	UDF	1,13,622	59.80	M. Mustafa	IND	LDF	55,735	29.33	57,887
Malappuram	38	Perinthalmanna	Najeeb Kanthapuram	IUML	UDF	1,04,888	56.36	V. P. Muhammad Haneefa	CPI(M)	LDF	72,457	38.94	32,431
Malappuram	39	Mankada	Manjalamkuzhi Ali	IUML	UDF	1,10,692	58.98	Kunnath Muhammed	IND	LDF	65,083	34.68	45,609
Malappuram	40	Malappuram	P. K. Kunhalikutty	IUML	UDF	1,31,632	66.86	K. T. Mujeeb Rahman	NCP(SP)	LDF	46,305	23.52	85,327
Malappuram	41	Vengara	K. M. Shaji	IUML	UDF	95,863	56.29	Sabah Kundukuzhikkal	IND	LDF	65,538	38.49	30,325
Malappuram	42	Vallikkunnu	T. V. Ibrahim	IUML	UDF	1,00,718	55.64	C. P. Musthafa	IND	LDF	49,429	27.31	51,289
Malappuram	43	Tirurangadi	P. M. A. Sameer	IUML	UDF	1,11,869	63.48	Ajit Koladi	CPI	LDF	48,482	27.51	63,387
Malappuram	44	Tanur	P. K. Navas	IUML	UDF	91,992	53.38	P. Mohammed Sameer	IND	LDF	64,861	37.64	27,131
Malappuram	45	Tirur	Kurukkoli Moideen	IUML	UDF	1,06,108	53.45	V. Abdurahiman	CPI(M)	LDF	81,971	41.29	24,137
Malappuram	46	Kottakkal	K. K. Abid Hussain Thangal	IUML	UDF	1,18,111	61.77	Preethi Konchath	CPI(M)	LDF	55,473	29.01	62,638
Malappuram	47	Thavanur	V. S Joy	INC	UDF	79,661	48.61	K T Jaleel	IND	LDF	65,014	39.67	14,647
Malappuram	48	Ponnani	K. P Noushad Ali	INC	UDF	80,674	49.81	M. K Sakkeer	CPI(M)	LDF	67,407	41.62	13,267
Palakkad	49	Thrithala	V. T. Balram	INC	UDF	76,427	47.12	M. B. Rajesh	CPI(M)	LDF	68,042	41.95	8,385
Palakkad	50	Pattambi	Muhammed Muhsin	CPI	LDF	80,062	47.25	T.P. Shaji	INC	UDF	70,620	41.68	9,442
Palakkad	51	Shornur	P. Mammikutty	CPI(M)	LDF	70,583	52.81	P. Harigovindan	INC	UDF	54,066	40.45	16,517
Palakkad	52	Ottapalam	K. Premkumar	CPI(M)	LDF	75,362	44.30	P. K. Sasi	IND	UDF	48,585	28.56	26,777
Palakkad	53	Kongad (SC)	K. A. Thulasi	INC	UDF	62,734	42.20	K. Shanthakumari	CPI(M)	LDF	59,028	39.71	3,706
Palakkad	54	Mannarkkad	N. Samsudheen	IUML	UDF	90,606	56.03	Manzil Aboobacker	CPI(M)	LDF	64,703	40.00	25,903
Palakkad	55	Malampuzha	A. Prabhakaran	CPI(M)	LDF	68,629	46.41	C. Krishnakumar	BJP	NDA	48,908	33.07	19,721
Palakkad	56	Palakkad	Ramesh Pisharody	INC	UDF	62,199	42.26	Shobha Surendran	BJP	NDA	49,052	33.33	13,147
Palakkad	57	Tarur (SC)	Sumod	CPI(M)	LDF	60,557	51.52	Subramanian K. C.	INC	UDF	48,647	41.39	11,910
Palakkad	58	Chittur	Sumesh Achuthan	INC	UDF	65,325	44.20	V. Murugadas	ISJD	LDF	58,815	39.80	6,510
Palakkad	59	Nenmara	K. Preman	CPI(M)	LDF	66,521	44.20	A.Thankappan	INC	UDF	63,216	42.00	3,305
Palakkad	60	Alathur	T. M. Sasi	CPI(M)	LDF	61,564	49.82	K. M. Febin	INC	UDF	53,011	42.90	8,553
Thrissur	61	Chelakkara (SC)	U. R. Pradeep	CPI(M)	LDF	76,073	58.12	Sivadasan	Ind	UDF	46,687	35.67	29,386
Thrissur	62	Kunnamkulam	A. C. Moideen	CPI(M)	LDF	69,522	45.22	P. T. Ajay Mohan	INC	UDF	64,959	42.25	4,563
Thrissur	63	Guruvayur	N. K. Akbar	CPI(M)	LDF	66,069	40.77	C. H. Rasheed	IUML	UDF	64,071	39.54	1,998
Thrissur	64	Manalur	C. Raveendranath	CPI(M)	LDF	65,337	38.12	T. N. Prathapan	INC	UDF	65,211	38.05	126
Thrissur	65	Wadakkanchery	Xavier Chittilappilly	CPI(M)	LDF	70,725	43.22	Vyshak Narayanaswami	INC	UDF	65,035	39.74	5,690
Thrissur	66	Ollur	K. Rajan	CPI	LDF	69,703	45.86	Shaji Kodankandath	INC	UDF	60,819	40.02	8,884
Thrissur	67	Thrissur	Rajan Pallan	INC	UDF	60,290	48.55	Alankode Leelakrishnan	CPI	LDF	33,487	26.96	26,803
Thrissur	68	Nattika (SC)	Geetha Gopi	CPI	LDF	58,979	37.44	Sunil Lalur	INC	UDF	51,886	32.94	7,093
Thrissur	69	Kaipamangalam	K. K. Valsaraj	CPI	LDF	65,448	48.92	T. M. Nazar	INC	UDF	55,504	41.48	9,944
Thrissur	70	Irinjalakuda	Thomas Unniyadan	KEC	UDF	66,282	49.32	R. Bindu	CPI(M)	LDF	56,070	41.72	10,212
Thrissur	71	Puthukkad	K. K. Ramachandran	CPI(M)	LDF	63,136	40.95	K. M. Babu Raj	INC	UDF	60,283	39.10	2,853
Thrissur	72	Chalakudy	T. J. Saneesh Kumar Joseph	INC	UDF	71,202	51.62	Biju S Chirayath	KC(M)	LDF	48,046	34.83	23,156
Thrissur	73	Kodungallur	O. J. Janeesh	INC	UDF	65,162	48.24	V. R. Sunil Kumar	CPI	LDF	56,854	42.09	8,308
Ernakulam	74	Perumbavoor	Manoj Moothedan	INC	UDF	75,088	50.90	Basil Paul	KC(M)	LDF	46,656	31.62	28,434
Ernakulam	75	Angamaly	Roji M. John	INC	UDF	78,331	59.86	Saju Paul	CPI(M)	LDF	41,323	31.58	37,008
Ernakulam	76	Aluva	Anwar Sadath	INC	UDF	83,899	52.78	A. M. Ariff	CPI(M)	LDF	54,756	34.45	29,143
Ernakulam	77	Kalamassery	V. E. Abdul Gafoor	IUML	UDF	80,606	49.35	P. Rajeeve	CPI(M)	LDF	64,294	39.36	16,312
Ernakulam	78	Paravur	V. D. Satheesan	INC	UDF	78,658	49.30	E. T. Taison	CPI	LDF	58,058	36.39	20,600
Ernakulam	79	Vypin	Tony Chammany	INC	UDF	66,112	50.18	M. B. Shaini	CPI(M)	LDF	50,464	38.30	15,648
Ernakulam	80	Kochi	Mohammad Shiyas	INC	UDF	64,318	47.87	K. J. Maxi	CPI(M)	LDF	56,130	41.78	8,188
Ernakulam	81	Thrippunithura	Deepak Joy	INC	UDF	70,256	45.47	K. N. Unnikrishnan	CPI(M)	LDF	51,788	33.51	18,468
Ernakulam	82	Ernakulam	T. J. Vinod	INC	UDF	61,296	56.90	Sabu George	IND	LDF	25,133	23.33	36,163
Ernakulam	83	Thrikkakara	Uma Thomas	INC	UDF	83,375	59.35	Pushpa Das	CPI(M)	LDF	33,164	23.61	50,211
Ernakulam	84	Kunnathunad (SC)	V. P. Sajeendran	INC	UDF	70,292	43.64	P. V. Sreenijin	CPI(M)	LDF	49,009	30.43	21,283
Ernakulam	85	Piravom	Anoop Jacob	KEC(J)	UDF	89,551	58.77	Sabu K. Jacob	KC(M)	LDF	44,870	29.44	44,681
Ernakulam	86	Muvattupuzha	Mathew Kuzhalnadan	INC	UDF	89,914	60.70	N. Arun	CPI	LDF	47,085	31.79	42,829
Ernakulam	87	Kothamangalam	Shibu Thekkumpuram	KEC	UDF	73,479	52.83	Antony John	CPI(M)	LDF	56,620	40.71	16,859
Idukki	88	Devikulam (SC)	F. Raja	INC	UDF	50,590	45.12	A. Raja	CPI(M)	LDF	45,357	40.45	5,233
Idukki	89	Udumbanchola	Senapathy Venu	INC	UDF	64,916	55.48	K. K. Jayachandran	CPI(M)	LDF	44,895	38.37	20,021
Idukki	90	Thodupuzha	Apu John Joseph	KEC	UDF	84,796	58.01	Cyriac Chazhikkadan	KC(M)	LDF	40,505	27.71	44,291
Idukki	91	Idukki	Roy K Paulose	INC	UDF	70,562	54.93	Roshy Augustine	KC(M)	LDF	46,740	36.39	23,822
Idukki	92	Peerumade	Cyriac Thomas	INC	UDF	69,672	58.74	K. Salimkumar	CPI	LDF	42,038	35.44	27,634
Kottayam	93	Pala	Mani C. Kappan	IND	UDF	50,799	37.39	Jose K. Mani	KC(M)	LDF	47,808	35.19	2,991
Kottayam	94	Kaduthuruthy	Mons Joseph	KEC	UDF	70,353	56.39	Nirmala Jimmy	KC(M)	LDF	39,053	31.30	31,300
Kottayam	95	Vaikom (SC)	K. Binimon	INC	UDF	52,944	41.94	P Pradeep	CPI	LDF	51,584	40.86	1,360
Kottayam	96	Ettumanoor	Nattakom Suresh	INC	UDF	64,077	52.13	V..Vasavan	CPI	LDF	44,325	36.06	19,752
Kottayam	97	Kottayam	Thiruvanchoor Radhakrishnan	INC	UDF	68,893	60.57	K.Anilkumar	CPI	LDF	32,907	28.93	35,986
Kottayam	98	Puthuppally	Chandy Oommen	INC	UDF	84,031	66.32	K. M. Radhakrishnan	CPI(M)	LDF	31,124	24.56	52,907
Kottayam	99	Changanassery	Vinu Job Kuzhimannil	KEC	UDF	55,991	49.54	Job Maichil	KC(M)	LDF	47,623	42.13	8,368
Kottayam	100	Kanjirappally	Rony K Baby	INC	UDF	56,646	41.66	N. Jayaraj	KC(M)	LDF	50,874	37.41	5,772
Kottayam	101	Poonjar	Sebastian M. J.	INC	UDF	56,900	39.30	Sebastian Kulathunkal	KC(M)	LDF	50,207	34.67	6,693
Alappuzha	102	Aroor	Shanimol Osman	INC	UDF	74,469	45.98	Daleema	CPI(M)	LDF	65,145	40.22	9,324
Alappuzha	103	Cherthala	P. Prasad	CPI	LDF	83,216	48.32	K. R. Rajendra Prasad	INC	UDF	68,727	39.91	14,489
Alappuzha	104	Alappuzha	A.D.Thomas	INC	UDF	81,065	51.42	P. P. Chitharanjan	CPI(M)	LDF	60,050	38.09	21,015
Alappuzha	105	Ambalappuzha	G. Sudhakaran	IND	UDF	75,184	53.40	H. Salam	CPI(M)	LDF	47,249	33.56	27,935
Alappuzha	106	Kuttanad	Reji Cheriyan	KEC	UDF	56,594	50.28	Thomas K. Thomas	NCP(SP)	LDF	35,994	31.98	20,600
Alappuzha	107	Haripad	Ramesh Chennithala	INC	UDF	68,184	47.02	T. T. Jismon	CPI	LDF	44,807	30.90	23,377
Alappuzha	108	Kayamkulam	M. Liju	INC	UDF	76,651	49.33	U. Prathibha	CPI(M)	LDF	61,079	39.30	15,572
Alappuzha	109	Mavelikara (SC)	M. S. Arun Kumar	CPI(M)	LDF	67,180	47.09	Muthara Raj	INC	UDF	51,444	36.06	15,736
Alappuzha	110	Chengannur	Saji Cherian	CPI(M)	LDF	57,859	42.10	Aby Kuriakose	INC	UDF	47,567	34.61	10,292
Pathanamthitta	111	Thiruvalla	Varghese Mammen	KEC	UDF	53,224	37.82	Anoop Antony	BJP	NDA	43,078	30.61	10,146
Pathanamthitta	112	Ranni	Pazhakulam Madhu	INC	UDF	54,652	44.13	Pramod Narayan	KC(M)	LDF	50,308	40.62	4,344
Pathanamthitta	113	Aranmula	Abin Varkey	INC	UDF	70,083	44.51	Veena George	CPI(M)	LDF	51,098	32.45	18,985
Pathanamthitta	114	Konni	K. U. Jenish Kumar	CPI(M)	LDF	60,380	44.59	Satheesh Kochuparambil	INC	UDF	58,542	43.23	1,838
Pathanamthitta	115	Adoor (SC)	C. V. Santhakumar	INC	UDF	66,153	44.20	Priji Kannan	CPI	LDF	55,821	37.30	10,332
Kollam	116	Karunagapally	C. R. Mahesh	INC	UDF	82,593	47.81	M. S. Thara	CPI	LDF	55,975	32.40	26,618
Kollam	117	Chavara	Shibu Baby John	RSP	UDF	74,308	52.20	Sujith Vijayanpillai	IND	LDF	55,735	39.16	18,573
Kollam	118	Kunnathur (SC)	Ullas Kovur	RSP	UDF	81,488	49.66	Kovoor Kunjumon	RSP(L)	LDF	56,174	34.23	25,314
Kollam	119	Kottarakkara	K. N. Balagopal	CPI(M)	LDF	63,926	42.95	P. Aisha Potty	INC	UDF	62,914	42.27	1,012
Kollam	120	Pathanapuram	Jyothi Kumar Chamakkala	INC	UDF	68,275	49.61	K. B. Ganesh Kumar	KC(B)	LDF	59,965	43.57	8,310
Kollam	121	Punalur	C. Ajayaprasad	CPI	LDF	71,944	54.89	Noushad Younus	IUML	UDF	50,415	38.47	21,529
Kollam	122	Chadayamangalam	M. M. Naseer	INC	UDF	68,281	44.55	J. Chinchu Rani	CPI	LDF	60,795	39.67	7,486
Kollam	123	Kundara	P. C. Vishnunadh	INC	UDF	87,862	53.44	S. L. Sajikumar	CPI(M)	LDF	55,298	33.63	32,564
Kollam	124	Kollam	Bindu Krishna	INC	UDF	63,416	52.85	S. Jayamohan	CPI(M)	LDF	46,586	38.82	16,830
Kollam	125	Eravipuram	Vishnu Mohan	RSP	UDF	64,383	48.63	M. Noushad	CPI(M)	LDF	55,580	41.98	8,803
Kollam	126	Chathannoor	B. B. Gopakumar	BJP	NDA	51,923	38.04	R. Rajendran	CPI	LDF	47,525	34.82	4,398
Thiruvananthapuram	127	Varkala	V. Joy	CPI(M)	LDF	55,365	40.05	Varkala Kahar	INC	UDF	53,315	38.57	2,050
Thiruvananthapuram	128	Attingal (SC)	O. S. Ambika	CPI(M)	LDF	59,163	39.46	P. Sudheer	BJP	NDA	45,788	30.54	13,375
Thiruvananthapuram	129	Chirayinkeezhu (SC)	Ramya Haridas	INC	UDF	56,833	38.51	Manoj Edamana	CPI	LDF	55,411	37.55	1,422
Thiruvananthapuram	130	Nedumangad	G. R. Anil	CPI	LDF	69,206	43.55	Meenankal Kumar	INC	UDF	47,623	29.97	21,583
Thiruvananthapuram	131	Vamanapuram	Sudheersha Palode	INC	UDF	73,590	49.36	D. K. Murali	CPI(M)	LDF	61,405	41.19	12,185
Thiruvananthapuram	132	Kazhakkoottam	V. Muraleedharan	BJP	NDA	46,564	35.39	Kadakampally Surendran	CPIM	LDF	46,136	35.06	428
Thiruvananthapuram	133	Vattiyoorkavu	K. Muraleedharan	INC	UDF	48,338	37.25	V. K. Prasanth	CPI(M)	LDF	42,913	33.07	5,425
Thiruvananthapuram	134	Thiruvananthapuram	C. P. John	CMP	UDF	45,586	37.83	Sudheer Karamana	IND	LDF	35,723	29.65	9,863
Thiruvananthapuram	135	Nemom	Rajeev Chandrasekhar	BJP	NDA	57,192	40.75	V. Sivankutty	CPIM	LDF	52,214	37.20	4,978
Thiruvananthapuram	136	Aruvikkara	G. Steephen	CPI(M)	LDF	61,907	42.15	V. S. Sivakumar	INC	UDF	59,064	40.21	2,843
Thiruvananthapuram	137	Parassala	C. K. Hareendran	CPI(M)	LDF	69,149	44.61	Neyyattinkara Sanal	INC	UDF	54,136	34.92	15,013
Thiruvananthapuram	138	Kattakkada	M. R. Baiju	INC	UDF	56,846	38.87	I. B. Sathish	CPI(M)	LDF	49,710	33.99	7,136
Thiruvananthapuram	139	Kovalam	M. Vincent	INC	UDF	79,661	51.32	Bhagat Rufus	IND	LDF	46,952	30.25	32,709
Thiruvananthapuram	140	Neyyattinkara	N. Sakthan	INC	UDF	58,760	43.98	K. Ansalan	CPI(M)	LDF	51,794	38.76	6,966

== Aftermath ==
Following their election victory, there was a political leadership dispute within the Indian National Congress and the United Democratic Front (UDF). The crisis emerged after the Congress leadership delayed the announcement of the next Chief Minister of Kerala despite the UDF securing a decisive majority in the Kerala Legislative Assembly. The prolonged uncertainty led to internal factional tensions, administration crisis, public criticism, and extensive media coverage.

The leadership contest primarily involved senior Congress leaders V. D. Satheesan, K. C. Venugopal, and Ramesh Chennithala. The Congress high command, led by Rahul Gandhi and Mallikarjun Kharge, held multiple rounds of consultations in New Delhi before finalizing a decision.

=== Crisis ===
Despite the UDF's electoral victory, the Congress leadership did not immediately announce a chief ministerial candidate due to competing claims within the Congress party over the chief ministerial position, resulting in a leadership deadlock. Amid the continuing leadership deadlock, the Indian National Congress appointed Mukul Wasnik and Ajay Maken as party observers to conduct consultations with newly elected United Democratic Front (UDF) legislators in Kerala. The observers met elected Congress party Members of the Legislative Assembly (MLAs) individually to assess support for the chief ministerial candidates before submitting a report to the Congress high command in New Delhi. According to media reports, a majority of Congress MLAs were said to have expressed support for K. C. Venugopal.

The news about the majority of MLAs' support for K. C. Venugopal led to growing tensions among party workers and supporters of rival factions. Reports of lobbying, demonstrations, and pressure campaigns emerged from several districts in Kerala contributing to the crisis’ escalation.

The Congress high command held meetings with former Kerala Pradesh Congress Committee presidents, and on 14 May 2026 announced V. D. Satheesan as Chief Minister of Kerala.

=== Public reaction ===
The leadership deadlock led to extensive poster campaigns and online activity by supporters of competing Congress leaders across Kerala. Posters supporting V. D. Satheesan, K. C. Venugopal, and Ramesh Chennithala appeared in several districts, including Thiruvananthapuram, Alappuzha, Ernakulam, Kozhikode, Kannur and Wayanad. Social media platforms including Facebook, X, Instagram, and WhatsApp became major arenas for political campaigning by rival supporter groups. Hashtags promoting individual leaders trended among Kerala political users, while memes, edited videos, online opinion polls, and factional campaign graphics circulated widely. Some incidents of self-immolation threats by party workers were also reported.

In Wayanad, posters criticizing Rahul Gandhi and Priyanka Gandhi were reported after delays in announcing the chief ministerial candidate. Some posters reportedly stated that “Kerala won’t forgive” the Congress leadership for the delay and compared the situation to the party's electoral setbacks in other states. Several Congress leaders publicly appealed to party workers to avoid factional campaigning and maintain discipline until the Congress high command announced a final decision regarding the chief ministership.

Several UDF allies also publicly expressed concern over the delay. An editorial published in Suprabhaatham, a newspaper associated with sections of the Indian Union Muslim League (IUML), criticized the Congress for what it described as indecisiveness after the election victory. Kerala Pradesh Congress Committee president Sunny Joseph acknowledged that the delay in selecting a leader had begun to overshadow the alliance's electoral victory.

=== Role of Congress high command ===
The Congress high command played a central role in resolving the leadership dispute following the United Democratic Front's victory in the 2026 Kerala Legislative Assembly election. Senior national leaders, including Rahul Gandhi and Congress president Mallikarjun Kharge, held multiple rounds of consultations with senior Kerala Congress leaders and former Kerala Pradesh Congress Committee presidents regarding the leadership issue.

The high command reportedly sought to prevent factional divisions within the Kerala unit while ensuring consensus among competing groups backing V. D. Satheesan, K. C. Venugopal, and Ramesh Chennithala. Media reports stated that the central leadership was dissatisfied with public lobbying, poster campaigns, and social media activity by supporters of rival leaders during the selection process. The delay in announcing the Chief Minister led to criticism from opposition parties and some UDF allies, increasing pressure on the Congress leadership to reach a final decision quickly.

== See also ==
- Satheesan ministry
- 2025 Kerala local elections
- 2024 Indian general election in Kerala
- Elections in Kerala
- Politics of Kerala
