= M. R. Baiju =

Indian politician (born 1975)

M. R. Baiju (born 1975) is an Indian politician from Kerala. He is a member of the Kerala Legislative Assembly from the Kattakada Assembly constituency in Thiruvananthapuram district representing the Indian National Congress.

== Early life ==
Baiju is from Kattakada, Thiruvananthapuram district, Kerala. He is a graduate.

== Career ==
Baiju won the Kattakada Assembly constituency representing the Indian National Congress in the 2026 Kerala Legislative Assembly election. He polled 56,846 votes and defeated his nearest rival and sitting MLA, I. B. Sathish of the Communist Party of India (Marxist), by a margin of 7,136 votes.
