= Nemom Assembly constituency =

Constituency of the Kerala legislative assembly in India

Nemom
- Constituency No. 135 for the Kerala Legislative Assembly
- Nemom In Trivandrum District

Constituency details
- Country: India
- Region: South India
- State: Kerala
- District: Thiruvananthapuram
- Lok Sabha constituency: Thiruvananthapuram
- Established: 1957
- Total electors: 1,71,178 (2026)
- Reservation: None

Member of Legislative Assembly
- 16th Kerala Legislative Assembly
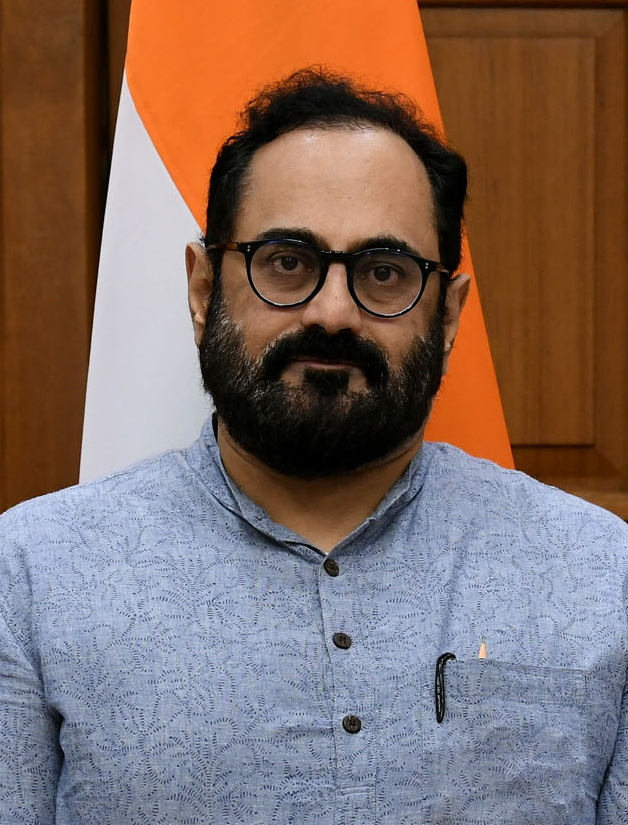
- Incumbent Rajeev Chandrasekhar
- Party: BJP
- Alliance: NDA
- Elected year: 2026

Nemom Assembly constituency is one of the 140 state legislative assembly constituencies in Kerala, India. It is one of the seven assembly segments that constitute the Thiruvananthapuram Lok Sabha constituency. Since 2026, the constituency has been represented by Rajeev Chandrasekhar of the Bharatiya Janata Party

This constituency serves as a vital stronghold for the RSS, dominated by Nair population.

== Local self-governed segments ==
Nemom is composed of 22 wards of the Thiruvananthapuram Municipal Corporation.

The wards are:

1. Thirumala
2. Thirikkannapuram
3. Punnakkamugal
4. Poojappura
5. Mudavanmugal
6. Estate
7. Nemom
8. Ponnumangalam
9. Melamcode
10. Pappanamcode
11. Karamana
12. Nedumcaud
13. Kaladi
14. Karumom
15. Punchakkari
16. Poonkulam
17. Vellar
18. Thiruvallam
19. Ambalathara
20. Attukal
21. Kalippankulam
22. Kamaleswaram

After the 2008 delimitation, major parts of previous Trivandrum East Assembly were added to Nemom.

== Members of Legislative Assembly ==
The following list contains all members of Kerala Legislative Assembly who have represented Nemom Assembly constituency during the period of various assemblies:

Year	Name	Political party
1957	M. Sadasivan	Communist Party of India
1960	P. Viswambharan	Praja Socialist Party
1965	M. Sadasivan	Communist Party of India (Marxist)
1967	M. Sadasivan	Communist Party of India (Marxist)
1970	G. Kuttapan	Praja Socialist Party
1977	S. Varadarajan Nair	Indian National Congress
1980	E. Ramesan Nair	Indian National Congress
1982	K. Karunakaran	Indian National Congress
1987	V. J. Thankappan	Communist Party of India (Marxist)
1991	V. J. Thankappan	Communist Party of India (Marxist)
1996	Venganoor P. Bhaskaran	Communist Party of India (Marxist)
2001	N. Sakthan	Indian National Congress
2006	N. Sakthan	Indian National Congress
Delimitation and Major boundary changes
2011	V. Sivankutty	Communist Party of India (Marxist)
2016	O. Rajagopal	Bharatiya Janata Party
2021	V. Sivankutty	Communist Party of India (Marxist)
2026	Rajeev Chandrasekhar	Bharatiya Janata Party

== Election results ==
Percentage change (±%) denotes the change in the number of votes from the immediate previous election.

=== 2026 ===
There were 1,71,178 registered voters in Nemom Assembly constituency for the 2026 Kerala Assembly election as per SIR 2026.

2026 Kerala Legislative Assembly election: Nemom
Party	Candidate	Votes	%	±%
BJP	Rajeev Chandrasekhar	57,192	40.75	▲5.21
CPI(M)	V. Sivankutty	52,214	37.20	▼1.04
INC	K. S. Sabarinadhan	29,730	21.18	▼3.83
NOTA	None of the above	604	0.43	▼0.09
Margin of victory		4,978	3.55	▲0.84
Turnout		1,40,355	80.62	▲9.13
BJP gain from CPI(M)		Swing	3.13	

=== 2021 ===
There were 2,04,718 registered voters in Nemom Assembly constituency for the 2021 Kerala Assembly election.

2021 Kerala Legislative Assembly election: Nemom
Party	Candidate	Votes	%	±%
CPI(M)	V. Sivankutty	55,837	38.24	▼3.15
BJP	Kummanam Rajasekharan	51,888	35.54	▼11.92
INC	K. Muraleedharan	36,524	25.01	▲15.31
NOTA	None of the above	756	0.52	▼0.09
BSP	D. Vijayan	356	0.24	–
Independent	Jain Wilson	165	0.11	–
Majority		3,949	2.71	▼3.36
Turnout		1,46,354	71.49	▼2.75
CPI(M) gain from BJP		Swing	7.54	

=== 2016 ===
There were 1,92,459 registered voters in Nemom Assembly constituency for the 2016 Kerala Assembly election.

2016 Kerala Legislative Assembly election: Nemom
Party	Candidate	Votes	%	±%
BJP	O. Rajagopal	67,813	47.46	▲9.97
CPI(M)	V. Sivankutty	59,142	41.39	▼1.60
JD(U)	V. Surendran Pillai	13,860	9.70	–
NOTA	None of the Above	884	0.62	–
Majority		8,671	6.07	▲0.57
Turnout		1,42,882	74.24	▲6.72
BJP gain from CPI(M)		Swing	5.79	

=== 2011 ===
This was the first election held after the 2008 delimitation. The boundaries of the constituency's boundaries were redrawn, and it now includes most parts of the former Thiruvananthapuram East consistuency. Major Parts Of Previous Nemam Constituency Was Added To Newly Formed Kattakada.There were 1,72,493 registered voters in the constituency for the 2011 Kerala Assembly election.

2011 Kerala Legislative Assembly election: Nemom
Party	Candidate	Votes	%	±%
CPI(M)	V. Sivankutty	50,076	42.99	▼1.20
BJP	O. Rajagopal	43,661	37.49	▲31.90
SJ(D)	Charupara Ravi	20,248	17.38	–
Majority		6,415	5.50	▼3.46
Turnout		1,16,474	67.52	▲0.65
CPI(M) win (new seat)				

=== 2006 ===
There were 1,79,417 registered voters in the constituency for the 2006 election.

2006 Kerala Legislative Assembly election: Nemom
Party	Candidate	Votes	%	±%
INC	N. Sakthan	60,884	50.74	
CPI(M)	Venganoor P Bhaskaran	50,135	41.79	
BJP	Malayinkeezhu Radhakrishnan	6,705	5.59	
Majority		10,749	8.96	
Turnout		1,19,982	66.87	
INC hold		Swing		

=== 2001 ===
There were 1,80,006 registered voters in the constituency for the 2001 election.

2001 Kerala Legislative Assembly election: Nemom
Party	Candidate	Votes	%	±%
INC	N. Sakthan	56,648	46.35	
CPI(M)	Venganoor P Bhaskaran	47,291	38.69	
BJP	M S Kumar	16,872	13.81	
Majority		9,357	7.66	
Turnout		1,22,215	67.91	
INC gain from CPI(M)		Swing		

=== 1996 ===
There were 1,68,220 registered voters in the constituency for the 1996 election.

1996 Kerala Legislative Assembly election: Nemom
Party	Candidate	Votes	%	±%
CPI(M)	Venganoor P Bhaskaran	51,139	46.43	
INC	K Mohankumar	47,543	43.16	
BJP	Madavoor Suresh	9,011	8.18	
Majority		3,596	3.27	
Turnout		1,10,143	67.02	
CPI(M) hold		Swing		

=== 1991 ===
There were 1,51,817 registered voters in the constituency for the 1991 election.

1991 Kerala Legislative Assembly election: Nemom
Party	Candidate	Votes	%	±%
CPI(M)	V J Thankappan	47,063	44.12	
CMP	Stanly Sathyanesan	40,201	37.69	
BJP	P Asok Kumar	17,072	16.00	
Majority		6,862	6.43	
Turnout		1,06,674	72.52	
CPI(M) hold		Swing		

== See also ==
- Nemom
- Thiruvananthapuram district
- List of constituencies of the Kerala Legislative Assembly
- 2016 Kerala Legislative Assembly election
