= Varkala Kahar =

Indian politician

Member of Kerala Legislative Assembly
- In office 2001–2016
- Constituency: Varkala

Personal details
- Born: 12 December 1950 (age 75) Thiruvananthapuram
- Party: Indian National Congress
- Spouse: Shaheeda Kahar
- Children: One son and one daughter

Varkala Kahar is an Indian politician who was a member of 13th, 14th and 15th Kerala Legislative Assembly. He belongs to Indian National Congress party and represented Varkala constituency. He was elected to Kerala Legislative Assembly in 2001, 2006 and 2011. In 2016, he lost to Left Democratic Front candidate V. Joy, thus ending a 15-year old stint. In 2026 Kerala Legislative Assembly election, he had contested again in the same constituency and failed to win against the incumbent legislator V. Joy.

== Political life ==
He started his political career as a student leader of Kerala Students Union. He was the college union speaker in S.N College, Varkala. He has served as the chairman of Kerala Head Load Workers' Welfare Fund Board. He is also the founder president of Thiruvananthapuram Head Load Workers' Union. He was a Haj Goodwill Delegate representing India.

== Personal life ==
He was born on 12 December 1950 at Varkala in Thiruvananthapuram district. He is the son of Abdulla Musaliar and Shereefa Beevi. He is married to Shaheeda Kahar and has two children.
