= Maranalloor =

- village
- Location in Kerala, India Maranalloor (India)
- Coordinates: 8.4735700°N 77.0644800°E
- Country: India
- State: Kerala
- District: Thiruvananthapuram

Government
  - Body: Gram panchayat

Population (2011)
  - Total: 36,550

Languages
  - Official: Malayalam, English
- Time zone: UTC+5:30 (IST)
- PIN: 695512
- Vehicle registration: KL-74

Maranalloor is a village in Thiruvananthapuram district in the state of Kerala, India.

Location

It is 18 km from Kerala State Road Transport Corporation's Central Bus Depot, Thampanoor. There are regular bus services to other parts of city also. It is only 6 kilometres from National Highway 47(Trivandrum-Nagercoil). Nearest towns are Balaramapuram, Kattakkada and Neyyattinkara.

Railway station is 3 km away. The railway line connects Kanyakumari and Thiruvananthapuram Central.

== Demographics ==
As of 2011 India census, Maranalloor had a population of 36550 with 17816 males and 18734 females.
