= Rajeev Chandrasekhar =

Indian politician and technocrat (born 1964)

Rajeev Chandrasekhar MLA
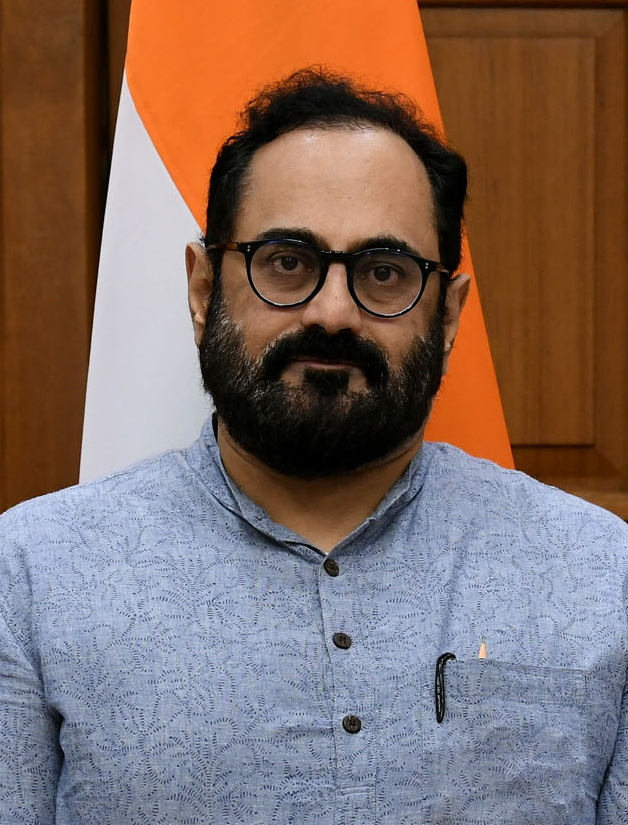
- Official portrait, 2021

Member of the Kerala Legislative Assembly
- Incumbent
- Assumed office 4 May 2026
- Preceded by: V. Sivankutty
- Constituency: Nemom

President of Bharatiya Janata Party, Kerala
- Incumbent
- Assumed office 24 March 2025
- National President: J. P. Nadda; Nitin Nabin
- Preceded by: K. Surendran

Union Minister of State for Electronics and Information Technology
- In office 7 July 2021 – 9 June 2024
- Prime Minister: Narendra Modi
- Minister: Ashwini Vaishnaw
- Preceded by: Sanjay Dhotre
- Succeeded by: Jitin Prasada

Union Minister of State for Skill Development and Entrepreneurship
- In office 7 July 2021 – 9 June 2024
- Prime Minister: Narendra Modi
- Minister: Dharmendra Pradhan
- Preceded by: R. K. Singh
- Succeeded by: Jayant Chaudhary (as MoS I/C)

Member of Parliament, Rajya Sabha
- In office 23 April 2006 – 2 April 2024
- Constituency: Karnataka

Personal details
- Born: 31 May 1964 (age 62) Ahmedabad, Gujarat, India
- Party: Bharatiya Janata Party
- Spouse: Anju Chandrasekhar
- Relations: T. P. G. Nambiar (father-in-law)
- Children: 2
- Education: Manipal Institute of Technology; Illinois Institute of Technology, Harvard University
- Occupation: Politician

Rajeev Chandrasekhar (born 31 May 1964) is an Indian politician, entrepreneur, and technocrat. He currently represents Nemom in the 16th Kerala Legislative Assembly since 2026. He is also the state president of BJP Kerala. A prominent voice in India's digital and economic policy, he is a former Union Minister, having served as the Minister of State for the Ministry of Electronics and Information Technology (MeitY), the Ministry of Skill Development and Entrepreneurship, and the Ministry of Jal Shakti.

Before his ministerial appointments, Rajeev served as a Member of Parliament (MP) in the Rajya Sabha representing Karnataka for multiple terms between 2006 and 2024. Initially serving as an independent MP elected with broad legislative support, he officially joined the Bharatiya Janata Party (BJP) in 2018. Within the National Democratic Alliance (NDA), he has also held the roles of national spokesperson and vice-chairman of the coalition's Keralam unit.

Throughout his parliamentary career, Rajeev has been instrumental in shaping national policy, serving as a Member of the Joint Committee on the Data Protection Bill, 2019, the Parliamentary Standing Committee on Finance, the Public Accounts Committee (PAC), and the Consultative Committee on MoE & IT. He has also been a member of the Indian Council for World Affairs and served on the Rajya Sabha Select Committees for both the GST and Real Estate bills.

== Early life and education ==
Rajeev Chandrasekhar was born to a Malayali Nair family in Ahmedabad, Gujarat. His father, M. K. Chandrasekhar, was an Air Commodore in the Indian Air Force and a trainer of Rajesh Pilot, and his mother is Anandavalli Amma. His family hails from Kerala.

Rajeev Chandrasekhar studied at St. Paul's Convent School in Thrissur and completed his schooling at Kendriya Vidyalaya in Bengaluru. He then studied electrical engineering at the Manipal Institute of Technology. He obtained his master's degree in computer science in 1988 from the Illinois Institute of Technology in Chicago.

== Career ==
=== Entrepreneur ===
In 1991, after returning to India, Rajeev Chandrasekhar joined the BPL Group. In 1994, he founded BPL Mobile, which grew into one of the major telecom companies in India, holding key licenses in markets such as Mumbai. In July 2005, he sold his 64 per cent stake in BPL Communications to the Essar Group for US$1.1 billion.

Rajeev founded Jupiter Capital in 2005, with an initial investment of US$100 million. The investment firm has investments and managed assets of over US$800 million in technology, media, hospitality, and entertainment.

In April 2013, Rajeev was awarded an honorary degree by Visvesvaraya Technological University, Belgaum, in recognition of his work as an entrepreneur.

=== Media ===
In 2006, Rajeev Chandrasekhar expanded into media by acquiring a majority stake in Asianet Communications through Jupiter Capital Private Limited. In late 2008, he formed a joint venture with News Corp, establishing Asianet Star Communications.

Asianet News Network Private Limited, incorporated in May 2008 under his leadership, serves as the holding company for key outlets including Asianet News, Asianet Suvarna News, and the digital portal Newsable.

In 2016, his group invested approximately ₹60 crore in ARG Outlier Media, supporting the launch of Republic TV. Following his election to the Rajya Sabha as a BJP member in 2018, the stake was diluted in compliance with parliamentary disclosure norms in 2019.

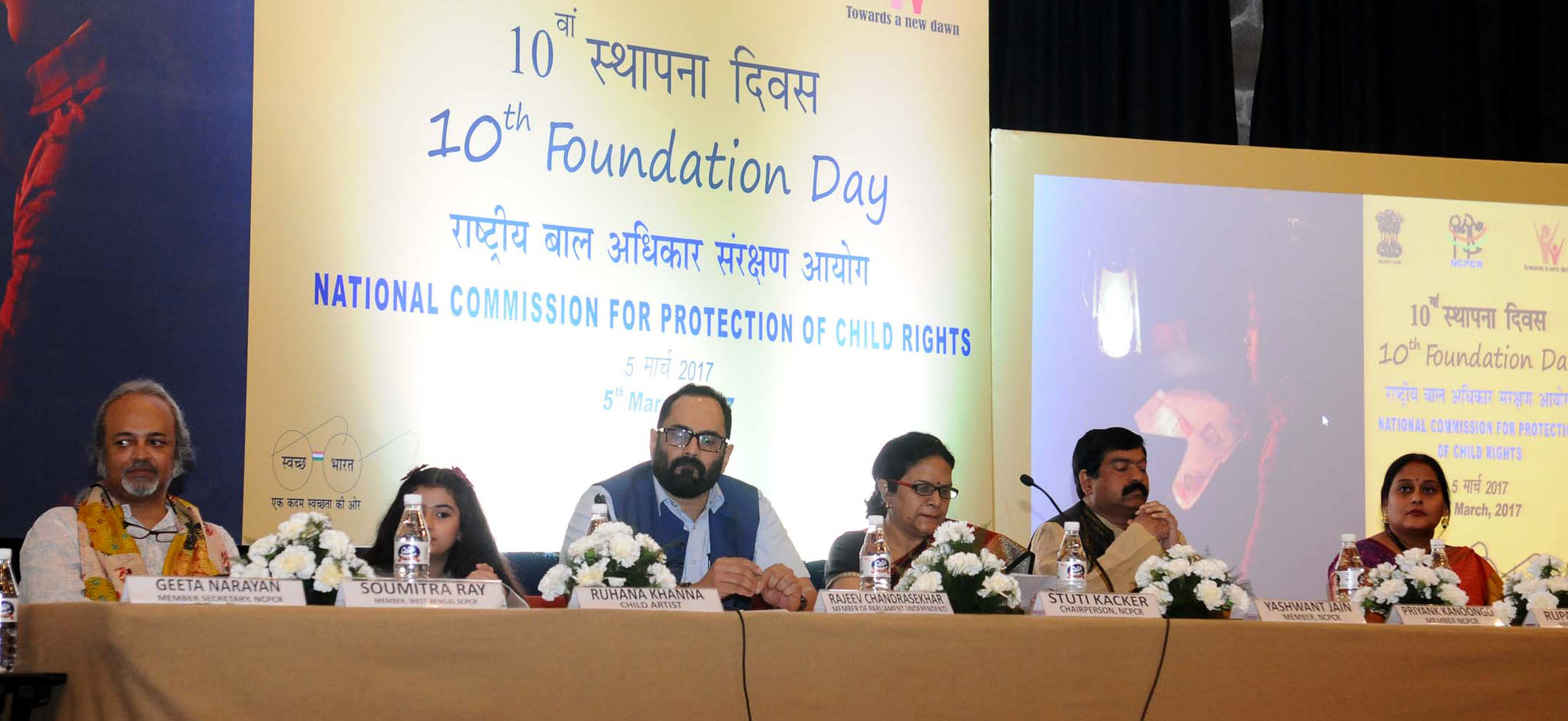
Rajeev at the 10th Foundation Day of the National Commission for Protection of Child Rights in 2017

=== Politics ===
Member of Parliament

Rajeev began his parliamentary career as an Independent member of the Rajya Sabha representing Karnataka, serving from April 2006 to April 2018. In April 2018, he was re-elected to the Rajya Sabha from Karnataka for a third six-year term as a member of the Bharatiya Janata Party (BJP).

Political Career and Ministerial Roles

In July 2021, Rajeev was inducted into the Second Modi ministry as a Minister of State. Leveraging his background as a technocrat, he was assigned key portfolios, serving concurrently as the Minister of State for the Ministry of Electronics and Information Technology (MeitY), the Ministry of Skill Development and Entrepreneurship, and the Ministry of Jal Shakti. Prior to his ministerial tenure, he served as a national spokesperson for the BJP.

In the 2024 Lok Sabha elections, Rajeev was fielded as the BJP candidate for the Thiruvananthapuram constituency in Kerala. In a highly competitive contest, he secured a significant vote share but lost to the incumbent MP Shashi Tharoor by a narrow margin of 16,077 votes. Following the election, Rajeev continued to expand his political leadership in Keralam, subsequently taking on the role of state president of BJP Keralam.

In the April 2026 Kerala Legislative Assembly elections, Chandrasekhar contested from the Nemom constituency as the BJP-NDA candidate. He reclaimed the seat for the party by defeating the incumbent General Education Minister and CPI(M) candidate V. Sivankutty by a margin of 4,978 votes. Chandrasekhar secured 57,192 votes (a 40.75% vote share), overcoming both Sivankutty and Indian National Congress candidate K. S. Sabarinadhan. His vote share was the highest among all NDA candidates in the state during the 2026 elections.

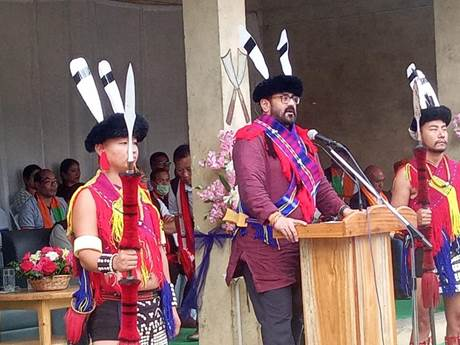
Rajeev Chandrasekhar in 2022 at Nagaland

== Personal life ==
Rajeev is married to Anju Chandrasekhar (m. 1991), the daughter of T. P. G. Nambiar, the founder of BPL Group. They have a son, Ved, and a daughter Devika.

== Awards and accolades ==
- Honoured by Army's Western Command GOC-in Commendation for his work for the Armed Forces and Veterans.
- India Today magazine ranked him #41st in India's 50 Most Powerful People of 2017 list.

Year	Name	Awarding organization	Ref.
2007	IIT Global Service Award.	Illinois Institute of Technology, Chicago.	
2013	Honorary Doctor of Science	Visvesvaraya Technological University, Belgaum	
2013	Distinguished Alumnus Award	Manipal Institute of Technology	
2016	GOC-in-C Commendation	Indian Army Western Command	
