= V. Sivankutty =

Indian politician (Kerala)

V Sivankutty
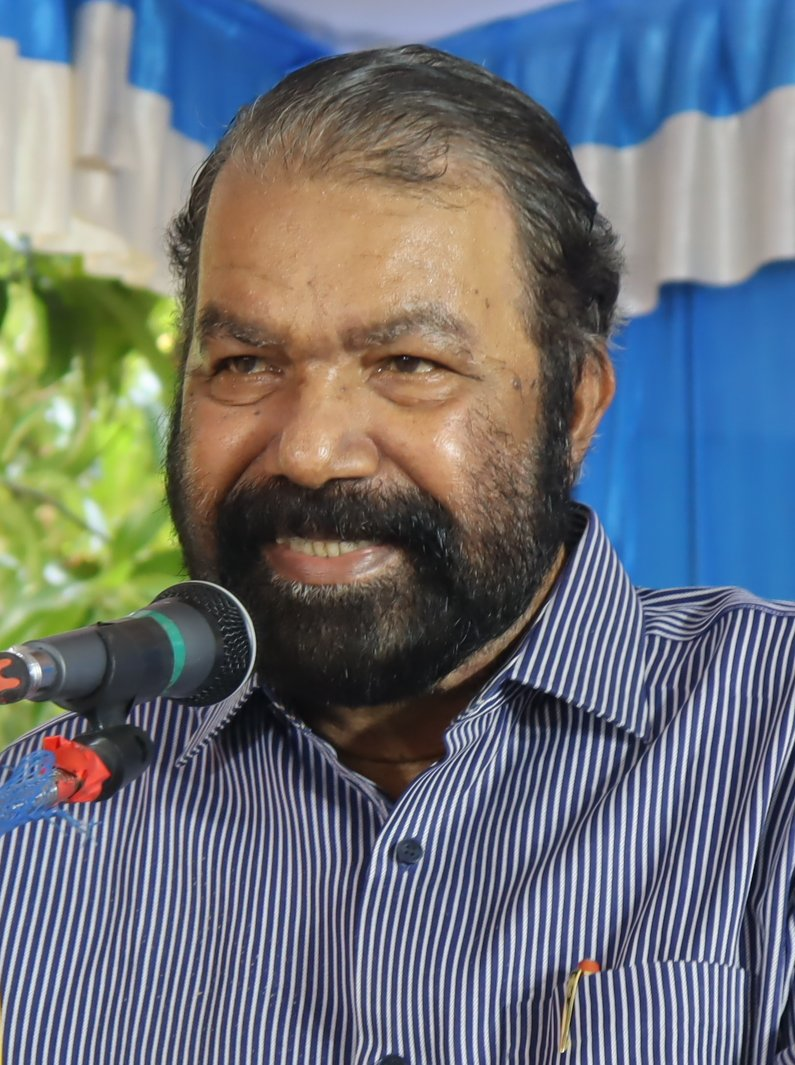

Former Minister for General Education & Labour, Government of Kerala
- In office 20 May 2021 – 23 May 2026
- Chief Minister: Pinarayi Vijayan
- Departments: General Education Department; Labour and Skills Department
- Portfolios: List: General Education; Literacy Movement; Labour; Employment and Training; Skills; Rehabilitation; Factories and Boilers; Insurance Medical Service; Industrial Tribunals; Labour Courts
- Preceded by: C. Raveendranath (General Education); T. P. Ramakrishnan (Labour)
- Succeeded by: N. Samsudheen (General Education); Bindu Krishna (Labour); Shibu Baby John (Skills Development)

Member of the Kerala Legislative Assembly
- In office 24 May 2021 – 23 May 2026
- Preceded by: O. Rajagopal
- Succeeded by: Rajeev Chandrasekhar
- Constituency: Nemom
- In office 13 May 2011 – 19 May 2016
- Preceded by: N. Sakthan
- Succeeded by: O Rajagopal
- Constituency: Nemom
- In office 11 May 2006 – 13 May 2011
- Preceded by: B. Vijayakumar
- Succeeded by: Constituency abolished
- Constituency: Thiruvananthapuram East

Personal details
- Born: 10 November 1954 (age 72) Cheruvakkal, Trivandrum, State of Travancore–Cochin (present day Kerala), India
- Party: Communist Party of India (Marxist)
- Spouse: R. Parvathy Devi
- Children: 1

Vasudevan Sivankutty (born 10 November 1954) is an Indian politician and the retired Minister for General Education and Labour, Government of Kerala from 2021 to 2026. He represented the Nemom Constituency in the 15th Kerala Legislative Assembly.

Sivankutty is a State Committee Member of the Communist Party of India (Marxist) in Kerala and the State Secretary of the Centre of Indian Trade Unions (CITU) Kerala, and the District President of CITU, Thiruvananthapuram.

== Early life ==
Sivankutty was born on 10 November 1954 at Cheruvakkal, Thiruvananthapuram, as the son of activist M. Vasudevan and P. Krishnamma. After schooling, he did his Bachelor of Arts (B.A.) at the Sree Narayana College, Chempazhanthy. He then completed his Bachelor of Law (LL.B.) from Kerala Law Academy, Thiruvananthapuram. He was a member of S.F.I. during his studies.

Sivankutty is married to writer, journalist, women's rights activist, and a former Kerala Public Service Commission (P.S.C.) member R. Parvathi Devi, who is the daughter of the Marxist theorist P. Govinda Pillai. The couple has a son, P. Govind Sivan, who is currently a research student at the Manipal University. Elina George is his daughter-in-law.

== Political career ==
Kerala Education minister V SIVANKUTTY SPEECH

Sivankutty entered politics through the Students' Federation of India (SFI) and has held positions such as its District President, State President, District Secretary, State Secretary and All India Joint Secretary. From SFI, he joined the Centre of Indian Trade Unions (CITU), and currently holds positions such as its State Secretary and District President.

He was the President of the erstwhile Ulloor Panchayat, the Mayor of Thiruvananthapuram Corporation, the Joint Secretary of the All India Mayors’ Council, the MLA of Thiruvananthapuram East and then Nemom (2011 - 2016).

In the recently concluded Kerala Assembly Elections, he got defeated by BJP's Rajeev Chandrasekhar. He was a Minister in the Pinarayi Vijayan-led LDF cabinet, handling portfolios of General Education and Labour. The other departments which he previously held were Literacy Movement, Employment and Training, Skills, Rehabilitation, Factories and Boilers, Insurance Medical Service, Industrial Tribunals, and Labour Courts.

== Controversies ==
=== 2015 Budget Presentation Ruckus ===
The Assembly witnessed ugly scenes after the Opposition MLAs attempted to prevent the Finance Minister from presenting the budget. His photos were so familiar leading the protest with the cable, sound system and monitor. Sivankutty was the major leader who opposed and created panic in assembly. Other accused in the case are minister K T Jaleel, E P Jayarajan, C K Sadasivan, K Ajith and Kunhahamed Master.Violent legislators had toppled the Speaker’s chair and threw the microphones away. The House suffered damages worth 2 lakh in the incident. Charges against the accused include relevant section of Prevention of Destruction of Public Property Act and IPC sections 447 (criminal trespass) and 427 (mischief causing damage).

The government moved the court based on a letter filed by V. Sivankutty. Several others, including Opposition leader Ramesh Chennithala, had filed petition.

=== 2023 Ambulance incident ===
On 12 July 2023, a pilot vehicle in Sivankutty's convoy, driving on the wrong side of the road, crashed a police jeep onto the side of ambulance van. This led to the injury of three people (including the patient). The incident took place in Kottarakkara in Kollam district when a driver from the minister's convoy. Sivankutty reportedly stepped out of the vehicle for a few minutes, inspected van, then continued towards Thiruvananthapuram. The police was criticised by the victims for not intervening or filing an FIR.
