= V. Joy =

Indian politician

Adv. V. Joy
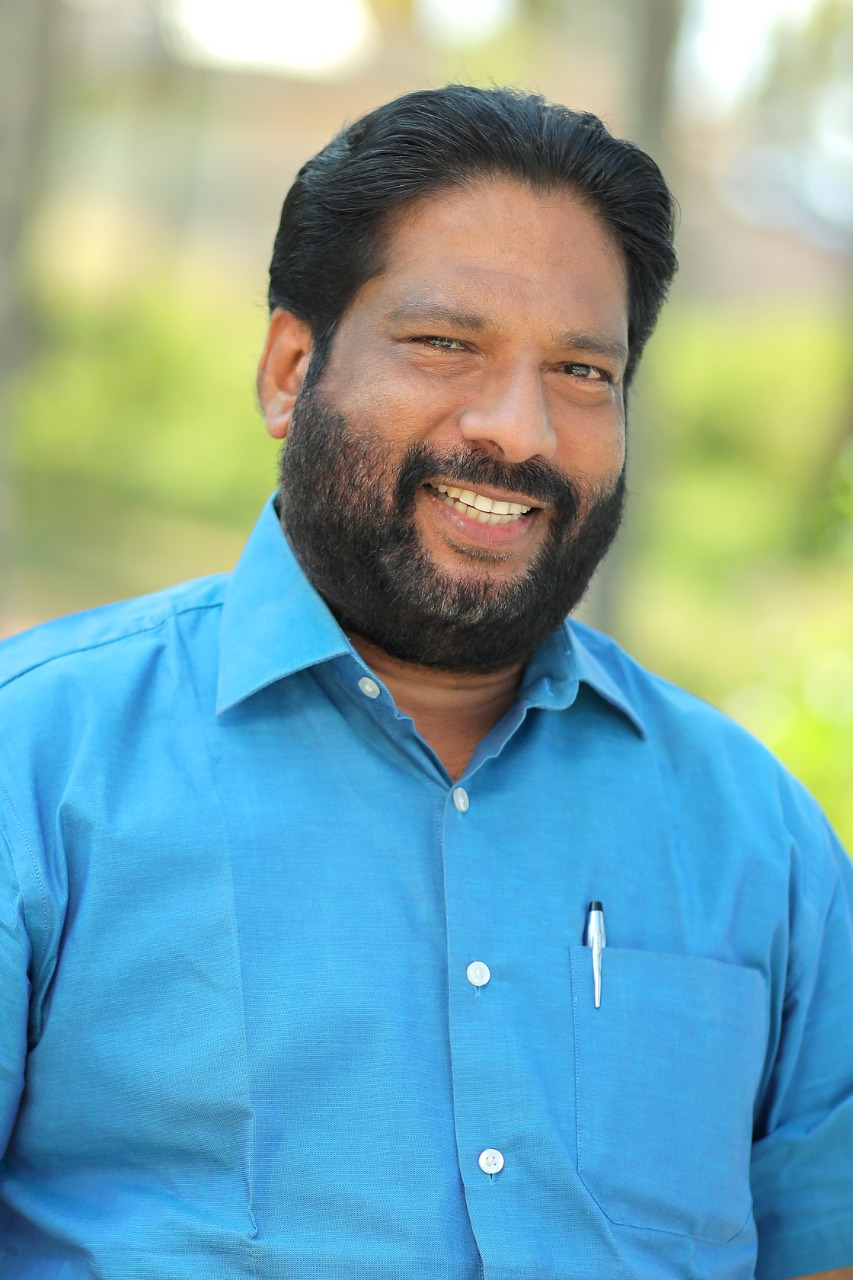

Member of the Kerala Legislative Assembly
- Incumbent
- Assumed office 2 June 2016
- Preceded by: Varkala Kahar
- Constituency: Varkala

Personal details
- Born: 10 May 1965 (age 61) Perunguzhi, Chirayinkeezhu, Trivandrum
- Party: Communist Party of India (Marxist)
- Spouse: S.Sunitha
- Children: 2
- Education: Kerala Law Academy

Vijayan Joy (born 10 May 1965) is a member of the 16th Kerala Assembly. He represents Varkala constituency. He is the current secretary of CPI (M) Thiruvananthapuram district committee and State Committee Member of Communist Party of India (Marxist), Kerala.

== Education and Political career ==
Chirayinkeezhu Sreechithira Vilasam School Leader, Chempazhanthi SN College University Union Councilor, University of Kerala Union Executive Member, Senate Member, SFI District President, District Secretary, DYFI District Vice President. Proved excellence in performance. Contested the Grama Panchayat of Azhoor twice and became the President twice. He then contested the Chirayinkeezhu Block Panchayat and was elected president. Later Member of the Thiruvananthapuram District Panchayat.

He is currently the State President of the Kerala Primary Cooperative Societies Association. He has been a Member of the Board of Directors of the District Co-operative Bank and Vice President of the State Co-operative Bank, Kumaranasan Memorial Governing Board Member, President of the Perumkuzhi Service Co-operative Bank.

Joy had contested the uncertain Varkala constituency in 2016, capturing more than 2,000 votes and capturing the constituency with a majority of 17,821 in the second round. Considering this fighting spirit, Joy was elected as a member of the CPM state committee.
