= I. B. Sathish =

Indian politician

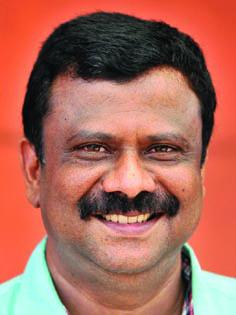

Former Member of the Kerala Legislative Assembly
- In office 2016–2026
- Succeeded by: M R Baiju
- Constituency: Kattakkada

Personal details
- Born: 20 May 1970 (age 56) Thiruvananthapuram
- Party: Communist Party of India (Marxist)
- Spouse: 1
- Children: 2

I. Balakrishnan Nair Sathish (ഐ ബി സതീഷ്) is an Indian politician. He served as a member of the 14th and 13th Kerala Legislative Assembly. He represented the Kattakkada constituency and belongs to the Communist Party of India (Marxist). He won by defeating N. Sakthan, speaker of the 13th Kerala Legislative Assembly, by a margin of 849 votes.

He is a member of CPIM Thiruvananthapuram District Committee. He is an advocate by profession.

== Early life ==
Sathish was born on 20 May 1970 to P. Balakrishnan Nair and K. Indira Devi. He completed his education from Kattakkada Christian College and Kerala Law Academy. Sathish entered politics through Balasangam and student movements. During his student years, he became active in the Students' Federation of India and held several organizational positions, including Chairman of Kattakada Christian College Union and Chairman of University of Kerala Union. He later served as District President of SFI Thiruvananthapuram and District President of the Democratic Youth Federation of India (DYFI) Thiruvananthapuram before rising within the Communist Party of India (Marxist). He was the Area Secretary of CPIM in Kattakada.

He married P. H. Suja, who works as Deputy State Librarian in the State Central Library, Kerala . They have a son and a daughter.

== Career ==
Sathish was the CPI(M) candidate from Kattakkada in the 2016 Kerala Legislative Assembly election. He won the seat by defeating then speaker N. Sakthan by 849 votes.

He was re-elected in the 2021 Kerala Legislative Assembly election with an increased majority. As an MLA, he associated with development initiatives in infrastructure, education, environmental protection, and local welfare activities.

== Projects ==
Our Onam, Our Flowers project – A large-scale floriculture initiative that converted 60 acres of barren land in Kattakkada to marigold cultivation to reduce Kerala's dependence on imported flowers during Onam.

Vision Kattakkada – A constituency development programme aimed at growth in infrastructure, entrepreneurship, waste management, water conservation, education, and sustainability. The project involved cooperation between local bodies, government departments, and planning agencies.

Jalsamriddhi water conservation programme – A constituency-level initiative under Vision Kattakkada aimed at water conservation and sustainable resource management.

Carbon-Neutral Kattakkada Project – An environmental sustainability programme focusing on eco-friendly development, waste management, green initiatives, and climate-conscious local governance.

Kattal Industrial Development Council (KIDC) – An initiative chaired by Sathish to promote industrial and entrepreneurial development in Kattakkada. Through investor summits and business outreach programmes, the project sought investments in sectors such as IT, tourism, green technology, healthcare, and manufacturing.
