= Kattakada =

- Town
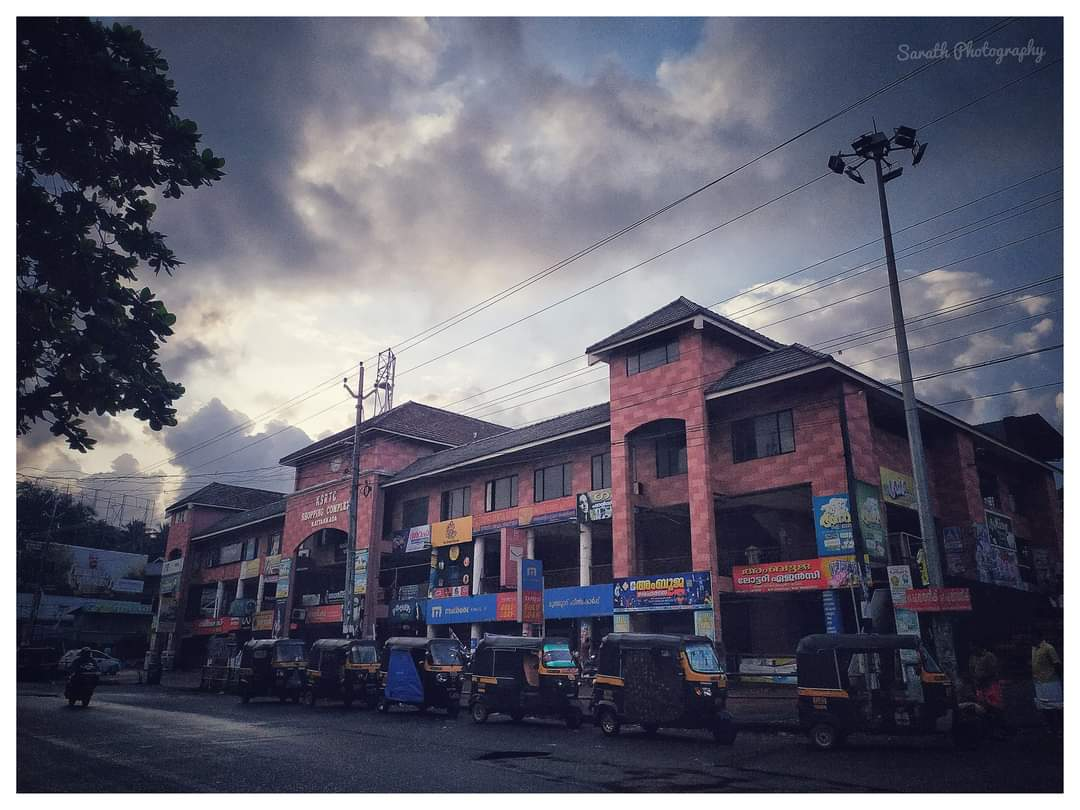
- Kattakkada Bus terminal and shopping complex

- Location in Kerala, India Kattakada (India)
- Coordinates: 8.5033°N 77.0852°E
- Country: India
- State: Kerala
- District: Thiruvananthapuram district

Government
  - Body: Kattakada Grama Panchayath

Area
  - Total: 22.54 km^{2} (8.70 sq mi)

Population (2011)
  - Total: 40,448
  - Density: 1,794/km^{2} (4,648/sq mi)

Languages
  - Official: Malayalam, English
- Time zone: UTC+5:30 (IST)
- PIN: 695572
- Telephone code: 0471
- Vehicle registration: KL-74

Kattakada is a town in Thiruvananthapuram district of Kerala. It is situated 13 km north of Neyyattinkara town, 18 km south of Nedumangad town and 20 km east of the Capital City, Thiruvananthapuram.

There is also a Tehsil/Taluk called Kattakada. It comprises 14 revenue villages and 12 Panchayats that surround the town. This taluk was formed in February 2014.

The place name Kattakkada is derived from the Kattaal Devi Temple situated in the town. The word Kattaal in Malayalam translates to Wild Banyan Tree.

It includes Neyyar Dam and Amboori.
