= List of by-elections to the Kerala Legislative Assembly =

The following is a list of by-elections held for the Kerala Legislative Assembly, India, since its formation in 1956.

== 12th Assembly ==
=== 2012 ===
S.No	Date	Constituency	MLA before election	Party before election	Elected MLA	Party after election
85	17 March 2012	Piravom	T. M. Jacob	Kerala Congress (Jacob)	Anoop Jacob	Kerala Congress (Jacob)
140	2 June 2012	Neyyattinkara	R. Selvaraj	Communist Party of India (Marxist)	R. Selvaraj	Indian National Congress

=== 2015 ===
S.No	Date	Constituency	MLA before election	Party before election	Elected MLA	Party after election
1	27 June 2015	Aruvikkara	G. Karthikeyan	Indian National Congress	K. S. Sabarinadhan	Indian National Congress

== 13th Assembly ==
=== 2017 ===
S.No	Date	Constituency	MLA before election	Party before election	Elected MLA	Party after election
41	11 October 2017	Vengara	P.K. Kunhalikutty	Indian Union Muslim League	K. N. A. Khader	Indian Union Muslim League

=== 2018 ===
S.No	Date	Constituency	MLA before election	Party before election	Elected MLA	Party after election
1	28 May 2018	Chengannur	K. K. Ramachandran Nair	Communist Party of India (Marxist)	Saji Cherian	Communist Party of India (Marxist)

=== 2019 ===
S.No	Date	Constituency	MLA before election	Party before election	Elected MLA	Party after election
1	23 September 2019	Pala	K. M. Mani	Kerala Congress (M)	Mani C. Kappan	Nationalist Congress Party
2	21 October 2019	Manjeshwaram	P. B. Abdul Razak	Indian Union Muslim League	M. C. Kamaruddin	Indian Union Muslim League
3	21 October 2019	Aroor	A. M. Ariff	Communist Party of India (Marxist)	Shanimol Usman	Indian National Congress
4	21 October 2019	Ernakulam	Hibi Eden	Indian National Congress	T. J. Vinod	Indian National Congress
5	21 October 2019	Konni	Adoor Prakash	Indian National Congress	K. U. Jenish Kumar	Communist Party of India (Marxist)
6	21 October 2019	Vattiyoorkavu	K. Muraleedharan	Indian National Congress	V. K. Prasanth	Communist Party of India (Marxist)

== 14th Assembly ==
=== 2022 ===
Date	S.No	Constituency	MLA before election	Party before election	Elected MLA	Party after election
31 May 2022	83	Thrikkakara	P. T. Thomas	Indian National Congress	Uma Thomas	Indian National Congress

=== 2023 ===
Date	S.No	Constituency	MLA before election	Party before election	Elected MLA	Party after election	Reason
5 September 2023	98	Puthuppally	Oommen Chandy	Indian National Congress	Chandy Oommen	Indian National Congress	Death of Oommen Chandy

=== 2024 ===
Date	Constituency		Previous MLA		Reason	Elected MLA	
20 November 2024	56	Palakkad	Shafi Parambil	Indian National Congress	Elected to Lok Sabha on 4 June	Rahul Mamkootathil	Indian National Congress
13 November 2024	61	Chelakkara	K. Radhakrishnan	Communist Party of India (Marxist)	Elected to Lok Sabha on 4 June	U. R. Pradeep	Communist Party of India (Marxist)

=== 2025 ===
Date	Constituency		Previous MLA		Reason	Elected MLA	
19 June 2025	84	Nilambur	P. V. Anvar	Independent	Resigned on 13 January 2025	Aryadan Shoukath	Indian National Congress
