= Mannanmoola =

Mannammoola
- Location in Kerala, India
- Coordinates: 8.537250°N 76.96650°E
- Country: India
- State: Kerala
- District: Thiruvananthapuram
- Talukas: Thiruvananthapuram

Government
  - Body: Corporation of Thiruvananthapuram

Languages
  - Official: Malayalam, English
- Time zone: UTC+5:30 (IST)
- PIN: 695005
- Vehicle registration: KL 01
- Literacy: 95%
- Civic agency: Corporation of Thiruvananthapuram

Mannammoola is a residential locality near Peroorkada to the north eastern part of Thiruvananthapuram (Trivandrum) in the Indian state of Kerala, on the way to vattiyoorkavu. Once a remote village, Mannammoola has seen rapid development over the last decade with the setting up of several residential colonies. Mannammoola has one boundary demarked by the Killi River, which is crossed by the Mannammoola Bridge en route to Vattiyoorkavu. The other localities in Mannammoola's neighbourhood are Melathumele, Manikanteswaram, Thozhuvancodu, Oolampara etc. This area is part of Peroorkada Ward of the Corporation of Thiruvananthapuram and the elected Ward member is Mrs.P.Jameela Sreedharan.

== Etymology ==
The name Mannammoola comes from two words "mannan" and "moola" meaning the locality of mannans or the washermen. Nowadays the washermen exists only in the name of place. Its older name is Edakkulam.

== Amenities ==
Prominent institutions at Mannammoola include the Concordia school, Central Government Employees quarters, Subhananda Ashram etc. The area have seen a rapid rise in urbanisation with the setting up of the new civil station at Kudappanakunnu near Peroorkada, the nearest important locality of Mannammoola. Recently a few number of shops and shopping complexes are set up in the place. An ATM counter of SBI, a couple of Medical shops and several provision and utility shops are functioning. Some of the residential colonies are Mannamoola Residents Association (MRA), Chaithanya Gardens, VRA, GC Nagar, Surya Gardens, Co-Operative Housing Gardens, Devi Nagar etc. Salim brothers club is a major social welfare organisation based out of Mannammoola.

== Place of interest ==
Mannammoola has a number of temples, the most famous being the Edakkulam Devi temple. The other temples in the locality are Theruvil Bhagavathi temple, Theruvilparambu Temple etc. Manikanteswaram Siva temple, Thozhuvankodu bhagavathi temple, Kavallur temple are important temples in the immediate neighborhood. Subhananda ashram is having their ashram in Mannammoola.

== Transport ==
KSRTC is running several bus services in this route to down town Trivandrum and also to nearby localities like Peroorkada, Vattiyoorkavu, Nettayam, Kulashekharam, Kachani, Vellaikadavu etc. Multiple number of private buses are also running scheduled trips in this route. Auto Rickshaws are also available.

== People ==
The population of Mannammoola has been getting more cosmopolitan, though like in most other places of Kerala, way behind the standards set by other major suburbs.

== Recent past and growth ==
Mannammoola was a remote suburb of Thiruvananthapuram city until early 1990s with lush green paddy fields and low lying muddy trenches from the thriving fire brick business with a number of brick furnaces on the sides of the Killi river.

The locality expanded since the mid-1990s, when many government servants preferred to buy properties or build houses in this area of Thiruvananthapuram due to its proximity to downtown and the good amenities available in its 2 km circle at Peroorkada and Vattiyoorkavu as well as the accessibility of hospitals and well-run private schools.
