= AKG Nagar =

Village in Kerala, India

Coordinates: 8.542403°N 76.967125°E

AKG Nagar is a residential locality within Peroorkada, Thiruvananthapuram (Trivandrum) in the Indian state of Kerala.

There are 102 residential houses. It was developed into a colony 25-30 years back mainly by occupant government officials. As such the residents now belong to the second generation.
