= Puthoorkonam =

- suburb
- Country: India
- State: Kerala
- District: Thiruvananthapuram

Languages
- Time zone: UTC+5:30 (IST)
- PIN: 695013
- Telephone code: 0471
- Literacy: 100%%
- Climate: normal (Köppen)

Puthoorkonam is 1 km from Vattiyoorkavu in the Vattiyoorkavu-Peroorkada route, in Thiruvananthapuram, Kerala, India. Puthoorkonam is famous for the Devi Temple.

Kumbhabarani is an annual festival of the temple that is conducted for 5 days.
