= Mahadeva Temple, Kalanjoor =

Thrikkalanjoor Sree Mahadeva Temple
- തൃക്കലഞ്ഞൂര്‍ ശ്രീ മഹാദേവ ക്ഷേത്രം
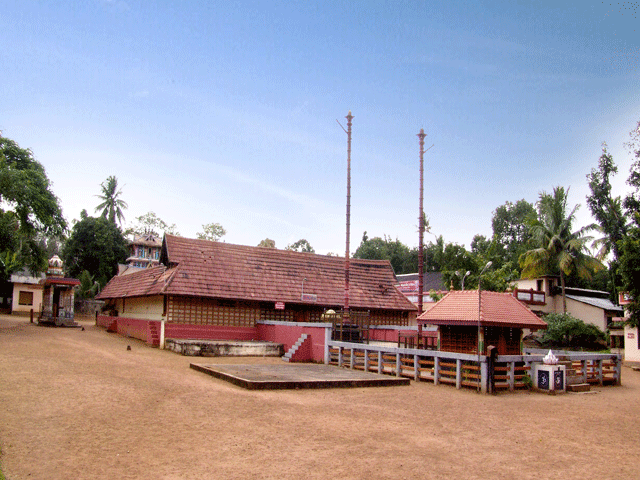

- Thrikkalanjoor Mahadeva Temple, Kalanjoor, Pathanamthitta, Kerala

Religion
- Affiliation: Hinduism
- District: Pathanamthitta
- Deity: Lord Shiva
- Governing body: Sankarapurathu Mukkalvattom Devaswom

Location
- Location: Kalanjoor
- State: Kerala
- Country: India
- Interactive map of Thrikkalanjoor Sree Mahadeva Temple
- Coordinates: 9°07′17″N 76°50′59″E

Architecture
- Type: Traditional Kerala style
- Completed: Records indicate the temple to be at least 1100 years old

Specifications
- Temple: One
- Elevation: 55.64 m (183 ft)

Mahadeva Temple, popularly known as Thrikkalanjoor Sree Mahadeva Temple, is a Hindu temple. It is 80 kilometers to the south-west of the Sabarimala temple on the Punalur-Muvattupuzha highway in Pathanamthitta district, Kerala, India. A banyan tree, flanked by an altar, is visible from a distance for any traveler on the main road, announcing the presence of the temple.

A Mandapa artistically etched with magnificent mural paintings announcing the prowess of artists and artisans of yore surrounds the banyan tree. Inside the Mandapam there is an idol of Nataraja, the dancing manifestation of Shiva, facing the east. From this Mandapam towards the west, a 60 feet high Gopuram (artistically carved towering arches) could be seen on the eastern side. The 18 ascending steps from the Gopuram lead to the sacred idols of Indiliyappan (Sastha) and the Mahasiva idol, which is the presiding deity of the temple.

Due to the presence of Mahadeva and Sastha idols in the temple, there are two Dhwajas (towering flag posts coated with copper) adjacent to each other which is a rare spectacle seldom seen in other temples. The Mahasiva idol and the Sastha idols are installed facing each other in this temple.

== Festivals ==
The annual temple festival starts in the Malayalam month of Meenam (March/April) and ends with Thiruvathira Arattu. The festival lasts eight days. On the sixth day Indilayappan festival is celebrated. Renowned artists from South India participate in this festival, which is famous for its Carnatic music renditions. Great exponents of Carnatic music like Chembai, Chemmankudi, Balamuralee Krishna, Yesudas, Seshagopal have performed here. Kathakali and other classical arts are other major attractions during the festival.

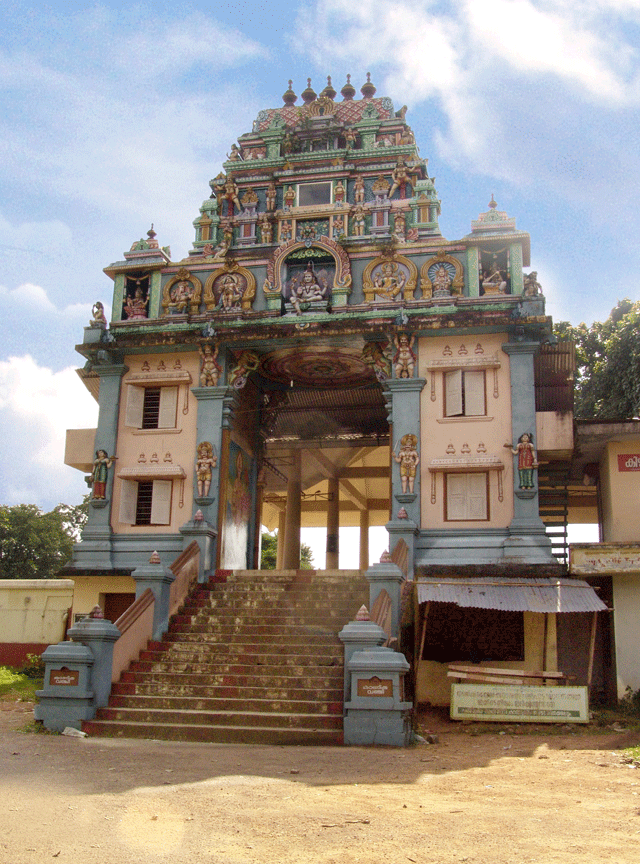
Kalanjoor Temple Gopuram at East

== See also ==
- Temples of Kerala
- List of Hindu temples in Kerala
