= Vattiyoorkavu Assembly constituency =

Constituency of the Kerala legislative assembly in India

Vattiyoorkavu
- Constituency No. 133 for the Kerala Legislative Assembly
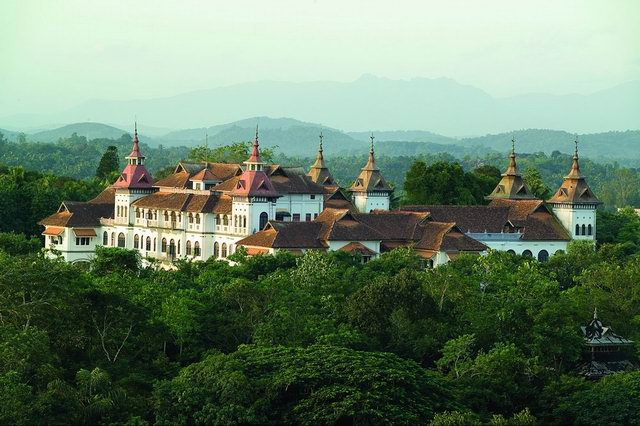
- Kowdiar Palace at Kowdiar ward of Thiruvananthapuram Corporation in Vattiyoorkavu Assembly constituency

Constituency details
- Country: India
- Region: South India
- State: Kerala
- District: Thiruvananthapuram
- Established: 2008
- Total electors: 1,65,272 (2026)
- Reservation: None

Member of Legislative Assembly
- 16th Kerala Legislative Assembly
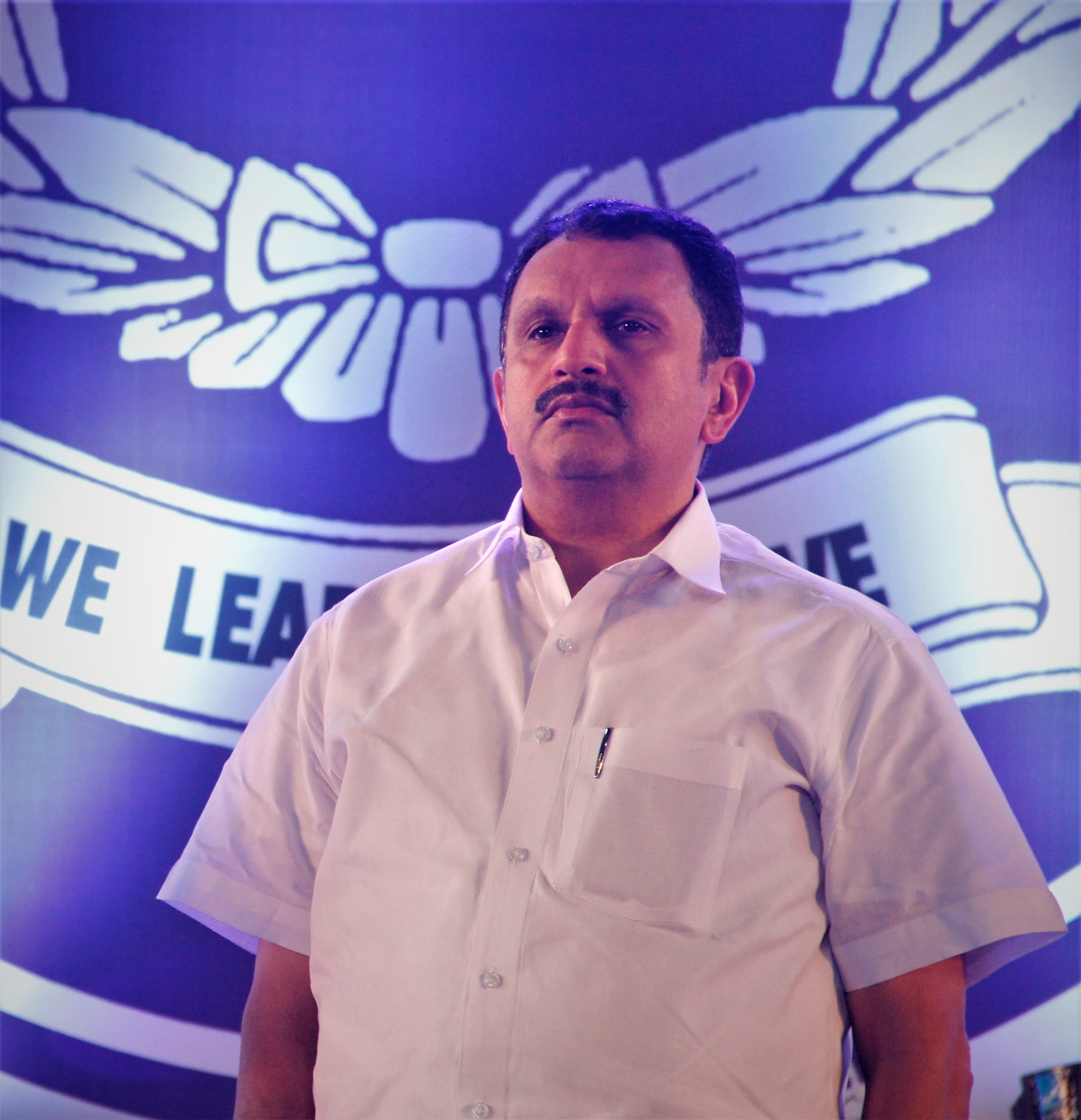
- Incumbent K. Muraleedharan
- Party: Indian National Congress
- Alliance: UDF
- Elected year: 2026

Vattiyoorkavu State assembly constituency is one of the 140 state legislative assembly constituencies in Kerala. It is also one of the seven state legislative assembly constituencies included in Thiruvananthapuram Lok Sabha constituency. As of the 2026 Assembly elections, the current MLA is K. Muraleedharan of the INC who is also the current Minister of Health and Devaswom, in the Government of Kerala.

== Local self-governed segments ==
Vattiyoorkavu Assembly constituency is composed of the following local self-governed segments:

Sl no.	Name	Wards	Status (Grama panchayat/Municipality/Municipal Corporation)	Taluk
1	Thiruvananthapuram	24 wards	Municipal Corporation	Thiruvananthapuram

== Members of the Legislative Assembly ==
The following list consists of all members of Kerala Legislative Assembly who have represented Vattiyoorkavu Assembly constituency during the period of various assemblies:

=== Trivandrum-II ===
Election	Member	Party
1957	Pattom Thanu Pillai	Praja Socialist Party
1960	Pattom Thanu Pillai	Praja Socialist Party
1967	K. C. Vamadevan	Independent
1970	K. Pankajakshan	Revolutionary Socialist Party (India)

=== Trivandrum North ===
Election	Member	Party
1977	K. Ravindran Nair	Independent
1980	K. Anirudhan	Communist Party of India (Marxist)
1982	G. Karthikeyan	Indian National Congress
1987	M. Vijayakumar	Communist Party of India (Marxist)
1991	M. Vijayakumar	Communist Party of India (Marxist)
1996	M. Vijayakumar	Communist Party of India (Marxist)
2001	K. Mohankumar	Indian National Congress
2006	M. Vijayakumar	Communist Party of India (Marxist)

=== Vattiyoorkavu ===
Election	Member	Party
2011	K. Muraleedharan	Indian National Congress
2016	K. Muraleedharan	Indian National Congress
2019*	V. K. Prasanth	Communist Party of India (Marxist)
2021	V. K. Prasanth	Communist Party of India (Marxist)
2026	K. Muraleedharan	Indian National Congress

*by-election

== Election results ==
=== 2026 ===
2026 Kerala Legislative Assembly election: Vattiyoorkavu
Party	Candidate	Votes	%	±%
INC	K. Muraleedharan	48,338	37.20	▲11.44
CPI(M)	V. K. Prasanth	42,913	33.10	▼11.30
BJP	R. Sreelekha	37,213	28.76	▼0.02
Margin of victory		5,425	4.10	▲11.44
Turnout		1,29,765	76.92	▲6.69
INC gain from CPI(M)		Swing	▲11.44	

=== 2021 ===
Percentage change (±%) denotes the change in the number of votes from the immediate previous election.

2021 Kerala Legislative Assembly election: Vattiyoorkavu
Party	Candidate	Votes	%	±%
CPI(M)	V. K. Prasanth	61,111	44.40	▲0.15
BJP	V. V. Rajesh	39,596	28.77	▲6.61
INC	Veena S. Nair	35,655	25.76	▼6.82
NOTA	None of the above	109	0.62	▼0.04
Margin of victory		21,515	15.63	▲3.96
Turnout		1,37,636		
CPI(M) hold		Swing	▲0.15	

=== 2019 by-election ===
Due to the election of the sitting MLA K. Muraleedharan as the MP from Vatakara Lok Sabha constituency, Vattiyoorkavu Assembly constituency held a by-election in 2019. There were 1,97,570 registered voters in Vattiyoorkavu Assembly constituency for this election. V. K. Prashanth won by 14,465 votes in the subsequent election conducted in October 2019.

2019 Kerala Legislative Assembly by-elections: Vattiyoorkavu
Party	Candidate	Votes	%	±%
CPI(M)	V. K. Prasanth	54,830	44.25	▲14.46
INC	K. Mohankumar	40,365	32.58	▼5.23
BJP	S. Suresh	27,453	22.16	▼10.03
NOTA	None of the Above	820	0.66	▲0.06
Majority		14,465	11.67	▲6.06
Turnout		1,23,910	62.66	▼7.17
CPI(M) gain from INC		Swing	▲14.46	

=== 2016 ===
There were 1,95,239 registered voters in Vattiyoorkavu Assembly constituency for the 2016 Kerala Legislative Assembly election.

2016 Kerala Legislative Assembly election: Vattiyoorkavu
Party	Candidate	Votes	%	±%
INC	K. Muraleedharan	51,322	37.81	▼12.38
BJP	Kummanam Rajasekharan	43,700	32.19	▲20.21
CPI(M)	T. N. Seema	40,441	29.79	▼6.05
BSP	Mekkansi K. John	399	0.29	N/A
NOTA	None of the Above	816	0.60	N/A
Independent	Binu D.	147	0.11	
Independent	Sahadevan	104	0.08	
Independent	K. G. Mohanan	77	0.06	
Independent	Baby D.	53	0.04	
Independent	Saju Ameerdas	48	0.04	
Majority		7,622	5.56	▼8.79
Turnout		1,37,108	70.23	▲6.01
INC hold		Swing	▼12.38	

=== 2011 ===
There were 1,75,398 registered voters in the constituency for the 2011 election.

2011 Kerala Legislative Assembly election: Vattiyoorkavu
Party	Candidate	Votes	%	±%
INC	K. Muraleedharan	56,531	50.19	
LDF	Cheriyan Phillip	40,364	35.84	
BJP	V. V. Rajesh	13,494	11.98	
BSP	Kaithakodu Radhakrishnan	915	0.81	
Independent	Cheriyan P. T.	551	0.49	
Independent	Rajan K.	488	0.08	
Independent	G. Balakrishnan Nair	294	0.26	
Majority		16,167	14.35	
Turnout		1,12,637	64.22	
INC win (new seat)				

=== 2006 ===
2006 Kerala Legislative Assembly election: Trivandrum North
Party	Candidate	Votes	%	±%
CPI(M)	M. Vijayakumar	60,145	50.60	
INC	K. Mohankumar	50,421	42.52	
Majority		9,724	8.18	
Turnout		1,18,845		
CPI(M) gain from INC		Swing		

=== 2001 ===
There were 2,11,264 registered voters in the constituency for the 2001 election.

2001 Kerala Legislative Assembly election: Trivandrum North
Party	Candidate	Votes	%	±%
INC	K. Mohankumar	63,202	48.97	
CPI(M)	M. Vijayakumar	56,818	44.03	
Majority		6,384	4.94	
Turnout		1,29,052	61.20	
INC gain from CPI(M)		Swing		

=== 1996 ===
There were 1,87,779 registered voters in the constituency for the 1996 election.

1996 Kerala Legislative Assembly election: Trivandrum North
Party	Candidate	Votes	%	±%
CPI(M)	M. Vijayakumar	62,479	52.79	
INC	T. Saratchandra Prasad	48,170	40.70	
Majority		14,309	12.70	
Turnout		1,18,364	63.84	
CPI(M) hold		Swing		

=== 1991 ===
There were 1,73,461 registered voters in the constituency for the 1991 election.

1991 Kerala Legislative Assembly election: Trivandrum North
Party	Candidate	Votes	%	±%
CPI(M)	M. Vijayakumar	52,865	46.21	
NDP	T. Raveendran Thampi	52,525	45.91	
Majority		340	0.30	
Turnout		1,14,408	68.05	
CPI(M) hold		Swing		

=== 1987 ===
There were 1,40,159 registered voters in the constituency for the 1987 election.

1987 Kerala Legislative Assembly election: Trivandrum North
Party	Candidate	Votes	%	±%
CPI(M)	M. Vijayakumar	53,167	49.99	
INC	G. Karthikeyan	38,002	35.73	
Majority		15,165	14.26	
Turnout		1,06,360	76.47	
CPI(M) gain from INC		Swing		

=== 1982 ===
There were 1,06,347 registered voters in the constituency for the 1982 election.

1982 Kerala Legislative Assembly election: Trivandrum North
Party	Candidate	Votes	%	±%
INC	G. Karthikeyan	38,260	54.38	
CPI(M)	K. Anirudhan	29,414	41.81	
Majority		8,846	12.57	
Turnout		70,352	66.82	
INC gain from CPI(M)		Swing		

== See also ==
- Vattiyoorkavu
- Thiruvananthapuram district
- List of constituencies of the Kerala Legislative Assembly
- 2016 Kerala Legislative Assembly election
- 2019 Kerala Legislative Assembly by-elections
