= 2019 Kerala Legislative Assembly by-elections =

Kerala Legislative Assembly by-election

- 23 September 2019 (1 seat); 21 October 2019 (5 seats)

Manjeshwar, Ernakulam, Pala, Aroor, Konni and Vattiyoorkavu Niyamasabha constituencies
- Turnout: 70.11%
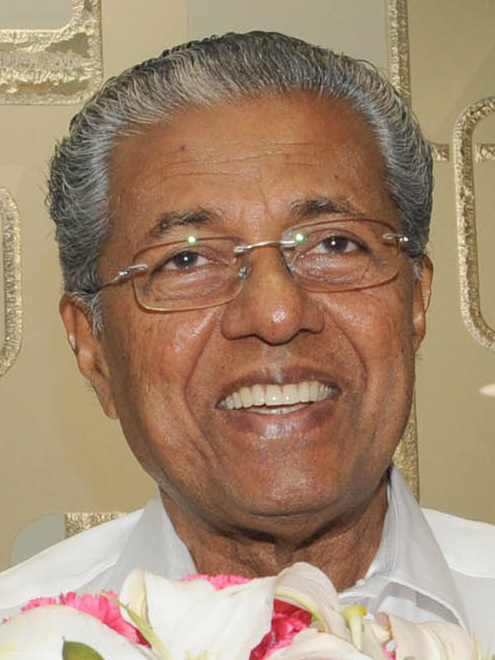

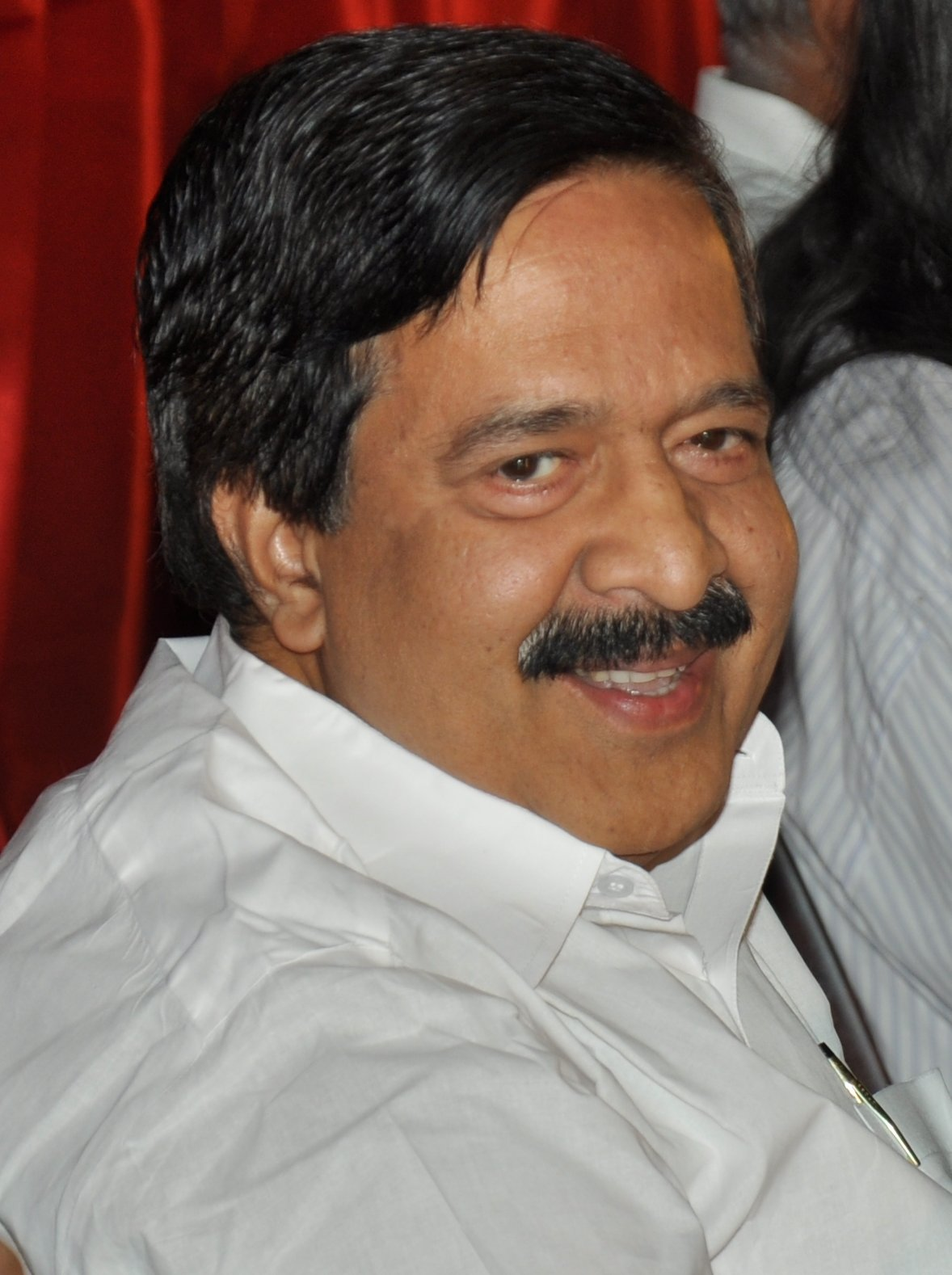
	First party	Second party
Leader	Pinarayi Vijayan	Ramesh Chennithala
Party	CPI(M)	INC
Alliance	LDF	UDF
Leader's seat	Dharmadom	Haripad
Last election	1	5
Seats won	3	3
Seat change	▲2	▼2
Popular vote	302,717	308,359
Percentage	37.97%	38.68%
Swing	▲1.53%	▼1.78%
Chief Minister before election
Pinarayi Vijayan
CPI(M)
Chief Minister
Pinarayi Vijayan
CPI(M)

Six assembly by-elections were held on 23 September and 21 October 2019, to the six vacant seats in the Kerala Niyamasabha which consists of 140 constituencies in total.

By-election took place in two phases. The first phase was conducted on 23 September for Pala Constituency. The remaining 5 assembly constituencies (Manjeshwar, Ernakulam, Aroor, Konni and Vattiyoorkavu) voted to elect their representatives on 21 October. The counting of votes was conducted on 27 September in Pala and on 24 October in the other five constituencies.

== Schedule for the by-elections ==
=== Pala ===
The first phase by-election was held for the Pala Constituency in Kerala.

By-Election Event	Day	Date
Election Declaration	Sunday	25/08/2019
Issue of Gazette Notification	Wednesday	28/08/2019
Last date of filing Nomination	Wednesday	04/09/2019
Scrutiny of Nominations	Thursday	05/09/2019
Last date of withdrawal of candidatures	Saturday	07/09/2019
Polling	Monday	23/09/2019
Counting of votes	Friday	27/09/2019

=== Manjeshwaram, Ernakulam, Aroor, Konni and Vattiyoorkavu ===
The second phase by-elections were held for the remaining 5 vacant assembly constituencies in Kerala.

By-Election Event	Day	Date
Election Declaration	Saturday	21/09/2019
Issue of Gazette Notification	Monday	23/09/2019
Last date of filing Nomination	Monday	30/09/2019
Scrutiny of Nominations	Tuesday	01/10/2019
Last date of withdrawal of candidatures	Thursday	03/10/2019
Polling	Monday	21/10/2019
Counting of votes	Thursday	24/10/2019

== Electorates ==
There were 11,36,616 electorates from the 6 niyamasabha constituencies where the by-elections were held. Constituency wise details are given below:

Number	Constituency	Electorates
1	Manjeshwar	2,14,779
82	Ernakulam	1,55,306
93	Pala	1,79,107
102	Aroor	1,91,898
114	Konni	1,97,956
133	Vattiyoorkavu	1,97,570

== Alliances and parties ==
There are two major political coalitions in Kerala. The United Democratic Front (UDF) is the coalition of centrist and center-left parties led by the Indian National Congress. The Left Democratic Front (LDF) is the coalition of left-wing and far-left parties, led by the Communist Party of India (Marxist) (CPI(M)).

=== Left Democratic Front (Kerala) ===
Left Democratic Front (Kerala)

They are a coalition of left-wing political parties in Kerala. It is one of the two major political coalitions in the state, the other being the UDF, both of which has been in power alternatively for the last two decades. After winning a majority of the seats in the Niyamasabha elections, they are currently in power. The coalition consists of CPI(M), CPI and a variety of other smaller parties. LDF fields four CPI(M) candidates, an NCP candidate and an independent to fight in the by-poll.

No.	Party	Flag	Symbol	Photo	Leader	Seats contested	Male	Female
1.	Communist Party of India (Marxist)				Kodiyeri Balakrishnan	Manjeshwaram Aroor, Konni, Vattiyoorkavu	4	0
2.	Nationalist Congress Party					Pala	1	0
3.	LDF Independent				A. Vijayaraghavan	Ernakulam	1	0

=== United Democratic Front (Kerala) ===
United Democratic Front (Kerala)

It is an alliance of central-wing political parties in the state, created by the prominent INC party leader K. Karunakaran in the 1970s. UDF fielded four INC candidates, an IUML candidate and an independent for the vacant constituencies.

No.	Party	Flag	Symbol	Photo	Leader	Seats contested	Male	Female
1.	Indian National Congress				Mullappally Ramachandran	Ernakulam, Aroor, Konni Vattiyoorkavu	3	1
2.	Indian Union Muslim League				Sayed Hyderali Shihab Thangal	Manjeshwar	1	0
3.	UDF Independent				Benny Behanan	Pala	1	0

=== National Democratic Alliance ===
National Democratic Alliance

It is a coalition of right-leaning political parties in India. NDA gave all the six seats for the BJP to contest.

No.	Party	Flag	Symbol	Photo	Leader	Seats contested	Male	Female
1.	Bharatiya Janata Party				P. S Sreedharan Pillai	Manjeshwar, Ernakulam, Pala, Aroor, Konni Vattiyoorkavu	6	0

== Constituency-wise Candidates ==
The LDF fielded four CPI(M) candidates, an NCP candidate and an independent to win the seats. UDF fielded four INC candidates, an IUML candidate and an independent. NDA fielded six BJP candidates.

No.	Constituency	Candidates					
No.	Constituency	LDF CPI(M) (4) NCP (1) Independent (1)		UDF INC (4) IUML (1) Independent (1)		NDA BJP (6)	
1	Manjeshwar	M. Shankara Rai	CPI(M)	M. C. Kamaruddin	IUML	Raveesh Thanthri Kuntar	BJP
2	Ernakulam	Manu Roy	Independent	T. J. Vinod	INC	C. G. Rajagopal	BJP
3	Pala	Mani C. Kappan	NCP	Jose Tom Pulikunnel	Independent	N. Hari	BJP
4	Aroor	Manu C. Pulikkal	CPI(M)	Shanimol Usman	INC	K. P. Prakash Babu	BJP
5	Konni	K. U. Jenish Kumar	CPI(M)	P. Mohanraj	INC	K. Surendran	BJP
6	Vattiyoorkavu	V. K. Prasanth	CPI(M)	K. Mohankumar	INC	S. Suresh	BJP

== Exit Polls ==
The Manorama News and the Mathrubhumi News published their exit poll predictions in the constituencies where the election was held on 21 October 2019. Asianet News had published their exit poll predictions for Pala, where the election was held earlier.

	Manorama - Karvy			Mathrubhumi- Geowide India			AZ Research - Asianet		
Constituencies									
Constituencies	LDF	UDF	NDA	LDF	UDF	NDA	LDF	UDF	NDA
Manjeshwar	31%	36%	31%	21%	40%	37%			
Ernakulam	30%	55%	12%	39%	44%	15%			
Pala							32%	48%	19%
Aroor	44%	43%	11%	44%	43%	11%			
Konni	46%	41%	12%	39%	41%	19%			
Vattiyoorkavu	36%	37%	26%	41%	37%	20%			

== Polling day ==
Polling took place on 23 September 2019 in Pala and on 21 October 2019 in the remaining five Niyamasabha constituencies.

Number	Constituency	Polling%
1	Manjeshwar	75.78
82	Ernakulam	57.90
93	Pala	70.97
102	Aroor	80.47
114	Konni	70.07
133	Vattiyoorkavu	62.66

== Results in a glance ==
The results at a glance are given below:

=== By alliance ===
Both the LDF and the UDF won three seats each. The NDA could not win any seats.

Alliance	Seats Contested	Seats Won	Seat Change	Vote %	Swing %
UDF	06	03	▼02	38.68	▼1.78
LDF	06	03	▲02	37.97	▲1.53
NDA	06	00	00	21.63	▼0.09
Total	06				

=== Party-wise ===
Each of the CPI(M) and the INC won in two seats. The remaining two seats were bagged by the NCP and the IUML respectively.

LDF	SEATS	UDF	SEATS	NDA	SEATS
CPI(M)	02	INC	02	BJP	00
NCP	01	IUML	01	BJP	00
LDF; Independent	00	UDF; Independent	00	BJP	00
Total	03	Total	03	Total	00
Change	▲02	Change	▼02	Change	00

=== By district ===
District	No. of constituencies	Winning party	Alliance
Kasaragod	01	IUML	UDF
Ernakulam	01	INC	UDF
Kottayam	01	NCP	LDF
Alappuzha	01	INC	UDF
Pathanamthitta	01	CPI(M)	LDF
Thiruvananthapuram	01	CPI(M)	LDF
Total	06		

=== By constituency ===
No.	Constituency	LDF candidate	Party	Votes		UDF candidate	Party	Votes		NDA candidate	Party	Votes		Winner	Margin		Alliance
1	Manjeshwar	M. Shankara Rai	CPI(M)	38,233	23.49%	M. C. Kamaruddin	IUML	65,407	40.19%	Raveesh Thanthri Kuntar	BJP	57,484	35.32%	M. C. Kamaruddin	7,923	4.87%	UDF
82	Ernakulam	Manu Roy	LDF	34,141	37.96%	T. J. Vinod	INC	37,891	42.13%	C. G. Rajagopal	BJP	13,351	14.85%	T. J. Vinod	3,750	4.17%	UDF
93	Pala	Mani C. Kappan	NCP	54,137	42.55%	Jose Tom Pulikunnel	UDF	51,194	40.24%	N. Hari	BJP	18,044	14.18%	Mani C. Kappan	2,943	2.31%	LDF
102	Aroor	Manu C. Pulikkal	CPI(M)	67,277	43.54%	Shanimol Usman	INC	69,356	44.88%	K. P. Prakash Babu	BJP	16,289	10.54%	Shanimol Usman	2,079	1.34%	UDF
114	Konni	K. U. Jenish Kumar	CPI(M)	54,099	38.96%	P. Mohanraj	INC	44,140	31.79%	K. Surendran	BJP	39,786	28.65%	K. U. Jenish Kumar	9,953	7.17%	LDF
133	Vattiyoorkavu	V. K. Prasanth	CPI(M)	54,830	44.25%	K. Mohan Kumar	INC	40,365	32.58%	S. Suresh	BJP	27,453	22.16%	V. K. Prasanth	14,465	11.67%	LDF

== Detailed results ==
=== 1. Manjeshwar ===
2019 Kerala Legislative Assembly by-elections : Manjeshwar
Party	Candidate	Votes	%	±%
IUML	M. C. Kamaruddin	65,407	40.19%	▲4.40
BJP	Raveesh Thanthri Kuntar	57,484	35.32%	▼0.42
CPI(M)	M. Shankara Rai	38,233	23.49%	▼3.30
NOTA	None of the Above	574	0.35%	▼0.06
Independent	Govindan B. Alinthazhe	337	0.21%	N/A
Independent	John D. Souza	277	0.17%	▲0.04
Independent	Rajesh B.	232	0.14%	N/A
Independent	Kamarudheen M. C.	211	0.13%	N/A
Margin of victory		7,923	4.87%	▲4.82
Turnout		162,755	75.78%	▼0.55
IUML hold		Swing	▲4.40	

=== 82. Ernakulam ===
2019 Kerala Legislative Assembly by-elections : Ernakulam
Party	Candidate	Votes	%	±%
INC	T. J. Vinod	37,891	42.13%	▼10.19
LDF	Manu Roy	34,141	37.96%	▲5.50
BJP	C. G. Rajagopal	13,351	14.85%	▲1.39
Independent	Manu K. M.	2,572	2.86%	N/A
NOTA	None of the Above	1,309	1.46%	▲0.61
Independent	Vinod A. P.	206	0.23%	N/A
SFB	Abdul Khader	175	0.19%	N/A
Independent	Jaisen Thomas	116	0.13%	N/A
Independent	Bosco Louis	93	0.10%	N/A
Independent	Ashokan	78	0.09%	N/A
Margin of victory		3,750	4.17%	▼15.69
Turnout		89,932	57.91%	▼13.81
INC hold		Swing	▼10.19	

=== 93. Pala ===
2019 Kerala Legislative Assembly by-elections : Pala
Party	Candidate	Votes	%	±%
NCP	Mani C. Kappan	54,137	42.55%	
UDF	Jose Tom Pulikkunnel	51,194	40.24%	
BJP	N. Hari	18,044	14.18%	
Independent	C. J. Philip	1,085	0.85%	
Independent	Maju Puthenkandam	1,012	0.80%	
NOTA	None of the Above	742	0.58%	
Independent	George Pooveli	565	0.44%	
Independent	Tom Thomas	303	0.24%	
Independent	Ignatious Illimoottil	233	0.18%	
Independent	Joseph Jacob	178	0.14%	
Independent	Babu Joseph	130	0.10%	
Independent	Joemon Joseph Srampickal	130	0.10%	
Independent	Joby Thomas	112	0.09%	
Independent	Sunilkumar	97	0.08%	
Margin of victory		2,943	2.31%	
Turnout		127,220	70.97%	
NCP gain from KC(M)		Swing		

=== 102. Aroor ===
2019 Kerala Legislative Assembly by-elections : Aroor
Party	Candidate	Votes	%	±%
INC	Shanimol Usman	69,356	44.88%	▲16.34
CPI(M)	Manu C. Pulikkal	67,277	43.54%	▼8.80
BJP	K. P. Prakash Babu	16,289	10.54%	N/A
NOTA	None of the Above	840	0.54%	▲0.09
Independent	Geetha Asokan	352	0.23%	N/A
Independent	K. B. Sunil Kumar	278	0.18%	N/A
Independent	Alleppy Sugunan	142	0.09%	N/A
Margin of victory		2,079	1.34%	▼22.46
Turnout		154,534	80.47%	▼5.36
INC gain from CPI(M)		Swing	▲16.34	

=== 114. Konni ===
2019 Kerala Legislative Assembly by-elections : Konni
Party	Candidate	Votes	%	±%
CPI(M)	K. U. Jenish Kumar	54,099	38.96%	▲2.63
INC	P. Mohanraj	44,146	31.79%	▼19.02
BJP	K. Surendran	39,786	28.65%	▲16.99
NOTA	None of the Above	469	0.34%	▲0.01
Independent	Joemon Joseph Srampickal	235	0.17%	N/A
Independent	Sivanandan	124	0.09%	N/A
Margin of victory		9,953	7.17%	▼7.31
Turnout		138,859	70.07%	▼2.92
CPI(M) gain from INC		Swing	▲2.63	

=== 133. Vattiyoorkavu ===
2019 Kerala Legislative Assembly by-elections: Vattiyoorkavu
Party	Candidate	Votes	%	±%
CPI(M)	V. K. Prasanth	54,830	44.25%	▲14.46
INC	K. Mohankumar	40,365	32.58%	▼5.23
BJP	S. Suresh	27,453	22.16%	▼10.03
NOTA	None of the Above	820	0.66%	▲0.06
Independent	A.Mohanakumar	135	0.11%	N/A
Independent	Nagaraj G.	100	0.08%	N/A
Independent	Suresh S. S.	93	0.08%	N/A
Independent	Murukan A.	76	0.06%	N/A
Independent	Mithran G.	38	0.03%	N/A
Majority		14,465	11.67%	▲6.06
Turnout		123,910	62.66%	▼7.17
CPI(M) gain from INC		Swing	▲14.46	

=== List of the newly elected MLAs to the 14th Kerala Niyamasabha ===
As a result of the 2019 Kerala Legislative Assembly by-elections, six new members were elected to the Kerala Niyamasabha.

Constituency	Member	Party	Alliance
Manjeshwar	M. C. Kamaruddin	IUML	UDF
Ernakulam	T. J. Vinod	INC	UDF
Pala	Mani C. Kappan	NCP	LDF
Aroor	Shanimol Usman	INC	UDF
Konni	K. U. Jenish Kumar	CPI(M)	LDF
Vattiyoorkavu	V. K. Prasanth	CPI(M)	LDF

=== Assembly seat share post by-elections ===
After the 2019 Kerala Legislative Assembly by-elections, the composition of 14th Kerala Legislative Assembly changed as per given below:

UDF	LDF	NDA
45	93	2

The Kerala Niyamasabha is composed of 141 seats (140 elected and 1 nominated). After the by-elections, the Government of Kerala has the support of 93 members.

Total (141)

Government (93)

- LDF (93)
  - CPI(M) (60)
  - CPI (19)
  - JD(S) (3)
  - NCP (3)
  - C(S) (1)
  - KC(B) (1)
  - NSC (1)
  - IND (5)

Opposition (47)

- UDF (45)
  - INC (21)
  - IUML (18)
  - KC(M) (5)
  - KC(J) (1)
- NDA (2)
  - BJP (1)
  - KJ(S) (1)
- Others(1)
  - Nominated (1)

== See also ==
- 2016 Kerala Legislative Assembly election
- Kerala Legislative Assembly
- 2019 Indian general election in Kerala
- 2019 elections in India
