= K. Muraleedharan =

Minister for Health and Family Welfare & Devaswom, Government of Kerala

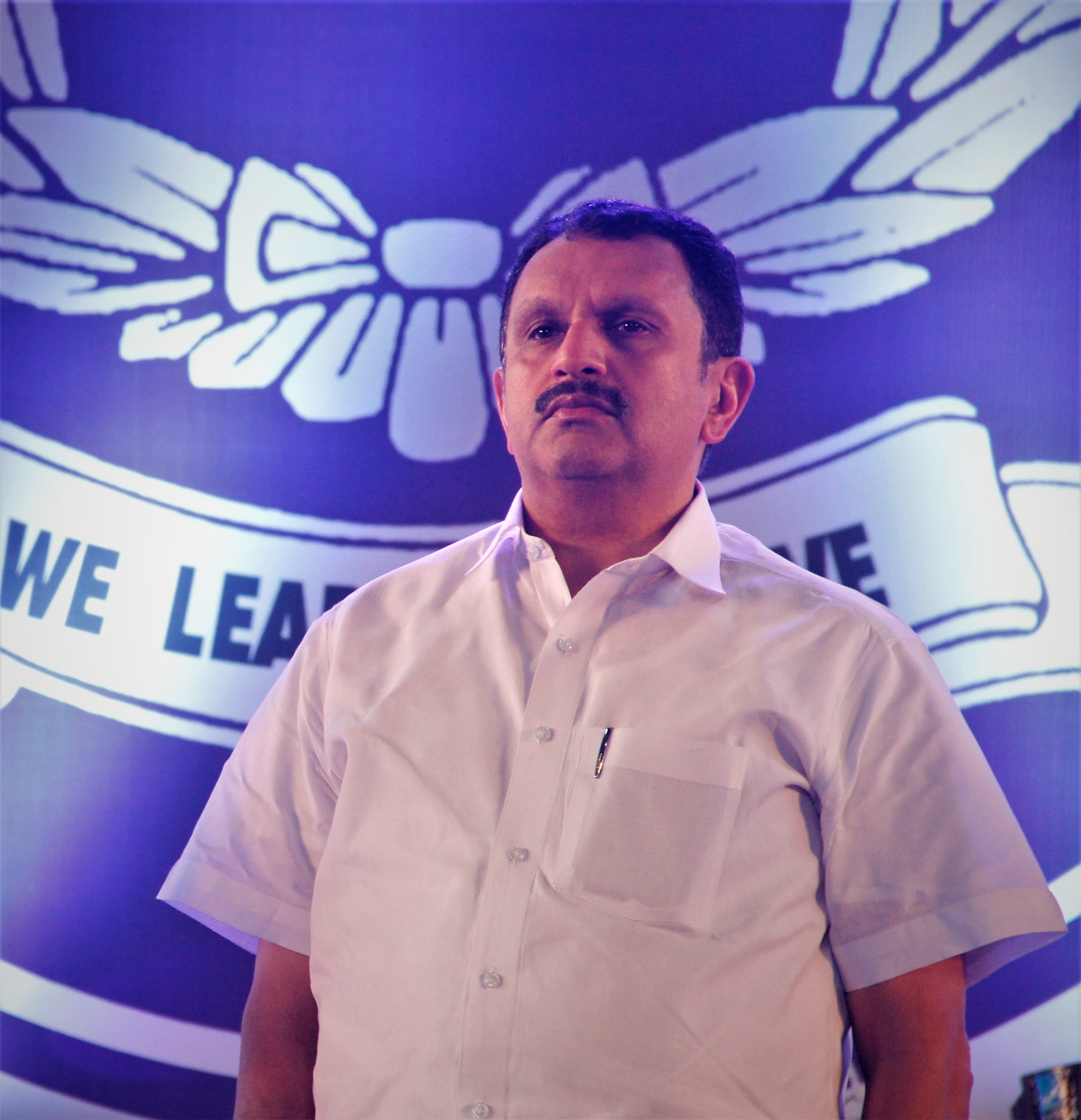

Minister for Health, Family Welfare & Devaswom, Government of Kerala
- Incumbent
- Assumed office 18 May 2026
- Chief Minister: V. D. Satheesan
- Portfolio(s): See list: Health; AYUSH; Medical Education; Family Welfare; Drugs Control; Food Safety; Medical University; Indigenous Medicine; Devaswom
- Preceded by: Veena George (Health and Family Welfare); V. N. Vasavan (Devaswom)

Minister for Electricity, Government of Kerala
- In office 11 February 2004 – 14 May 2004
- Chief Minister: A. K. Antony
- Preceded by: Kadavoor Sivadasan
- Succeeded by: Kadavoor Sivadasan

Chairman, KPCC Election Campaign Committee
- Incumbent
- Assumed office 5 June 2024
- Preceded by: Ramesh Chennithala
- In office 2018 – 2024
- Succeeded by: Ramesh Chennithala

President, Kerala Pradesh Congress Committee
- In office 2001 – 2004
- Preceded by: Thennala Balakrishna Pillai
- Succeeded by: P. P. Thankachan

Member of Parliament, Lok Sabha
- In office 23 May 2019 – 4 June 2024
- Preceded by: Mullappally Ramachandran
- Succeeded by: Shafi Parambil
- Constituency: Vatakara
- In office 6 October 1999 – 16 May 2004
- Preceded by: P. Sankaran
- Succeeded by: M. P. Veerendra Kumar
- Constituency: Kozhikode
- In office 29 November 1989 – 12 May 1996
- Preceded by: K. G. Adiyodi
- Succeeded by: M. P. Veerendra Kumar
- Constituency: Kozhikode

Member of the Kerala Legislative Assembly
- Incumbent
- Assumed office 4 May 2026
- Preceded by: V. K. Prasanth
- Constituency: Vattiyoorkavu
- In office 13 May 2011 – 23 May 2019
- Preceded by: M. Vijayakumar
- Succeeded by: V. K. Prasanth
- Constituency: Vattiyoorkavu

Personal details
- Born: 14 May 1957 (age 69) Thrissur, Kerala, India
- Party: Indian National Congress (1980–2004) (2011–Present)
- Other political affiliations: Democratic Indira Congress (Karunakaran) (2004–2005); Nationalist Congress Party (2005–2011)
- Spouse: Jyothi Muraleedharan
- Relations: Padmaja Venugopal
- Children: 2
- Parents: K. Karunakaran; Kalyanikutty Amma
- Education: Mar Ivanios College, Thiruvananthapuram (Bachelor of Arts); The Kerala Law Academy Law College, Thiruvananthapuram (Bachelor of Laws)
- Occupation: Politician; Lawyer; Social worker

Kannoth Muraleedharan (born 14 May 1957) is an Indian politician and lawyer serving as the Minister for Health, Family Welfare and Devaswoms of Kerala. He represents Vattiyoorkavu in the Kerala Legislative Assembly. He is the son of veteran Congress leader K. Karunakaran, who served as Chief Minister of Kerala and as Union Minister for Industry.

== Early life ==
Muraleedharan was born on 14 May 1957 to K. Karunakaran, the former Chief Minister of Kerala, and Kalyanikutty Amma in Thrissur, Kerala. His younger sister, Padmaja Venugopal, is also a politician. Their family hails from Chirakkal, Kannur.

Muraleedharan studied at St. Joseph's Higher Secondary School, Thiruvananthapuram. After pursuing a BA degree from Mar Ivanios College, Thiruvananthapuram, he qualified in LLB from The Kerala Law Academy Law College, Thiruvananthapuram.

Muraleedharan is married to Jyothi. They have two sons, Arun Narayanan and Sabari Nath.

== Political career ==
Muraleedharan started his political career within the Congress party as a Seva Dal worker. Thereafter, he held the posts of District chairman and State Chief of Kerala Seva Dal. He was elected as Member of Parliament from the Calicut (Kozhikode) constituency in the General Elections of 1989 by defeating veteran CPI(M) leader EK Imbichi Bava and winning re-election in 1991 by defeating Janata Dal leader MP Veerendra Kumar. In the 1996 Indian General Election, he lost his seat to M. P. Veerendra Kumar and subsequently failed in Thrissur Loksabha seat in his comeback attempt in the 1998 election, before regaining Kozhikode seat by defeating Janata Dal national leader and former Union Minister CM Ibrahim in 1999. Thereafter, he held the roles of General secretary, Vice-President of KPCC and became the President of KPCC during 2001–2004.

In February 2004, Muraleedharan was appointed Minister of Power in the AK Antony Ministry, though he was not a member of the Kerala Legislative Assembly. He was required to win a seat within six months to continue as the minister but lost in by-election from Wadakkancherry. Subsequently, he resigned in May that year. He is the only state Minister who was never MLA and never faced the legislative assembly.

In 2005, when the Karunakaran faction of the INC party had differences with the party leadership and the UDF, some members of the party quit and formed another party named DIC(K). They allied with the LDF for the local panchayat elections of 2005 and had some success.

However, for the Kerala Assembly elections of 2006, DIC(K) made a pact with UDF as LDF declined to make any electoral arrangements with DIC(K). DIC(K) contested in 17 constituencies but managed to get elected only from one seat mostly because of grassroots level cross-voting by Congress. Muralidharan lost the election in Koduvally constituency to P.T.A. Rahim.

With the future of the DIC(K) party untenable, some party members of the DIC(K) returned to the Congress party whilst others, including Karunakaran and Muraleedharan, decided instead to join the NCP.

Later, Karunakaran rejoined the Congress party, while his son Muraleedharan opted to stay with the NCP, decrying his father's "betrayal". Muraleedharan contested the 2009 Lok Sabha polls from the Wayanad constituency under the NCP ticket, but came only in third place, behind the Congress party and the CPI.

In August 2009, he was expelled from the NCP and sacked as state chief of the party, as he openly expressed his desire to rejoin the Congress party. He was subsequently refused re-entry into the Congress party, the party leadership stating that the disparaging comments he had made about the party leadership whilst in opposition were too big a barrier to his re-joining. Muraleedharan pledged that he would "wait for any length of time" for the party to change its mind and readmit him, while his father Karunakaran stated that he would take up the matter with the national leadership of the Congress party, if necessary. He was readmitted to the Congress party in February 2011, after his father died, and was given a ticket to contest the Assembly election from the Vattiyurkavu Assembly constituency (former Thiruvananthapuram North Constituency). Subsequently, he won his first assembly election after he defeated ruling Communist Party of India-Marxist (CPI-M) supported independent candidate Cherian Philip by a margin of over 16,167 votes on 14 May 2011. He was re-elected for the second time in 2016 defeating Kummanam Rajasekharan of BJP by a margin of 7622 votes.

In Indian general election 2019 he has been elected from Vatakara with a tremendous margin by defeating P Jayarajan of CPI(M) by a margin of 84663 votes.

In Indian general election 2024 he was a candidate of Indian National Congress party from Thrissur Constituency.

In the 2026 Kerala Legislative Assembly election, he contested from Vattiyoorkavu Assembly Constituency and won by defeating the sitting MLA V K Prasanth. Later he assumed office as the Minister of Health and Devaswom in Government of Kerala.

Election candidature history
| Election | Year | Party | Constituency | Opponent | | Result | Margin |
|---|---|---|---|---|---|---|---|
| Loksabha | 1989 | INC | Kozhikode | CPI(M) | E. K. Imbichi Bava | Won | 28,957 |
| Loksabha | 1991 | INC | Kozhikode | JD(S) | M.P. Veerendra Kumar | Won | 15,884 |
| Loksabha | 1996 | INC | Kozhikode | JD(S) | M.P. Veerendra Kumar | Lost | 38,703 |
| Loksabha | 1998 | INC | Thrissur | CPI | V. V. Raghavan | Lost | 18,409 |
| Loksabha | 1999 | INC | Kozhikode | JD(S) | C. M. Ibrahim | Won | 50,402 |
| Loksabha | 2009 | NCP | Wayanad | INC | M. I. Shanavas | Lost | 311,040 |
| Loksabha | 2019 | INC | Vatakara | CPI(M) | P. Jayarajan | Won | 84,663 |
| Loksabha | 2024 | INC | Thrissur | BJP | Suresh Gopi | Lost | 84,214 |
| Kerala Legislative Assembly | 2004 (By-election) | INC | Wadakkanchery | CPI(M) | A. C. Moideen | Lost | 3,715 |
| Kerala Legislative Assembly | 2006 | DIC | Koduvally | CPI(M) | P. T. A. Rahim | Lost | 7,506 |
| Kerala Legislative Assembly | 2011 | INC | Vattiyoorkavu | Independent | Cheriyan Phillip | Won | 16,167 |
| Kerala Legislative Assembly | 2016 | INC | Vattiyoorkavu | BJP | Kummanam Rajasekharan | Won | 7,622 |
| Kerala Legislative Assembly | 2021 | INC | Nemom | CPI(M) | V. Sivankutty | Lost | 19,313 |
| Kerala Legislative Assembly | 2026 | INC | Vattiyoorkavu | CPI(M) | V.K. Prasanth | Won | 5,425 |

=== Positions held ===
- 1989 – MP Kozhikode– by defeating CPIM leader E. K. Imbichi Bava
- 1991 – MP Kozhikode– by defeating JDS leader M.P. Veerendra Kumar
- 1999 – MP Kozhikode– by defeating JDS leader M.P. Veerendra Kumar
- 2011 – MLA Vattiyoorkavu– by defeating Cherian Philip
- 2016 – MLA Vattiyoorkavu– by defeating BJP leader Kummanam Rajasekharan
- 2019 – MP from Vatakara – by defeating CPIM leader P. Jayarajan
- 2026 – MLA Vattiyoorkavu – by defeating CPIM leader V.K. Prasanth
- Minister of Health and Devaswom in the VD Satheesan ministry - 2026 May onwards - present
