= Kuttimannilbethel =

- village
- Location in Kerala, India Kuttimannilbethel (India)
- Coordinates: 9°8′0″N 76°51′0″E
- Country: India
- State: Kerala
- District: Pathanamthitta

Languages
  - Official: Malayalam, English
- Time zone: UTC+5:30 (IST)
- Vehicle registration: KL-
- Coastline: 0 kilometres (0 mi)
- Climate: Tropical monsoon (Köppen)
- Avg. summer temperature: 35 °C (95 °F)
- Avg. winter temperature: 20 °C (68 °F)

Kuttimannilbethel is a village located near Kalanjoor in Pathanamthitta district, Kerala, India.

== Language ==
Malayalam is the native language of Kuttimannilbethel.

== Politics ==
Kuttimannilbethel is a part of Pathanamthitta Loksabha constituency. Mr. Anto Antony is the current Member of Parliament of the constituency.
