= Death of Ariyil Shukoor =

Indian student activist (1988–2012)

Ariyil Abdul Shukoor
- Born: 9 February 1988; Ariyil ,Taliparamba , Kannur, Kerala, India
- Died: 20 February 2012 (aged 24); Kannapuram, Kannur, Kerala, India
- Cause of death: Assassination
- Organization: Muslim Students Federation (Kerala unit)

Ariyil Shukoor (February 9, 1988 – February 20, 2012) was a student activist stabbed to death in Kannapuram, Kannur, Kerala, India, on 20 February 2012. He was a student activist of Muslim Students Federation (Kerala unit) and a worker in the Indian Union Muslim League. In Ariyil, Shukkoor and his Muslim League associates was attacked by CPM workers. .

== Death ==
Shukoor murder case on February 20, 2012, near Valluvan in Kannapuram Kannur, Kerala, India. CPIM Kannur district secretary P. Jayarajan came to Pattuvam in connection with the conflict between the Muslim League and CPIM in the area of Pattuvam. Abdul Shukoor was killed in retaliation for the attack on the vehicle in which P. Jayarajan and Kalliasseri MLA T. V. Rajesh were traveling The case received much public attention as an allegation of brutal murder in February 2012

== Investigation and arrests ==
In February 2019, the Central Bureau of Investigation (CBI), probed the murder of worker in 2012, submitted a charge sheet and charging CPM district secretary P. Jayarajan and CPM MLA T. V. Rajesh with conspiracy to commit the murder. Seven persons were accused of directly participating in the crime.

== Case history ==
=== February to October 2012 ===
- 20 February 2012 - Abdul Shukur is killed. Zakaria, who was with him, is seriously injured.
- March 22 . Ernakulam District Secretary M.V. The first charge sheet of 18 persons, including Govindan's son Shyamjith and Bijumon, son of Thaliparam Municipal Council former chairman and area committee member Vadi Ravi, has been submitted to the court.
- March 29 - CPM workers, including Vadi Ravi's son Bijumon, surrendered in the Kannur Judicial First Class Court.
- May 25 - The 10th accused in the case, Ajith Kumar, was granted bail by the High Court.
- May 26 - Arrested Local Secretary U.V.Venu at Ari, who was a key accomplice in the conspiracy.
- May 27 - DYFI Pappinissery Block Secretary Ganesan Morazha and Muthuani Unit Secretary Ajesh were arrested.
- June 2 - CPM Kannapuram Town Branch Secretary K.V. used the knife used to kill Shukur. Recovered from the tool box of Sajith's bike.
- June 8 - The weapon with which Zakaria was hacked was recovered from the bushes at Chera near Keezhara.
- June 9 - Notice to P. Jayarajan and T.V. Rajesh to appear for questioning.
- June 12 - P. Jayarajan was questioned at the guest house. The investigation team has received critical information
- June 14 - Thaliparam area secretary P. Vasudevan and Thaliparam municipal council vice chairman K. Muralidharan were questioned.
- June 18 - CPM district committee member and president of Thaliparamb Cooperative Hospital K. Balakrishnan gave a statement from the investigation team.
- June 22 - The charge sheet was extended to include 34 people in the case.
- July 5 - DYFI district committee member and CPM Moraza local committee member AV Babu arrested.
- July 9 - P. Jayarajan was interrogated for the second time at the Kannur guest house.
- July 29 - TV Rajesh questioned the MLA.
- August 1 - CPM Kannur District Secretary P. Jayarajan was arrested. Widespread violence protesting the arrest.
- August 7 - P. Jayarajan's bail application and T.V. The High Court also rejected the anticipatory bail plea filed by Rajesh MLA. TV Rajesh MLA surrendered in Kannur court.
- August 27 - P. on condition of personal surety of Rs.25,000 and two sureties of equal amount. High Court granted bail to Jayarajan.
- October 7 – The 20th accused Achali Sarish of Kummanangatte in Moraza Central North suicide himself in the bathroom of a private hospital in Kannur

=== 2013 to 2019 ===
- 13 April 2013 - Muslim League decided to expel two people who forced them to change their testimonies
- 27 June 2016 - The Kerala High Court ordered the CBI to stop the investigation in to the shukoor case

=== February to October 2019 ===
- February 11, 2019 The CBI filed a charge sheet in Thalassery court accusing Jayarajan and TV Rajesh of murder.
- February 19 - Thalassery Sessions Court returns charge sheet against P Jayarajan and TV Rajesh

=== 2019 to 2023 ===
- October 17 - The Kerala High Court quashed the defamation case filed against Muslim League leader and former MLA K. M. Shaji on the complaint of CPIM leader P. Jayarajan

== See also ==
- Murder of Abhimanyu M.
- T. P. Chandrasekharan
- P. Jayarajan
