= Kalanjoor =

- Village
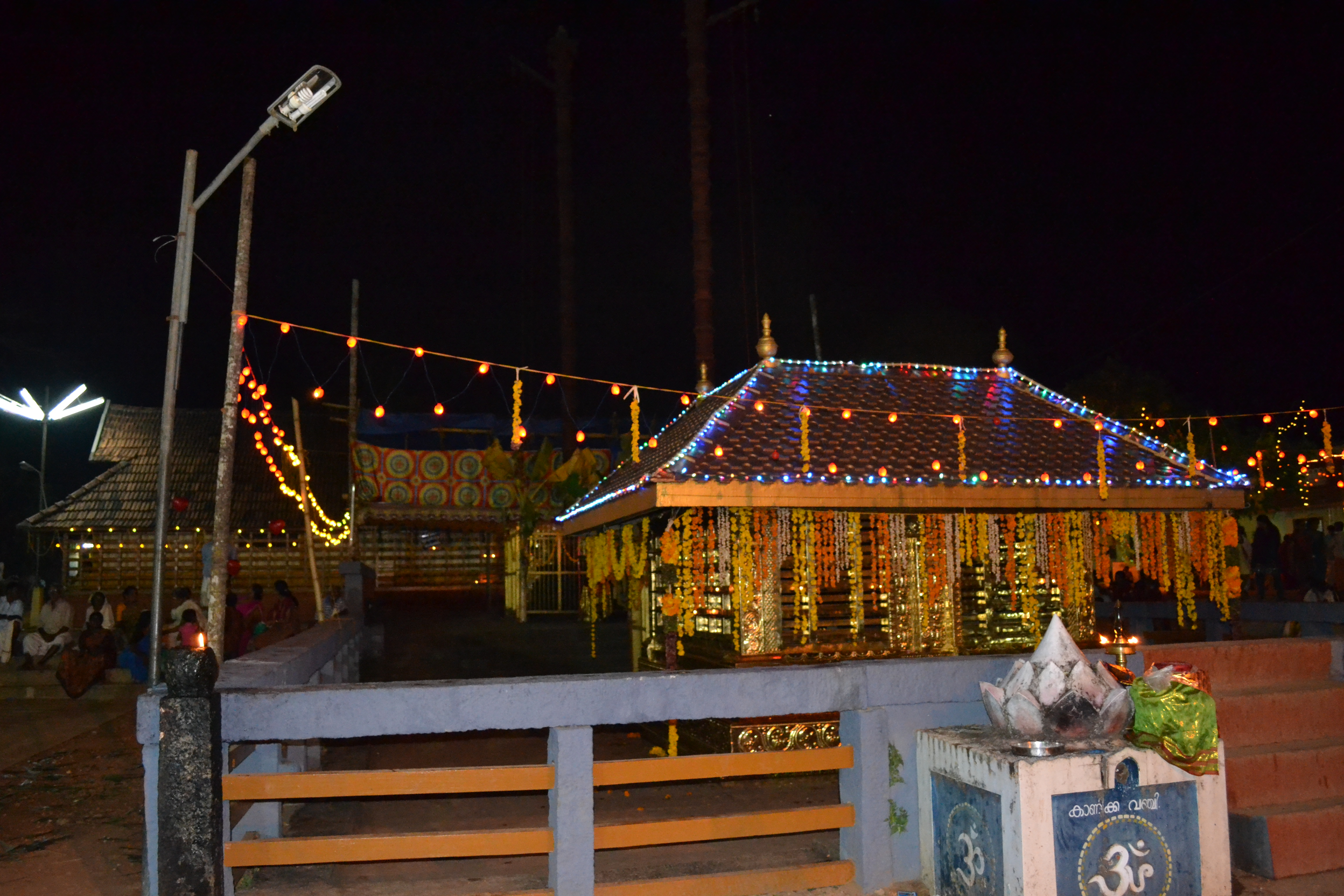
- Thrikkalanjoor Sree Mahadeva Temple

- Location in Kerala, India Kalanjoor (India)
- Coordinates: 9°7′0″N 76°51′0″E
- Country: India
- State: Kerala
- District: Pathanamthitta

Government
  - Type: Panchayati raj (India)
  - Body: Kalanjoor Grama Panchayat

Area
  - Total: 32.96 km^{2} (12.73 sq mi)

Population (2011)
  - Total: 16,075
  - Density: 487.7/km^{2} (1,263/sq mi)

Languages
  - Official: Malayalam, English
- Time zone: UTC+5:30 (IST)
- PIN: 689694
- Telephone code: 04734
- Vehicle registration: KL-83 (Konni)
- Lok Sabha constituency: Pathanamthitta
- Vidhan Sabha constituency: Konni

Kalanjoor is a village located in Pathanamthitta district state of Kerala, India. The place is 22 km away from district headquarters. As a part of Konni Assembly constituency and Pathanamthitta Lok Sabha constituency. Kalanjoor is also a panchayath where share the border of Kollam and Pathanamthitta district as the part of Parakode Block Panchayat.

The place has a mixed population of Hindus, Christians (predominantly Syrian Christians) and Muslims. The famous Hindu temple Thrikkalanjoor Sree Mahadeva Temple situated in Kalanjoor Town close to Punalur Muvattupuzha Main Eastern Highway (SH 08). This is one of the biggest Shiva Temple in Pathanamthitta district and the first Sabarimala edathavalam on the way of Sabarimala from the Southern part of Pathanamthitta district. So that this place is also known as the "Southern Gateway of Sabarimala". One of the famous Christian Orthodox church St. George Valyapalli of the Malankara Orthodox Church also situated in the same village and one of the India's largest aqueducts is also passing through Kalanjoor as part of Kallada Irrigation Project (KIP). Many of the inhabitants of this village are settlers there due to the introduction of rubber plantations. A number of people from Kalanjoor are employed in abroad, mainly in the Middle East.

College of Applied Science, Kalanjoor is affiliated to the University of Kerala and is established in 2014 with regular courses of Bachelor of Commerce with Computer Applications and Bachelor of Business Administration.

== Demographics ==
As of 2011 India census, Kalanjoor had a population of 16075 with 7516 males and 8559 females.

== Educational Institutions ==
College

- College of Applied Sciences (I.H.R.D), Kalanjoor

Schools

- GVHSS Koodal & GHSS Kalanjoor
- Govt. LP School Kalanjoor
- Vyasa Vidya Peethom Kalanjoor

== Places To Visit ==
Saint George Orthodox Valiyapally

Kalanjoor is home to Saint George Valiyapally, part of the Adoor-Kadampanad Diocese of the Indian Orthodox Church. The church was inaugurated by St. Gregorios of Parumala and is the oldest church in the village.

Thrikalanjoor Mahadeva Temple

This one of the famous Hindu Shiva Temple in Kerala situated in Kalanjoor.

Kudappara, Kalanjoor

Kudappara is a small Hindu Temple situated on the top of small hill. This place is historical as well as good for sightseeing during morning and evening. Place is located in Kalanjoor - Padom road, 800m from Kalanajoor Jn

Kochu Kuttalam Waterfalls

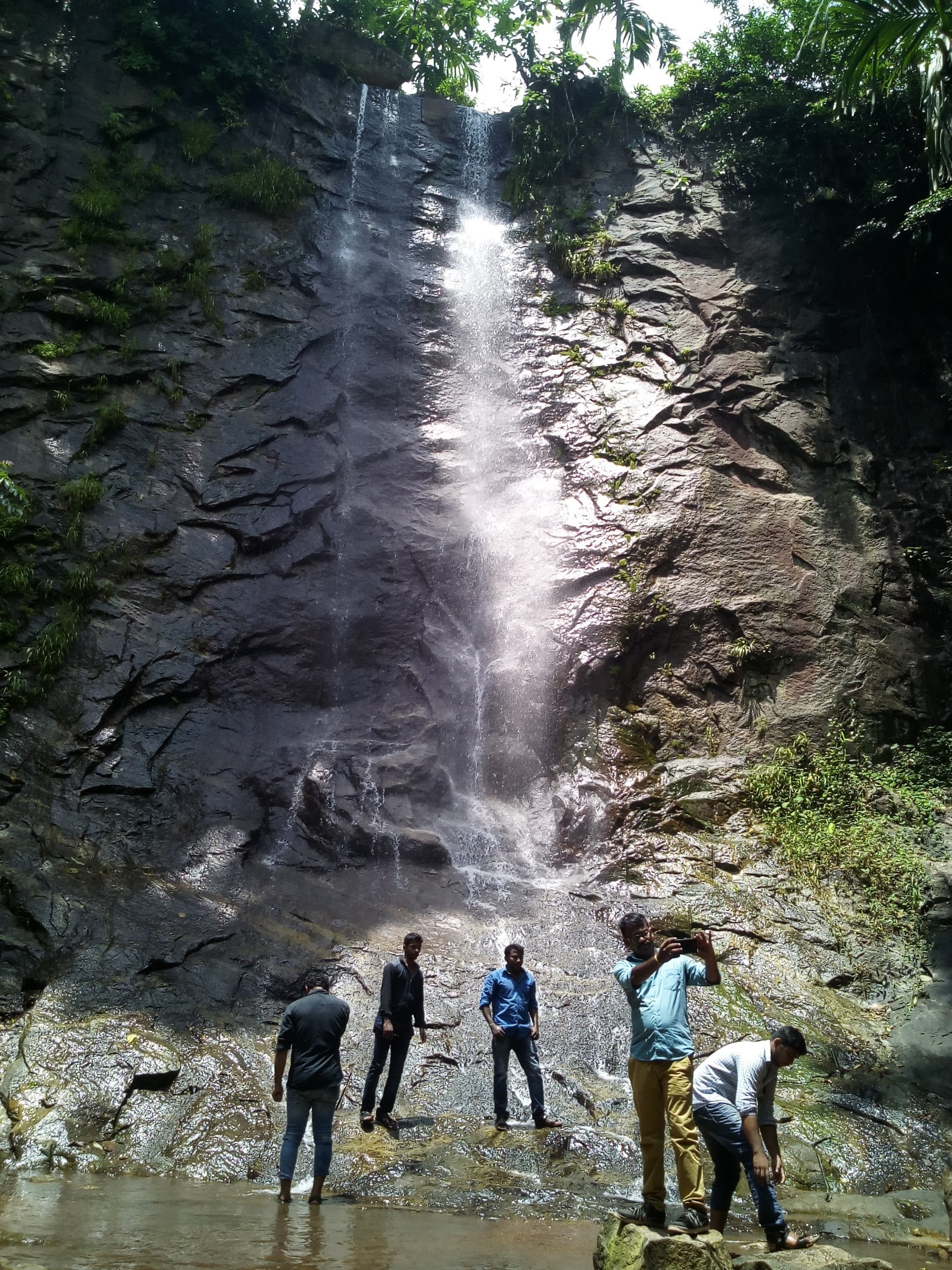
Kochu Kuttalam (Non Seasonal Time)

This small seasonal waterfall, is located in Vazhapara, Kalanjoor - Padom road 2 km from Kalanjoor jn

== See also ==
- Kuttimannilbethel
