= P. Jayarajan =

CPM State Committee Member

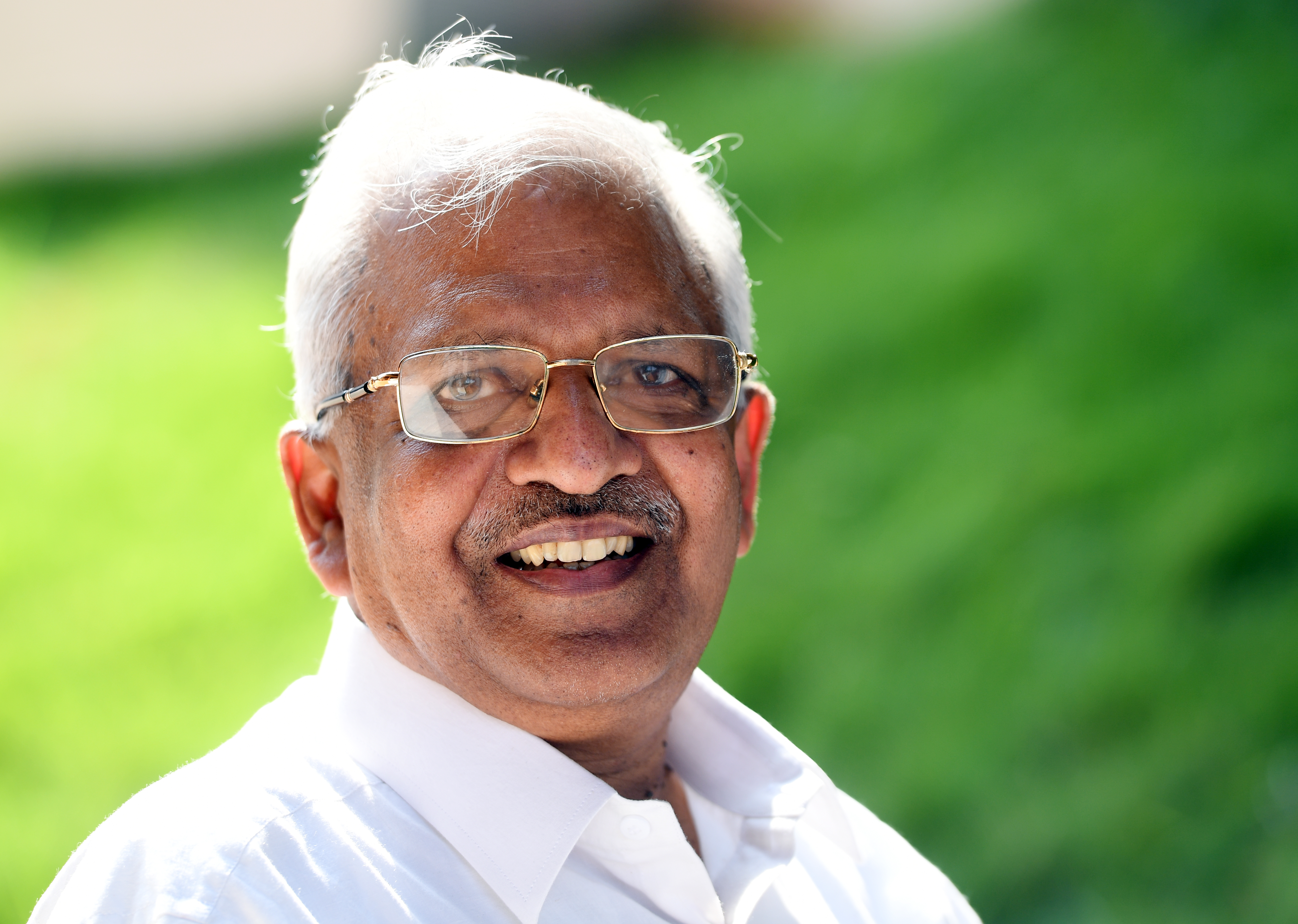

Vice Chairman of Kerala State Khadi and Village Industries Board
- Incumbent
- Assumed office 12 November 2021
- Preceded by: Shobhana George

Secretary, CPI(M) Kannur District Committee
- In office 13 December 2010 – 11 March 2019
- Succeeded by: M. V. Jayarajan

Member of Kerala Legislative Assembly
- In office 2001–2011
- Preceded by: K. K. Shailaja
- Succeeded by: K. P. Mohanan
- Constituency: Kuthuparamba

Personal details
- Born: 27 November 1952 (age 73) Kadirur, Kannur, Madras State, India
- Party: Communist Party of India (Marxist)
- Spouse: Yamuna T. P.
- Children: 2
- Parent(s): Kunhiraman; Deviamma
- Relatives: P. Sathidevi (sister)

P. Jayarajan (born 27 November 1952) is a member of the CPI(M) Kerala state secretariat and former member of the Kerala Legislative Assembly who represented Koothuparamba constituency from 2001 to 2011. He served as the secretary of CPI(M) Kannur District Committee from 2010 until he was replaced by M.V. Jayarajan in March 2019. In March 2019 he was named the LDF candidate from Vatakara for the 2019 Indian General Elections.

== Personal life ==
P. Jayarajan was born on 27 November 1952 to Kunhiraman and Deviamma at Kadirur. Jayarajan's wife Yamuna is the secretary of Kuthuparamba Cooperative Rural Bank, and they have two sons. He is the brother of P. Sathidevi, CPI(M) state committee member and former MP from Vadakara. She is serving as the chairperson of Kerala Women's Commission since 1 October 2021.

== Political career ==
Jayarajan's entry to politics was through the students’ movement. He served as the district secretary and president of the SFI. He became a member of the CPI(M) in 1972, and went on to serve as its Koothuparamba area secretary for 10 years. He was then elected to the CPI(M) Kannur district secretariat, and later, in 1998, to the state committee. In CPI(M) extended state committee in 2026 he elected to the state secretariat.

He was appointed the secretary of the CPI(M) Kannur district committee in December 2010 and was re-elected subsequently in 2012 and 2015. He went on to hold the position until March 2019, when, after being named the LDF candidate from Vatakara for the 2019 Indian General Elections, he was replaced by M.V. Jayarajan.

=== Electoral career ===
P. Jayarajan was first elected to the Eleventh Kerala Legislative Assembly from Koothuparamba constituency in 2001. His election was declared void by the SCI on 11 January 2005. Later, in the by-election held on 5 June 2005, he was re-elected to the Legislative Assembly. He continued to win the seat in 2006, when fresh elections were held to Twelfth Kerala Legislative Assembly.

Kerala Legislative Assembly Election
| Year | Constituency | Closest Rival | Majority (Votes) | Won/Lost |
|---|---|---|---|---|
| 2001 | Kuthuparamba | K.Prabhakaran (INC) | 18620 | Won |
| 2005 By- Election | Kuthuparamba | K.Prabhakaran (INC) | 45377 | Won |
| 2006 | Kuthuparamba | Adv.Sajeev Joseph (INC) | 38327 | Won |

Parliamentary Election
| Year | Constituency | Closest Rival | Majority (Votes) | Won/ Lost |
|---|---|---|---|---|
| 2019 | Vadakara | K. Muraleedharan (INC) | 85364 | Lost |

==== 2019 Lok Sabha Elections ====
P. Jayarajan was named the LDF candidate for Vatakara constituency for the 2019 Lok Sabha elections by the CPI(M). He lost to K. Muraleedharan by a margin of 84,663 votes. His sister and CPI(M) leader P. Sathidevi had represented the constituency from 2004 to 2009.

=== Trade Union Leadership ===
Jayarajan was formerly the president of the CITU Kannur district committee. He has also rendered service as the president of Rubco Employees Union, the president of Aralam Farm Workers Union & as president of Kuthuparamba Area Head Load Workers Union.

=== Attempt on life ===
Jayarajan was attacked by RSS on 25 August 1999 at his house at Kathiroor owing to political animosity. He was severely injured as one of his arms was nearly chopped off and the other lost a thumb.

Six of the nine accused were found guilty later in 2007.

== Philanthropy ==
Jayarajan is the chairman of Initiative for Rehabilitation and Palliative Care (IRPC) that was founded with the aim of provided palliative care. It has subsequently expanded its spheres of influence with activities like kanivu, which provides training and jobs to the differently abled and unarvu, which aims at creating educational awareness among children in tribal hamlets.

== Controversies ==
In August 2012: He has been named as the 32nd accused in Shukoor murder case 2012 the charge sheet by police and was in judicial custody at the Kannur jail after his arrest 1 August 2012.
