= Daleema =

Indian playback singer and politician

Daleema Jojo
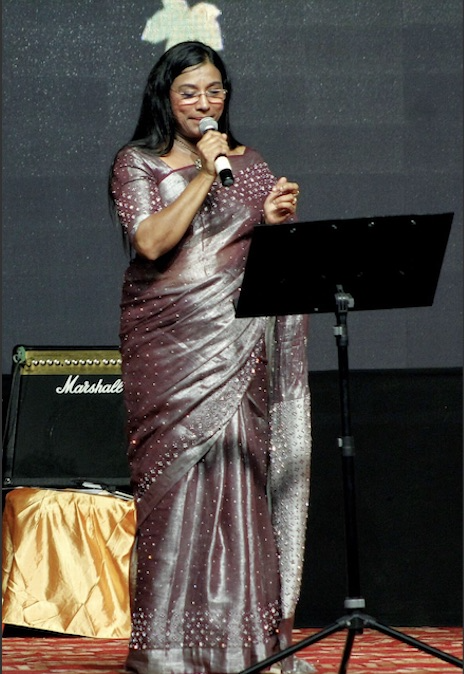

Member of Kerala Legislative Assembly
- In office 24 May 2021 – 3 May 2026
- Preceded by: Shanimol Osman
- Succeeded by: Shanimol Osman
- Constituency: Aroor

Personal details
- Born: Daleema John Arattukulam; 30 May 1965 (age 61) Ezhupunna, Kerala, India
- Party: CPI(M)
- Occupation: Playback singer, Politician

Daleema John Arattukulam (born 30 May 1965), known mononymously as Daleema, is an Indian playback singer and politician. She is popular for her Christian as well as Hindu devotional songs and made her debut as a playback singer in the Malayalam music industry through her title song "Thechi Malar Kadukalil" composed by Raveendran in the 1997 movie Kalyanappittannu. Her hit Malayalam songs include "Manjumasa Pakshi" from Krishnakudiyil Oru Pranayakalathu and "Ee Thennalum Thingalum" from Nee Varuvolam.

Daleema was elected and sworn as the District Vice President of Alappuzha after the 2015 Kerala local elections. After her victory in the 2021 Kerala Legislative Assembly election, she served as the member of the Kerala Legislative Assembly representing Aroor from 2021 until her defeat in the 2026 Kerala Legislative Assembly election.

== Early life ==
Daleema was born on 30 May 1969, as the youngest daughter to John Arattukulam and Ammini John. From a very young age she sang with her brothers and sisters in the village church choir. She decided to pursue singing after her pre-degree and under the guidance of Ramankutty master, she trained in Carnatic music for eight years.

== Musical Career ==
Daleema began her career by singing on stage shows. Through Kolping Society, she had the chance to sing on international programmes and shows in Germany and Italy for the Keralites who lived there. She sang in her first Christian devotional album which was composed by Berny Ignatius, and thereafter singing in over 5,000 Christian devotional albums. In 1995 she bagged a NANA Award for her song "Venal Poompular Vela" in the album Thapasya by Manorama Music. In the same year she sang for Sariga Audios for an album covering S. Janaki's old songs. Through these notable works, she entered the Malayalam film industry by singing in the hit movie Kalyanappittannu directed by K.K Haridas and furthermore singing in almost 20 other movies, a couple of Malayalam serials and around 100 Malayalam professional dramas. She won 3 Kerala Sangeetha Nadaka Academy state awards in the years 2001, 2003 and 2008, for the best singer, and also bagged 2 Drishya awards. She also dubbed many songs in Kannada and Telugu and sang in almost 2000 stage shows in the country as well as in Europe, America and in the Gulf Countries.

== Discography ==
Following is a partial discography

Year	Song	Film/Album	Music director	Co-singer(s)
1997	"Thechi Malar Kadukalil"	Kalyanappittanu	Raveendran	Krishnachandran
1997	"Manjumasa Pakshi"	Krishnagudiyil Oru Pranayakalathu	Vidyasagar	K.J. Yesudas
1997	"Eee Thenalum Thingalum"	Nee Varuvolam	Johnson	
1997	"Manjil Mungum Maamarathil"	Gajaraja Manthram	Berny-Ignatius	K.J. Yesudas
1997	"Neerani Kaatte Nadodi"	Avani Kanavukal	Bombay Ravi	
1997	"Kaana Kattin Tharivala Ilaki"	Aattuvela	Raveendran	Biju Narayanan
1997	"Kaneer Thudaykuvan Ammayundo"	Chandana Varnatheru	Vijay Kumar	
1997	"Moham Poothameniyil"	Sneha Swanthanam	Vijay Kumar	
1997	"Sundara Swapnathin Poonchirakil"	Sneha Swanthanam	Vijay Kumar	Biju Narayanan
1998	"Devalokamano"	Manthri Kochamma	Mohan Sithara	Manoj Krishnan
1998	"Koodevide Koodevide Oh Mridule" [F]	Manthri Kochamma	Mohan Sithara	
1998	"Oru Thulli Pala Thulli"	Sreekrishnapurathe Nakshathrathilakam	Bery-Ignatius	K.J. Yesudas, K.S. Chithra
1998	"Kakka Penne"	Kalapam	Berny-Ignatius, Prem Sagar, Thoppil Anto	M.G. Sreekumar
1998	"Kaathuvachoru Kalathilakkam"	Grama Panchayathu	Berny-Ignatius	M.G. Sreekumar
1998	"Raakkaviletho Kulirkkattupole"	Grama Panchayathu	Berny-Ignatius	K.J. Yesudas
1999	"Nilaavo Neermizhi Thaamarayil"	English Medium	Raveendran	
1999	"Vellaramkunnathu"	English Medium	Raveendran	
2000	Priya Priya	O Priye	Sidhartha Vijayan	
2000	Chempakame Kaananathil	O Priye	Sidhartha Vijayan	
2000	Kanna Njaan	Ente Priyappetta Muthuvinu	Raveendran	
2005	Nallavanaaye	Chathrapathi	MM Keeravani	
2008	Devi Kavyamohini	Mohitham	Thilak Sreemoolanagaram	Biju Narayanan
2008	Raga Vathi	Mohitham	Thilak Sreemoolanagaram	Biju Naryaanan
2011	Valampiri Shankil	Kochi	Sasi Thripunithra	
2014	Kaalidarumbol	Mummyude Swantham Achoos	Bharathlal	

== Personal life ==
Daleema is married to George Joseph (Jojo) and they have two children.

== Political career ==
Daleema entered into electoral politics by contesting and winning in the Aroor division of Alappuzha District council as a Left Democratic Front candidate in 2015 Kerala local elections. Subsequently, she was sworn in as the Vice President of the District Panchayat. She retained her seat in the 2020 Kerala local elections. Daleema defeated the nearest rival candidate Shanimol Osman of the Indian National Congress by a margin of 6842 votes and was elected to the 15th Kerala Assembly from Aroor Assembly constituency until her defeat in the 2026 Kerala Legislative Assembly election. She was the first playback singer to be elected to the Kerala Legislative Assembly.
