= V. K. Prasanth =

Indian politician

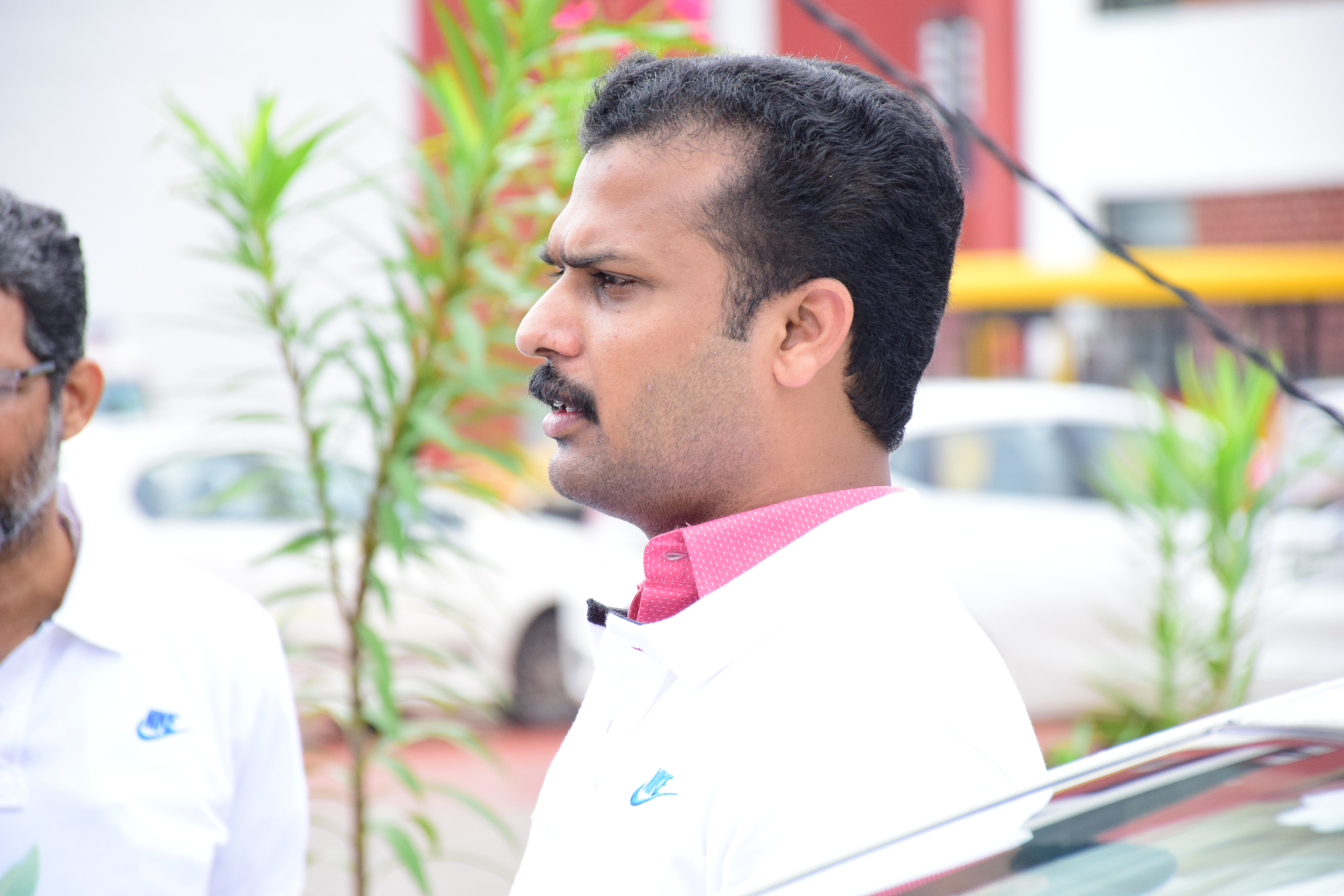

Member of Kerala Legislative Assembly
- In office 28 October 2019 – 23 May 2026
- Preceded by: K. Muraleedharan
- Succeeded by: K. Muraleedharan
- Constituency: Vattiyoorkavu

Mayor of Thiruvananthapuram Corporation
- In office 19 November 2015 – 28 October 2019
- Preceded by: K. Chandrika
- Succeeded by: K. Sreekumar
- Constituency: Kazhakootam

Personal details
- Born: 11 April 1981 (age 45) Kazhakoottam
- Party: Communist Party of India (Marxist)
- Education: BA, LLB
- Alma mater: Kerala Law Academy, St. Xavier's College

V. K. Prasanth is an Indian politician belonging to the Communist Party of India (Marxist). He was born and raised at Kazhakoottam, Thiruvananthapuram. In 2015, aged 34, he was elected to the Kazhakoottam ward of the city, with a margin of 3,272 votes, the highest majority secured by a candidate in the corporation's history. He went on to become the 44th mayor of Thiruvananthapuram, the largest corporation and capital of Kerala.

== 2019 Kerala legislative assembly by-election ==
The Left Democratic Front fielded V. K. Prasanth in Vattiyoorkavu constituency for the 2019 Kerala legislative assembly by-election necessitated after sitting MLA K. Muraleedharan was elected to the Lok Sabha in the 2019 Indian general election.

2019 Kerala Legislative Assembly by-elections: Vattiyoorkavu
Party	Candidate	Votes	%	±%
CPI(M)	V. K. Prasanth	54,830	44.25%	▲14.46
INC	K. Mohankumar	40,365	32.58%	▼5.23
BJP	S. Suresh	27,453	22.16%	▼10.03
NOTA	None of the Above	820	0.66%	▲0.06
Independent	A.Mohanakumar	135	0.11%	N/A
Independent	Nagaraj G.	100	0.08%	N/A
Independent	Suresh S. S.	93	0.08%	N/A
Independent	Murukan A.	76	0.06%	N/A
Independent	Mithran G.	38	0.03%	N/A
Majority		14,465	11.67%	▲6.06
Turnout		1,23,910	62.72%	▼7.11
CPI(M) gain from INC		Swing	▲14.46	

== 2021 Kerala legislative assembly election ==
V. K. Prasanth was reelected to Kerala Legislative Assembly from Vattiyoorkavu by vote margin of 21,515.

V. K. Prasanth | CPI(M) | LDF |61,111 - VOTES |41.44 |V. V. Rajesh | BJP | NDA |39,596 - VOTES |28.77
