= Adoor Prakash =

Indian politician

- Adoor Prakash

Convenor of United Democratic Front
- Incumbent
- Assumed office 8 May 2025
- Preceded by: M. M. Hassan

Member of Parliament, Lok Sabha
- Incumbent
- Assumed office 17 June 2019
- Speaker: Om Birla
- Preceded by: Anirudhan Sampath
- Constituency: Attingal

Minister for Health, Government of Kerala
- In office 23 May 2011 – 12 April 2012
- Chief Minister: Oommen Chandy
- Preceded by: P. K. Sreemathy
- Succeeded by: V. S. Sivakumar

Minister for Revenue, Government of Kerala
- In office 12 April 2012 – 20 May 2016
- Chief Minister: Oommen Chandy
- Preceded by: Thiruvanchoor Radhakrishnan
- Succeeded by: E. Chandrasekharan

Minister for Food and Civil Supplies, Government of Kerala
- In office 5 September 2004 – 12 May 2006
- Chief Minister: Oommen Chandy
- Preceded by: G. Karthikeyan
- Succeeded by: C. Divakaran

Member of Kerala Legislative Assembly
- In office 9 May 1996 – 23 May 2019
- Preceded by: A. Padmakumar
- Succeeded by: K. U. Jenish Kumar
- Constituency: Konni

Personal details
- Born: 24 May 1952 (age 74) Adoor, State of Travancore–Cochin (present day Kerala), India
- Party: Indian National Congress
- Spouse: Jayasree Prakash
- Children: 3
- Education: Bachelor of Arts; Bachelor of Laws
- Alma mater: Sree Narayana College, Chempazhanthy; The Kerala Law Academy Law College, Thiruvananthapuram

Prakash Kunjuraman, better known as Adoor Prakash, (born 24 May 1952) is an Indian politician from the Indian National Congress. He is currently the Member of Parliament, Lok Sabha, representing Attingal constituency of Kerala.

He came to active politics through the Student movement of Kerala Students Union. He was elected to the Kerala Legislative Assembly consecutively from Konni Constituency in 1996, 2001, 2006, 2011 and 2016 as a candidate of Indian National Congress. He served as minister of Food & Civil supplies from 2004 to 2006, Health and Coir from 2011 to 2012, Revenue from 2012 to 2016, all under Chief Minister Oommen Chandy.

In 2019, he was elected to the Loksabha from Attingal constituency in 2019, the first Congress candidate to be elected from the constituency since 1989. In 2024, he was reelected from Attingal defeating V Joy of the CPI(M). In 2025 he was appointed as the Convenor of United Democratic Front.

== Personal life ==
Prakash was born in Adoor on 24 May 1952 to N. Kunjuraman and V. M. Vilasini in a Ezhava family. He studied predegree from SB College Changanassery and later Sree Narayana College, Kollam and The Kerala Law Academy Law College, Thiruvananthapuram and graduated with a B.A. and LL.B. He's married to Jayasree and the couple has three children.

== Sources ==
- Parliament and later from of India - Lok Sabha
- Kerala State - Everything about Kerala
- KERALA's FIRST LEGISLATIVE ASSEMBLY
- Information Public Relations Department - IPRD | I&PRD : Official Website of Information Public Relations Department of Kerala
