= Aroor Assembly constituency =

Constituency of the Kerala legislative assembly in India

Coordinates: 9.87°N 76.31°E

Aroor
- Constituency No. 102 for the Kerala Legislative Assembly
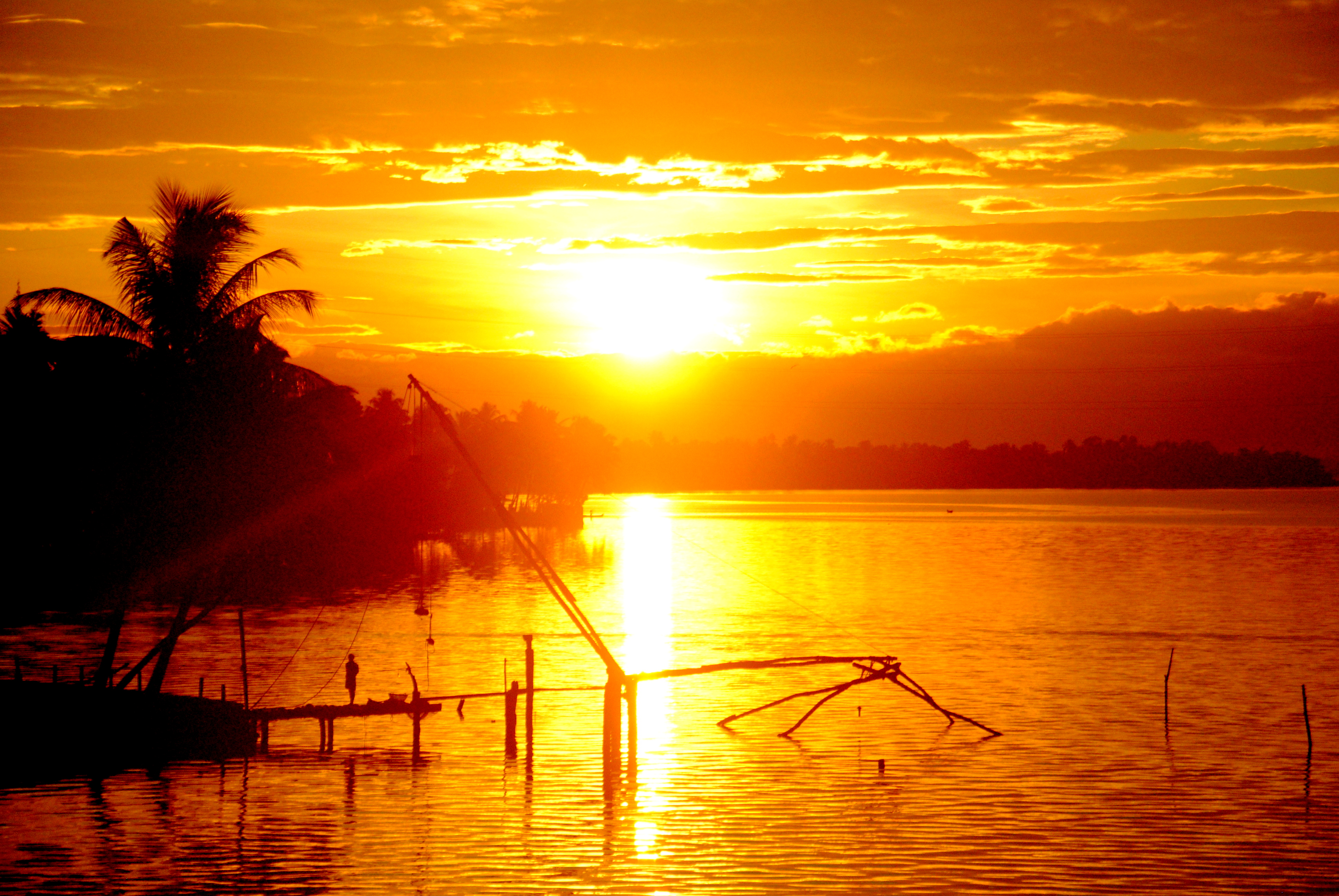
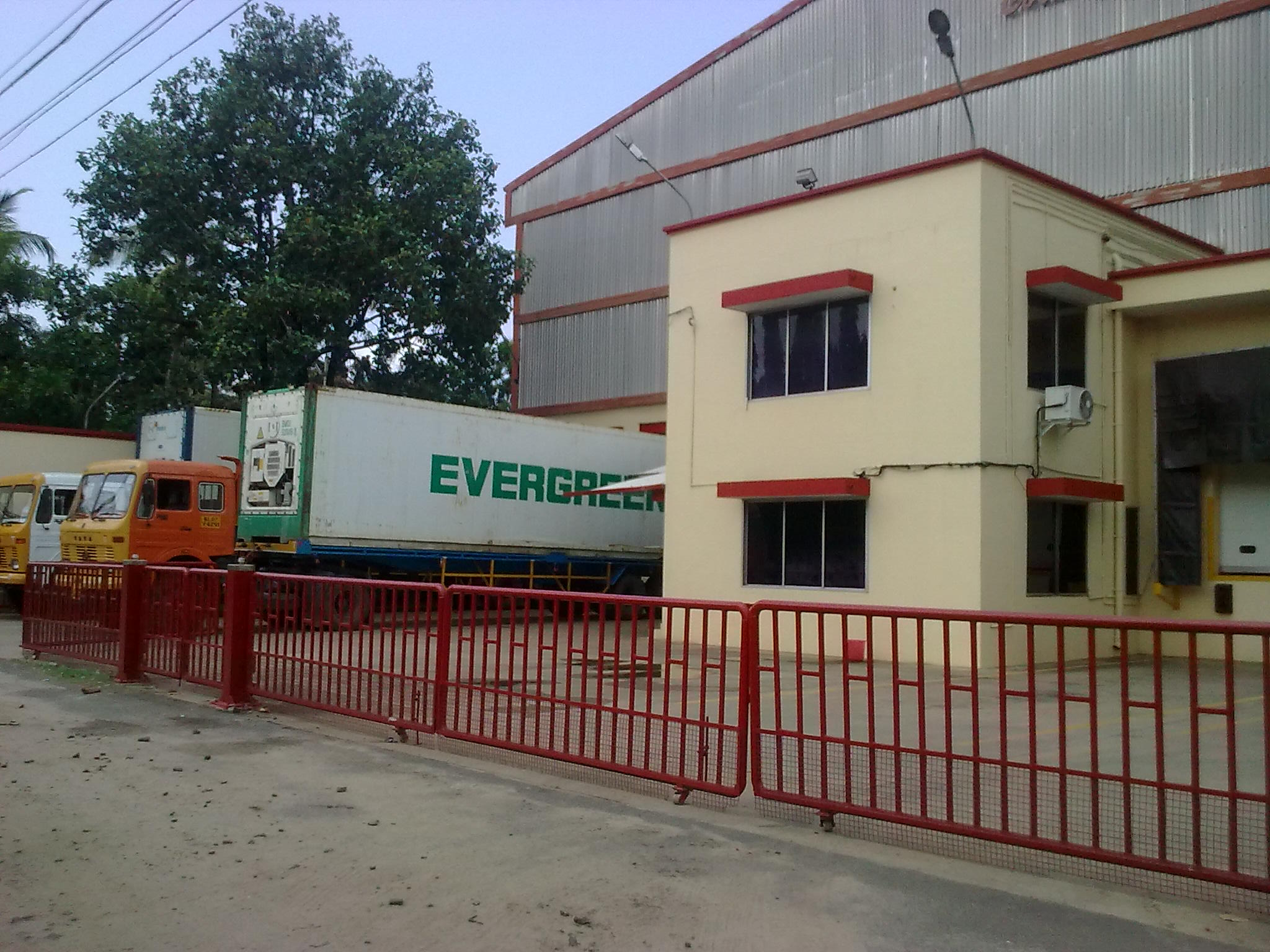
- Top to Bottom: sunrise from Aroor Bridge, seafood export processing plant at Aroor.

Constituency details
- Country: India
- Region: South India
- State: Kerala
- District: Alappuzha
- Lok Sabha constituency: Alappuzha
- Established: 1957
- Total electors: 1,91,898 (2019)
- Reservation: None

Member of Legislative Assembly
- 16th Kerala Legislative Assembly
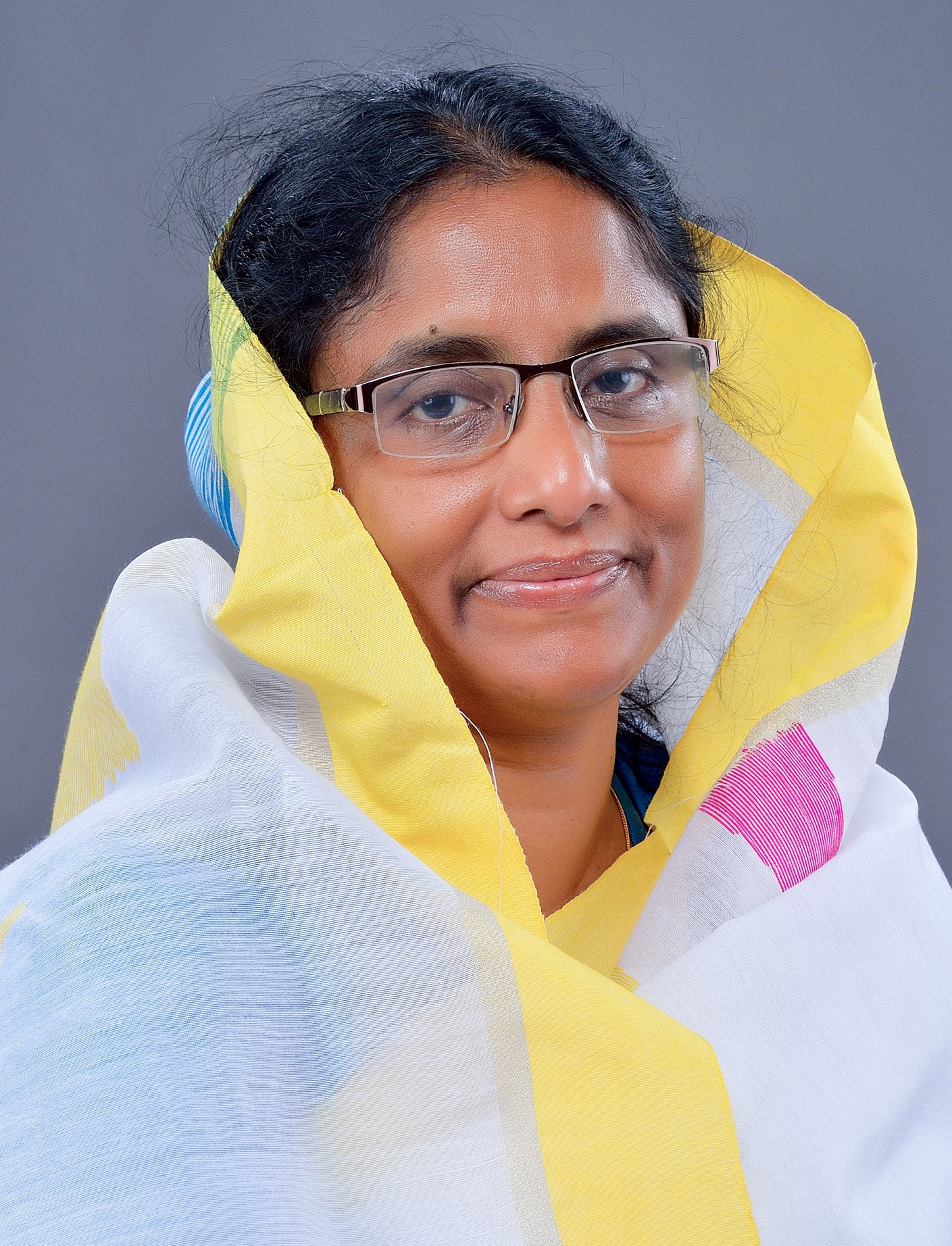
- Incumbent Shanimol Osman; Deputy Speaker of the Kerala Legislative Assembly
- Party: INC
- Alliance: UDF
- Elected year: 2026

Aroor State assembly constituency is one of the 140 state legislative assembly constituencies in Kerala in southern India. It is also one of the seven state legislative assembly constituencies included in Alappuzha Lok Sabha constituency. As of the 2026 assembly elections, the current MLA is Shanimol Osman of INC.

== Local self-governed segments ==
Aroor Assembly constituency is composed of the following local self-governed segments:

Name	Status (Grama panchayat/Municipality)	Taluk	Ruling Alliance
Arookutty	Grama panchayat	Cherthala	LDF
Aroor	Grama panchayat	Cherthala	UDF
Chennam - Pallippuram	Grama panchayat	Cherthala	NDA
Ezhupunna	Grama panchayat	Cherthala	UDF
Kodamthuruth	Grama panchayat	Cherthala	LDF
Kuthiathode	Grama panchayat	Cherthala	LDF
Panavally	Grama panchayat	Cherthala	LDF
Perumbalam	Grama panchayat	Cherthala	LDF
Thycattussery	Grama panchayat	Cherthala	LDF
Thuravoor	Grama panchayat	Cherthala	LDF

== Members of Legislative Assembly ==
The following list contains all members of Kerala Legislative Assembly who have represented Aroor Assembly constituency during the period of various assemblies:

Travancore - Cochin Legislative Assembly

1952- Avira Tharakan

1954- Avira Tharakan

Year	Member	Political party
1957	P. S. Karthikeyan	Indian National Congress
1960	P. S. Karthikeyan	Indian National Congress
1965	K. R. Gouri Amma	Communist Party of India (Marxist)
1967	K. R. Gouri Amma	Communist Party of India (Marxist)
1970	K. R. Gouri Amma	Communist Party of India (Marxist)
1977	P. S. Sreenivasan	Communist Party of India
1980	K. R. Gouri Amma	Communist Party of India (Marxist)
1982	K. R. Gouri Amma	Communist Party of India (Marxist)
1987	K. R. Gouri Amma	Communist Party of India (Marxist)
1991	K. R. Gouri Amma	Communist Party of India (Marxist)
1996	K. R. Gouri Amma	Janathipathiya Samrakshana Samithy
2001	K. R. Gouri Amma	Janathipathiya Samrakshana Samithy
2006	A. M. Ariff	Communist Party of India (Marxist)
2011	A. M. Ariff	Communist Party of India (Marxist)
2016	A. M. Ariff	Communist Party of India (Marxist)
2019^	Shanimol Osman	Indian National Congress
2021	Daleema	Communist Party of India
2026	Shanimol Osman	Indian National Congress

== Election results ==
Percentage change (±%) denotes the change in the number of votes from the immediate previous election.

=== 2026 ===
2026 Kerala Legislative Assembly election: Aroor
Party	Candidate	Votes	%	±%
INC	Shanimol Usman	74,469	45.98	▲4.27
CPI(M)	Daleema	65,145	40.22	▼5.76
BDJS	Adv. P. S. Jyothis	20,334	12.55	▲1.92
NOTA	None of the above	1,172	0.72	▲0.21
Bahujan Dravida Party	Vayalar Rajeevan	297	0.18	▲0.08
SUCI(C)	N. K. Sasikumar	317	0.20	▼0.03
Independent	Vipin	238	0.15	−
Margin of victory		9,324	5.76	▲1.50
Turnout		1,61,974	83.35	▲1.11
INC gain from CPI(M)		Swing	▲4.27	

=== 2021 ===
There were 2,00,005 registered voters in Aroor Constituency for the 2021 Kerala Assembly election.

2021 Kerala Legislative Assembly election: Aroor
Party	Candidate	Votes	%	±%
CPI(M)	Daleema	75,617	45.98	▲2.44
INC	Shanimol Usman	68,604	41.71	▼3.17
BDJS	T. Aniyappan	17,479	10.63	▲0.09
NOTA	None of the above	846	0.51	▼0.03
BSP	Rugma Prasad	682	0.41	−
DSJP	Ambika K. N.	682	0.41	−
SUCI(C)	K. Prathapan	374	0.23	−
Bahujan Dravida Party	Vayalar Rajeevan	164	0.10	−
Independent	Pramod Perumpuzha	161	0.10	−
Independent	Chandran	89	0.05	−
Margin of victory		7,013	4.26	▲2.92
Turnout		1,64,491	82.24	▲1.77
CPI(M) gain from INC		Swing	▲2.44	

=== 2019 by-election ===
Due to the election of the sitting MLA, A. M. Ariff, as the MP from Alappuzha Lok Sabha constituency, Aroor Assembly constituency held a by-election in 2019. There were 1,91,898 registered voters in Aroor Constituency for this election.

2019 Kerala Legislative Assembly by-elections: Aroor
Party	Candidate	Votes	%	±%
INC	Shanimol Usman	69,356	44.88%	▲16.34
CPI(M)	Manu C. Pulikkal	67,277	43.54%	▼8.80
BJP	K. P. Prakash Babu	16,289	10.54%	▼6.60
NOTA	None of the above	840	0.54%	▲0.09
Independent	Geetha Asokan	352	0.23%	N/A
Independent	K. B. Sunil Kumar	278	0.18%	N/A
Independent	Alleppy Sugunan	142	0.09%	N/A
Margin of victory		2,079	1.34%	▼22.46
Turnout		1,54,534	80.47%	▼5.35
INC gain from CPI(M)		Swing	▲16.34	

=== 2016 ===
There were 1,88,615 registered voters in Aroor Constituency for the 2016 Kerala Assembly election.

2016 Kerala Legislative Assembly election: Aroor
Party	Candidate	Votes	%	±%
CPI(M)	A. M. Ariff	84,720	52.34%	▲0.06
INC	C. R. Jayaprakash	46,201	28.54%	▼12.25
BDJS	T. Aniyappan	27,753	17.14%	▲12.04
WPOI	Mohan Chacko	761	0.47%	−
NOTA	None of the above	736	0.45%	−
SUCI(C)	K. Prathapan	556	0.34%	
SDPI	Liyakath Ali	434	0.27%	▼0.05
PDP	Faizal	433	0.27%	
Independent	Thuravoor Rajasekharan	281	0.17%	
Margin of victory		38,519	23.80%	▲12.31
Turnout		1,61,875	85.82%	▲1.59
CPI(M) hold		Swing	▲0.06	

=== 2011 ===
There were 1,74,130 registered voters in the constituency for the 2011 election.

2011 Kerala Legislative Assembly election: Aroor
Party	Candidate	Votes	%	±%
CPI(M)	A. M. Ariff	76,675	52.28	▲2.73
INC	A. A. Shukoor	59,823	40.79	▼4.72
BJP	T. Sajeev Lal	7,486	5.10	▲2.17
BSP	V. Lenin	787	0.54	▲0.19
Independent	Suresh Babu	776	0.53	−
SDPI	Jayaprakash	476	0.32	−
Independent	S. Sarath	378	0.26	−
Independent	T. P. Radhakrishnan	275	0.19	−
Margin of victory		16,852	11.49	▲7.45
Turnout		1,46,676	84.23	▲5.98
CPI(M) hold		Swing	▲2.73	

=== 2006 ===
There were 1,31,411 registered voters in the constituency for the 2006 election.

2006 Kerala Legislative Assembly election: Aroor
Party	Candidate	Votes	%	±%
CPI(M)	A. M. Ariff	58,218	49.55	▲9.67
JSS	K. R. Gowri Amma	53,465	45.51	▼4.48
BJP	N. V. Prakashan	3,437	2.93	▼0.79
Independent	Gowri	1,063	0.90	−
Independent	K. Prathapan	707	0.60	−
BSP	Thuravoor Suresh	407	0.35	−
Independent	K. C. Kochappan	186	0.16	−
Margin of victory		4,753	4.04	▼6.06
Turnout		1,17,483	78.25	▼0.61
CPI(M) gain from JSS		Swing	▲9.67	

=== 2001 ===
There were 1,54,969 registered voters in the constituency for the 2001 election.

2001 Kerala Legislative Assembly election: Aroor
Party	Candidate	Votes	%	±%
JSS	K. R. Gowri Amma	61,073	49.99	▼5.21
CPI(M)	K. V. Devadas	48,731	39.88	▼0.62
Independent	K. Rajeevan	5,521	4.52	
BJP	R. Viswakumar	4,545	3.72	▲0.12
Independent	K. S. Devadas	878	0.72	
Independent	K. Sabu Dinesh	496	0.41	
Independent	Sebastin J. Thankiyil	447	0.37	
Independent	M. K. Sasikumar	429	0.35	
Margin of victory		12,342	10.10	▼4.1
Turnout		1,22,204	78.86	▲3.34
JSS hold		Swing	▼5.21	

=== 1996 ===
There were 1,41,555 registered voters in the constituency for the 1996 election.

1996 Kerala Legislative Assembly election: Aroor
Party	Candidate	Votes	%	±%
JSS	K. R. Gowri Amma	61,972	55.2	▲8.5
CPI(M)	B. Vinod	45,439	40.5	▼9.4
BJP	H. Jayakumar	4,004	3.6	▲0.6
Independent	T. S. Balakrishnan	528	0.5.	
Independent	T. K. Vasu	232	0.2	
Independent	Prabhakaran Vava	156	0.1	
Margin of victory		16,533	14.2	▲11.0
Turnout		1,16,406	82.2	▼2.1
JSS gain from CPI(M)		Swing	▲8.5	

=== 1991 ===
There were 1,34,671 registered voters in the constituency for the 1991 election.

1991 Kerala Legislative Assembly election: Aroor
Party	Candidate	Votes	%	±%
CPI(M)	K. R. Gowri Amma	56,230	49.9	
INC	P. J. Francis	52,613	46.7	
BJP	V. Padmanabhan	3,357	3.0	
Independent	Chellappan Pillai	405	0.4	
Margin of victory		3,617	3.2	
Turnout		1,13,512	84.3	
CPI(M) hold		Swing		

== See also ==
- Aroor
- Alappuzha district
- List of constituencies of the Kerala Legislative Assembly
- 2016 Kerala Legislative Assembly election
- 2019 Kerala Legislative Assembly by-elections
