= A. M. Ariff =

Indian politician

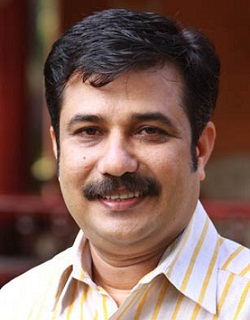

Member of Parliament, Lok Sabha
- In office 23 May 2019 – 4 June 2024
- Preceded by: K. C. Venugopal
- Constituency: Alappuzha

Member of Kerala Legislative Assembly
- In office 2006–2019
- Preceded by: K. R. Gowri Amma
- Succeeded by: Shanimol Usman
- Constituency: Aroor

Personal details
- Born: 20 May 1964 (age 62) Mannar, Kerala, India
- Party: Communist Party of India (Marxist)

A. M. Ariff is an Indian politician and a former Member of Parliament representing Alappuzha constituency from 2019 till 2024. A member of the Communist Party of India (Marxist), he represented Aroor constituency in Kerala Legislative Assembly from 2006 to 2019. Ariff made his first win from Aroor in 2006 defeating veteran political leader K. R. Gowri Amma. A. M. Ariff has been elected 3 times from Aroor to Kerala Legislative in the years 2006, 2011 and 2016. Ariff was elected to Loksabha in 2019 from Alappuzha.

In a major electoral upset in the 2006 assembly elections, he defeated then-state Agriculture Minister and veteran politician K.R. Gouriamma. In the 2016 Kerala Legislative Assembly Elections, he was placed third in the list of candidates who secured the most votes. In 2017, he was awarded the Best MLA in India Award by Kashmir to Kerala Social Foundation. In 17th Lok Sabha he is the only LDF and CPI(M) MP from Kerala.

== Political life ==
Ariff began his active political life through student politics as a BSc degree student at Cherthala S.N. College where he was elected as College Union magazine editor and later, as chairman of the union. He subsequently held a series of positions in SFI as Cherthala area president, Alappuzha district secretary and finally became a state committee member of the student wing of the party. He later became a state committee member of DYFI, the youth wing of CPI(M).

== Legislative career ==
Election	Year	Party	Constituency	Result	Margin
Kerala Legislative Assembly
Kerala Legislative Assembly	2006	CPI(M)	Aroor	Won	4,753
Kerala Legislative Assembly	2011	CPI(M)	Aroor	Won	16,852
Kerala Legislative Assembly	2016	CPI(M)	Aroor	Won	38,519
Kerala Legislative Assembly	2026	CPI(M)	Aluva	Lost	29,143
Loksabha	2019	CPI(M)	Alappuzha	Won	10,474
Loksabha	2024	CPI(M)	Alappuzha	Lost	63,513
