= Shanimol Osman =

Indian politician

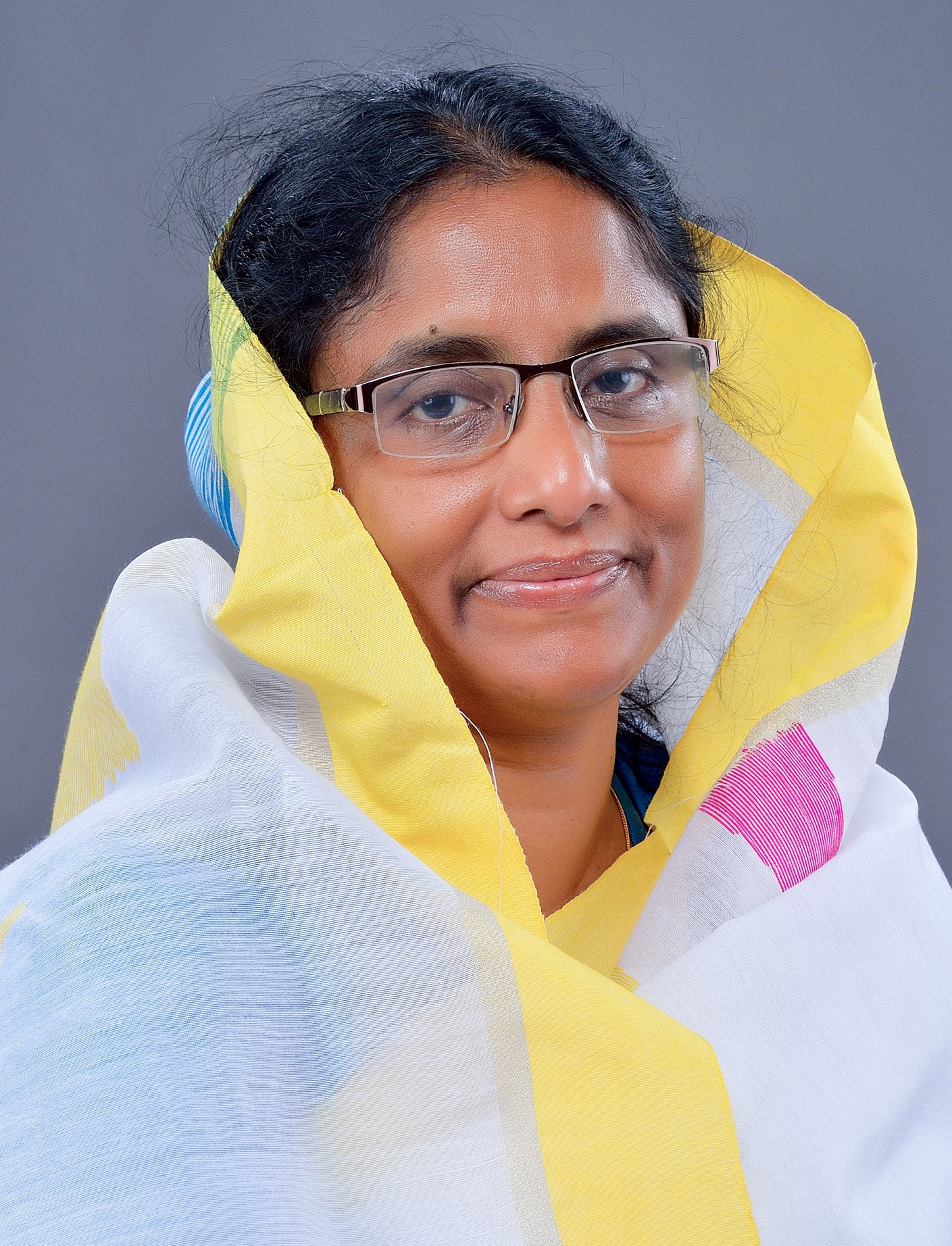

Deputy Speaker of the Kerala Legislative Assembly
- Incumbent
- Assumed office 2 June 2026
- Speaker: Thiruvanchoor Radhakrishnan
- Preceded by: Chittayam Gopakumar

Member of the Kerala Legislative Assembly
- Incumbent
- Assumed office 21 May 2026
- Preceded by: Daleema
- Constituency: Aroor

Member of the Kerala Legislative Assembly
- In office 28 October 2019 – 24 May 2021
- Preceded by: A. M. Ariff
- Succeeded by: Daleema
- Constituency: Aroor

Personal details
- Born: 30 May 1966 (age 60) Alappuzha, Kerala, India
- Party: Indian National Congress
- Spouse: Adv. Mohammed Osman
- Children: 2
- Education: Master of Arts; Bachelor of Laws
- Alma mater: Loyola College of Social Sciences, Thiruvananthapuram; The Kerala Law Academy Law College, Thiruvananthapuram
- Profession: Politician; Lawyer; Social worker

Shanimol Osman (born 30 May 1966) is an Indian politician from Kerala. She currently serves as the Deputy Speaker of the Kerala Legislative Assembly. She represents Aroor constituency in the Kerala Legislative Assembly since 21 May 2026. Shanimol is a member of the Indian National Congress.

== Political career ==
Electoral History
Election	Party	House	Constituency	Status
2011	INC	Kerala Legislative Assembly	Perumbavoor	Lost
2016	INC	Kerala Legislative Assembly	Ottapalam	Lost
2019	INC	Lok Sabha	Alappuzha	Lost
2019^	INC	Kerala Legislative Assembly	Aroor	Won
2021	INC	Kerala Legislative Assembly	Aroor	Lost
2026	INC	Kerala Legislative Assembly	Aroor	Won

^ - Indicates 2019 By- election

She is the first female leader from Kerala to become the secretary of the All India Congress Committee. She is an LLB Degree holder who graduated from Kerala Law Academy in Thiruvananthapuram. She contested from Alappuzha in the 2019 Indian general election but lost to Adv. A. M. Ariff of the Communist Party of India (Marxist) by 9213 votes.

In the 2019 Kerala Legislative Assembly by-elections, she won from Aroor Assembly constituency by defeating her nearest rival candidate, Manu C. Pulickal of the CPI(M) by a margin of 2,079 votes.

Shanimol Osman was the only female MLA from the UDF in the 14th Kerala Legislative Assembly.
