= K. U. Jenish Kumar =

Indian politician

- അഡ്വ. കെ. യു. ജെനിഷ് കുമാര്‍

Member of the Kerala Legislative Assembly
- Incumbent
- Assumed office 28 October 2019
- Preceded by: Adoor Prakash
- Constituency: Konni

Personal details
- Born: 10 April 1983 (age 43) Seethathodu
- Party: Communist Party of India (Marxist)
- Spouse: Anumol C A
- Education: St. Thomas College, Ranni; Sidhartha Law College, Gulbarga

K. U. Jenish Kumar (born 10 April 1983) is an Indian politician belonging to the Communist Party of India (Marxist). He is a member of the Kerala Legislative Assembly representing Konni constituency.

== Life ==
K. U. Jenish Kumar was born on 10 April 1983 at Seethathodu to Uthaman P. and Vijayamma K. K. He completed his bachelor's degree in economics from St. Thomas College, Ranni and later completed his law degree from Sidhartha Law College, Gulbarga. He is enrolled as an advocate at Pathanamthitta District Bar. He married Anumol C A.

== Political life ==
K. U. Jenish Kumar entered politics through Students' Federation of India. He was the Unit Secretary of SFI in K.R.P.M H.S.S Seethathodu. He also held the role of being a school leader during this time. During his days as a bachelor's student in St. Thomas College, Ranni, he was elected first as the Union Chairman of the college. He then became the University Union Councillor of Mahatma Gandhi University, Kerala. Gradually he assumed more important role in student politics by being the area secretary of SFI committee in Ranni and later as the president and secretary of the SFI Pathanamthitta District Committee. His days in youth politics made him the district secretary of Democratic Youth Federation of India (DYFI) in Pathanamthitta. Being an active worker in the Communist Party of India (Marxist), he assumed the role of being the secretary of Seethathodu Local Committee at an early age. He is currently the district committee member of CPI(M) in Pathanamthitta and the Kerala state vice president of Democratic Youth Federation of India.

In 2010, he won the Seethathodu Grama Panchayat election after defeating the Indian National Congress in highest margin recorded in Kerala.

He is currently a member of the Kerala State Youth Commission, a quasi-judicial institution under the Government of Kerala.

He was a delegate to World Festival of Youth and Students held at Sochi, Russia on 14 to 22 August 2017.

He is also a member of the Senate at Mahatma Gandhi University, Kerala.

=== Kerala Legislative Assembly by-election ===
Representing CPI(M) in the Left Democratic Front, K. U. Jenish Kumar won from Konni constituency for the 2019 Kerala legislative assembly by-election held on 21 October 2019. The by-election was held in the context where the then sitting MLA Adoor Prakash got elected to the Lok Sabha in the 2019 Indian general election.

The result was considered historic as the constituency was dominated by INC for 23 years prior to this election.

2019 Kerala Legislative Assembly by-elections : Konni
| Party | Candidate | Votes | % | ±% |
|---|---|---|---|---|
| CPI(M) | K. U. Jenish Kumar | 54,099 | 38.96% | ▲2.63 |
| INC | P. Mohanraj | 44,146 | 31.79% | ▼19.02 |
| BJP | K. Surendran | 39,786 | 28.65% | ▲16.99 |
| NOTA | None of the above | 469 | 0.34% | ▲0.01 |
| Independent | Joemon Joseph Srampickal | 235 | 0.17% | N/A |
| Independent | Sivanandan | 124 | 0.09% | N/A |
| Margin of victory | | 9,953 | 7.17% | ▼7.31 |
| Turnout | | 1,38,859 | 70.07% | ▼2.92 |
| CPI(M) gain from INC | | Swing | ▲2.63 | |

Both K. U. Jenish Kumar and district collector P. B. Nooh IAS received public praise for bringing food items directly to Avanippara Girijan Colony as part of the MLA's Kaithangu scheme after trekking 3 km (1.9 mi) in forest. They carried the sacks of rice and provisions on their shoulders as they trekked through the difficult terrain to help 37 families.
