= Konni Assembly constituency =

Constituency of the Kerala legislative assembly in India

Konni
- Constituency No. 114 for the Kerala Legislative Assembly
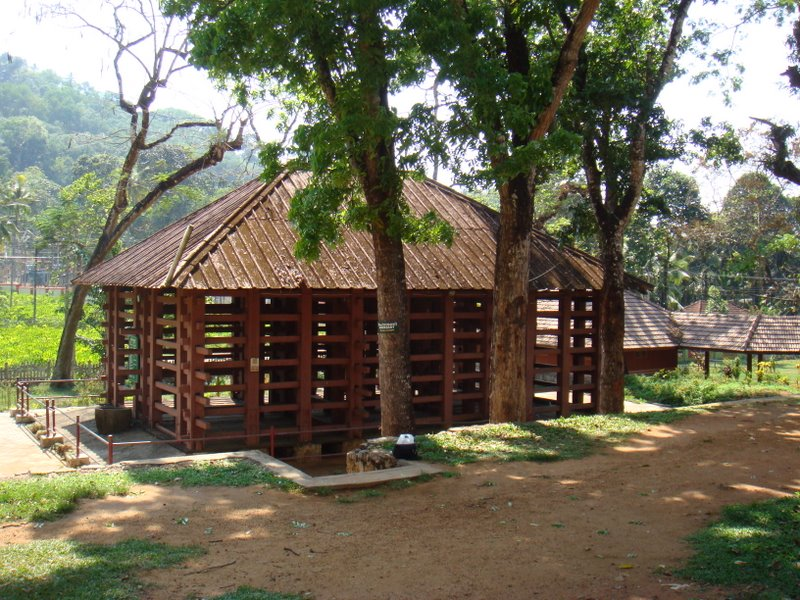
- Elephant Training Centre in Konni Assembly constituency

Constituency details
- Country: India
- Region: South India
- State: Kerala
- District: Pathanamthitta
- Established: 1965
- Total electors: 2,02,728 (2021)
- Reservation: None

Member of Legislative Assembly
- 16th Kerala Legislative Assembly
- Incumbent K. U. Jenish Kumar
- Party: CPI(M)
- Alliance: LDF
- Elected year: 2026

Konni State assembly constituency is one of the 140 state legislative assembly constituencies in Kerala in southern India. It is also one of the seven state legislative assembly constituencies included in Pathanamthitta Lok Sabha constituency. As of the 2026 Kerala Legislative Assembly election, the current MLA is K. U. Jenish Kumar of CPI(M).

== Local self-governed segments ==
Konni Assembly constituency is composed of the following local self-governed segments:

Sl no.	Name	Status (Grama panchayat/Municipality)	Taluk
1	Aruvappulam	Grama panchayat	Konni
2	Konni	Grama panchayat	Konni
3	Malayalapuzha	Grama panchayat	Konni
4	Pramadom	Grama panchayat	Konni
5	Mylapra	Grama panchayat	Konni
6	Vallicode	Grama panchayat	Konni
7	Thannithode	Grama panchayat	Konni
8	Seethathodu	Grama panchayat	Konni
9	Kalanjoor	Grama panchayat	Konni
10	Chittar	Grama panchayat	Konni
11	Enadimangalam	Grama panchayat	Adoor

== Members of Legislative Assembly ==
The following list contains all members of Kerala Legislative Assembly who have represented Konni Assembly constituency during the period of various assemblies:

Year	Member	Political party
1967	P. R. Madhavan Pillai	Communist Party of India
1970	P. J. Thomas	Indian National Congress
1977	P. J. Thomas	Indian National Congress
1980	V. S. Chandra Sekhar Pillai	Communist Party of India (Marxist)
1982	V. S. Chandra Sekhar Pillai	Communist Party of India (Marxist)
1987	Chittoor Sasankan Nair	Independent politician
1991	A. Padmakumar	Communist Party of India (Marxist)
1996	Adoor Prakash	Indian National Congress
2001	Adoor Prakash	Indian National Congress
2006	Adoor Prakash	Indian National Congress
2011	Adoor Prakash	Indian National Congress
2016	Adoor Prakash	Indian National Congress
2019^	K. U. Jenish Kumar	Communist Party of India (Marxist)
2021	K. U. Jenish Kumar	Communist Party of India (Marxist)
2026	K. U. Jenish Kumar	Communist Party of India (Marxist)

^by-election

== Election results ==
Percentage change (±) denotes the change in the number of votes from the immediate previous election.

=== 2026 ===
There were 1,90,246 registered voters in Konni assembly constituency in the 2026 Kerala assembly election.

2026 Kerala Legislative Assembly election: Konni
Party	Candidate	Votes	%	±%
CPI(M)	K. U. Jenish Kumar	60,380	44.59	▲2.97
INC	Satheesh Kochuparambil	58,542	43.23	▲7.29
BDJS	T. P. Sundareshan	15,278	11.28	−
NOTA	None of the above	805	0.59	▲0.34
Independent	Varughese Oommen	400	0.30	−
Margin of victory		1,838	1.35	▼5.82
Turnout		1,35,405	71.17	▲1.10
CPI(M) hold		Swing	-	

Local body	No. of polling stations	LDF	UDF	BJP/NDA	Leading alliance	Lead
Mylapra	10	2,958	1,947	643	LDF	1,011
Malayalappuzha	18	3,907	4,774	1,404	UDF	867
Thannithodu	22	5,919	6,265	970	UDF	346
Seethathodu	25	4,407	7,810	866	UDF	3,403
Konni	27	8,738	6,299	1,680	LDF	2,439
Pramadom	29	8,005	6,894	2,205	LDF	1,111
Vallikkode	19	4,862	4,703	1,516	LDF	159
Enadimangalam	28	6,590	7,193	2,026	UDF	603
Kalanjoor	29	6,638	8,255	2,336	UDF	1,617
Aruvappulam	21	5,162	5,115	1,346	LDF	47
Total EVM votes	228	57,186	59,255	14,992	UDF	2,069
Postal ballot votes		1,356	1,125	286	LDF	231
Total votes		58,542	60,380	15,278	UDF	1,838

=== 2021 ===
There were 2,02,728 registered voters in Konni Assembly constituency for the 2021 Kerala Assembly election.

2021 Kerala Legislative Assembly election: Konni
Party	Candidate	Votes	%	±%
CPI(M)	K. U. Jenish Kumar	62,318	41.62	▲2.66
INC	Robin Peter	53,810	35.94	▲4.15
BJP	K. Surendran	32,811	21.91	▼6.74
NOTA	None of the above	372	0.25	
CPI(M) hold		Swing		

=== 2019 by-election ===
Due to the election of the sitting MLA Adoor Prakash as the MP from Attingal Lok Sabha constituency, Konni Assembly constituency held a by-election in 2019. There were 1,97,956 registered voters in Konni Assembly constituency for this election.

2019 Kerala Legislative Assembly by-elections: Konni
Party	Candidate	Votes	%	±%
CPI(M)	K. U. Jenish Kumar	54,099	38.96	▲2.63
INC	P. Mohanraj	44,146	31.79	▼19.02
BJP	K. Surendran	39,786	28.65	▲16.99
NOTA	None of the above	469	0.34	▲0.01
Independent	Joemon Joseph Srampickal	235	0.17	N/A
Independent	Sivanandan	124	0.09	N/A
Margin of victory		9,953	7.17	▼7.31
Turnout		1,38,859	70.07	▼2.92
CPI(M) gain from INC		Swing	▲2.63	

=== 2016 ===
There were 1,96,309 registered voters in Konni Assembly constituency for the 2016 Kerala Assembly election.

2016 Kerala Legislative Assembly election: Konni
Party	Candidate	Votes	%	±%
INC	Adoor Prakash	72,800	50.81	▲0.66
CPI(M)	R. Sanal Kumar	52,052	36.33	▼7.89
BJP	Asoka Kumar D.	16,713	11.66	▲7.09
NOTA	None of the above	474	0.33	
SDPI	Reyash	401	0.28	
WPOI	Joshy Joseph	365	0.25	
Independent	Suresh V.	249	0.17	
Independent	Biju Elamannoor	133	0.09	
SS	Vishnu S.	97	0.07	
Margin of victory		20,748	14.48	▲8.55
Turnout		1,43,283	72.99	▲1.13
INC hold		Swing	▲0.66	

=== 2011 ===
There were 1,82,384 registered voters in the constituency for the 2011 election.

2011 Kerala Legislative Assembly election: Konni
Party	Candidate	Votes	%	±%
INC	Adoor Prakash	65,724	50.15	
CPI(M)	M. S. Rajendran	57,950	44.22	
BJP	V. S. Harish Chandran	5,994	4.57	
Independent	Sinto Stephen	655	0.50	
Independent	Thattayil Saraswathi	276	0.21	
SUCI(C)	Lekshmi R. Shekhar	247	0.19	
Independent	Renjini C. T.	207	0.16	
Margin of victory		7,774	5.93	
Turnout		1,31,053	71.86	
INC hold		Swing		

== See also ==
- Konni
- Pathanamthitta district
- List of constituencies of the Kerala Legislative Assembly
- 2016 Kerala Legislative Assembly election
- 2019 Kerala Legislative Assembly by-elections
