= Vattiyoorkavu =

Neighbourhood in Kerala, India

Vattiyoorkavu is located in the north-eastern side of Thiruvananthapuram city, Kerala, India. Killi River and Karamana River flows through this area. It is one among the four legislative constituencies which are a part of Thiruvananthapuram city and is represented in the Kerala Legislative Assembly by Adv. V. K. Prasanth. It is one of the most important residential suburbs of the city and is an important link in connecting the city with several outer areas such as Kachani, Aruvikkara, Puliyarakonam, etc. It is a comparatively high-lying area of the city. Vattiyoorkavu is one of the greenest parts of the city. Other important area nearby Vattiyoorkavu are Maruthamkuzhi, Sasthamangalam, Elippodu, Kulasekharam etc. It comes under the jurisdiction of Vattiyoorkavu police station which is located in Vattiyoorkavu junction. Vattiyoorkavu has its own post office (PIN-695013), telecom Exchange and electricity (KSEB) section as well. There are regular buses to Kizhakekotta (EAST FORT) as well as other areas of the city which pass through the Vattiyoorkavu bus stop. Two auto stands and one taxi stand are also present near the junction.

== Etymology ==
The name Vattiyoorkavu is believed to be derived from three words, Vatti - which means winding a hilly tract, Ooru - which means land, and Kavu - which means sacred grove.

== Institutions ==
Educational institutions in the area includes Central Polytechnic College, Bharathiya Vidya Bhavan, Saraswathy Vidyalaya, Ananthamurthy International School, A.R.R Public School, St Shanthal School Malamugal and Vattiyoorkavu Govt. Higher secondary school. One of the units of ISRO is also situated here. Unit of Geological Survey of India, C.P.W.D. quarters, Headquarters of Kerala State Centre for Advanced Printing and Training and production centre of State Nirmithi Kerndra is located here.

Aruvikkara Dam is 9 km from Vattiyoorkavu. Museum, Zoo, Kowdiar Palace (Kottaram) are approximately 5 km by distance.

== Places of worship ==
The stones for the renovation of Sri Padmanabha swamy temple was mined from Kulashekharam, which is in Vattiyoorkavu. The Chamundi Temple at Thozhuvancode, Kadayilmudumbu Devi Temple, Sree krishna temple(kanjirampara), St Francis De Sales, Syro malabar catholic church, Vimalahruthaya church, CSI Christasramam An ancient Muslim mosque is located there, and their grave is located there.Church(Moonnamoodu), Sastha Temple, Devi temple at Puthoorkonam, Saraswaathy temple (arappura), St.Peter's & St.Paul's Orthodox Syrian Church, and Juma Masjid are the old places of worship here. The mosque of Juma Masjid was built by the successors of the Muslim Cavalry soldiers of the Nair Brigade of Travancore, who had settled in Sasthamangalam and Vattiyoorkavu.

== Historical Demographics and Religion ==
The predominant religious community in the area are Hindus, especially Nairs which constitute 54 per of total population, followed by Christians, and then by Muslims . This area of Travancore kingdom had been historically dominated by artisan caste people, who worked in the quarries to build the bricks, stones and masonry for the temples and palaces of Travancore kingdom in the capital city. with the development of the city, vattiyoorkavu became one of the most sought after residential areas in the city mostly for middle-class people due to the availability of most city facilities in a comparatively green and clean locality at comparatively affordable rates. In recent years, land prices have increased and several flats and apartment complexes have come up in the region and more upmarket residential areas have been created. This can be mostly attributed to the presence of large number of excellent educational institutions including Saraswathi Vidyalaya and Bharatiya Vidya Bhavan. As a result the junction and surrounding areas are now affected by regular traffic blocks. The next phase of the TRIP, Trivandrum road improvement project is centred on Vattiyoorkavu and aims to develop the junction as well as extend the four lane road with carriageways from Sasthamangalam to Peroorkada via Vattiyoorkavu.
The Central Polytechnic College in Vattiyoorkavu, mechanical association was formed on 26-07-2010.
Neighbourhood of vattiyoorkavu are Kanjirampara, Kodunganoor, Elipoodu, Nettayam, Mannammoola, arappura, ptp nagar, melathumele etc.

== Major landmarks ==
- International Shooting range at CPT Campus, Nettayam, Vattiyoorkaavu - The 3rd Largest Shooting range in India
- ISRO Inertial Systems Unit, Nettayam, Vattiyoorkaavu
- Geological Survey of India, Nettayam, Vattiyoorkaavu
- Central Polytechnic College(CPT), Nettayam, Vattiyoorkaavu
- Govt. Vocational & Higher Secondary School, Vattiyoorkavu
- Saraswathy Vidyalaya, Arappura jn., Vattiyoorkaavu
- Bharatheeya Vidya Bhavan, Kodunganoor, Vattiyoorkaavu
- Guru Gopinath Nadanagramam, Kodunganoor, Vattiyoorkaavu
- Asianet Studio(Comedy stars), Mannarakkonam, Vattiyorkaavu
- General Pool Residence Association(GPRA) Quarters, Melethumele, Vattiyoorkaavu
- St Shantal Senior Secondary school, Malamukal
- A.R.R Public School
- Ethan Garden tariff
