= Peroorkada =

Peroorkada Perurkada, Maruthammoodu
- Urban area Ward 31
- Nickname: Perurkada
- Location in Kerala, India
- Coordinates: 8.537250°N 76.96650°E
- Country: India
- State: Kerala
- District: Thiruvananthapuram
- Talukas: Thiruvananthapuram

Government
  - Body: Corporation of Thiruvananthapuram

Languages
  - Official: Malayalam, English
- Time zone: UTC+5:30 (IST)
- PIN: 695005
- Vehicle registration: KL 01
- Literacy: 95%
- Civic agency: Corporation of Thiruvananthapuram

Peroorkada is a suburb of Thiruvananthapuram in the state of Kerala, India. The area has a police station.

In September 2025, work on the proposed flyover in the area started by demolishing some structures. A stretch of 874 metres starting from Lourdes church and ending at St Jude's church at Vazhayila was cleared. In January 2026, tenders were called for the flyover work worth Rs.67 crores.

In 2025, the Peroorkada Municipal Corporation elections were held.

== Notable people ==
- Manikuttan

== Educational institutions ==
- Kerala Law Academy
