= Bharatiya Janata Party – Kerala =

Kerala affiliate of the Bharatiya Janata Party

- Abbreviation: BJP
- President: Rajeev Chandrasekhar
- Founded: 6 April 1980 (46 years ago)
- Headquarters: Thiruvananthapuram, Kerala - 695014
- Student wing: Akhil Bharatiya Vidyarthi Parishad
- Colours: Saffron
- Alliance: National Democratic Alliance
- Seats in Rajya Sabha: 0 / 9
- Seats in Lok Sabha: 1 / 20
- Seats in Kerala Legislative Assembly: 3 / 140

Election symbol
- Lotus

Party flag

Website
- www.keralabjp.org

The Bharatiya Janata Party – Kerala , is the Kerala state unit of the Bharatiya Janata Party (BJP), a major national political party in India. While BJP has held significant power at the national level, its influence in Kerala has historically been limited, given the dominance of the Left Democratic Front (LDF) led by the Communist Party of India (Marxist) and on the other side, the United Democratic Front (UDF) alliance particularly the Indian National Congress.

Despite this, the party has steadily built a base in urban pockets through active participation in socio-political movements and national support since the premiership of Narendra Modi in form of media dominance, corporate funding and organisational expansion. Historically a minor player in Kerala's electoral politics, BJP won its first assembly constituency in 2016 by winning in Nemom and Suresh Gopi became the first BJP MP elected from Kerala in 2024. BJP Kerala is headquartered in Thiruvananthapuram and is currently led by Rajeev Chandrasekhar. It currently has 3 seats in Kerala state legislative assembly.

The party won its first ever MLA from Kerala in 2016 when party veteran O. Rajagopal defeated V. Sivankutty of the CPI(M) in Nemom. However, the party lost the Nemom seat in the 2021 election by a narrow margin. The party won its first-ever Lok Sabha MP from the state in 2024 when actor-turned politician Suresh Gopi defeated V. S. Sunil Kumar of the CPI(M) in Thrissur by a margin of 74,686 votes, marking a significant event for the party in Kerala that has historically been dominated by the Communist-led LDF and Congress-led UDF.

== History ==
The BJP's roots in Kerala trace back to the Bharatiya Jana Sangh, established in 1951. After the formation of BJP in 1980, the Kerala unit was officially organized, aiming to expand the party's ideology in a state dominated by the Congress and Left parties.

=== Key milestones ===
- 1980s–90s: Limited electoral success; groundwork through the Rashtriya Swayamsevak Sangh (RSS) network.
- 1991: First notable impact in the Assembly elections.
- 2004–2014: Emergence in urban areas like Thiruvananthapuram and Palakkad.
- 2016: Historic breakthrough with O. Rajagopal winning the Nemom Assembly seat—the first BJP MLA in Kerala.
- 2021: BJP Kerala Lost Nemom and failed to win any Assembly seats, but gained vote share in several constituencies.
- 2024: Suresh Gopi, a popular Malayalam actor and Rajya Sabha MP, wins the Thrissur Lok Sabha seat, marking BJP's first-ever victory in Lok Sabha election from Kerala.This victory was seen as a symbolic and strategic breakthrough for the party in Kerala.
- 2025: Rajeev Chandrasekhar appointed as the new State President on 24 March 2025
- 2025: The 2025 Kerala Local Body Elections marked a historic political breakthrough for the BJP/NDA, with the alliance winning Kerala’s first-ever Municipal Corporation by emerging as the single largest front in Thiruvananthapuram, securing 26 Gram Panchayats across multiple districts, strengthening its presence in key municipalities like Palakkad and Thrippunithura, and signaling the rise of a competitive third front as the party expanded its urban footprint, deepened grassroots influence, and reshaped Kerala’s traditionally bipolar political landscape.
- 2026: In the 2026 Kerala Legislative Assembly election, Bharatiya Janata Party achieved its best-ever performance in the state, winning three seats (Nemom, Kazhakoottam, and Chathannoor) and securing its first multi-seat representation in the assembly.

== Organizational Structure ==
The following is the current organizational structure of the Bharatiya Janata Party – Kerala as of July 2025:

=== BJP Kerala Organizational Structure (2025) ===
| Position | Name |
|---|---|
| State President | Rajeev Chandrasekhar |
| General Secretaries | M. T. Ramesh; Sobha Surendran; S. Suresh; Anoop Antony Joseph |
| Vice Presidents | K. S. Radhakrishnan; C. Sadanandan; P. Sudheer; C. Krishnakumar; B. Gopalakrishnan; Dr. Abdul Salam; R. Sreelekha (Retd. IPS); K. Soman; K. K. Aneesh Kumar; Shaun George |
| State Secretaries | Ashokan Kulanada; K. Ranjith; Renu Suresh; V. V. Rajesh; Pandalam Prathapan; Jiji Joseph; M. V. Gopakumar; Poonthura Sreekumar; P. Shyamraj; M. P. Anjana Ranjith |
| State Spokesperson | Palode Santhosh |
| Treasurer | E. Krishnadas |
| Social Media Convener | Abhijith R. Nair |
| Media Convener | Sandeep Somanath |
| State Cell Coordinator | V. K. Sajeevan |
| Zonal Presidents | K. Sreekanth; V. Unnikrishnan; A. Nagesh; N. Hari; B. B. Gopakumar |

=== List of State Presidents - BJP Kerala ===
President of Bharatiya Janata Party, Kerala
| S.No. | Portrait | Name (born /death) | Term in office | | |
| S.No. | Portrait | Name (born /death) | Assumed office | Left office | Time in office |
| 1 | | O. Rajagopal (b. 15 September 1929) | 1980 | 1985 | 5 years, 0 days |
| 2 | | K. G. MararK. G. Marar (b. 1934- d. 1995) | 1985 | 1990 | 5 years, 0 days |
| 2 | | K. G. MararK. G. Marar (b. 1934- d. 1995) | 1994 | 1995 | 1 year, 0 days |
| 3 | | K. Raman Pillai | 1990 | 1994 | 4 years, 0 days |
| 4 | | K. V. Sreedharan Master | 1995 | 1998 | 3 years, 0 days |
| 5 | | C. K. Padmanabhan (b. 1 January 1949) | 1998 | 2003 | 5 years, 0 days |
| 6 | | P. S. Sreedharan Pillai (b. 1 December 1954) | 2003 | 2006 | 3 years, 0 days |
| 6 | | P. S. Sreedharan Pillai (b. 1 December 1954) | 2018 | 2019 | 1 year, 0 days |
| 7 | | P. K. Krishna Das | 2006 | 2009 | 3 years, 0 days |
| 8 | | V. Muraleedharan (b. 12 December 1958) | 2009 | 2015 | 6 years, 0 days |
| 9 | | Kummanam Rajasekharan (b. 23 December 1952) | 2015 | 2018 | 3 years, 0 days |
| 10 | | K. Surendran (b. 10 March 1970) | 2 February 2020 | 23 March 2025 | 5 years, 49 days |
| 11 | | Rajeev Chandrasekhar (b. 31 May 1964) | 24 March 2025 | Incumbent | 1 year, 192 days |

== Electoral Performance : Lok Sabha Elections in Keralam ==
Over the years, the Bharatiya Janatha Party (BJP) has worked to expand its presence in Kerala's political landscape, particularly through its participation in Lok Sabha elections. Although the party won its first parliamentary seat in 2024, it has made notable inroads in several constituencies reflecting a gradual increase in public support. The table below outlines BJP's performance in various Lok Sabha elections in Kerala, highlighting its vote share, seats won, and outcome.

The Lok Sabha, also known as the House of the People, is the lower house of the bicameral Parliament of India, where the upper house is Rajya Sabha. Members of the Lok Sabha are elected by an adult universal suffrage and a first-past-the-post system to represent their respective constituencies, and they hold their seats for five years or until the body is dissolved by the president of India on the advice of the union council of ministers. The house meets in the Lok Sabha chamber of the Parliament House in New Delhi.

Lok Sabha Election Performance
| Election Year | Leader | Alliance | Seats | | | Popular vote | | | Sitting side |
| Election Year | Leader | Alliance | seats contested | seats won | +/- in seats | Votes | votes % | ±pp | Sitting side |
Janata Party
| 1980 | | | 3 | 0 / 20 | - | 5,22,321 | 6.7% | New entry | Others |
| 1984 (Note: Janata Party and Bharatiya Janata Party both fought the 1984 elections in Kerala as separate parties. JP was part of the UDF alliance whereas BJP fought as a Third Front.) | | | 1 | 1 / 20 | ▲1 | 2,32,339 | 2.1% | ▼4.6% | Others |
Bharatiya Janata Party
| 1984 (Note: Janata Party and Bharatiya Janata Party both fought the 1984 elections in Kerala as separate parties. JP was part of the UDF alliance whereas BJP fought as a Third Front.) | Atal Bihari Vajpayee | None | 19 | 0 / 20 | - | 1,91,120 | 1.8% | New | Others |
| 1989 | Lal Krishna Advani | None | 19 | 0 / 20 | - | 6,72,613 | 4.5% | ▲2.7% | Opposition |
| 1991 | Lal Krishna Advani | None | 19 | 0 / 20 | - | 6,56,945 | 4.6% | ▲0.1% | Opposition |
| 1996 | Atal Bihari Vajpayee | None | 18 | 0 / 20 | - | 8,07,607 | 5.6% | ▲1% | Opposition |
| 1998 | Atal Bihari Vajpayee | None | 20 | 0 / 20 | - | 11,92,046 | 8% | ▲2.4% | Government |
| 1999 | Atal Bihari Vajpayee | NDA | 14 | 0 / 20 | - | 10,08,047 | 6.6% | ▼1.4% | Government |
| 2004 | Lal Krishna Advani | NDA | 19 | 0 / 20 | - | 15,66,569 | 10.4% | ▲3.8% | Opposition |
| 2009 | Lal Krishna Advani | NDA | 19 | 0 / 20 | - | 10,11,563 | 6.3% | ▼4.1% | Opposition |
| 2014 | Narendra Modi | NDA | 18 | 0 / 20 | - | 18,56,750 | 10.5% | ▲4.2% | Government |
| 2019 | Narendra Modi | NDA | 15 | 0 / 20 | - | 26,35,810 | 13% | ▲2.5% | Government |
| 2024 | Narendra Modi | NDA | 16 | 1 / 20 | ▲1 | 32,96,354 | 16.8% | ▲3.8% | Government |

=== Elected Members to Lok Sabha election in Kerala ===
Members of the Lok Sabha
| S.No. | Portrait | Name | Election | Constituency | | Votes Received | Vote % | Vote Margin | Position Held | Prime Minister |
| S.No. | Portrait | Name | Election | No. | Name | Votes Received | Vote % | Vote Margin | Position Held | Prime Minister |
|---|---|---|---|---|---|---|---|---|---|---|
2024 Indian general election in Kerala
| 1. | | Suresh Gopi | 2024 | 10 | Thrissur | 4,12,338 | 37.80% | 74,686 | Ministry of Petroleum and Natural Gas; Ministry of Tourism (India) (MoS) | Narendra Modi III |

== Electoral Performance : Kerala Legislative Assembly Elections ==
The Bharatiya Janatha Party (BJP) has steadily expanded its efforts in Kerala's state politics, contesting Assembly elections with the goal of emerging as a signinficant political force. Despite the dominance of the CPI(M)-led LDF and the Congress-led UDF, the BJP marked a historic breakthrough in the 2016 Kerala Legislative Assembly Elections, when O. Rajagopal won from Nemom constituency, becoming the first BJP MLA in the state's history. While the party was unable to retain the seat in the 2021 elections, its growing vote share in key constituencies reflects an evolving support base and continued political relevance within Kerala's complex electoral landscape. In 2026 election, BJP created history by winning 3 seats in history. That allows BJP to get their Kerala State Govt sponsored Parliamentary party office in the Kerala Legislative Assembly for the first time ever.

| Year | Assembly | Leader | Seats contested | Seats won | (+/-) in seats | % of votes | Vote swing | Popular vote | Outcome |
|---|---|---|---|---|---|---|---|---|---|
| 1982 | 7th | | 69 | 0 / 140 | New entry | 2.75% | New entry | 2,63,331 | No seats |
| 1987 | 8th | | 116 | 0 / 140 | Steady | 5.56% | ▲2.81 | 7,08,261 | No seats |
| 1991 | 9th | | 137 | 0 / 140 | Steady | 4.76% | ▼0.80 | 6,74,525 | No seats |
| 1996 | 10th | | 127 | 0 / 140 | Steady | 5.48% | ▲0.72 | 7,81,090 | No seats |
| 2001 | 11th | | 123 | 0 / 140 | Steady | 5.02% | ▼0.46 | 7,89,764 | No seats |
| 2006 | 12th | | 136 | 0 / 140 | Steady | 4.75% | ▼0.27 | 7,38,244 | No seats |
| 2011 | 13th | | 138 | 0 / 140 | Steady | 6.03% | ▲1.28 | 10,53,654 | No seats |
| 2016 | 14th | | 98 | 1 / 140 | ▲1 | 10.53% | ▲4.50 | 21,29,726 | Others |
| 2021 | 15th | | 115 | 0 / 140 | ▼1 | 11.30% | ▲0.77 | 23,54,656 | No seats |
| 2026 | 16th | Rajeev Chandrasekhar | 98 | 3 / 140 | ▲3 | 11.49% | ▲0.19 | 24,66,178 | Others |

=== Elected Members to Kerala Legislative Assembly ===
==== Member of the Kerala Legislative Assembly ====
Member of the Kerala Legislative Assembly
| S.No. | Portrait | Name | Election | Constituency | | | Votes Received | Vote % | Vote Margin | Position Held | Remarks |
| S.No. | Portrait | Name | Election | District. | No. | Name | Votes Received | Vote % | Vote Margin | Position Held | Remarks |
|---|---|---|---|---|---|---|---|---|---|---|---|
2026 Kerala Legislative Assembly election
| 01. | | B. B. Gopakumar | 2026 | Kollam | 126 | Chathannoor | 51,923 | 38.04 | 4,398 | MLA | BJP Kerala Legislative Party Leader (BB Gopakumar) |
| 02. | | V. Muraleedharan | 2026 | Thiruvananthapuram | 132 | Kazhakootam | 46,564 | 35.39 | 428 | MLA | BJP Kerala Legislative Party Leader (BB Gopakumar) |
| 03. | | Rajeev Chandrasekhar | 2026 | Thiruvananthapuram | 135 | Nemom | 57,192 | 40.75 | 4,978 | MLA | BJP Kerala Legislative Party Leader (BB Gopakumar) |
2016 Kerala Legislative Assembly election
| 01. | | O. Rajagopal | 2016 | Thiruvananthapuram | 135 | Nemom | 67,813 | 47.46 | 8,671 | MLA | 2016-2021 |

== Electoral Performance : Local Body Elections ==
=== Kerala Local Body Elections Summary ===
| Year | Gram Panchayats | Block Panchayats | District Panchayats | Municipalities | Corporations | Total |
|---|---|---|---|---|---|---|
| 2015 | 14 / 941 - (0) | 0 / 152 - (0) | 0 / 14 - (0) | 1 / 87 - (0) | 0 / 6 - (0) | 15 / 1,200 - (0) |
| 2020 | 19 / 941 ▲ (+5) | 0 / 152 - (0) | 0 / 14 - (0) | 2 / 87 ▲ (+1) | 0 / 6 - (0) | 21 / 1,200 ▲ (+6) |
| 2025 | 26 / 941 ▲ (+7) | 0 / 152 - (0) | 0 / 14 - (0) | 2 / 86 - (0) | 1 / 6 ▲ (+1) | 29 / 1,200 ▲ (+8) |

2025 Election Summary:

- NDA’s Gram Panchayat victories are spread across eight districts, with the strongest clusters in Thiruvanathapuram (6), Kollam (2), Pathanamthitta (4), Alappuzha (5), Kottayam (3), Thrissur (1), Palakkad (2), and Kasaragod (3). The wins are geographically diverse, covering southern, central, and northern Kerala, reflecting steady grassroots expansion in both rural and semi-urban belts.
- Palakkad Municipality retained by NDA for a third term (though without an outright majority this time), highlighting localized organizational strength.
- Thrippunithura Municipality won by NDA from UDF, marking a significant gain.
- BJP formerly ruled Pandalam Municipality in Pathanamthitta district from 2020 to 2025.

=== Municipal Corporation Elections ===
| Year | Municipal Corporation | Seats won | Change in seats | Government |
Kannur district
| 2015 | Kannur Municipal Corporation | 0 / 55 | Steady | None |
| 2020 | Kannur Municipal Corporation | 1 / 55 | ▲1 | Others |
| 2025 | Kannur Municipal Corporation | 4 / 56 | ▲3 | Others |
Ernakulam district
| 2015 | Kochi Municipal Corporation | 2 / 74 | Steady | Others |
| 2020 | Kochi Municipal Corporation | 5 / 74 | ▲3 | Others |
| 2025 | Kochi Municipal Corporation | 6 / 76 | ▲1 | Others |
Kollam district
| 2015 | Kollam Municipal Corporation | 2 / 55 | | Others |
| 2020 | Kollam Municipal Corporation | 6 / 55 | ▲4 | Others |
| 2025 | Kollam Municipal Corporation | 12 / 56 | ▲6 | Others |
Kozhikode district
| 2015 | Kozhikode Municipal Corporation | 7 / 75 | Steady | Others |
| 2020 | Kozhikode Municipal Corporation | 7 / 75 | Steady | Others |
| 2025 | Kozhikode Municipal Corporation | 13 / 76 | ▲6 | Others |
Thrissur district
| 2015 | Thrissur Municipal Corporation | 6 / 55 | Steady | Others |
| 2020 | Thrissur Municipal Corporation | 6 / 55 | Steady | Others |
| 2025 | Thrissur Municipal Corporation | 8 / 56 | ▲2 | Others |
Thiruvananthapuram district
| 2015 | Thiruvananthapuram Municipal Corporation | 35 / 100 | Steady | Opposition |
| 2020 | Thiruvananthapuram Municipal Corporation | 35 / 100 | Steady | Opposition |
| 2025 | Thiruvananthapuram Municipal Corporation | 50 / 101 | ▲15 | Government |

- In the local body elections of 2025 in Kerala, the Bharatiya Janata Party–led National Democratic Alliance (NDA) secured 50 seats in the Thiruvananthapuram Municipal Corporation, emerging as the single largest political front and displacing the Left Democratic Front (LDF) from control after several decades. BJP has created history by winning its first-ever municipal corporation in Kerala. The outcome was widely interpreted by political observers as a notable development for the BJP in Kerala, a state where the party has traditionally had limited electoral success. Analysts commented that the result signalled a shift in the political dynamics of the state’s urban centres. Following the elections, the BJP projected R. Sreelekha, a former Indian Police Service officer, as its mayoral candidate, with party leaders emphasising her administrative experience and governance credentials.

== List of mayors ==
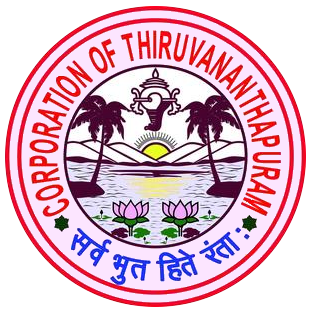
| No. | Portrait | Name (Birth–Death) | Mayor/ Deputy Mayor | Party | Term in office | | |
| No. | Portrait | Name (Birth–Death) | Mayor/ Deputy Mayor | Party | Assumed office | Left office | Time in office |
Thiruvananthapuram Municipal Corporation 2025
| 1 | V. V. Rajesh | V. V. Rajesh' (b. 1975) | Mayor of Thiruvananthapuram | Bharatiya Janata Party | 26 December 2025 | Incumbent | 280 days |
| 2 | | Asha Nath G. S. | Deputy Mayor | Bharatiya Janata Party | 26 December 2025 | Incumbent | 280 days |

== Current members ==
The 51 BJP Councilors of the Thiruvananthapuram Municipal Corporation are listed below in the serial wise order.

Mayor: V. V. Rajesh
Deputy Mayor: Asha Nath G. S.
| Assembly | Ward Details | | Councillor | Party | Alliance | Remarks |
| Assembly | No. | Name | Councillor | Party | Alliance | Remarks |
|---|---|---|---|---|---|---|
| Kazhakootam | 1 | Sainik School | V. Sudevan Nair | Bharatiya Janata Party | NDA | |
| Kazhakootam | 2 | Chanthavila | Anu G Prabha | Bharatiya Janata Party | NDA | |
| Kazhakootam | 3 | Njandoorkonam | A. Pradeep Kumar | Bharatiya Janata Party | NDA | |
| Kazhakootam | 4 | Powdikonam | Deepu Raj | Bharatiya Janata Party | NDA | |
| Kazhakootam | 5 | Chenkottukonam | Archana Manikandan | Bharatiya Janata Party | NDA | |
| Kazhakootam | 6 | Kariavattom | S.S. Sandhyarani | Bharatiya Janata Party | NDA | |
| Kazhakootam | 7 | Mannanthala | Chempazhanthy Udayan | Bharatiya Janata Party | NDA | |
| Vattiyoorkavu | 8 | Ambalamukku | Kumari Jayanthi R.C. | Bharatiya Janata Party | NDA | |
| Vattiyoorkavu | 9 | Thuruthummoola | V. Vijayakumar | Bharatiya Janata Party | NDA | |
| Vattiyoorkavu | 10 | Nettayam | Yamuna R.S. | Bharatiya Janata Party | NDA | |
| Vattiyoorkavu | 11 | Vazhottukonam | Sugathan R. | Bharatiya Janata Party | NDA | |
| Vattiyoorkavu | 12 | Kodunganoor | V. V. Rajesh | Bharatiya Janata Party | NDA | Mayor |
| Vattiyoorkavu | 13 | Vattiyoorkavu | Adv.Nanda Bhargav | Bharatiya Janata Party | NDA | |
| Vattiyoorkavu | 14 | Kanjirampara | Sumi Balu | Bharatiya Janata Party | NDA | |
| Vattiyoorkavu | 15 | Chettivilakam | R. Dinesh Kumar | Bharatiya Janata Party | NDA | |
| Kazhakootam | 16 | Edavacode | Swathi S. Kumar | Bharatiya Janata Party | NDA | |
| Vattiyoorkavu | 17 | Sasthamangalam | R. Sreelekha | Bharatiya Janata Party | NDA | |
| Vattiyoorkavu | 18 | Pangode | Vishnu Mohan M. | Bharatiya Janata Party | NDA | |
| Nemom | 19 | Thirumala | P.S. Devima | Bharatiya Janata Party | NDA | |
| Nemom | 20 | Poojappura | Rajalakshmi T. | Bharatiya Janata Party | NDA | |
| Vattiyoorkavu | 21 | Valiyavila | Adv.V.G. Girikumar | Bharatiya Janata Party | NDA | |
| Thiruvananthapuram | 22 | Jagathy | P.T. Madhu | Bharatiya Janata Party | NDA | |
| Thiruvananthapuram | 23 | Valiyasala | Surya V.S. | Bharatiya Janata Party | NDA | |
| Nemom | 24 | Estate | R. Abhilash | Bharatiya Janata Party | NDA | |
| Nemom | 25 | Nemom | M. R. Gopan | Bharatiya Janata Party | NDA | |
| Nemom | 26 | Ponnumangalam | Sridevi S. K. | Bharatiya Janata Party | NDA | |
| Nemom | 27 | Melamcode | Pappanamcode Saji | Bharatiya Janata Party | NDA | |
| Nemom | 28 | Pappanamcode | Niramankara Hari | Bharatiya Janata Party | NDA | |
| Nemom | 29 | Karamana | Karamana Ajith | Bharatiya Janata Party | NDA | |
| Nemom | 30 | Nedumcaud | R. C. Beena | Bharatiya Janata Party | NDA | |
| Nemom | 31 | Kaladi | Manju G. S. | Bharatiya Janata Party | NDA | |
| Nemom | 32 | Karumom | Ashanath G. S. | Bharatiya Janata Party | NDA | Deputy Mayor |
| Nemom | 33 | Poonkulam | Vayalkkara Ratheesh | Bharatiya Janata Party | NDA | |
| Nemom | 34 | Vellar | Sathyavathi V. | Bharatiya Janata Party | NDA | |
| Nemom | 35 | Thiruvallam | Pachalloor Gopakumar | Bharatiya Janata Party | NDA | |
| Nemom | 36 | Ambalathara | Simi Jyotish | Bharatiya Janata Party | NDA | |
| Nemom | 37 | Attukal | Srruthy S. S. | Bharatiya Janata Party | NDA | |
| Nemom | 38 | Kamaleswaram | Giri V. | Bharatiya Janata Party | NDA | |
| Thiruvananthapuram | 39 | Sreevaraham | Mini R. | Bharatiya Janata Party | NDA | |
| Thiruvananthapuram | 40 | Manacaud | Saritha P. | Bharatiya Janata Party | NDA | |
| Thiruvananthapuram | 41 | Chalai | S. K. P. Ramesh | Bharatiya Janata Party | NDA | |
| Thiruvananthapuram | 42 | Fort | Harikumar S. | Bharatiya Janata Party | NDA | |
| Thiruvananthapuram | 43 | Perunthanni | Deepa S. Nair | Bharatiya Janata Party | NDA | |
| Thiruvananthapuram | 44 | Sreekanteswaram | Sukanya O. | Bharatiya Janata Party | NDA | |
| Vattiyoorkavu | 45 | Kannammoola | P. Radhakrishnan (Note: Extended support to BJP led NDA.) | Independent | NDA | |
| Kazhakootam | 46 | Kadakampally | Jaya Rajeev | Bharatiya Janata Party | NDA | |
| Kazhakootam | 47 | Akkulam | Adv.Mini P. S. | Bharatiya Janata Party | NDA | |
| Kazhakootam | 48 | Cheruvaikkal | Vinod R. | Bharatiya Janata Party | NDA | |
| Kazhakootam | 49 | Alathara | K. P. Bindu | Bharatiya Janata Party | NDA | |
| Kazhakootam | 50 | Kuzhivila | B. Rajendran | Bharatiya Janata Party | NDA | |
| Kazhakootam | 51 | Attipra | Sunil S. S. | Bharatiya Janata Party | NDA | |

== National Democratic Alliance (NDA) in Kerala ==
Bharatiya Janata Party – Kerala is a constituent of the National Democratic Alliance (NDA), a centre-right political coalition in India led by the Bharatiya Janata Party (BJP) at the national level. The NDA was founded on 15 May 1998 and currently forms the Government of India under the leadership of the BJP.

In Kerala, political power has traditionally been dominated by the Left Democratic Front (LDF) and the United Democratic Front (UDF), with the NDA being a smaller third front in the state’s electoral landscape. As part of the NDA front in Kerala, the BJP has cultivated alliances with regional parties to expand its electoral footprint and contest elections (both state assembly and local bodies) in collaboration:

- Bharatiya Janata Party (BJP) is the principal constituent of the National Democratic Alliance (NDA) in Kerala. As the Kerala state unit of the BJP, it leads the coalition’s political strategy in the state and collaborates with regional partners to contest elections and expand its presence in a state historically dominated by the Left Democratic Front (LDF) and the United Democratic Front (UDF).
- Twenty 20 is a regional political party in Kerala founded by industrialist Sabu M. Jacob and backed by the KITEX Group. It formally joined the BJP-led National Democratic Alliance ahead of the 2026 Kerala Assembly elections, bringing its local body electoral strengths, particularly in panchayats such as Kizhakkambalam, into the NDA fold and aiming to boost the alliance’s political footprint.
- Bharath Dharma Jana Sena (BDJS) is a regional party in Kerala established in December 2015 by leaders associated with the Sree Narayana Dharma Paripalana Yogam (SNDP). It is a constituent member of the NDA in Kerala, functioning as an allied formation to the BJP and contributing to the coalition’s efforts to broaden its electoral base in the state.
- Kerala Kamaraj Congress (KKC) is a state political party founded in October 2016 and aligned with the National Democratic Alliance in Kerala. Led by Vishnupuram Chandrasekharan, KKC has participated in elections under the NDA banner and maintained its association with the coalition while contesting local constituencies.

Other than these above,there are around other 10 more smaller parties & some social religious caste organizations in the NDA Kerala alliance.

== BJP Central Ministers & Governers from Kerala ==
Central Ministers :

- O. Rajagopal
- Alphonse Kannanthanam
- V. Muralidharan
- Suresh Gopi
- Rajeev Chandrasekhar
- George Kurian

Governers :

- P. S. Sreedharan Pillai
- Kummanam Rajasekharan
- C. V. Anandabose

== See also ==
- Bharatiya Janata Party
- National Democratic Alliance
- State units of the Bharatiya Janata Party
- Communist Party of India (Marxist), Kerala
- Kerala Pradesh Congress Committee
