= Peroor Sree Krishna Swamy Temple =

Religion
- Affiliation: Hinduism
- District: Thiruvananthapuram
- Deity: Sree Krishna Swamy
- Festivals: 10 Days Annual Festival, Sree Krishna Jayanthi
- Governing body: Travancore Devaswom Board

Location
- State: Kerala
- Country: India

Architecture
- Type: Dravidian Architecture

Peroor Sree Krishna Swamy Temple is a Hindu Temple situated near Ambalamukku in Thiruvananthapuram. The temple is dedicated to Krishna and is administered by Travancore Devaswom Board. The town of Peroorkada derives its name from the temple. The temple is also called Thekkan (southern) Guruvayoor.

== Deities ==
The main deity is Krishna. Sub-deities include Ganapathi, Shiva, Bhagavathy, Ayyappan, Muruga, Nagas and Navagrahas.

== Festivals ==
The annual festival continues for ten days. It begins by hoisting the flag on the golden flagstaff on Thiruvonam Star day in the Malayalam month of Meenam and finishes by Aarattu on the tenth day. The Aarattu ritual is held on Sasthamangalam Mahadevar Temple premises; in the evening, a procession commences from the temple. The procession goes along Peroorkada, Paipinmoodu Jn, Kadappathala Nagar, Kowdiar, Ambalamukku Jn, and back to the temple.

Krishna Jayanthi, Mandala and Makara Vilakku season are also celebrated.

== Main offerings ==
Payasam, Paalpayasam (sweetened milk porridge), Archana, Pushpanjali, (flower offerings), Neeranjanam, Muzhukappu, Ganapathi Homam, Bhagavathy Homam and many more offerings are made. Annadanam (feast) is performed during festival days.
