= Balasangam =

Indian children's organisation wing

Balasangam is an Indian children's organization wing of the Communist Party of India (Marxist) (CPIM). It has about a million members in about 20,000 units across Kerala. Balasangham is the largest children's groups in Kerala, and its kalajatha Venalthumbikal is the biggest children's theater in Asia. The first Balasangham started its operations on 28 December 1938, at Kalliasseri of Chiraykkal panchayath in Kannur. E.K. Nayanar was the first president of Balasangham. First state conference was held at Kottayam and second at Pilicode, Kasaragod. The third state conference was held in October 2014 in Palakkad. The fourth state conference was held in December 2016 in Perinthalmanna in Malappuram. Fifth state conference was held at Adoor, Pathanamthitta.Sixth State Conference was held in October 2022 in Thrissur.

Currently, its office bearers are:

- President: PRAVISHA PRAMOD
- Secretary: D S SANDEEP
- Convenor: M Prakashan Master, Ex.MLA
- Co-ordinator: Vishnu Jayan
- www.balasangham.com

== Notable Figures ==
- M Vijin, the former state secretary of Balasangam, currently he is the MLA from Kalliasseri Assembly Constituency.
- VP Sanu, the former Balasangam leader and he was the former All India President of Students' Federation of India.
- Arya Rajendran Former President of Balasangam and former Mayor of Thiruvananthapuram Corporation.

== Activities ==
- Venal Thumbi Kalajadha (Children's Theater)
