= Trivandrum Engineering Science and Technology Research Park =

Indian research science park

TrEST Research Park
- Trivandrum Engineering Science and Technology Research Park
- Abbreviation: TrEST
- Formation: 2015
- Headquarters: Trivandrum
- Location: Thiruvananthapuram, India
- Owner: Government of Kerala
- Affiliations: College of Engineering, Trivandrum and APJ Abdul Kalam Technological University
- Website: trestpark.org

The Trivandrum Engineering Science and Technology Research Park (TrEST), commonly known as TrEST Research Park is the first technology research science park in Kerala and is founded by the Government of Kerala. It is a concentration of collaborative research in microprocessor design, electric vehicle research, and other emerging technologies and has strong links with College of Engineering, Trivandrum and APJ Abdul Kalam Technological University.

The science park is currently situated about 11 km to the north of Thiruvananthapuram city centre, in the College of Engineering Trivandrum (CET) campus. The park will be moved to a 50-acre campus at Vilappilsala, adjacent to the APJ Abdul Kalam Technological University campus.

== Project Overview ==
The EV Industrial and Research Park is proposed to be established Trivandrum dedicated to the EV Park itself. The project follows a hub-and-spoke model to allow future expansion

The park will host:

Research and development centers

Testing and prototyping facilities

Manufacturing units for batteries, motors, power electronics, and all EV components

Common facilities accessible on a fee basis for startups and small enterprises
