= Sreelekha =

Sreelekha is an Indian given name. Notable people with the name include:

- Sreelekha Mitra (born 1971), Indian Bengali film and television actress
- Sreelekha Mukherji, Indian Bengali actress
- R. Sreelekha (born 1960), Indian police officer
