= List of the youngest mayors in India =

Youngest mayors in India

This is a list of the youngest mayors in India. This list is inclusive of individuals nearest to the age of majority at the time of their election; usually under the age of 30.

== Youngest mayors ==
Name	Municipal Corporation	State	Age at appointment	Population	Tenure	Political Party	Notes
Arya Rajendran	Thiruvananthapuram Corporation	Kerala	21	957,730	2020–2025	Communist Party of India (Marxist)	She is the youngest mayor in the country. She served as the mayor of the capital of Kerala.
Sabitha Beegam	Kollam Municipal Corporation	Kerala	23	397,419	2000–2004	Communist Party of India (Marxist)	She was the youngest mayor in the country till the election of Arya Rajendran.
Sanjeev Naik	Navi Mumbai Municipal Corporation	Maharashtra	23	318,000	1995–2009	Nationalist Congress Party	Naik was the first mayor of the Navi Mumbai satellite city.
Saroja Cherian Polasapalli	Kakinada Municipal Corporation	Andhra Pradesh	24	312,538	2005–2010	Indian National Congress	She is the first and youngest mayor of Kakinada.
Rekha Priyadarshini	Salem City Municipal Corporation	Tamil Nadu	24	829,267	2006–2010	Dravida Munnetra Kazhagam	She was the first woman mayor from the Scheduled Caste community.
Panchumarthi Anuradha	Vijayawada Municipal Corporation	Andhra Pradesh	26	1,723,000	2000–2005	Telugu Desam Party	Youngest mayor at the age of 26 in the year 2000.
Mekala Kavya	Jawaharnagar Municipal Corporation	Telangana	26	48,216	Incumbent, since 2019	Bharat Rashtra Samithi	She is the first mayor of Jawaharnagar in Medchal.
Padamjeet Singh Mehta	Bathinda Municipal Corporation	Punjab	26	415,000	Incumbent, since 2025	Aam Aadmi Party	He is the first Mayor of Bathinda and only councilor from Aam Aadmi Party.
Narayan Prasad Shukla	Indore Municipal Corporation	Madhya Pradesh	27	2,950,000	1962-1965	Indian National Congress	Narayan Prasad Shukla was among the youngest mayors in India at the time of his election, having assumed office as Mayor of Indore at the age of 27. This distinction places him among the earliest young municipal leaders in the country, a record that was later surpassed by Sabitha Begum in India’s mayoral history.
Devendra Fadnavis	Nagpur Municipal Corporation	Maharashtra	27	82,000	1997–1999	Bharatiya Janata Party	Fadnavis was among the youngest mayors in India at the time of his election, a distinction that was later surpassed by Sabitha Begum. A similar distinction is shared by Narayan Prasad Shukla, who became Mayor of Indore at the age of 27, placing him among the youngest mayors in the country’s municipal history.
Tasneem Bano	Mysore City Corporation	Karnataka	31	893,062	2020–2022	Janata Dal (Secular)	She is the first Muslim mayor of Mysore.
Nutan Rathore	Firozabad Municipal Corporation	Uttar Pradesh	31	604,214	Incumbent, since 2017	Bharatiya Janata Party	She's the youngest mayor in Uttar Pradesh.

Before the independence of India, Subhas Chandra Bose was elected as the fifth mayor of Kolkata on August 22, 1930, at the age of 27.
