= List of statues in Thiruvananthapuram =

Thiruvananthapuram, the capital of Kerala, is known as the "City of Statues". There are over 50 statues in the city, depicting a wide range of people, from historical figures to cultural icons. The statues are found in all parts of the city, from public parks to busy streets.

The oldest statue in Thiruvananthapuram is the statue of T Madhava Rao, which was erected in 1894. The statue is located in the heart of the city, near the Secretariat. Other notable statues in the city include the statue of Mahatma Gandhi, the statue of Jawaharlal Nehru, and the statue of Sree Narayana Guru.

Statues in Thiruvananthapuram

Number	Statue	Image	Sculptor	Location	Notes	Coordinates
1	MN Govindan Nair			Pattom		8.518747957698372°N 76.94212421685947°E
2	Subhash Chandra Bose					
3	Subhash Chandra Bose			PMG		8.50849467472122°N 76.95010187646409°E
4	R Shanker			Fine Arts College		8.505360146125131°N 76.95138341721°E
	Memoriam of Men of The Indian Army			Fine Arts College		8.505608535511918°N 76.95139852407473°E
5	M. Visvesvaraya			The Institution of Engineers		8.509379898708973°N 76.95829422238907°E
6	C Kesavan			Museum PS		8.508767289449981°N 76.95642270235017°E
7	Chithira Thirunal			Devaswom Board Jn.		8.517741863682502°N 76.95660575707967°E
8	K Karunakaran			Kanakakkunnu		8.50949148246651°N 76.95711217683998°E
9	Swami Vivekananda			Kowdiar Park		8.522294392754018°N 76.96104746280243°E
10	Accamma Cheriyan			Accamma Cheriyan Park, Keston Road		8.513505605133895°N 76.96152060178991°E
11	Vayalar Ramavarma			Manaveeyam Road		8.510188086939188°N 76.96057084294591°E
12	G. Devarajan			Manaveeyam Road, Althara Junction		8.50836144116638°N 76.96209013249462°E
13	Ayyankali			Vellayambalam	1980, Inaguraged by then Prime Minister Indira Gandhi	8.51146085958423°N 76.96246209833905°E
14	KPP Nambiar			KELTRON Campus, Vellayambalam		8.510230863709825°N 76.96165422175791°E
15	P Bhaskaran			Manaveeyam Road, Althara Junction		8.508192219429807°N 76.96210214670427°E
16	Ulloor S. Parameswara Iyer			State Central Library		8.506542493332411°N 76.95204419659912°E
17	Rabindranath Tagore			Fine Arts College Campus		
18	Swadeshabhimani Ramakrishna Pillai			Palayam		8.506542493332411°N 76.95204419659912°E
19	Sree Narayana Guru			SN Park, Opposite Museum Police Station		8.508976513485353°N 76.95687488226866°E
20	Kesari A Balakrishna Pillai			Pulimoodu Junction		8.494800400345632°N 76.94785239790794°E
21	Dhanwanthari			Ayurveda College		8.491804547577933°N 76.94695298237892°E
22	Rajiv Gandhi			Chenkalchoola		8.495891981260765°N 76.95281822583293°E
23	TM Varghese			Kesavadasapuram roundabout		8.529915494770915°N 76.93850575432239°E
24	Chithira Thirunal			Kerala University Campus		8.503468456725633°N 76.94785049548969°E
25	T Madhava Rao			Statue Junction	1894, Inaugurated by Keralavarma Valiyakoyi Thampuran.	8.497810765647674°N 76.94839389151912°E
26	Veluthampi Dalawa			Secretariat Campus		8.497757487929166°N 76.94871023029643°E
27	Mahathma Gandhi			Gandhi Park, Kizhakkekotta		8.482628300676744°N 76.9479804849277°E
28	Sethu Parvathi Bhai (Removed)				Installed in ME 1117 Thulam 6	
29	Ponnara Sreedhar			Infront of Railwaystation, Thampanoor		8.487369113358541°N 76.95289488486554°E
30	Kumaranasan			Ashan Square, Infront of Kerala University, Palayam		8.50349965759183°N 76.9485090603579°E
31	Mahathma Gandhi			Niyamasabha		8.506811404015776°N 76.94993436071785°E
32	BR. Ambedkar			Niyamasabha		
33	Jawaharlal Nehru			Niyamasabha		
34	EMS Namboothiripad			EMS Park, Niyamasabha		8.506562767120156°N 76.9505570396936°E
35	AK. Gopalan			AKG Park, Pottakkuzhy		8.514989978456821°N 76.93727634244993°E
36	Dr. Palpu			Pettah		
37	Annie Mascrene			Annie Mascrene square, Infront of Women's College, Vazhuthakkadu		8.498500946746352°N 76.9574388218128°E
38	AR Rajaraja varma			University College campus		
39	Lal Bahadur Sastri			Panavila Junction		8.497282180269268°N 76.9552322565974°E
40	Colachel Victory Warrior			Pangode Military Station	Unveiled in 2023 July by Governor Arif Mohammed Khan	
