= Arya Rajendran =

Indian (born 1998)

46th Mayor of Thiruvananthapuram Municipal Corporation
- In office 28 December 2020 – 20 December 2025
- Preceded by: K. Sreekumar
- Succeeded by: V. V. Rajesh

State President Balasangam, Kerala

Personal details
- Born: 12 January 1999 (age 27) Thiruvananthapuram, Kerala, India
- Party: Communist Party of India (Marxist)
- Spouse: K. M. Sachin Dev (m. 2022)
- Parents: Rajendran; Sreelatha
- Education: All Saints College, Thiruvananthapuram

Arya Rajendran S. (born 12 January 1999) is an Indian politician who was the 46th Mayor of the Thiruvananthapuram Corporation from 2020 to 2025. She was elected from Mudavanmugal ward, belonging to Nemom Assembly Constituency from Communist Party of India (Marxist) at the age of 21 and was appointed as the mayor of the corporation which made her the youngest mayor in the country.

== Early life ==
Arya is the daughter of Rajendran, an electrician, and Sreelatha, an LIC agent. She studied at the Carmel Girls' School in Thiruvananthapuram and did her B.Sc. in Mathematics at All Saints College, Thiruvananthapuram.

Arya is married to K. M. Sachin Dev, who was the member of the Kerala Legislative Assembly from the Balussery constituency. The couple has a daughter named Dua Dev.

== Politics ==
Arya Rajendran was the state president of Bala Sangham, the Kerala's largest children's organisation. She was also a state committee member of Students' Federation of India and also serves as CPI(M)'s area committee member at Chala. In 2024, Arya Rajendran was elected to the CPIM Thiruvananthapuram District Committee

She was the candidate of Communist Party of India (Marxist) from Mudavanmugal ward in Thiruvananthapuram Corporation, the youngest candidate in 2020 civic body elections at the district. She defeated the UDF candidate Sreekala by 2872 votes.

Arya broke the record of Sabitha Beegum who became Kollam Mayor at 23 and Devendra Fadnavis by being the youngest mayor in India. Fadnavis became the mayor of Nagpur Municipal Corporation at the age of 27.

Her Mayorship of Thiruvananthapuram corporation from 2020 to 2025 have been criticied by many due to lack of experience, poor decision making skills and abuse of power. Many party members and left supporters blamed her as the main reason for CPI(M) losing the corporation after 45 years of continuous rule.

== Controversies ==
During her tenure as Mayor of Thiruvananthapuram, Arya Rajendran was involved in several public controversies that attracted political and media attention.

In August 2022, Arya Rajendran faced criticism following a proposal related to the formation of sports teams under the Thiruvananthapuram Corporation that was perceived as being organised along caste lines. The announcement led to backlash from opposition parties and sections of the public, who argued that such an initiative conflicted with constitutional principles of equality. Subsequently, the corporation clarified that sports activities would remain inclusive and not segregated on the basis of caste.

In November 2022, a political controversy arose after a letter allegedly written by Arya Rajendran recommending the engagement of party workers for temporary jobs in the municipal corporation became public. Opposition parties accused the mayor of attempting to influence appointments and demanded her resignation. The ruling CPI(M) responded by stating that the letter was either misrepresented or taken out of context and denied any irregular appointments. The issue led to protests and debates in the Kerala Legislative Assembly.

In March 2023, Arya Rajendran was criticised over the Thiruvananthapuram Corporation’s decision to restrict Pongala cooking on public roads and footpaths during the Attukal Pongala festival, citing safety, traffic management, and disaster prevention concerns. The move drew objections from opposition parties and sections of devotees, who viewed it as an unnecessary administrative intervention in a traditional religious practice. The corporation later clarified that the restrictions were limited to specific high-risk zones and that the festival itself was not being curtailed.

In April 2024, Arya Rajendran and her husband, MLA Sachin Dev, were involved in a road-related altercation with a Kerala State Road Transport Corporation (KSRTC) bus driver in Thiruvananthapuram. Arya alleged that the driver behaved inappropriately, while the driver accused the couple of blocking the bus and issuing threats. Police registered cases based on complaints from both parties, and the incident sparked public debate on the conduct of elected representatives.

Arya Rajendran has also been the subject of frequent online criticism and political satire, much of which focused on her age, administrative decisions, and leadership style. Supporters have described some of these attacks as age- and gender-based targeting, while critics argue that public scrutiny of elected officials is an integral part of democratic accountability.
