= Ponnara Sreedhar =

Indian politician

Sreedhar G. Ponnara

Member of the Kerala Legislative Assembly
- In office 1957–1964
- Constituency: Vilappil

Personal details
- Born: September 1899
- Died: 27 February 1966 (aged 66)

Sreedhar G. Ponnara, popularly known as Ponnara Sreedhar, (September 1898 – 27 February 1966) was an Indian politician and freedom fighter. He represented Vilappil constituency in the first Kerala Legislative Assembly, which was elected in the 1957 Kerala Legislative Assembly election. Sreedhar was a lawyer with a B.A. and B.L. Before becoming a member of the Kerala Legislature, he was elected unopposed in the Travancore Legislative Assembly in 1948 from Nedumangad constituency and from 1949 to 1956 in the Tirukochi Legislative Assembly.

== Life ==
Ponnara Sreedhar was an active participant in the Indian freedom struggle. He was a participant in many movements including Non-Cooperation Movement of 1922, Foreign Garment Boycott, Nagpur Satyagraha, Vaikom Satyagraha and Uppu Satyagraha. He was jailed several times. Sreedhar was a member of the Travancore State Congress and the KPCC. In 1923, he participated in the Delhi Congress. He is known for forming the Samasta Travancore Youth League in 1933, which was an organization of progressive minds. In 1956 he was elected as the Mayor of Thiruvananthapuram Corporation. Sreedhar died on 27 February 1966 in Thiruvananthapuram.

== Legacy ==
Ponnara Park is named after Ponnara Sreedhar. It is situated near Thampanoor railway station and has a statue of him.
