= V. V. Rajesh =

Indian politician and Mayor of Thiruvananthapuram

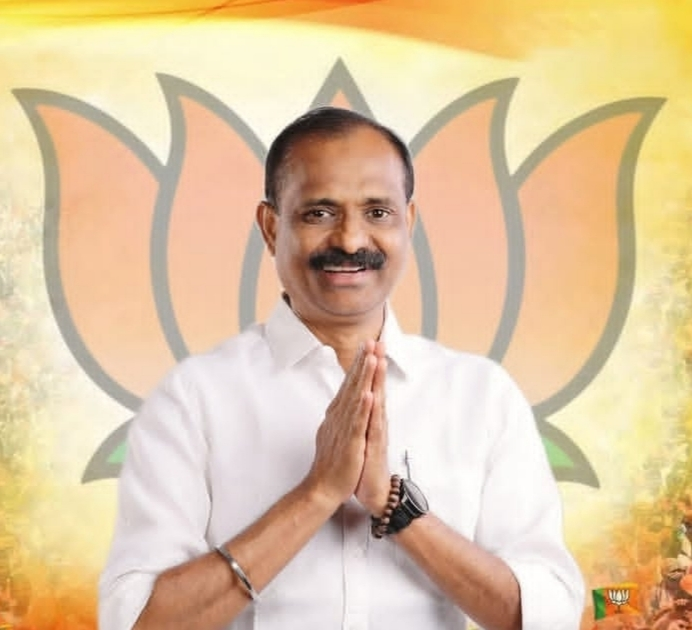

47th Mayor of Thiruvananthapuram
- Incumbent
- Assumed office 26 December 2025
- Preceded by: Arya Rajendran

State Secretary Bharatiya Janata Party, Kerala
- Incumbent
- Assumed office 11 July 2025
- State President: Rajeev Chandrasekhar

Personal details
- Born: V. V. Rajesh; 5 May 1975 (age 51) Nedumangad, Thiruvananthapuram, Kerala
- Party: Bharatiya Janata Party
- Parent: Velayudhan Nair (father)

V. Velayudhan Nair Rajesh (born 5 May 1975) is an Indian politician from Kerala and a leader of the Bharatiya Janata Party (BJP). He became the 47th mayor of the Thiruvananthapuram Municipal Corporation the state capital city of Keralam on 26 December 2025. He is the first BJP leader to become mayor of Thiruvananthapuram and the party's first mayor of a municipal corporation in Kerala.

== Early life ==
Rajesh was born on 5 May 1975 at Nedumangad in the Thiruvananthapuram district of Kerala. His father is Velayudhan Nair. After his education at Mar Ivanios College and Mahatma Gandhi College in Thiruvananthapuram, he did his LL.B. at the Kerala Law Academy, Thiruvananthapuram. He was a member of A.B.V.P. during his studies.

== Political career ==
Rajesh is a senior leader of the Bharatiya Janata Party in Kerala. Before becoming mayor, he held leadership roles at the district and state levels. He was the party's Thiruvananthapuram district president and the state secretary. He is a senior leader of the party in the state's capital city.

=== 2025 municipal corporation election ===
In the 2025 local body elections held on 9 December 2025, the Bharatiya Janata Party emerged as the single largest party in the Thiruvananthapuram Municipal Corporation by winning 50 of the 101 wards.

Following the election, Rajesh was nominated as the BJP's candidate for the mayoral post. He was elected mayor on 26 December 2025 after securing 51 votes, including the support of an independent councillor.

== Mayor of Thiruvananthapuram ==
Rajesh was sworn in as mayor of the Thiruvananthapuram Municipal Corporation on 26 December 2025. In his inaugural address, he stated that his administration would focus on inclusive development and civic improvements across all wards of the city.

== See also ==
- Thiruvananthapuram Municipal Corporation
- Bharatiya Janata Party
