= Sasthamangalam Mahadevar Temple =

- Mahadevar Temple, Sasthamangalam, Thiruvananthapuram, Kerala

Religion
- Affiliation: Hinduism
- District: Thiruvananthapuram
- Deity: Shiva (Mahadevar)
- Festivals: 10 Days Annual Festival, Shivarathri, Mandala-Makara vilakku

Location
- Location: Sasthamangalam
- State: Kerala
- Country: India
- Interactive map of Sasthamangalam Mahadevar Temple
- Coordinates: 8°31′06.7″N 76°58′25.4″E

Architecture
- Type: Kerala Temple Architecture

Specifications
- Temple: One
- Elevation: 47.77 m (157 ft)

The Sasthamangalam Mahadevar Temple is a Hindu temple in the Sasthamangalam ward of Thiruvananthapuram Municipal Corporation, Thiruvananthapuram, Kerala, India. It is located on top of a hill away from the city centre to promote the spiritual tranquility of the shrine. The temple is more than 700 years old according to the available records, and was regularly visited by the Kings of Travancore. It is administered by the Travancore Devaswom Board.

== Foundation legend ==
As per legend, when the site of the temple was still grassland, a woman cutting grass sharpened her knife on a rock lying on the ground, and the rock bled. She discovered that the rock was a shiva lingam and it was consecrated. The temple was constructed round the spot in due course.

== Deities and sub-deities ==
The main deity is Shiva as Uma Maheshwara (Shiva with his consort Parvati). Even though there is no icon of Parvati, she is believed to be present, as stated in an ancient poem which is recited in this temple.

The sub-deities are Ganapathi (Ganesha), Murugan (Kartikeya) and Dharma Sastha (Ayyappan). Outside the temple compound on the banks of Killi River, icons of Bhadrakali and Veerabhadra, Nagaraja and Nagayakshi are consecrated.

== Festivals ==
The annual temple festival lasts for ten days, commencing on the Thiruvathira star day with the hoisting of a flag on the golden flagstaff in the Malayalam month of Dhanu and ending with the Aarattu ceremony on the tenth day (in December–January according to the western calendar).

The days of Pradosham, Shivrathri, Makara Vilakku are considered sacred for worship at this temple.

== Offerings ==
Offerings are made by devotees in the form of anointing the deity with water, rosewater, milk, tender coconut water, ghee and so on; presenting garlands made up of sacred leaves of the bael tree (vilwa leaves in Sanskrit, koovalam in Malayalam); Ganapathi Homam, Mrityunjaya Homam (fire rituals); Archana; Muzhukappu (adorning the deities with sandalwood paste); payasam (sweet porridge) and so on. Annadanam (feast) is offered on festival days.

== Beliefs and customs ==
In most Shiva temples, going round the sanctum is not allowed: the custom is to finish three quarters of the pradakshinam (circumambulation) up to the passage of the holy water somasootham and then return and start from the beginning. In this temple, however, as a practice followed from the early days and found by astrological consultation (deva prasnam), the full pradakshinam is allowed.
