= K. G. Marar =

Indian politician and social worker

Former State president of BJP in Kerala.

Personal details
- Born: 17 September 1934 Kannur, Kerala, India
- Died: 25 April 1995 (aged 60)
- Party: BJP

Kuruvannil Govindan Marar (17 September 1934 – 25 April 1995) was an Indian social worker and politician, who served as the State president of the Bharatiya Janata Party (BJP) in Kerala, India. He was also known as Mararji. He was the third son among four children of Narayana Marar and Nayan Marsyar. By profession, he was a teacher at Government School Parassinikadavu, located near the famous Parassinikadavu Muthappan Temple in Kannur. He left his profession to become a full-time social worker. Arrested during the Indian Emergency from 25 June 1975 to 21 March 1977, he was imprisoned for 18 months. After his release, Marar became the leader of the Janata party and the District President of Kannur. In 1980, Marar became the State Secretary of the BJP. He was very active in Kerala politics and held various positions, including State General Secretary and State President of the BJP. He actively represented the BJP in various elections, the last one being in 1991 where he was defeated by a margin of 1000 votes from the Manjeshwar constituency. His body was cremated at Payyambalam beach, Kannur.

Kummanam Rajashekharan became the second full-time worker for the RSS after Marar to hold the party state president portfolio. The state committee office of the Kerala BJP is named after K G Marar as Mararji Smruthi Mandiram.
