= C. Jayan Babu =

Indian politician

C. Jayan Babu is a politician in Kerala, India, belonging to the Communist Party of India (Marxist). In 1988, he was elected to the Trivandrum City Corporation Council and eventually was chosen the Mayor of Thiruvananthapuram. He was considered the youngest Mayor of the Kerala State Capital Thiruvananthapuram, until that time. His Mayoral tenure finished in 1989. In 2000, he became the Chairman of the Trivandrum Development Authority (TRIDA). In 2005, he again became the Mayor of Thiruvananthapuram and served in that role for five years until 2010 October.

In 2016 C. Jayan Babu was again selected the Chairman of the Trivandrum Development Authority by the State Government. He is one of the few politicians who had a chance to twice elected as a Mayor in Thiruvananthapuram and as Chairman of TRIDA.

He is a CPI(M) Thiruvananthapuram district committee member. The Kannur party conference in 2018, elected him to the CPI (M) state control commission. He represented the Pappanamcode ward in the City Council. He is married to Mrs. P. Suprabha, who is a Librarian and has a daughter named Revathy Jayan Babu who is a fashion designer living in Chennai, Tamil Nadu. A. Sampath who was a Member of Parliament, is his brother in law.
