= R. Sreelekha =

First female IPS officer from Kerala

- Born: 25 December 1960 (age 65); Thiruvananthapuram, Kerala, India
- Education: Government College for Women, Thiruvananthapuram
- Occupations: Police officer, politician
- Political party: Bharatiya Janata Party (2024–present)
- Spouse: Dr. S. Sethunath
- Police career
- Country: India
- Allegiance: Indian Police Service (Kerala Cadre)
- Department: Kerala Police
- Service years: 1987–2020
- Status: Retired DGP
- Rank: Director General of Police (Retired)
- Batch: 1987
- Cadre: Kerala
- Awards: Police Medal for Meritorious Service; President's Police Medal for Distinguished Service

R. Sreelekha (born 25 December 1960) is an Indian politician and retired police officer in the Indian Police Service (IPS), who was the first woman IPS officer as well as the first woman Director General of Police (DGP) from Kerala. She retired from service as the Director General of Fire and Rescue Services, Civil Defence, and Home Guards. She is currently serving as the councillor for the Sasthamangalam ward of the Thiruvananthapuram Corporation from 2025.

Sreelekha is also an author and now running a successful YouTube channel- “Sasneham Sreelekha” (With Love, Sreelekha) to share her experiences as a police officer. She has also served as managing director for public sector organisations in Kerala. During her tenure in the CBI, she earned the nickname of 'Raid Sreelekha'.

== Early life and family ==
Sreelekha was born on December 25, 1960 at Thiruvananthapuram, Kerala, as the daughter of Prof. N. Velayudhan Nair and B. Radhamma. Her father had fought in the World War II as a soldier in the Indian Army for the Allied Forces.

Sreelekha is married to Sethunath, a professor of pediatric surgery at Medical College Hospital, Thiruvananthapuram. The couple has a son, Gokul.

== Education ==
Sreelekha completed her schooling from Government Higher Secondary School for Girls, Cotton Hill in Thiruvananthapuram.

She then went on to complete her bachelor's degree in English Literature at the Government College for Women, Thiruvananthapuram. She then did her master's at the Institute of English in the University of Kerala. In 2005, while in service, she obtained an MBA in Human Resource Management from IGNOU.

She was awarded the Chevening Fellowship by the Government of the United Kingdom and she undertook the fellowship studies in King's College London, Sciences Po Paris, University of Edinburgh, United Nations offices in Geneva and Oxford from September to December 2015.

She also attended the Mid-Career Training Program at the London Business School and Metropolitan Police (Scotland Yard) in 2013.

== Career ==
Early career

Prior to joining the police service, Sreelekha, worked as a lecturer at the Shree Vidyadhiraja College. She also worked for the Reserve Bank of India, as a Grade B Officer and was posted as a Statistical Officer in Mumbai.

Indian Police Service

In January 1987, at the age of 26, Sreelekha became the first woman IPS officer in Kerala Cadre.

After joining the police service, she has served as District Superintendent of Police in Alappuzha, Pathanamthitta and Thrissur. Sreelekha also worked with the Central Bureau of Investigation for 4 years as Superintendent of Police in Kerala and DIG in New Delhi. She was promoted to Deputy Inspector General of the Ernakulam Range.

In 2005, Sreelekha was posted as the Managing Director of the Kerala State Co-operative Rubber Marketing Federation. In June 2007, she was posted as the Managing Director of the Roads and Bridges Development Corporation of Kerala. Later on, she also served as the Inspector General, CID. She also served as Addl. DGP, Armed Police Battalions with additional charge for Training. From her posting as ADGP Vigilance, on 15 February 2014, she has been posted as ADGP (Police Home Guards, Community Policing, Gender Justice and Nodal Officer for Nirbhaya).

She was the Organising Secretary of the 5th National Conference of Women in Police, organised by the Bureau of Police Research & Development in July 2012, and is also a strong advocate of gender parity in the Kerala Police force. As ADGP, Sreelekha was asked by Kerala Home Minister, Thiruvanchoor Radhakrishnan to conduct an inquiry into the involvement of Kerala Information Commissioner K. Natarajan, who had allegedly persuaded a Dy.S.P of Police to leave out the name of V. S. Achuthanandan from the list of accused in a land scam case. After completion of investigations, Sreelekha recommended the suspension of the Information Commissioner, upon finding that the official had misused his office. R. Sreelekha as ADGP Vigilance & anti-corruption Bureau, chargesheeted the Disproportionate Asset case against IG Tomin J. Thachankary, accused also in several other cases. As retaliation, Thachankary accused Sreelekha for violating norms in visiting Thailand prior to Government Permission.

Sreelekha sought permission from the government to file a defamation suit against Tomin J. Thachankary, and obtained the same. As the Transport Commissioner in Kerala, she reduced the road accidents and fatalities substantially through inclusive road safety measures and in 2014, there were 292 less fatalities in Kerala against the statistics in 2013, which was a record achievement in India. The revenue from taxes and penalties reached an all-time high of Rs 3000 crore during her tenure. Motor Vehicles Department became successful in e-governance, Vahan-Sarathy was completed and an android app called 'Smart trace' was made to detect vehicle duplications and digital record of around 98 lakh vehicles in the state. She also conducted Asia's first ever Road Hackathon with assistance from the World Bank, at Technopark where over 300 participants showcased their technological innovations to better road safety in the State.

For detecting Praveen Murder case in Kottayam and arresting the then - DySP R Shaji and also for getting lifetime imprisonment for him and his accomplices within 90 days of chargesheeting the case, she was awarded the Government's Meritorious Service Award.

She was the officer investigating the Kiliroor sex scandal case, and reported to the CBI court that there was no VIP involved. Thomas Chandy, an MLA and K. P. Mohanan was accused of being linked to the case. However, Sreelekha's deposition to the court was on the basis of the statement from the victim which absolved the two. R.Sreelekha investigated the irregularities in Consumerfed in procuring rice above the market price and for irregularities found in various godowns in Kochi and Thiruvananthapuram She was the Transport Commissioner of Kerala from July 2013 to September 2015, during which time, road accidents and fatalities were at an all-time low. Asia's first ever road safety Hackathon conducted by her with assistance from World Bank at Technopark Trivandrum was a huge success.

As ADGP Crime Records Bureau, she completed the Crime & Criminal Tracking networking system and started an interactive website "THUNA" (The Hand U Need for Assistance) for a public interface with police. As Additional DGP, Intelligence, Kerala from June 2016 to January 2017, her proposal to start a counseling center HATS (Help and Assistance to Tackle Stress) for police officers who are suffering from mental stress, to help those who have personal problems such as addiction, issues with senior officers, family problems, financial problems, suicide tendencies etc. has been approved by the Department.

She got promoted to the rank of Director General of Police in September 2017. From January 2017 to June 2019, she worked as the Director General of Kerala Prisons and Correctional Services. She had introduced several positive changes in the 54 prisons in the State which are now referred to as Correctional Centers. From June 2017 to 1 June 2020, she was the head of a newly created post, "Social Policing & Traffic" in Kerala and was stationed at the Kerala State Police Headquarters.

She took charge as the Director General heading the Kerala Fire And Rescue Services on 1 June 2020, becoming the first 'Woman DGP' of independent charge in Kerala.

She retired on 31 December 2020, as the Director General of the Kerala Fire And Rescue Services, after completing 33 years and 5 months in the service.

=== Police career ===
In Kerala Police Department
Post	Term	Rank Insignia
Assistant Superintendent of Police	1987	
Superintendent of Police (Alappuzha, Pathanamthitta, Thrissur Districts)	c. 1987–1990s	SP
Deputy Inspector General of Police (Ernakulam Range)	c. 2000s	DIG
Inspector General of Police, Crime Branch	c. 2000s	IGP
Additional Director General of Police, Armed Police Battalions (Training)	c. 2010–2014	ADGP Grade
ADGP (Police Home Guards, Community Policing, Gender Justice, Nirbhaya)	2014–2016	ADGP Grade
Additional Director General of Police, Intelligence	2016–2017	ADGP Grade
Director (Social Policing & Traffic), Kerala Police Headquarters	2017–2020	DGP Grade

Offices held on deputation
Post	Term	Rank Insignia
Superintendent of Police, Central Bureau of Investigation (CBI)	c. 1990s	SP
Deputy inspector general of police, Central Bureau of Investigation (CBI)		
Additional Director General of Police, Vigilance (Kerala Vigilance and Anti-Corruption Bureau)	2014	ADGP Grade
Director General of Prisons and Correctional Services (Kerala Prisons & Correctional Services)	2017–2019	ADGP Grade
Director General, Fire and Rescue Services, Civil defence, Homeguards (Kerala Fire and Rescue Services)	2020	DGP Grade

== Political career ==
After her retirement, Sreelekha joined Bharatiya Janata Party in 2024. She became a candidate for the party in Thiruvananthapuram Corporation elections. She was elected as a councillor from Ward No. 41, Sasthamangalam, of the Thiruvananthapuram Corporation, as BJP candidate. She resigned from the councillor position on 3 October 2026 stating personal reasons. But on the next day, she withdrawn her resignation.

She contested in the Kerala Assembly elections from the Vattiyoorkavu Assembly constituency and ended up in third position.

== Medals and recognition ==
- In 2004, as DIG Vigilance and Anti-Corruption Bureau, Sreelekha was awarded the President's Police Medal for Meritorious Service.
- In 2013, as ADGP Vigilance and Anti-Corruption Bureau, Sreelekha was awarded the President's Police Medal for Distinguished Service.
- In 2006, during her stint as managing director, the Rubber Board won the Thailand Government's Best Exporter of Rubber in Asia award.
- Sreelekha was selected for the prestigious Chevening Fellowship by the Government of United Kingdom and she attended the fellowship in London at King's College from September to December 2015. She also attended specialised training at Scotland Yard/metropolitan police of UK.
- She won the Indian Overseas Award for Public Service in 2006.
- FOKANA award for literary contributions was given to her in 2005.
- In 2007, she received the Kerala Government's Meritorious Services Award for detecting the sensational case of the murder of a civilian named Praveen by the then-Deputy Superintendent of Police R Shaji. After the investigation, Shaji was found guilty by the court.

== Selected works ==
Sreelekha has penned and published 9 books.

- Cheru marmarangal (2005)
- Neerazhikapuram (2006)
- Maranna Doothan (2008)
- Kuzhaloothukaran (2009)
- Lottos Theenikal (2009)
- Mansile Mazhavillu (2011)
- Niyama samrakshanam Streekalkku- a book on legal awareness to women
- Kuttikalum Policum- a book for the children about Police and their activities
- Jaagarookan (2013)- Detective novel Publisher DC Books
- Thamasoma- Detective series in Kerala Koumudi magazine
- "Balipatham", her latest novel depicts the true story of Mahabali, believed to have ruled Kerala eons back & whose return from the netherworld, Onam, the famous state festival is celebrated every year. This nook is published by Mathrubhumi Books on 2.10.2024

She writes regular columns in periodicals and magazines. Her column in Vanitha Magazine, "Marupuram, the Other Side" which is being published now is well appreciated by the readers.

Sasneham Sreelekha- YouTube Channel

https://youtube.com/channel/UCup0QqQP2A95jqYkzJuuU9w

== Controversies ==
- In November 2016, allegations of misuse of official resources were raised against R. Sreelekha. The allegations included the use of government vehicles and personnel for transporting construction materials to her residence, as well as irregularities concerning road safety funds and departmental transfers. A complaint seeking a vigilance inquiry was subsequently reported in the media. In January 2017, the Vigilance and Anti-Corruption Bureau reportedly gave Sreelekha a clean chit following a preliminary inquiry into the allegations of financial and administrative irregularities.
- In July 2022, Sreelekha alleged that the police had fabricated evidence against actor Dileep in the 2017 Kerala actress assault case. Her remarks attracted criticism, including questions about the basis of her allegations.
- In November 2025, the use of the designation “IPS” alongside her name on campaign materials for the 2025 Thiruvananthapuram Municipal Corporation election became controversial after an Aam Aadmi Party candidate complained that the designation should not be used by a retired officer without qualification. Subsequently, the designation was removed from some campaign materials and replaced with “Retd”.
- In December 2025, Sreelekha became involved in a dispute with Vattiyoorkavu MLA V. K. Prasanth over office space in a Thiruvananthapuram Corporation-owned building. Sreelekha requested that Prasanth vacate the premises for use as her councillor's office, while Prasanth maintained that his rental agreement remained valid until March 2026. He eventually decided to relocate his office to avoid further controversy.
- In January 2026, Sreelekha faced opposition from local residents after requesting the relocation of a dry-waste collection facility near her councillor's office in Sasthamangalam. She argued that the facility was causing inconvenience and that waste was being improperly dumped, while residents' associations opposed the proposal, citing the facility's role in local waste segregation and management.
- In March 2026, the Museum police registered a case against Sreelekha over allegations that she had disclosed the identities of survivors of sexual offences against minors through her YouTube channel, Sasneham Sreelekha. She denied the allegations and questioned the legal basis and applicability of the provisions invoked in the case.
- In April 2026, Sreelekha led a protest outside the Vattiyoorkavu police station over the alleged custodial assault of BJP workers. During the protest, she used the slogan “poda pulle police”, which drew criticism. She defended her language by stating that she had used similar expressions against erring police officers while in service. She was subsequently named as an accused in a case connected with the protest and the clash that occurred during it.
- In October 2026, Sreelekha faced criticism for making derogatory remarks about Indian National Congress leader Rahul Gandhi at a BJP protest meeting in Punalur, Kerala. She reportedly compared Gandhi's behaviour during a protest in Delhi to that of a person under the influence of drugs. Her remarks drew criticism from among public. Youth Congress state vice-president Vishnu Sunil Pandalam filed a complaint with the Director General of Police over the remarks. The Kerala Pradesh Congress Committee also issued her a legal notice demanding an apology.

== See also ==
- Kappazhom Raman Pillai
