= Thiruvananthapuram Corporation =

Local civic body in Thiruvananthapuram, Kerala, India

Thiruvananthapuram Municipal Corporation
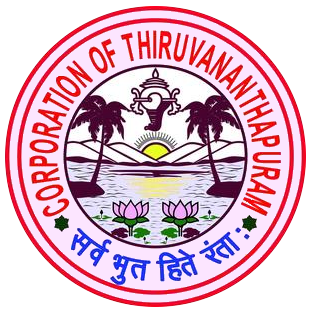

Type
- Type: Municipal Corporation

History
- Founded: 3 October 1940

Leadership
- Mayor: Adv. V. V. Rajesh, BJP since 26 December 2025
- Deputy Mayor: Asha Nath G. S., BJP since 26 December 2025
- Municipal Corporation Secretary: J Muhammed Shafi

Structure
- Seats: 101
- Political groups: Government (50) NDA (51): BJP (50); IND (1) (Note: Independent councillor M. Radhakrishnan extended support to BJP.); Official Opposition (29); LDF (29): CPI(M) (26); CPI (3); Other Opposition (21) UDF (20): INC (17); IUML (2); RSP (1); IND (1)

Elections
- Last election: 9 December 2025
- Next election: December 2030

Website
- tmc.lsgkerala.gov.in/en

Thiruvananthapuram Municipal Corporation is the municipal corporation that administrates the city of Thiruvananthapuram, the capital of Kerala. The city corporation is spread over 214.86 km^{2} with 101 wards and a population of 957,730 inhabitants. It includes the Legislative Assembly constituencies of Thiruvananthapuram, Vattiyoorkavu, Nemom, Kazhakkoottam and four wards of the Kovalam constituency.

== History ==
The Conservancy Department was started in Thiruvananthapuram in 1877 during the reign of the king Ayilyam Thirunal of the Travancore kingdom. Under this arrangement, the town was divided into 5 divisions, namely Kottaykkakam (areas inside the Fort), Chalai, Sreevaraham, Manacaud and Pettah.

The first president of the Committee was Dewan Peshkar Iraviperur Pillai. There were 19 members in the committee. The Thiruvananthapuram Municipality came into existence in 1920. After two decades, during the reign of Sree Chithira Thirunal Balarama Varma, Thiruvananthapuram Municipality was converted into Municipal Corporation on 30 October 1940.

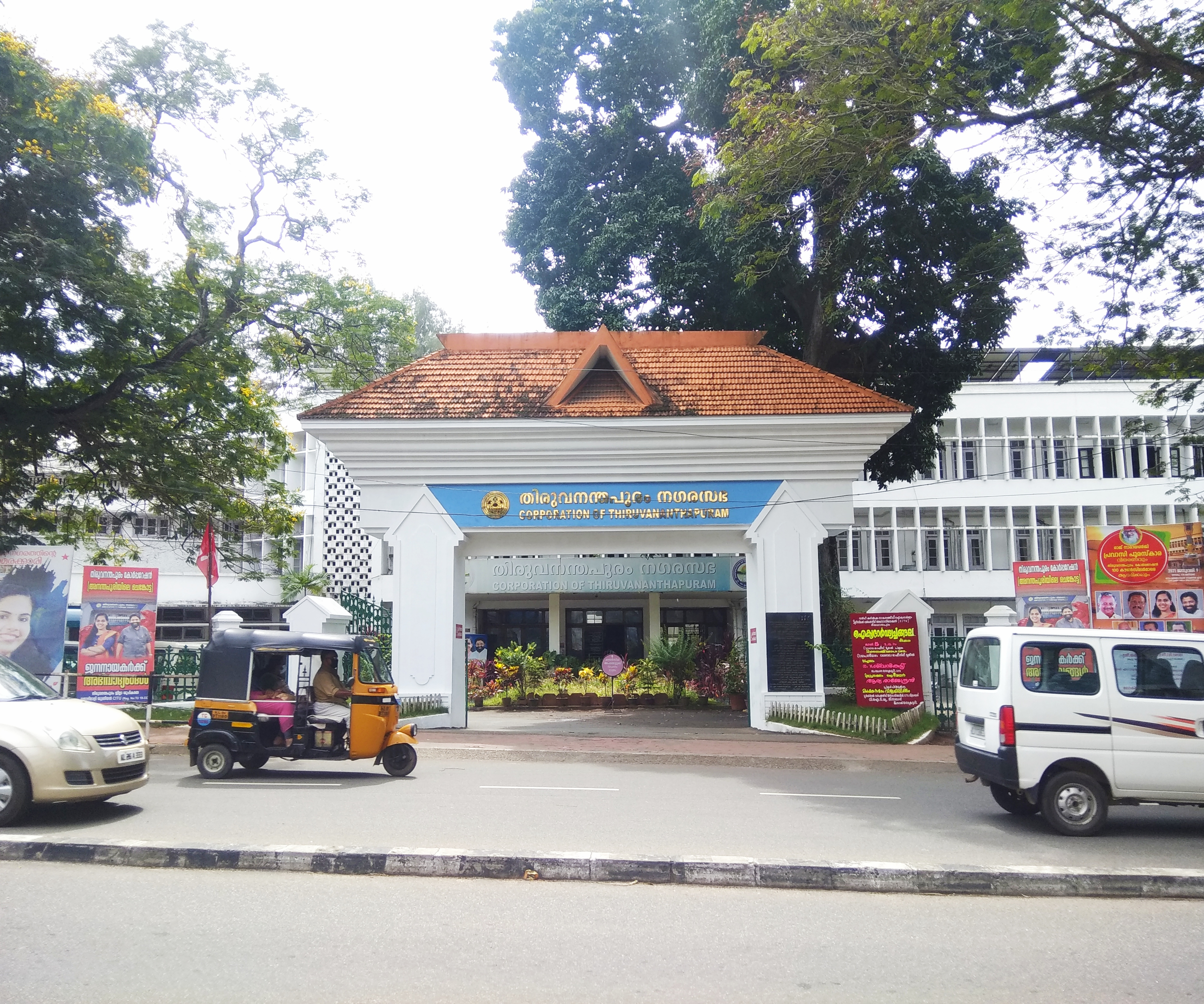
Corporation office

== Administration ==
The city corporation is governed by a council of 101 members, headed by the Mayor. The members of the Council are elected every five years, with the latest election having been in 2025. It constitutes Standing Committees for exercising its powers, discharging such duties or performing such functions as are provided for in the Kerala Municipalities Act.

The Mayor is elected by the councilors from among themselves. They chair Council meetings and are responsible for the overall supervision and control of the administrative functions of the Municipal Corporation.

The Deputy Mayor is the Chairman of the Finance Standing Committee and also presides over the Council meetings during the absence of the Mayor. The Secretary of the TMC is a civil servant appointed by the Kerala Government. The law and order of the city is handled by the Thiruvananthapuram City Police Commissioner. The total police strength in the city including the Armed Reserve camp at Nandavanam and the SAP camp at Peroorkada, is about 4,500.

The corporation was originally (in 1940) divided into 24 wards, covering an area of 30.66 km^{2}. Through the years, the city corporation has grown to 101 wards, and now the Thiruvananthapuram Corporation Council is the second largest democratically elected body in Kerala after the Legislative Assembly.

== Office holders ==
Thiruvananthapuram Municipal Corporation — Office Holders (2025–2030)
Office	Name	Notes
Mayor	V. V. Rajesh (BJP)	Incumbent office holder.
Deputy Mayor	Asha Nath G.S. (BJP)	Incumbent office holder.
Chairperson, Finance Standing Committee	Asha Nath G.S. (Deputy Mayor)	
Chairperson, Development Standing Committee	Karamana Ajith	
Chairperson, Welfare Standing Committee	Sathyavathi V.	
Chairperson, Health Standing Committee	M.R. Gopan	
Public Works Standing Committee	Manju G.S.	
Town Planning Standing Committee	M. Radhakrishnan	
Tax Appeal Standing Committee	To be elected	
Education & Sports Standing Committee	Chempazhanthy Udayan	
Corporation Secretary	Jahamgeer.S	Official appointed by the Government of Kerala.

== List of mayors ==
#	Name	Tenure			Party
1	C. O. Madhavan	30 October 1940	28 September 1942	1 year, 333 days	Independent
2	M. Govinda Pillai	28 September 1942	17 April 1943	201 days	Independent
3	K. George	17 April 1943	22 April 1944	1 year, 5 days	Independent
4	P. S. Nataraja Pillai	22 April 1944	8 August 1944	108 days	Independent
5	C. Lakshmana Sastri	8 August 1944	24 April 1945	259 days	Independent
6	P. Subramanian	24 April 1945	22 April 1947	1 year, 363 days	Independent
7	K. Gopala Pillai	22 April 1947	8 December 1947	230 days	Independent
8	S. Varadarajan Nair	17 December 1947	21 April 1949	1 year, 125 days	Indian National Congress
9	T. S. Krishnamoorthy Iyer	21 April 1949	22 April 1950	1 year, 1 day	Indian National Congress
10	P. Govindan Kutty Nair	22 April 1950	15 April 1951	358 days	Indian National Congress
11	J. E. Fernandez	16 April 1951	20 February 1953	1 year, 310 days	Indian National Congress
12	R. Balakrishnan Nair	20 February 1953	12 January 1954	326 days	Indian National Congress
13	T. Krishna Pillai	12 January 1954	11 January 1955	364 days	Indian National Congress
14	N. K. Krishna Pillai	11 January 1955	4 June 1955	144 days	Independent
15	R. Parameswaran Pillai	10 June 1955	15 March 1956	279 days	Indian National Congress
16	Ponnara Sreedhar	20 March 1956	21 February 1957	338 days	Praja Socialist Party
17	P. Govindan Kutty Nair	21 February 1957	1 November 1960	3 years, 254 days	Indian National Congress
18	E. P. Eapen	5 November 1960	6 January 1962	1 year, 62 days	Praja Socialist Party
19	C. R. Das	6 January 1962	8 January 1963	1 year, 2 days	Indian National Congress
20	C. S. Neelakandan Nair	8 January 1963	2 July 1964	1 year, 176 days	Samyukta Socialist Party
21	V. Krishna Murari	13 July 1964	8 November 1965	1 year, 118 days	Indian National Congress
22	S. Sathyakaman Nair	9 November 1965	6 November 1966	362 days	Indian National Congress
23	Kosala Ramadas	7 November 1966	2 November 1967	360 days	Communist Party of India (Marxist)
24	G. Kuttappan	3 November 1967	10 November 1968	1 year, 7 days	Praja Socialist Party
25	K. C. Vamadevan	11 November 1968	1 November 1970	1 year, 355 days	Revolutionary Socialist Party
26	A. Kunjuraman	3 November 1970	8 November 1971	1 year, 5 days	Indian National Congress
27	A. Mohamed Kassim	9 November 1971	12 November 1972	1 year, 3 days	Indian National Congress
28	K. Karunakaran	13 November 1972	11 November 1973	363 days	Indian National Congress
29	M. N. Gopinathan Nair	12 November 1973	10 November 1974	363 days	Communist Party of India (Marxist)
30	M. P. Padmanabhan	11 November 1974	11 December 1975	1 year, 30 days	Communist Party of India (Marxist)
31	M. P. Padmanabhan	3 October 1979	5 October 1981	2 years, 2 days	Communist Party of India (Marxist)
32	S. Fredy Periera	6 October 1981	4 October 1982	363 days	Communist Party of India (Marxist)
33	K. Prabhakaran Nair	5 October 1982	3 October 1983	363 days	Communist Party of India (Marxist)
34	M. Aboobaker	4 October 1983	30 September 1984	362 days	Communist Party of India (Marxist)
35	C. Jayan Babu	4 February 1988	3 February 1989	365 days	Communist Party of India (Marxist)
36	P. Maxwel	7 February 1989	4 February 1990	362 days	Communist Party of India (Marxist)
37	Stanly Sathyanesan	5 February 1990	5 February 1991	1 year, 0 days	Communist Party of India (Marxist)
38	V. Karunakaran Nair	5 February 1991	5 February 1992	1 year, 0 days	Communist Party of India (Marxist)
39	M. P. Padmanabhan	5 February 1992	31 January 1994	1 year, 360 days	Communist Party of India (Marxist)
40	V. Sivankutty	4 October 1995	4 October 2000	5 years, 0 days	Communist Party of India (Marxist)
41	J. Chandra	5 October 2000	30 September 2005	4 years, 360 days	Communist Party of India (Marxist)
42	C. Jayan Babu	6 October 2005	1 October 2010	4 years, 360 days	Communist Party of India (Marxist)
43	K. Chandrika	9 November 2010	31 October 2015	4 years, 356 days	Communist Party of India (Marxist)
44	V. K. Prasanth	18 November 2015	26 October 2019	3 years, 342 days	Communist Party of India (Marxist)
45	K. Sreekumar	12 November 2019	11 November 2020	365 days	Communist Party of India (Marxist)
46	S. Arya Rajendran	28 December 2020	20 December 2025	4 years, 357 days	Communist Party of India (Marxist)
47	V. V. Rajesh	26 December 2025	Incumbent	331 days	Bharatiya Janata Party

== Revenue sources ==
The following are the Income sources for the Corporation from the Central and State Government.

=== Revenue from taxes ===
Following is the Tax related revenue for the corporation.

- Property tax.
- Profession tax.
- Entertainment tax.
- Grants from Central and State Government like Goods and Services Tax.
- Advertisement tax.

=== Revenue from non-tax sources ===
Following is the Non Tax related revenue for the corporation.

- Water usage charges.
- Fees from Documentation services.
- Rent received from municipal property.
- Funds from municipal bonds.

== Current members ==
The 101 wards of the Thiruvananthapuram Municipal Corporation and their councillors are listed below in the serial wise order.

Mayor: V. V. Rajesh
Deputy Mayor: Asha Nath G. S.
Assembly	Ward Details		Councillor	Party	Alliance	Remarks
Assembly	No.	Name	Councillor	Party	Alliance	Remarks
Kazhakootam	1	Kazhakootam	Prashant S.	Communist Party of India (Marxist)	LDF	
Kazhakootam	2	Sainik School	V. Sudevan Nair	Bharatiya Janata Party	NDA	
Kazhakootam	3	Chanthavila	Anu G Prabha	Bharatiya Janata Party	NDA	
Kazhakootam	4	Kattaikonam	Sindhu Shashi	Communist Party of India (Marxist)	LDF	
Kazhakootam	5	Njandoorkonam	A. Pradeep Kumar	Bharatiya Janata Party	NDA	
Kazhakootam	6	Powdikonam	Deepu Raj	Bharatiya Janata Party	NDA	
Kazhakootam	7	Chenkottukonam	Archana Manikandan	Bharatiya Janata Party	NDA	
Kazhakootam	8	Chempazhanthy	Shailaja	Indian National Congress	UDF	
Kazhakootam	9	Kariavattom	S.S. Sandhyarani	Bharatiya Janata Party	NDA	
Kazhakootam	10	Pangappara	Deepa Suresh	Communist Party of India (Marxist)	LDF	
Kazhakootam	11	Sreekariyam	Adv.Bindu V.S.	Indian National Congress	UDF	
Kazhakootam	12	Chellamangalam	Arun Vattavila	Communist Party of India (Marxist)	LDF	
Kazhakootam	13	Mannanthala	Chempazhanthy Udayan	Bharatiya Janata Party	NDA	
Vattiyoorkavu	14	Pathirapalli	B. Ajayakumar	Communist Party of India (Marxist)	LDF	
Vattiyoorkavu	15	Ambalamukku	Kumari Jayanthi R.C.	Bharatiya Janata Party	NDA	
Vattiyoorkavu	16	Kudappanakunnu	Anitha S.	Indian National Congress	UDF	
Vattiyoorkavu	17	Thuruthummoola	V. Vijayakumar	Bharatiya Janata Party	NDA	
Vattiyoorkavu	18	Nettayam	Yamuna R.S.	Bharatiya Janata Party	NDA	
Vattiyoorkavu	19	Kachani	Aromal K.G.	Communist Party of India (Marxist)	LDF	
Vattiyoorkavu	20	Vazhottukonam	Sugathan R.	Bharatiya Janata Party	NDA	
Vattiyoorkavu	21	Kodunganoor	V. V. Rajesh	Bharatiya Janata Party	NDA	Mayor
Vattiyoorkavu	22	Vattiyoorkavu	Adv.Nanda Bhargav	Bharatiya Janata Party	NDA	
Vattiyoorkavu	23	Kanjirampara	Sumi Balu	Bharatiya Janata Party	NDA	
Vattiyoorkavu	24	Peroorkada	Vineeth V.G.	Communist Party of India (Marxist)	LDF	
Vattiyoorkavu	25	Kowdiar	K. S. Sabarinadhan	Indian National Congress	UDF	
Vattiyoorkavu	26	Kuravankonam	Maya R.S.	Revolutionary Socialist Party	UDF	
Vattiyoorkavu	27	Muttada	Vaishna Suresh	Indian National Congress	UDF	
Vattiyoorkavu	28	Chettivilakam	R. Dinesh Kumar	Bharatiya Janata Party	NDA	
Vattiyoorkavu	29	Kinavoor	B. Subhash	Indian National Congress	UDF	
Kazhakootam	30	Nalanchira	Thresiamma Teacher	Indian National Congress	UDF	
Kazhakootam	31	Edavacode	Swathi S. Kumar	Bharatiya Janata Party	NDA	
Kazhakootam	32	Ulloor	Liju S.	Communist Party of India (Marxist)	LDF	
Kazhakootam	33	Medical College	S.S. Sindhu	Communist Party of India (Marxist)	LDF	
Vattiyoorkavu	34	Pattom	Reshma C.	Indian National Congress	UDF	
Vattiyoorkavu	35	Kesavadasapuram	Anitha Alex	Indian National Congress	UDF	
Vattiyoorkavu	36	Gowreeshapattom	Adv.Parvathi	Communist Party of India (Marxist)	LDF	
Vattiyoorkavu	37	Kunnukuzhy	Mary Pushpam A.	Indian National Congress	UDF	
Vattiyoorkavu	38	Nanthancode	K.R. Cletus	Indian National Congress	UDF	
Thiruvananthapuram	39	Palayam	Shirley S.	Indian National Congress	UDF	
Thiruvananthapuram	40	Vazhuthacaud	Adv.Rakhi Ravikumar	Communist Party of India	LDF	
Vattiyoorkavu	41	Sasthamangalam	R. Sreelekha	Bharatiya Janata Party	NDA	
Vattiyoorkavu	42	Pangode	Vishnu Mohan M.	Bharatiya Janata Party	NDA	
Nemom	43	Thirumala	P.S. Devima	Bharatiya Janata Party	NDA	
Vattiyoorkavu	44	Valiyavila	Adv.V.G. Girikumar	Bharatiya Janata Party	NDA	
Nemom	45	Thrikkannapuram	Ajin S.L.	Communist Party of India (Marxist)	LDF	
Nemom	46	Punnakkamugal	Shivaji R.P.	Communist Party of India (Marxist)	LDF	
Nemom	47	Poojappura	Rajalakshmi T.	Bharatiya Janata Party	NDA	
Thiruvananthapuram	48	Jagathy	P.T. Madhu	Bharatiya Janata Party	NDA	
Thiruvananthapuram	49	Thycaud	G. Venugopal	Communist Party of India (Marxist)	LDF	
Thiruvananthapuram	50	Valiyasala	Surya V.S.	Bharatiya Janata Party	NDA	
Thiruvananthapuram	51	Arannoor	Ranjith T.K.	Communist Party of India (Marxist)	LDF	
Nemom	52	Mudavanmugal	V. Gopakumar	Communist Party of India (Marxist)	LDF	
Nemom	53	Estate	R. Abhilash	Bharatiya Janata Party	NDA	
Nemom	54	Nemom	M. R. Gopan	Bharatiya Janata Party	NDA	
Nemom	55	Ponnumangalam	Sridevi S. K.	Bharatiya Janata Party	NDA	
Nemom	56	Melamcode	Pappanamcode Saji	Bharatiya Janata Party	NDA	
Nemom	57	Pappanamcode	Niramankara Hari	Bharatiya Janata Party	NDA	
Nemom	58	Karamana	Karamana Ajith	Bharatiya Janata Party	NDA	
Nemom	59	Nedumcaud	R. C. Beena	Bharatiya Janata Party	NDA	
Nemom	60	Kaladi	Manju G. S.	Bharatiya Janata Party	NDA	
Nemom	61	Karumom	Ashanath G. S.	Bharatiya Janata Party	NDA	Deputy Mayor
Nemom	62	Punchakkari	Shailajadevi C.	Communist Party of India (Marxist)	LDF	
Nemom	63	Poonkulam	Vayalkkara Ratheesh	Bharatiya Janata Party	NDA	
Kovalam	64	Venganoor	Lathikakumari S.	Indian National Congress	UDF	
Kovalam	65	Port	Paniyadima J.	Communist Party of India	LDF	
Kovalam	66	Vizhinjam	K H Sudheerkhan	Indian National Congress	UDF	
Kovalam	67	Harbour	Afsa Sajina	Communist Party of India (Marxist)	LDF	
Nemom	68	Vellar	Sathyavathi V.	Bharatiya Janata Party	NDA	
Nemom	69	Thiruvallam	Pachalloor Gopakumar	Bharatiya Janata Party	NDA	
Thiruvananthapuram	70	Poonthura	Srruthymol Poonthoora.	Indian National Congress	UDF	
Thiruvananthapuram	71	Puthenppalli	Shamna Teacher	Indian Union Muslim League	UDF	
Nemom	72	Ambalathara	Simi Jyotish	Bharatiya Janata Party	NDA	
Nemom	73	Attukal	Srruthy S. S.	Bharatiya Janata Party	NDA	
Nemom	74	Kalippankulam	Razia Begum	Communist Party of India (Marxist)	LDF	
Nemom	75	Kamaleswaram	Giri V.	Bharatiya Janata Party	NDA	
Thiruvananthapuram	76	Beemapalli	Sajina Teacher	Indian Union Muslim League	UDF	
Thiruvananthapuram	77	Valiyathura	Sheeba Patrick	Indian National Congress	UDF	
Thiruvananthapuram	78	Vallakkadavu	Shajida Naseer	Communist Party of India (Marxist)	LDF	
Thiruvananthapuram	79	Sreevaraham	Mini R.	Bharatiya Janata Party	NDA	
Thiruvananthapuram	80	Manacaud	Saritha P.	Bharatiya Janata Party	NDA	
Thiruvananthapuram	81	Chalai	S. K. P. Ramesh	Bharatiya Janata Party	NDA	
Thiruvananthapuram	82	Fort	Harikumar S.	Bharatiya Janata Party	NDA	
Thiruvananthapuram	83	Perunthanni	Deepa S. Nair	Bharatiya Janata Party	NDA	
Thiruvananthapuram	84	Sreekanteswaram	Sukanya O.	Bharatiya Janata Party	NDA	
Thiruvananthapuram	85	Thampanoor	R. Harikumar	Indian National Congress	UDF	
Thiruvananthapuram	86	Vanchiyoor	Vanchiyoor P Babu	Communist Party of India (Marxist)	LDF	
Vattiyoorkavu	87	Kannammoola	P. Radhakrishnan (Note: Extended support to BJP led NDA.)	Independent	NDA	
Thiruvananthapuram	88	Pettah	Adv.Deepak S. P.	Communist Party of India (Marxist)	LDF	
Thiruvananthapuram	89	Chackai	K. Sreekumar	Communist Party of India (Marxist)	LDF	
Thiruvananthapuram	90	Vettukadu	Kinsey Ivin	Communist Party of India (Marxist)	LDF	
Kazhakootam	91	Karikkakam	Adv.Aswathy M. S.	Communist Party of India (Marxist)	LDF	
Kazhakootam	92	Kadakampally	Jaya Rajeev	Bharatiya Janata Party	NDA	
Kazhakootam	93	Anamugham	Veenakumari R.	Communist Party of India	LDF	
Kazhakootam	94	Akkulam	Adv.Mini P. S.	Bharatiya Janata Party	NDA	
Kazhakootam	95	Cheruvaikkal	Vinod R.	Bharatiya Janata Party	NDA	
Kazhakootam	96	Alathara	K. P. Bindu	Bharatiya Janata Party	NDA	
Kazhakootam	97	Kuzhivila	B. Rajendran	Bharatiya Janata Party	NDA	
Kazhakootam	98	Poundkadavu	Sudheesh Kumar	Independent	None	
Kazhakootam	99	Kulathoor	Shruthi I. M.	Communist Party of India (Marxist)	LDF	
Kazhakootam	100	Attipra	Sunil S. S.	Bharatiya Janata Party	NDA	
Kazhakootam	101	Pallithura	Suchithra T.	Communist Party of India (Marxist)	LDF	

== Elections ==
=== Corporation Election 2025 ===
S.No.	Party name	Party symbol	Number of Corporators	Change	Map
1.	BJP		50	▲15	
2.	LDF		29	▼23	
3.	UDF		20	▲10	
4.	IND		2	▼1	

Ward Number	Ward Name(En)	Winning candidate	Party	Alliance	Margin
1.	Kazhakkoottam	Prashanth S.	CPI(M)	LDF	511
2.	Sainika School	V. Sudevan Nair	BJP	NDA	278
3.	Chanthavila	Anu G. Prabha	BJP	NDA	2
4.	Kattaikonam	Sindhu Sasi	CPI(M)	LDF	965
5.	Njandoorkonam	A. Pradeep Kumar	BJP	NDA	887
6.	Powdikonam	Deepuraj	BJP	NDA	297
7.	Chenkottukonam	Archana Manikantan	BJP	NDA	468
8.	Chempazhanthy	Shailaja	INC	UDF	73
9.	Kariavattom	S. S. Sandhyarani	BJP	NDA	293
10.	Pangappara	Deepa Suresh	CPI(M)	LDF	150
11.	Sreekariyam	Adv. Bindu V. S.	INC	UDF	190
12.	Chellamangalam	Arun Vattavila	CPI(M)	LDF	78
13.	Mannanthala	Chempazhanthy Udayan	BJP	NDA	126
14.	Pathirappalli	B. Ajayakumar	CPI(M)	LDF	481
15.	Ambalamukku	Kumari Jayanthi R. C.	BJP	NDA	278
16.	Kudappanakunnu	Anitha S.	INC	UDF	435
17.	Thuruthummoola	V. Vijayakumar	BJP	NDA	1,554
18.	Nettayam	Yamuna R. S.	BJP	NDA	1,078
19.	Kachani	Aromal K. G.	CPI(M)	LDF	348
20.	Vazhottukonam	Sugathan R.	BJP	NDA	58
21.	Kodunganoor	V. V. Rajesh	BJP	NDA	515
22.	Vattiyoorkavu	Adv. Nanda Bhargav	BJP	NDA	713
23.	Kanjirampara	Sumi Balu	BJP	NDA	39
24.	Peroorkada	Vineeth V. G.	CPI(M)	LDF	179
25.	Kowdiar	K. S. Sabarinathan	INC	UDF	74
26.	Kuravankonam	Maya R. S.	RSP	UDF	350
27.	Muttada	Vyshna Suresh	INC	UDF	397
28.	Chettivilakam	R. Dinesh Kumar	BJP	NDA	143
29.	Kinavoor	B. Subhash	INC	UDF	1,437
30.	Nalanchira	Thresyamma Teacher	INC	UDF	822
31.	Edavakode	Swathi S. Kumar	BJP	NDA	26
32.	Ulloor	Liju S.	CPI(M)	LDF	47
33.	Medical College	S. S. Sindhu	CPI(M)	LDF	207
34.	Pattom	Reshma C.	INC	UDF	166
35.	Kesavadasapuram	Anitha Alex	INC	UDF	51
36.	Gowreeshapattom	Adv. Parvathi	CPI(M)	LDF	468
37.	Kunnukuzhy	Mary Pushpam A.	INC	UDF	697
38.	Nanthancode	K. R. Cleetus	INC	UDF	255
39.	Palayam	Sherly S.	INC	UDF	431
40.	Vazhuthacaud	Adv. Rakhi Ravikumar	CPI	LDF	298
41.	Sasthamangalam	R. Sreelekha	BJP	NDA	708
42.	Pangode	Vishnu Mohan M.	BJP	NDA	1,224
43.	Thirumala	P. S. Devima	BJP	NDA	886
44.	Valiyavila	Adv. V. G. Girikumar	BJP	NDA	335
45.	Thrikkannapuram	Ajin S. L.	CPI(M)	LDF	190
46.	Punnakkamugal	Shivaji R. P.	CPI(M)	LDF	507
47.	Poojappura	Rajalekshmi T.	BJP	NDA	842
48.	Jagathy	P. T. Madhu	BJP	NDA	428
49.	Thycaud	G. Venugopal	CPI(M)	LDF	264
50.	Valiyasala	Soorya V. S.	BJP	NDA	327

=== Corporation Election 2020 ===
S.No.	Party name	Party symbol	Number of Corporators	Change
1.	LDF		52	▲9
2.	BJP		35	Steady
3.	UDF		10	▼11
4.	IND		3	▲2

Ward Number	Ward Name(En)	Ward Name(Ml)	Assembly constituency	Political Group
96	AAKKULAM	ആക്കുളം	Kazhakkoottam	UDF
98	AATTIPRA	ആറ്റിപ്ര	Kazhakootam	LDF
67	AMBALATHARA	അമ്പലത്തറ	Nemom	LDF
95	ANAMUGHAM	അണമുഖം	Kazhakootam	LDF
46	ARANNOOR	ആറന്നൂര്‍	Thiruvananthapuram	LDF
70	ATTUKAL	ആറ്റുകാല്‍	Nemom	LDF
77	BEEMAPALLI	ബീമാപള്ളി	Thiruvananthapuram	UDF
76	BEEMAPALLI EAST	ബീമാപള്ളി ഈസ്റ്റ്‌	Thiruvananthapuram	LDF
86	CHAKKA	ചാക്ക	Thiruvananthapuram	LDF
71	CHALAI	ചാല	Thiruvananthapuram	BJP
2	CHANTHAVILA	ചന്തവിള	Kazhakkoottam	LDF
8	CHELLAMANGALAM	ചെല്ലമംഗലം	Kazhakkoottam	BJP
9	CHEMPAZHANTHY	ചെമ്പഴന്തി	Kazhakkoottam	BJP
5	CHERUVAKKAL	ചെറുവക്കല്‍	Kazhakkoottam	BJP
21	CHETTIVILAKAM	ചെട്ടിവിളാകം	Vattoyoorkaav	BJP
7	EDAVACODE	ഇടവക്കോട്	Kazhakkoottam	LDF
53	ESTATE	എസ്റ്റേറ്റ്‌	Nemom	BJP
80	FORT	ഫോര്‍ട്ട്	Thiruvananthapuram	BJP
63	HARBOUR	ഹാര്‍ബര്‍	Kovalam	IND
44	JAGATHY	ജഗതി	Thiruvananthapuram	BJP
34	KACHANI	കാച്ചാണി	Vattiyoorkaav	LDF
92	KADAKAMPALLY	കടകംപള്ളി	Kazhakoottam	LDF
55	KALADI	കാലടി	Nemom	BJP
69	KALIPPANKULAM	കളിപ്പാന്‍കുളം	Nemom	LDF
68	KAMALESWARAM	കമലേശ്വരം	Nemom	LDF
30	KANJIRAMPARA	കാഞ്ഞിരംപാറ	Vattiyoorkaav	BJP
94	KANNAMMOOLA	കണ്ണമ്മൂല	Vattiyoorkavu	LDF
45	KARAMANA	കരമന	Nemom	BJP
91	KARIKKAKAM	കരിക്കകം	Kazhakootam	BJP
3	KATTAYIKONAM	കാട്ടായിക്കോണം	Kazhakkoottam	LDF
1	KAZHAKKUTTOM	കഴക്കൂട്ടം	Kazhakkoottam	LDF
15	KESAVADASAPURAM	കേസവദാസപുരം	Vattiyoorkaav	LDF
12	KINAVOOR	കിണവൂര്‍	Vattiyoorkaav	LDF
37	KODUNGANOOR	കൊടുങ്ങാനൂര്‍	Vattiyoorkaav	BJP
61	KOTTAPURAM	കോട്ടപ്പുറം	Kovalam	IND
23	KOWDIAR	കവടിയാര്‍	Vattiyoorkavu	UDF
19	KUDAPPANAKUNNU	കുടപ്പനകുന്ന്	Vattiyoorkaav	LDF
97	KULATHOOR	കുളത്തൂര്‍	Kazhakkoottam	LDF
26	KUNNUKUZHY	കുന്നുകുഴി	Vattiyoorkavu	UDF
24	KURAVANKONAM	കുറവന്‍ക്കോണം	Vattiyoorkaav	UDF
73	KURYATHI	കുര്യാത്തി	Thiruvananthapuram	BJP
72	MANACAUD	മണക്കാട്	Thiruvananthapuram	BJP
75	MANIKYAVILAKAM	മാണിക്യവിളാകം	Thiruvananthapuram	LDF
13	MANNANTHALA	മണ്ണന്തല	Kazhakoottam	UDF
16	MEDICAL COLLEGE	മെഡിക്കല്‍ കോളേജ്	Vattiyoorkaav, Kazhakoottam	LDF
56	MELAMCODE	മേലാംകോട്	Nemom	BJP
47	MUDAVANMUGHAL	മുടവന്മുഗള്‍	Nemom	LDF
60	MULLOOR	മുല്ലൂര്‍	Kovalam	UDF
18	MUTTADA	മുട്ടട	Vattiyoorkaav	LDF
78	MUTTATHARA	മുട്ടത്തറ	Thiruvananthapuram	LDF
14	NALANCHIRA	നാലാഞ്ചിറ	Vattiyoorkaav, Kazhakoottam	UDF
25	NANTHANCODE	നന്തന്‍കോട്	Vattiyoorkavu	LDF
54	NEDUNKADU	നെടുങ്കാട്	Nemom	BJP
49	NEMOM	നേമം	Nemom	BJP
33	NETTAYAM	നെട്ടയം	Vattiyoorkavu	BJP
11	NJANDDORKONAM	ഞാണ്ടൂര്‍ക്കോണം	Kazhakkoottam	LDF
38	P T P NAGAR	പി. റ്റി .പി നഗര്‍	Vattiyoorkaav	BJP
27	PALAYAM	പാളയം	Thiruvananthapuram	LDF
85	PALKULANGARA	പാല്‍ക്കുളങ്ങര	Thiruvananthapuram	BJP
100	PALLITHURA	പള്ളിത്തുറ	Kazhakoottam	LDF
39	PANGODU	പാങ്ങോട്	Vattiyoorkaav	BJP
52	PAPPANAMCODE	പാപ്പനംകോട്	Nemom	BJP
20	PATHIRAPALLI	പാതിരപ്പളളി	Vattiyoorkaavu	LDF
17	PATTOM	പട്ടം	Vattiyoorkaav	LDF
31	PEROORKADA	പേരൂര്‍ക്കട	Vattiyoorkavu	LDF
84	PERUNTHANNI	പെരുന്താന്നി	Thiruvananthapuram	UDF
93	PETTAH	പേട്ട	Thiruvananthapuram	LDF
50	PONNUMANGALAM	പൊന്നുമംഗലം	Nemom	BJP
42	POOJAPURA	പൂജപ്പുര	Nemom	BJP
99	POUNDKADAVU	പൗണ്ട്കടവ്	Kazhakoottam	LDF
10	POWDIKONAM	പൗഡിക്കോണം	Kazhakkoottam	BJP
57	PUNCHAKARI	പുഞ്ചക്കരി	Nemom	LDF
58	PUNKULAM	പൂങ്കുളം	Nemom	LDF
51	PUNNAKKA MUGHAL	പുന്നയ്ക്കാമുഗള്‍	Nemom	BJP
66	PUNTHURA	പൂന്തുറ	Thiruvananthapuram	IND
74	PUTHENPALLI	പുത്തന്‍പള്ളി	Thiruvananthapuram	LDF
89	SANGHUMUGHAM	ശംഖുമുഖം	Thiruvananthapuram	UDF
22	SASTHAMANGALAM	ശാസ്തമംഗലം	Vattiyoorkaav	BJP
83	SREEKANTESWARAM	ശ്രീകണ്ഠേശ്വരം	Thiruvananthapuram	BJP
4	SREEKARIYAM	ശ്രീകാര്യം	Kazhakkoottam	LDF
79	SREEVARAHAM	ശ്രീവരാഹം	Thiruvananthapuram	LDF
81	THAMPANOOR	തമ്പാനൂര്‍	Thiruvananthapuram	LDF
40	THIRUMALA	തിരുമല	Nemom	BJP
48	THRIKANNAPURAM	തൃക്കണ്ണാപുരം	Nemom	BJP
65	THRUVALLAM	തിരുവല്ലം	Nemom	BJP
32	THURUTHUMMOOLA	തുരുത്തുംമൂല	Vattiyoorkaav	BJP
28	THYCAUD	തൈക്കാട്	Thiruvananthapuram	LDF
6	ULLOOR	ഉള്ളൂര്‍	Kazhakkoottam	LDF
43	VALIYASALA	വലിയശാല	Thiruvananthapuram	LDF
87	VALIYATHURA	വലിയതുറ	Thiruvananthapuram	LDF
41	VALIYAVILA	വലിയവിള	Thiruvananthapuram	BJP
88	VALLAKKADAVU	വള്ളക്കടവ്	Thiruvananthapuram	LDF
82	VANCHIYOOR	വഞ്ചിയൂര്‍	Thiruvananthapuram	LDF
36	VATTIYOORKAVU	വട്ടിയൂര്‍ക്കാവ്	Vattiyoorkavu	LDF
35	VAZHOTTUKONAM	വഴോട്ടുകോണം	Vattiyoorkaav	LDF
29	VAZHUTHACAUD	വഴുതക്കാട്	Thiruvananthapuram	LDF
64	VELLAR	വെള്ളാര്‍	Nemom	BJP
59	VENGANOOR	വെങ്ങാനൂര്‍	Kovalam	LDF
90	VETTUKADU	വെട്ടുകാട്	Thiruvananthapuram	LDF
62	VIZHINJAM	വിഴിഞ്ഞം	Kovalam	LDF

=== Corporation Election 2015 ===
S.No.	Party name	Party symbol	Number of Corporators	Change
1.	LDF		43	▼8
2.	BJP		35	▲29
3.	UDF		21	▼19
4.	IND		1	▼2

Ward Number	Ward Name(En)	Ward Name(Ml)	Assembly constituency	Political Group
96	AAKKULAM	ആക്കുളം	Kazhakkoottam	UDF
98	AATTIPRA	ആറ്റിപ്ര	Kazhakootam	BJP
67	AMBALATHARA	അമ്പലത്തറ	Nemom	LDF
95	ANAMUGHAM	അണമുഖം	Kazhakootam	LDF
46	ARANNOOR	ആറന്നൂര്‍	Thiruvananthapuram	LDF
70	ATTUKAL	ആറ്റുകാല്‍	Nemom	BJP
77	BEEMAPALLI	ബീമാപള്ളി	Thiruvananthapuram	UDF
76	BEEMAPALLI EAST	ബീമാപള്ളി ഈസ്റ്റ്‌	Thiruvananthapuram	UDF
86	CHAKKA	ചാക്ക	Thiruvananthapuram	LDF
71	CHALAI	ചാല	Thiruvananthapuram	BJP
2	CHANTHAVILA	ചന്തവിള	Kazhakkoottam	UDF
8	CHELLAMANGALAM	ചെല്ലമംഗലം	Kazhakkoottam	LDF
9	CHEMPAZHANTHY	ചെമ്പഴന്തി	Kazhakkoottam	LDF
5	CHERUVAKKAL	ചെറുവക്കല്‍	Kazhakkoottam	UDF
21	CHETTIVILAKAM	ചെട്ടിവിളാകം	Vattiyoorkaav	BJP
7	EDAVACODE	ഇടവക്കോട്	Kazhakkoottam	LDF
53	ESTATE	എസ്റ്റേറ്റ്‌	Nemom	LDF
80	FORT	ഫോര്‍ട്ട്	Thiruvananthapuram	BJP
63	HARBOUR	ഹാര്‍ബര്‍	Kovalam	UDF
44	JAGATHY	ജഗതി	Thiruvananthapuram	BJP
34	KACHANI	കാച്ചാണി	Vattiyoorkaav	LDF
92	KADAKAMPALLY	കടകംപള്ളി	Kazhakoottam	LDF
55	KALADI	കാലടി	Nemom	BJP
69	KALIPPANKULAM	കളിപ്പാന്‍കുളം	Nemom	LDF
68	KAMALESWARAM	കമലേശ്വരം	Nemom	BJP
30	KANJIRAMPARA	കാഞ്ഞിരംപാറ	Vattiyoorkaav	LDF
94	KANNAMMOOLA	കണ്ണമ്മൂല	Vattiyoorkavu	LDF
45	KARAMANA	കരമന	Nemom	BJP
91	KARIKKAKAM	കരിക്കകം	Kazhakootam	BJP
3	KATTAYIKONAM	കാട്ടായിക്കോണം	Kazhakkoottam	LDF
1	KAZHAKKUTTOM	കഴക്കൂട്ടം	Kazhakkoottam	LDF
15	KESAVADASAPURAM	കേസവദാസപുരം	Vattiyoorkaav	UDF
12	KINAVOOR	കിണവൂര്‍	Vattiyoorkaav	UDF
37	KODUNGANOOR	കൊടുങ്ങാനൂര്‍	Vattiyoorkaav	BJP
61	KOTTAPURAM	കോട്ടപ്പുറം	Kovalam	LDF
23	KOWDIAR	കവടിയാര്‍	Vattiyoorkavu	UDF
19	KUDAPPANAKUNNU	കുടപ്പനകുന്ന്	Vattiyoorkaav	UDF
97	KULATHOOR	കുളത്തൂര്‍	Kazhakkoottam	LDF
26	KUNNUKUZHY	കുന്നുകുഴി	Vattiyoorkavu	LDF
24	KURAVANKONAM	കുറവന്‍ക്കോണം	Vattiyoorkaav	UDF
73	KURYATHI	കുര്യാത്തി	Thiruvananthapuram	BJP
72	MANACAUD	മണക്കാട്	Thiruvananthapuram	BJP
75	MANIKYAVILAKAM	മാണിക്യവിളാകം	Thiruvananthapuram	LDF
13	MANNANTHALA	മണ്ണന്തല	Kazhakoottam	LDF
16	MEDICAL COLLEGE	മെഡിക്കല്‍ കോളേജ്	Vattiyoorkaav, Kazhakoottam	LDF
56	MELAMCODE	മേലാംകോട്	Nemom	BJP
47	MUDAVANMUGHAL	മുടവന്മുഗള്‍	Nemom	LDF
60	MULLOOR	മുല്ലൂര്‍	Kovalam	UDF
18	MUTTADA	മുട്ടട	Vattiyoorkaav	LDF
78	MUTTATHARA	മുട്ടത്തറ	Thiruvananthapuram	LDF
14	NALANCHIRA	നാലാഞ്ചിറ	Vattiyoorkaav, Kazhakoottam	UDF
25	NANTHANCODE	നന്തന്‍കോട്	Vattiyoorkavu	LDF
54	NEDUNKADU	നെടുങ്കാട്	Nemom	LDF
49	NEMOM	നേമം	Nemom	BJP
33	NETTAYAM	നെട്ടയം	Vattiyoorkavu	LDF
11	NJANDDORKONAM	ഞാണ്ടൂര്‍ക്കോണം	Kazhakkoottam	BJP
38	P T P NAGAR	പി. റ്റി .പി നഗര്‍	Vattiyoorkaav	BJP
27	PALAYAM	പാളയം	Thiruvananthapuram	LDF
85	PALKULANGARA	പാല്‍ക്കുളങ്ങര	Thiruvananthapuram	BJP
100	PALLITHURA	പള്ളിത്തുറ	Kazhakoottam	UDF
39	PANGODU	പാങ്ങോട്	Vattiyoorkaav	BJP
52	PAPPANAMCODE	പാപ്പനംകോട്	Nemom	BJP
20	PATHIRAPALLI	പാതിരപ്പളളി	Vattiyoorkaavu	BJP
17	PATTOM	പട്ടം	Vattiyoorkaav	BJP
31	PEROORKADA	പേരൂര്‍ക്കട	Vattiyoorkavu	LDF
84	PERUNTHANNI	പെരുന്താന്നി	Thiruvananthapuram	BJP
93	PETTAH	പേട്ട	Thiruvananthapuram	UDF
50	PONNUMANGALAM	പൊന്നുമംഗലം	Nemom	LDF
42	POOJAPURA	പൂജപ്പുര	Nemom	BJP
99	POUNDKADAVU	പൗണ്ട്കടവ്	Kazhakoottam	LDF
10	POWDIKONAM	പൗഡിക്കോണം	Kazhakkoottam	BJP
57	PUNCHAKARI	പുഞ്ചക്കരി	Nemom	UDF
58	PUNKULAM	പൂങ്കുളം	Nemom	LDF
51	PUNNAKKA MUGHAL	പുന്നയ്ക്കാമുഗള്‍	Nemom	LDF
66	PUNTHURA	പൂന്തുറ	Thiruvananthapuram	UDF
74	PUTHENPALLI	പുത്തന്‍പള്ളി	Thiruvananthapuram	LDF
89	SANGHUMUGHAM	ശംഖുമുഖം	Thiruvananthapuram	LDF
22	SASTHAMANGALAM	ശാസ്തമംഗലം	Vattiyoorkaav	LDF
83	SREEKANTESWARAM	ശ്രീകണ്ഠേശ്വരം	Thiruvananthapuram	BJP
4	SREEKARIYAM	ശ്രീകാര്യം	Kazhakkoottam	IND
79	SREEVARAHAM	ശ്രീവരാഹം	Thiruvananthapuram	BJP
81	THAMPANOOR	തമ്പാനൂര്‍	Thiruvananthapuram	LDF
40	THIRUMALA	തിരുമല	Nemom	BJP
48	THRIKANNAPURAM	തൃക്കണ്ണാപുരം	Nemom	BJP
65	THRUVALLAM	തിരുവല്ലം	Nemom	UDF
32	THURUTHUMMOOLA	തുരുത്തുംമൂല	Vattiyoorkaav	BJP
28	THYCAUD	തൈക്കാട്	Thiruvananthapuram	LDF
6	ULLOOR	ഉള്ളൂര്‍	Kazhakkoottam	UDF
43	VALIYASALA	വലിയശാല	Thiruvananthapuram	BJP
87	VALIYATHURA	വലിയതുറ	Thiruvananthapuram	UDF
41	VALIYAVILA	വലിയവിള	Thiruvananthapuram	BJP
88	VALLAKKADAVU	വള്ളക്കടവ്	Thiruvananthapuram	LDF
82	VANCHIYOOR	വഞ്ചിയൂര്‍	Thiruvananthapuram	LDF
36	VATTIYOORKAVU	വട്ടിയൂര്‍ക്കാവ്	Vattiyoorkavu	BJP
35	VAZHOTTUKONAM	വഴോട്ടുകോണം	Vattiyoorkaav	LDF
29	VAZHUTHACAUD	വഴുതക്കാട്	Thiruvananthapuram	LDF
64	VELLAR	വെള്ളാര്‍	Nemom	BJP
59	VENGANOOR	വെങ്ങാനൂര്‍	Kovalam	BJP
90	VETTUKADU	വെട്ടുകാട്	Thiruvananthapuram	UDF
62	VIZHINJAM	വിഴിഞ്ഞം	Kovalam	LDF

=== Corporation Election 2010 ===
S.No.	Party name	Party symbol	Number of Corporators	Change
1.	LDF		51	Steady
3.	UDF		40	Steady
3.	BJP		06	Steady
4.	IND		03	Steady

Ward Number	Ward Name(En)	Ward Name(Ml)	Assembly constituency	Political Group
96	AAKKULAM	ആക്കുളം	Kazhakkoottam	UDF
98	AATTIPRA	ആറ്റിപ്ര	Kazhakootam	LDF
67	AMBALATHARA	അമ്പലത്തറ	Nemom	LDF
95	ANAMUGHAM	അണമുഖം	Kazhakootam	LDF
46	ARANNOOR	ആറന്നൂര്‍	Thiruvananthapuram	LDF
70	ATTUKAL	ആറ്റുകാല്‍	Nemom	LDF
77	BEEMAPALLI	ബീമാപള്ളി	Thiruvananthapuram	UDF
76	BEEMAPALLI EAST	ബീമാപള്ളി ഈസ്റ്റ്‌	Thiruvananthapuram	LDF
86	CHAKKA	ചാക്ക	Thiruvananthapuram	LDF
71	CHALAI	ചാല	Thiruvananthapuram	LDF
2	CHANTHAVILA	ചന്തവിള	Kazhakkoottam	UDF
8	CHELLAMANGALAM	ചെല്ലമംഗലം	Kazhakkoottam	LDF
9	CHEMPAZHANTHY	ചെമ്പഴന്തി	Kazhakkoottam	UDF
5	CHERUVAKKAL	ചെറുവക്കല്‍	Kazhakkoottam	UDF
21	CHETTIVILAKAM	ചെട്ടിവിളാകം	Vattoyoorkaav	LDF
7	EDAVACODE	ഇടവക്കോട്	Kazhakkoottam	LDF
53	ESTATE	എസ്റ്റേറ്റ്‌	Nemom	UDF
80	FORT	ഫോര്‍ട്ട്	Thiruvananthapuram	IND
63	HARBOUR	ഹാര്‍ബര്‍	Kovalam	UDF
44	JAGATHY	ജഗതി	Thiruvananthapuram	BJP
34	KACHANI	കാച്ചാണി	Vattiyoorkaav	LDF
92	KADAKAMPALLY	കടകംപള്ളി	Kazhakoottam	LDF
55	KALADI	കാലടി	Nemom	UDF
69	KALIPPANKULAM	കളിപ്പാന്‍കുളം	Nemom	LDF
68	KAMALESWARAM	കമലേശ്വരം	Nemom	LDF
30	KANJIRAMPARA	കാഞ്ഞിരംപാറ	Vattiyoorkaav	LDF
94	KANNAMMOOLA	കണ്ണമ്മൂല	Vattiyoorkavu	UDF
45	KARAMANA	കരമന	Nemom	LDF
91	KARIKKAKAM	കരിക്കകം	Kazhakootam	LDF
3	KATTAYIKONAM	കാട്ടായിക്കോണം	Kazhakkoottam	LDF
1	KAZHAKKUTTOM	കഴക്കൂട്ടം	Kazhakkoottam	UDF
15	KESAVADASAPURAM	കേസവദാസപുരം	Vattiyoorkaav	UDF
12	KINAVOOR	കിണവൂര്‍	Vattiyoorkaav	UDF
37	KODUNGANOOR	കൊടുങ്ങാനൂര്‍	Vattiyoorkaav	UDF
61	KOTTAPURAM	കോട്ടപ്പുറം	Kovalam	UDF
23	KOWDIAR	കവടിയാര്‍	Vattiyoorkavu	UDF
19	KUDAPPANAKUNNU	കുടപ്പനകുന്ന്	Vattiyoorkaav	LDF
97	KULATHOOR	കുളത്തൂര്‍	Kazhakkoottam	LDF
26	KUNNUKUZHY	കുന്നുകുഴി	Vattiyoorkavu	UDF
24	KURAVANKONAM	കുറവന്‍ക്കോണം	Vattiyoorkaav	UDF
73	KURYATHI	കുര്യാത്തി	Thiruvananthapuram	BJP
72	MANACAUD	മണക്കാട്	Thiruvananthapuram	UDF
75	MANIKYAVILAKAM	മാണിക്യവിളാകം	Thiruvananthapuram	IND
13	MANNANTHALA	മണ്ണന്തല	Kazhakoottam	UDF
16	MEDICAL COLLEGE	മെഡിക്കല്‍ കോളേജ്	Vattiyoorkaav, Kazhakoottam	UDF
56	MELAMCODE	മേലാംകോട്	Nemom	LDF
47	MUDAVANMUGHAL	മുടവന്മുഗള്‍	Nemom	UDF
60	MULLOOR	മുല്ലൂര്‍	Kovalam	UDF
18	MUTTADA	മുട്ടട	Vattiyoorkaav	LDF
78	MUTTATHARA	മുട്ടത്തറ	Thiruvananthapuram	LDF
14	NALANCHIRA	നാലാഞ്ചിറ	Vattiyoorkaav, Kazhakoottam	UDF
25	NANTHANCODE	നന്തന്‍കോട്	Vattiyoorkavu	UDF
54	NEDUNKADU	നെടുങ്കാട്	Nemom	LDF
49	NEMOM	നേമം	Nemom	UDF
33	NETTAYAM	നെട്ടയം	Vattiyoorkavu	BJP
11	NJANDDORKONAM	ഞാണ്ടൂര്‍ക്കോണം	Kazhakkoottam	LDF
38	P T P NAGAR	പി. റ്റി .പി നഗര്‍	Vattiyoorkaav	LDF
27	PALAYAM	പാളയം	Thiruvananthapuram	LDF
85	PALKULANGARA	പാല്‍ക്കുളങ്ങര	Thiruvananthapuram	BJP
100	PALLITHURA	പള്ളിത്തുറ	Kazhakoottam	LDF
39	PANGODU	പാങ്ങോട്	Vattiyoorkaav	LDF
52	PAPPANAMCODE	പാപ്പനംകോട്	Nemom	LDF
20	PATHIRAPALLI	പാതിരപ്പളളി	Vattiyoorkaavu	LDF
17	PATTOM	പട്ടം	Vattiyoorkaav	UDF
31	PEROORKADA	പേരൂര്‍ക്കട	Vattiyoorkavu	LDF
84	PERUNTHANNI	പെരുന്താന്നി	Thiruvananthapuram	UDF
93	PETTAH	പേട്ട	Thiruvananthapuram	LDF
50	PONNUMANGALAM	പൊന്നുമംഗലം	Nemom	BJP
42	POOJAPURA	പൂജപ്പുര	Nemom	UDF
99	POUNDKADAVU	പൗണ്ട്കടവ്	Kazhakoottam	LDF
10	POWDIKONAM	പൗഡിക്കോണം	Kazhakkoottam	LDF
57	PUNCHAKARI	പുഞ്ചക്കരി	Nemom	LDF
58	PUNKULAM	പൂങ്കുളം	Nemom	LDF
51	PUNNAKKA MUGHAL	പുന്നയ്ക്കാമുഗള്‍	Nemom	LDF
66	PUNTHURA	പൂന്തുറ	Thiruvananthapuram	LDF
74	PUTHENPALLI	പുത്തന്‍പള്ളി	Thiruvananthapuram	LDF
89	SANGHUMUGHAM	ശംഖുമുഖം	Thiruvananthapuram	LDF
22	SASTHAMANGALAM	ശാസ്തമംഗലം	Vattiyoorkaav	UDF
83	SREEKANTESWARAM	ശ്രീകണ്ഠേശ്വരം	Thiruvananthapuram	BJP
4	SREEKARIYAM	ശ്രീകാര്യം	Kazhakkoottam	IND
79	SREEVARAHAM	ശ്രീവരാഹം	Thiruvananthapuram	LDF
81	THAMPANOOR	തമ്പാനൂര്‍	Thiruvananthapuram	UDF
40	THIRUMALA	തിരുമല	Nemom	LDF
48	THRIKANNAPURAM	തൃക്കണ്ണാപുരം	Nemom	LDF
65	THRUVALLAM	തിരുവല്ലം	Nemom	UDF
32	THURUTHUMMOOLA	തുരുത്തുംമൂല	Vattiyoorkaav	UDF
28	THYCAUD	തൈക്കാട്	Thiruvananthapuram	UDF
6	ULLOOR	ഉള്ളൂര്‍	Kazhakkoottam	LDF
43	VALIYASALA	വലിയശാല	Thiruvananthapuram	LDF
87	VALIYATHURA	വലിയതുറ	Thiruvananthapuram	UDF
41	VALIYAVILA	വലിയവിള	Thiruvananthapuram	LDF
88	VALLAKKADAVU	വള്ളക്കടവ്	Thiruvananthapuram	LDF
82	VANCHIYOOR	വഞ്ചിയൂര്‍	Thiruvananthapuram	UDF
36	VATTIYOORKAVU	വട്ടിയൂര്‍ക്കാവ്	Vattiyoorkavu	LDF
35	VAZHOTTUKONAM	വഴോട്ടുകോണം	Vattiyoorkaav	UDF
29	VAZHUTHACAUD	വഴുതക്കാട്	Thiruvananthapuram	UDF
64	VELLAR	വെള്ളാര്‍	Nemom	UDF
59	VENGANOOR	വെങ്ങാനൂര്‍	Kovalam	LDF
90	VETTUKADU	വെട്ടുകാട്	Thiruvananthapuram	LDF
62	VIZHINJAM	വിഴിഞ്ഞം	Kovalam	UDF
