= Vilappil =

- Village
- Location in Kerala, India Vilappil (India)
- Coordinates: 8.5136800°N 77.031120°E
- Country: India
- State: Kerala
- District: Thiruvananthapuram

Government
  - Body: Gram panchayat

Population (2011)
  - Total: 36,212

Languages
  - Official: Malayalam, English
- Time zone: UTC+5:30 (IST)
- PIN: 695573
- Vehicle registration: KL 01, KL 20, KL 74

Vilappil is a village in Thiruvananthapuram district in the state of Kerala, India.

== Demographics ==
At the 2011 census of India, Vilappil had a population of 36,212 with 17,595 males and 18,617 females.
