= Sasthamangalam =

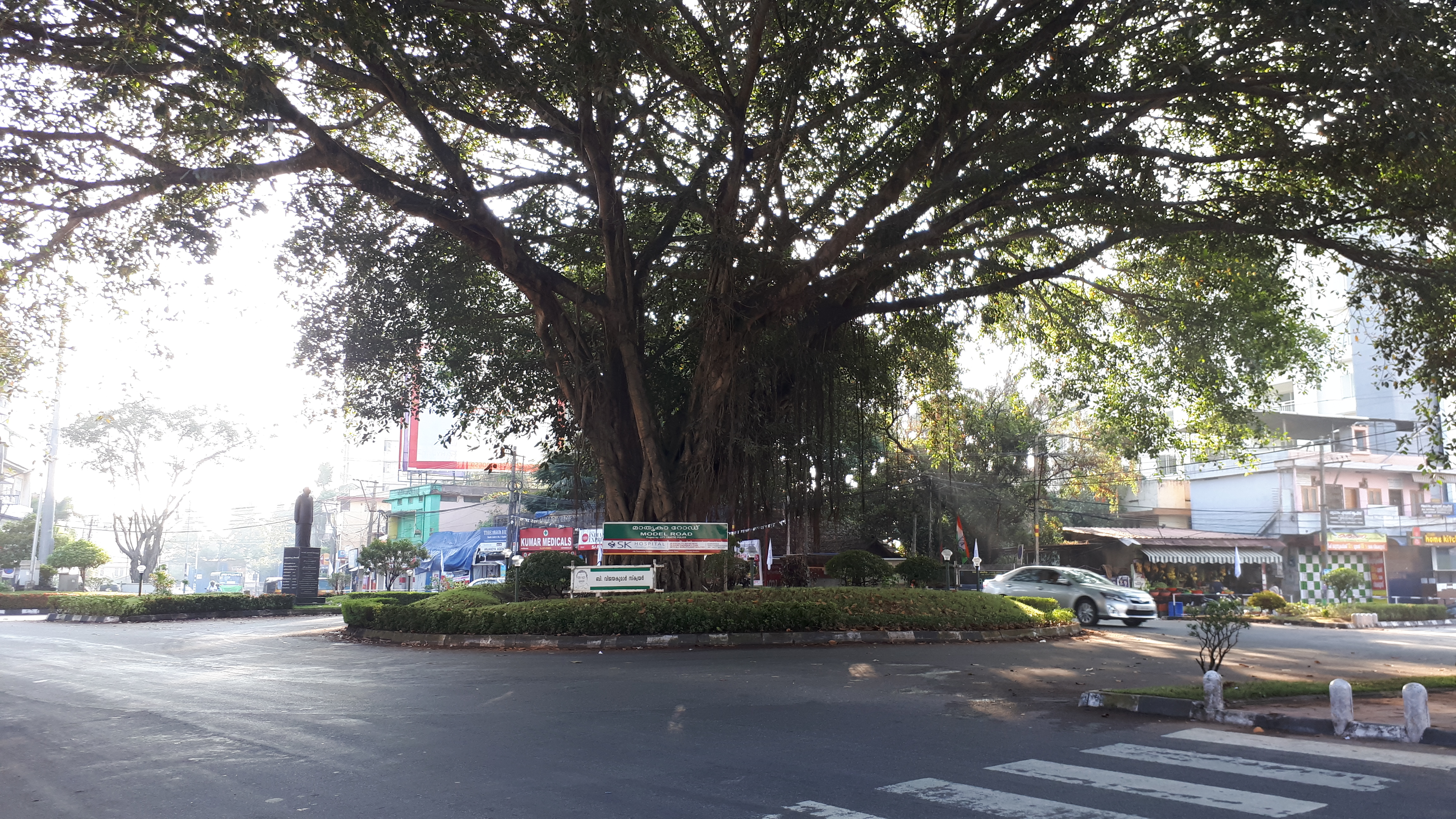

- Location in Kerala, India
- Coordinates: 8°30′51.39″N 76°58′18.04″E
- Country: India
- State: Kerala
- District: Thiruvananthapuram

Languages
  - Official: Malayalam, English
- Time zone: UTC+5:30 (IST)
- Telephone code: 0471
- Vehicle registration: KL-01

Sasthamangalam is a ward in the city of Thiruvananthapuram, Kerala, India.

It is known for the Sasthamangalam Mahadevar Temple, one of the four major temples regularly visited by the Kings of Travancore, in the past. The road along which the king would descend from the royal chariot and walk to the temple is now known as Radhapura Kunnu Lane.
