= Political parties in Kerala =

Overview of the political parties in Kerala

Kerala Legislative Assembly കേരള നിയമസഭ
- 16th Kerala Assembly

Type
- Type: unicameral
- Term limits: 5 Year

History
- Preceded by: 15th Kerala Legislative Assembly

Leadership
- Speaker: Thiruvanchoor Radhakrishnan
- Deputy Speaker: Shanimol Usman
- Chief Minister (Leader of the House): V D Satheesan
- Leader of the Opposition: Pinarayi Vijayan
- Deputy Leader of the Opposition: Vacant

Structure
- Seats: 140
- Political groups: Government (102) UDF (102): INC (63); IUML (22); KEC (7); RSP (3); KC(J) (1); CMP (1); RMPI (1); Independent (4); Official Opposition (35) LDF (35): CPI(M) (26); CPI (8); RJD (1); Other Opposition (3): BJP (3)

Elections
- Voting system: First past the post
- Last election: 9 April 2026
- Next election: 2031

Meeting place
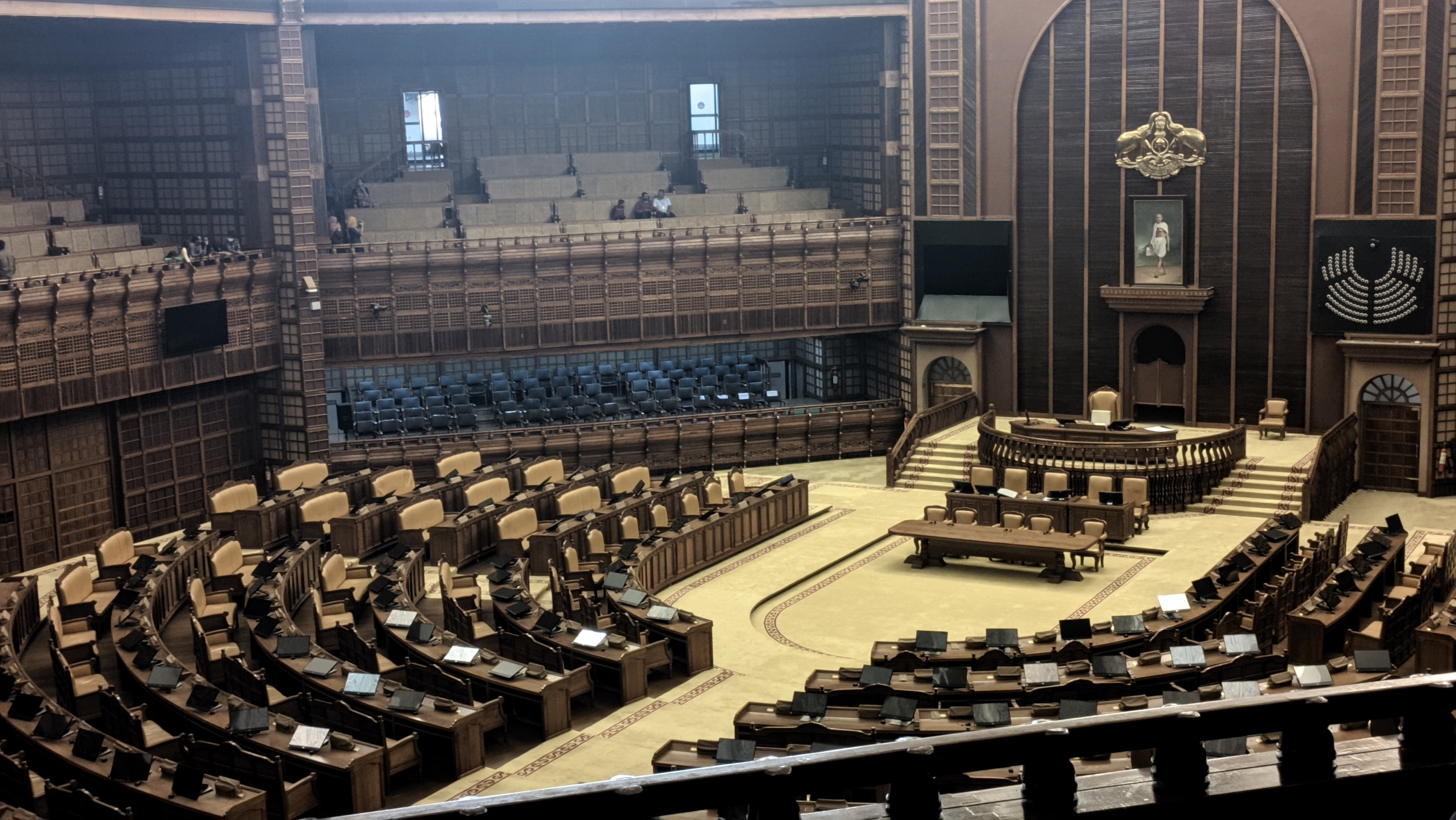
- Niyamasabha Mandiram, Thiruvananthapuram, Kerala

Website
- www.niyamasabha.org

Kerala's major political parties are aligned under two coalitions, namely the Left Democratic Front (LDF) and the United Democratic Front (UDF) since the late 1970s. Kerala was the first Indian state to have coalition government as early as 1961 .

== Pre-poll alliances ==
=== State-level alliances ===
- United Democratic Front

The United Democratic Front (UDF) is the Indian National Congress-led alliance of centre to centre-right political parties in the Indian state of Kerala. It is the current ruling political alliance of Kerala, since 2026. It is one of the two major political alliances in Kerala, the other being Communist Party of India (Marxist)-led Left Democratic Front, each of which has been in power alternately since 1980 E. K. Nayanar ministry.

United Democratic Front was created by the Indian National Congress (then known as Congress-Indira) party leader K. Karunakaran in 1979, as a successor to the existing Congress-led alliance. The alliance first came to power in 1981 (K. Karunakaran ministry) and has won elections to the state legislature of Kerala in the years 1982 (Karunakaran ministry), 1991 (Karunakaran and A. K. Antony ministries), 2001 (Antony and Oommen Chandy ministries), and 2011 (Oommen Chandy ministry). The alliance currently acts as the opposition in the state legislature of Kerala (after the 2021 legislative assembly election). United Democratic Front leaders V. D. Satheesan and Sunny Joseph currently serves as the Leader of the Opposition and Kerala Pradesh Congress Committee President respectively.

The alliance currently consists of Indian National Congress, Indian Union Muslim League, Kerala Congress (Joseph), Kerala Congress (Jacob), Revolutionary Socialist Party and a variety of other smaller parties. The alliance follows big tent policy and includes a variety political parties.

- National Democratic Alliance
- Left Democratic Front

The Left Democratic Front (LDF), also known as Left Front (Kerala), is an alliance of left-wing political parties in the state of Kerala, India. It is one of the two major political alliances in Kerala, the other being Indian National Congress-led United Democratic Front, each of which has been in power alternately for the last four decades. LDF has won the elections to the State Legislature of Kerala in the years 1980, 1987, 1996, 2006, 2016 and had a historic re-election in 2021 where an incumbent government was re-elected for first time in 40 years. LDF has won 6 out of 10 elections since the formation of the alliance in 1980. The alliance consists of CPI(M), CPI and various smaller parties.

LDF has been in power in the State Legislature of Kerala under E. K. Nayanar (1980–1981, 1987–1991, 1996–2001), V. S. Achuthanandan (2006–2011), Pinarayi Vijayan (2016–current). E. K. Nayanar served as the Chief Minister of Kerala for 11 years and later became the longest serving Chief Minister of Kerala.

The alliance led by Pinarayi Vijayan returned to power in 2016 Assembly Election winning 91 out of 140 seats and further increasing its tally to 99 seats in the 2021 Assembly Election. Pinarayi Vijayan became the first Chief minister of Kerala to be re-elected after completing a full term (five years) in office after a historic election in 2021 where an incumbent government was re-elected for the first time in 40 years.

=== National-level alliances ===
- INDIA(INC+)
- NDA(BJP+)

== National parties ==
Political party	Abbr.	Flag	Electoral symbol	Political position	Founded	Founder	KL unit leader	Alliance	Seats		
Political party	Abbr.	Flag	Electoral symbol	Political position	Founded	Founder	KL unit leader	Alliance	Lok Sabha	Rajya Sabha	Kerala Legislative Assembly
Communist Party of India (Marxist)	CPIM			Left-wing	7 November 1964	E. M. S. Namboodiripad	M. V. Govindan	LDF	1 / 20	4 / 9	26 / 120
Indian National Congress	INC			Centre to Centre-left	28 December 1885	Allan Octavian Hume	Sunny Joseph	UDF	14 / 20	1 / 9	63 / 140
Bharatiya Janata Party	BJP			Right to Far-right	6 April 1980	Atal Bihari Vajpayee	Rajeev Chandrashekhar	NDA	1 / 20	0 / 9	3 / 140
Aam Aadmi Party	AAP			Centre	26 November 2012	Arvind Kejriwal	P. C. Cyriac	N/A	0 / 20	0 / 9	0 / 140
Bahujan Samaj Party	BSP			Centre	14 April 1984	Kanshi Ram	Advocate Pralhadan	N/A	0 / 20	0 / 9	0 / 140

== State parties ==
Party	Abbr.	Flag	Election symbol	Political position	Ideology	Founded	Leader(s)	Kerala Unit Leader	Alliance	Seats		
Party	Abbr.	Flag	Election symbol	Political position	Ideology	Founded	Leader(s)	Kerala Unit Leader	Alliance	Lok Sabha	Rajya Sabha	State assemblies
Communist Party of India	CPI			Left-wing	Communism; Marxism–Leninism; Anti-capitalism; Socialism; Secularism	1925	D. Raja	Binoy Viswam	LDF	0 / 20	2 / 9	8 / 140
Kerala Congress (M)	KECM			Centre-Right	Welfare; Democratic socialism	1979	Jose K. Mani	Jose K. Mani	LDF	1 / 20	1 / 9	0 / 140
Rashtriya Janata Dal	RJD			Centre-left	Socialism	1997	Lalu Prasad Yadav; Tejashwi Yadav	Adv. John John	LDF	0 / 20	0 / 9	1 / 140
Kerala Congress	KEC			Centre-Right	Welfare	1964	P. J. Joseph	P. J. Joseph	UDF	1 / 20	0 / 9	7 / 140
Indian Union Muslim League	IUML			Centre-right	Muslim interests Social conservatism	1948	Hyderali Shihab Thangal	Sadiq Ali Thangal	UDF	2 / 20	1 / 9	22 / 140
Revolutionary Socialist Party	RSP			Far-left	Communism; Marxism–Leninism; Revolutionary socialism	1940	Manoj Bhattacharya	A. A. Aziz	UDF	1 / 20	0 / 9	3 / 140
Nationalist Congress Party (Sharadchandra Pawar)	NCP-SP			Centre	Indian nationalism Secularism	2024	Sharad Pawar	PC Chacko	LDF	0 / 20	0 / 9	0 / 140

== Unrecognised Parties ==
Party	Abbr.	Flag	Political position	Ideology	Founded	Kerala Unit Leader	Alliance	Seats		
Party	Abbr.	Flag	Political position	Ideology	Founded	Kerala Unit Leader	Alliance	Lok Sabha	Rajya Sabha	State assemblies
Kerala Congress (B)	KECB		Left-wing	Democratic socialism	1977	K. B. Ganesh Kumar	LDF	0 / 20	0 / 9	0 / 140
Communist Marxist Party	CMP		Left-wing	Communism; Marxism	1986	C. P. John	UDF	0 / 20	0 / 9	1 / 140
Congress Socialist Party	CSP		Left-wing	Democratic socialism Anti-imperialism	2026	Kadannappalli Ramachandran	LDF	0 / 20	0 / 9	0 / 140
Kerala Congress (Jacob)	KECJ		Centre-Right	Secularism; Socialism; Democracy	1993	Anoop Jacob	UDF	0 / 20	0 / 9	1 / 140
Indian National League	INL			Secularism	1994	Ahamed Devarkovil	LDF	0 / 20	0 / 9	0 / 140
National Secular Conference	NSC			Scheduled Castes interests Secularism	2011	V. Abdurahiman	LDF	0 / 20	0 / 9	0 / 140
Revolutionary Marxist Party of India	RMPI		Left-Wing	Communism; Marxism-Leninism	2016	K. K. Rema	UDF	0 / 20	0 / 9	1 / 140
Janadhipathya Kerala Congress	JKC		Centre-Left	Socialism	2016	Dr. K. C. Joseph	LDF	0 / 20	0 / 9	0 / 140
Revolutionary Socialist Party (Leninist)	RSPL		Far-Left	Communism; Marxism–Leninism; Revolutionary socialism	2016	Kovoor Kunjumon	LDF	0 / 20	0 / 9	0 / 140
National Janata Dal	NJD				2018	Adv John John	UDF	0 / 20	0 / 9	0 / 140
Kerala Democratic Party	KDP		Centre-Left	Democratic socialism Liberalism	2021	Mani C. Kappan	UDF	0 / 20	0 / 9	1 / 140
Bharath Dharma Jana Sena	BDJS		Centre-Right		2015	Thushar Vellapally	NDA	0 / 20	0 / 9	0 / 140
Twenty20 Party	TTP		Centre	Welfarism	2015	Sabu M. Jacob	NDA	0 / 20	0 / 9	0 / 140
Indian Socialist Janata Dal	ISJD		Centre-Left	Democratic socialism	2026	Mathew T. Thomas	LDF	0 / 20	0 / 9	0 / 140
Kerala Congress Democratic	KCD		Centre-Right	Welfare	2024	Saji Manjakadambil	NDA	0 / 20	0 / 9	0 / 140
All India Trinamool Congress	AITC			Secularism	2024	P. V. Anvar		0 / 20	0 / 9	0 / 140
AnnA DHRM Party Of India	AnnA DHRM Party			Social Democracy; Through; Common man	2020	Saji Kollam		0 / 20	0 / 9	0 / 140

== See also ==
- Communist Party of India (Marxist) – Kerala
- Kerala Pradesh Congress Committee
- Bharatiya Janata Party – Kerala
- 2024 Indian general election in Kerala
- 2021 Kerala Legislative Assembly election
