= First Oommen ministry =

2004–06 government of Kerala, India

First Oommen Chandy ministry
- 19th Cabinet of Kerala
- 2004-06
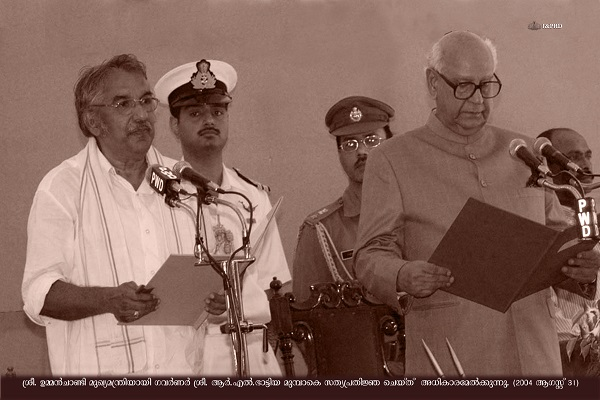
- Date formed: 31 August 2004
- Date dissolved: 12 May 2006

People and organisations
- Head of government: Oommen Chandy
- Member parties: UDF
- Status in legislature: Majority
- Opposition party: LDF
- Opposition leader: V. S. Achuthanandan

History
- Election: 2001
- Predecessor: Third Antony ministry
- Successor: Achuthanandan ministry

The Eleventh Kerala Legislative Assembly Council of Ministers in Oommen Chandy's first ministry, was a Kerala Council of Ministers (Kerala Cabinet), the executive wing of Kerala state government, led by Indian National Congress leader Oommen Chandy from 31 August 2004 to 12 May 2006.

This government came into office following the resignation of A.K. Antony from the Chief Minister's post ostensibly due to the debacle of the United Democratic Front in the 2004 Lok Sabha Elections.

This was the 19h Ministry in Kerala and it comprised 20 ministers.

	Minister	Party	Ministry/Portfolio
1	Oommen Chandy	Indian National Congress	Chief Minister (Also in charge of Home Department)
2	Vakkom Purushothaman	Indian National Congress	Minister for Finance
3	K. M. Mani	Kerala Congress	Minister for Revenue
4	M. K. Muneer	Indian Union Muslim League	Minister for Public Works
5	P. K. Kunhalikutty	Indian Union Muslim League	Minister for Industries
6	K. R. Gouri Amma	Janathipathiya Samrakshana Samithy	Minister for Agriculture
7	M. V. Raghavan	Communist Marxist Party	Minister for Co-operation
8	Aryadan Muhammed	Indian National Congress	Minister for Electricity
9	Babu Divakaran	Revolutionary Socialist Party (India)	Minister for Labour and Minister for Employment
10	Thiruvanchoor Radhakrishnan	Indian National Congress	Minister for Water Resources
11	N. Sakthan	Indian National Congress	Minister for Transport
12	C. F. Thomas	Kerala Congress	Minister for Rural Development
13	K K Ramachandran Master	Indian National Congress	Minister for Health
14	K. P. Viswanathan	Indian National Congress	Minister for Forests
15	E. T. Muhammed Basheer	Indian Union Muslim League	Minister for Education
16	K. C. Venugopal	Indian National Congress	Minister for Tourism and Devaswom
17	Adoor Prakash	Indian National Congress	Minister for Food
18	Kutty Ahammed Kutty	Indian Union Muslim League	Minister for Local Self Government
19	Dominic Presentation	Indian National Congress	Minister for Fisheries
20	A. P. Anil Kumar	Indian National Congress	Minister for Cultural Affairs and Backward Caste Development

== Trivia ==
Oommen Chandy was sworn in as the Chief Minister of Kerala on 31 August 2004 after the controversial resignation of A. K. Antony on 29 August. All ministers in the previous Antony government except K.M. Mani, P.K. Kunjalikkutty, K.R. Gowri Amma, M.V. Raghavan, Dr. M.K. Muneer, Babu Divakaran and C.F. Thomas were ousted. Kunjalikkutty resigned on 31 December 2004, after finding himself guilty in the notorious Ice Cream Parlour Scandal. He was succeeded by his colleague V.K. Ibrahim Kunju the next day (1 January 2005). K.P. Viswanathan, who handled the department of Forests, resigned on 9 February 2005 after a series of scandals, and A. Sujanapal succeeded him on 4 January 2006. In the interval, the CM himself handled the department of Forests.

== See also ==
- Chief Minister of Kerala
- List of chief ministers of Kerala
- List of Kerala ministers
