= Antony ministry =

Antony ministry may refer to:

- First Antony ministry, the Kerala government headed by A. K. Antony from 1977 to 1978
- Second Antony ministry, the Kerala government headed by A. K. Antony from 1995 to 1996
- Third Antony ministry, the Kerala government headed by A. K. Antony from 2001 to 2004

== See also ==
- A. K. Antony
