= Second Nayanar ministry =

1987–91 government of Kerala, India

Second E. K. Nayanar Ministry
- 14th Cabinet of Kerala
- 1987-1991
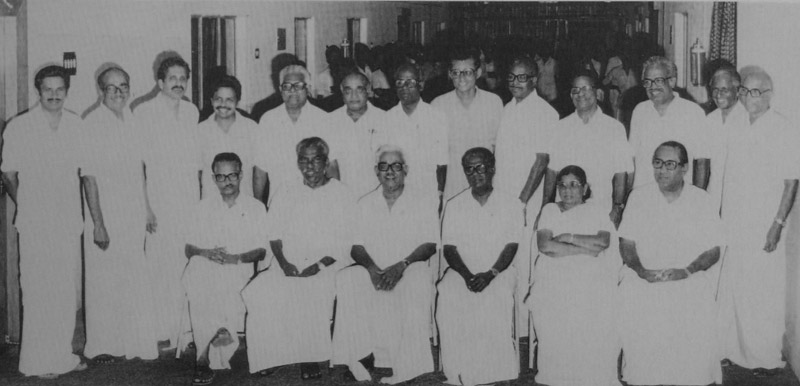
- Second Nayanar Ministry in 1987
- Date formed: 26 March 1987
- Date dissolved: 17 June 1991

People and organisations
- Head of government: E. K. Nayanar
- Member parties: LDF
- Status in legislature: Majority
- Opposition party: UDF
- Opposition leader: K. Karunakaran

History
- Election: 1987
- Predecessor: Third Karunakaran ministry
- Successor: Fourth Karunakaran ministry

The Eighth Kerala Legislative Assembly Council of Ministers, second E. K. Nayanar ministry, was a Kerala Council of Ministers (Kerala Cabinet), the executive wing of Kerala state government, led by Communist Party leader E. K. Nayanar from 26 March 1987 to 17 June 1991. It consisted of nineteen ministries, and overall twenty ministers.

The Kerala Council of Ministers, during Nayanar's second term as Chief Minister of Kerala, consisted of:

== Ministers ==
Name	Office	Portfolio	Took Office	Left Office
E. K. Nayanar	Chief Minister	Home Department	26 March 1987	17 June 1991
Baby John	Minister	Irrigation	26 March 1987	17 June 1991
K. Chandrasekharan	Minister	Education and Law	26 March 1987	17 June 1991
E. Chandrasekharan Nair	Minister	Food and Civil Supplies	2 April 1987	17 June 1991
K.R. Gowri Amma	Minister	Industries and Social Welfare	2 April 1987	17 June 1991
T.K. Hamza	Minister	Public Works	2 April 1987	17 June 1991
Lonappan Nambadan	Minister	Housing	2 April 1987	17 June 1991
Neelalohithadasan Nadar	Minister	Sports and Youth Affairs	2 April 1987	17 June 1991
K. Pankajakshan	Minister	Labour	2 April 1987	17 June 1991
P. K. Raghavan	Minister	Scheduled Castes and Scheduled Tribes Development	2 April 1987	17 June 1991
V. V. Raghavan	Minister	Agriculture	2 April 1987	17 June 1991
T.K. Ramakrishnan	Minister	Co-operation, Culture and Fisheries	2 April 1987	17 June 1991
K. Sankaranarayana Pillai	Minister	Transport	2 April 1987	17 June 1991
A. C. Shanmughadas	Minister	Health	26 March 1987	17 June 1991
T. Sivadasa Menon	Minister	Electricity and Rural Development	2 April 1987	17 June 1991
P.S. Sreenivasan	Minister	Revenue and Tourism	26 March 1987	17 June 1991
V. J. Thankappan	Minister	Local Administration	2 April 1987	17 June 1991
V. Viswanatha Menon	Minister	Finance	2 April 1987	17 June 1991
M.P. Veerendra Kumar	Minister	Forests	2 April 1987	7 April 1987
N.M. Joseph	Minister	Forests	14 April 1987	17 June 1991

== See also ==
- List of chief ministers of Kerala
- Kerala Council of Ministers
