= First Nayanar ministry =

1980–81 government of Kerala, India

First Nayanar Ministry
- 11th Cabinet of Kerala
- 1980–81
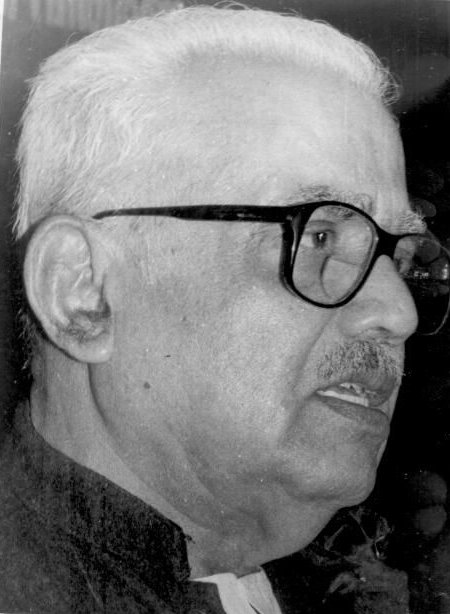
- E. K. Nayanar
- Date formed: 25 January 1980
- Date dissolved: 20 October 1981

People and organisations
- Head of government: E. K. Nayanar
- Member parties: LDF
- Status in legislature: Majority
- Opposition party: UDF
- Opposition leader: K. Karunakaran

History
- Election: 1980 election
- Predecessor: Koya ministry
- Successor: Second Karunakaran ministry

The Sixth Kerala Legislative Assembly Council of Ministers, first E. K. Nayanar ministry, was a Kerala Council of Ministers (Kerala Cabinet), the executive wing of Kerala state government, led by Communist Party leader E. K. Nayanar from 25 January 1980 to 20 October 1981. It had 17 ministries. Many of its ministers were from Congress (A), a party split off from the Indian National Congress (Urs) by A K Antony, when the Congress (Urs) was accused of rampant corruption.

Ideological differences among the ruling partners arose, culminating in the withdrawal of support to the ministry by the Congress (S). When the eight-member Kerala Congress (M) also withdrew support to the Government, Nayanar tendered resignation and President's rule was imposed.

The Kerala Council of Ministers, during Nayanar's first term as Chief Minister of Kerala, consisted of:

== Ministers ==
	Minister	Ministry	Notes
1	E.K. Nayanar	Chief Minister	
2	K. R. Gowri Amma	Minister for Agriculture and Social Welfare	
3	M. K. Krishnan	Minister for Harijan Welfare	
4	T.K. Ramakrishnan	Minister for Home Affairs	
5	E. Chandrasekharan Nair	Minister for Food, Civil Supplies and Housing	
6	P. S. Sreenivasan	Minister for Revenue and Fisheries	
7	A. Subba Rao	Minister for Irrigation	
8	Aryadan Muhammed	Minister for Labour and Forests	Resigned w. e. f. 16 October 1981
9	P. C. Chacko	Minister for Industries	Resigned w. e. f. 16 October 1981
10	Vakkom B. Purushothaman	Minister for Health and Tourism	Resigned w. e. f. 16 October 1981
11	A. C. Shanmughadas	Minister for Community Development and Sports	Resigned w. e. f. 16 October 1981
12	Baby John	Minister for Education	
13	R.S. Unni	Minister for Local Administration	
14	Lonappan Nambadan	Minister for Transport	
15	K.M. Mani	Minister for Finance and Law	
16	R. Balakrishna Pillai	Minister for Electricity	
17	P. M. Aboobacker	Minister for Public Works	

== See also ==
- List of chief ministers of Kerala
- List of Kerala ministers
