= Fourth Karunakaran ministry =

1991–95 government of Kerala, India

Fourth K. Karunakaran Ministry
- 15th Cabinet of Kerala
- 1991-95
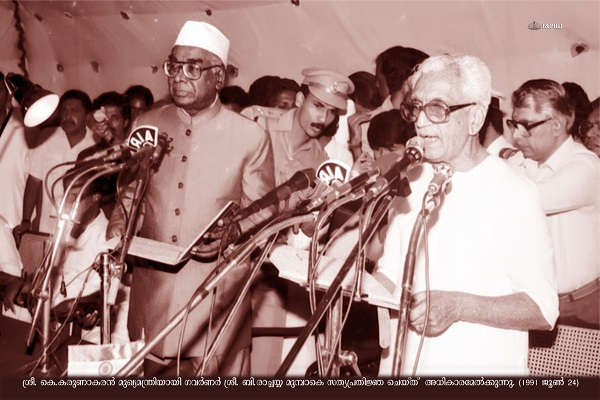
- Date formed: 24 June 1991
- Date dissolved: 16 March 1995

People and organisations
- Head of government: K. Karunakaran
- Member parties: UDF
- Status in legislature: Majority
- Opposition party: LDF
- Opposition leader: E. K. Nayanar (1991-92); V. S. Achuthanandan (1992-95)

History
- Election: 1991
- Predecessor: Second Nayanar ministry
- Successor: Second Antony ministry

The Ninth Kerala Legislative Assembly Council of Ministers in K. Karunakaran's fourth ministry, was a Kerala Council of Ministers (Kerala Cabinet), the executive wing of Kerala state government, led by Indian National Congress leader K. Karunakaran from 24 June 1991 to 16 March 1995. It comprised 18 ministers, all belonging to the United Democratic Front. The ministry was formed in the aftermath of the victory of the United Democratic Front in the 1991 assembly elections.

In March 1995, Karunakaran tendered his resignation from the post following dissent within the Congress party as well as the other constituents of the United Democratic Front. Subsequently, A. K. Antony took over as Chief Minister.

== Ministers ==
	Minister	Ministry
1	K. Karunakaran	Chief Minister (Also in charge of Home Affairs)
2	C. T. Ahammed Ali	Minister for Local Administration
3	R. Balakrishna Pillai	Minister for Transport
4	P. K. K. Bava	Minister for Public Works
5	P. P. George	Minister for Agriculture
6	T. M. Jacob	Minister for Irrigation & Culture
7	P. K. Kunhalikutty	Minister for Industries
8	K. M. Mani	Minister for Revenue and Law
9	E. T. Muhammed Basheer	Minister for Education
10	T. H. Musthafa	Minister for Food & Civil Supplies
11	Oommen Chandy	Minister for Finance (Resigned on 22 June 1994)
12	M. T. Padma	Minister for Fisheries
13	C. V. Padmarajan	Minister for Electricity and Coir
14	M. V. Raghavan	Minister for Co-operation
15	R. Ramachandran Nair	Minister for Health
16	N. Ramakrishnan	Minister for Labour
16	M. R. Raghuchandra Bal	Minister for Excise
17	Pandalam Sudhakaran	Minister for Welfare of Backward and Schedule Communities
18	K. P. Viswanathan	Minister for Forest & Wild Life

== See also ==
- Chief Ministers of Kerala
- Kerala Ministers
