= Cliff House, Thiruvananthapuram =

Official residence of the Chief Minister of Kerala

Coordinates: 8.5202777777778°N 76.953055555556°E

Cliff House
- Interactive map of the Cliff House area

General information
- Architectural style: Traditional Kerala
- Location: Thiruvananthapuram, Kerala, India
- Current tenants: V. D. Satheesan
- Construction started: 1939; 87 years ago
- Completed: 1942; 84 years ago
- Client: Chief Minister of Kerala

Technical details
- Floor area: 15,000 sq ft (1,400 m^{2})

Design and construction
- Architect: Travancore Royal Maramath

Cliff House is the official residence of the Chief Minister of Kerala, located at Nanthancode in the state capital Thiruvananthapuram. The Cliff House is part of Cliff House compound, which houses four other ministerial residences and is located within the state ministerial residential zone.

However, the house is a statutory-only official residence, as Indian laws and protocols do not stipulate that ministers live in any particular residence; rather the law defines the minister's actual residence, whether owned privately or by government, as the official residence. Cliff House is preferred as official residence by most of Chief Ministers of Kerala.

== History ==
Cliff House was constructed during the monarchy days of Travancore as the official residence of Diwan Peshkar (Secretary of the state) in charge of Devaswom affairs. Since the headquarters of Travancore Devaswom Office was commissioned at Nanthancode, it was decided to construct official residence of the Peshkar near to it. Post independence, the state PWD took over the house and surrounding land and refurnished as state Guest house. In 1956, it was reclassified as a ministerial residence.

When Kerala was formed in 1957, the first Chief Minister, E. M. S. Namboodiripad chose the house as his official residence, citing its location advantage, instead of Ross House, which were used by Chief Ministers of Travancore-Cochin.

Most of the Chief Ministers, choose Cliff House as their official residence, primarily motivated by its location. The house rose into a cult status as a center of power, during tenure of K. Karunakaran as Chief Minister. Since 1979, the house has unbroken history of being official residence of Kerala Chief Minister

== The Compound ==
The 4.2-acre campus known as Cliff House Compound, houses the main structure known as Cliff House apart from 4 other ministerial residence. The other 4 ministerial residences; Ushus, Ashoka, Nest, Pournami share common facilities of the compound.

=== The House ===
The two storied Cliff House is built in traditional Kerala architecture with slight influences of colonial English styles. The house has a built-up space of 15,000 sqft with 7 bedrooms apart from other quarters for official ministerial staff. Like any other Indian Official residences, no office facility is located inside the house as the house is meant for purely private use of Chief Minister and his family. However, a conference room is there inside Cliff House, mainly meant for informal meetings, though no cabinet meetings have ever been conducted here.

The house has 4 large verandas, with East Veranda being the largest. East Room is the main formal room where guests are welcomed, though, there are 2 other private formal rooms. A private office, library room, conference room and private staff offices are located in east side. A private living room and dining room are located in west side along other rooms. Most of the bedrooms are located in second floor.

Quarters for Ministerial staff like private secretaries, assistants, security staff etc. are built outside the main house

=== The Exterior ===
Cliff House compound is spread around 4.2 acres which also includes other ministerial residences. There are no formal gardens inside Cliff House, though a small lawn is well maintained in Eastern side where private tea-parties are conducted. A large part of land is used for farming, started during second tenure of E. K. Nayanar. K. Karunakaran's wife Kalyani ensured that a large vegetable garden is there in Cliff house for their private use, during Karunakaran's tenure as Chief Minister. During tenure of A. K. Antony as Chief Minister, he was much interested in setting up a banana farm. After K. Karunakaran met with an accident in early 1990s, a swimming pool was commissioned as advised by doctors for his better health. A security office is located inside the facility to garrison security officials.

== See also ==
- List of official residences of India
