= Second Karunakaran ministry =

1981–82 government of Kerala, India

Second K. Karunakaran Ministry
- 12th Cabinet of Kerala
- 1981–82
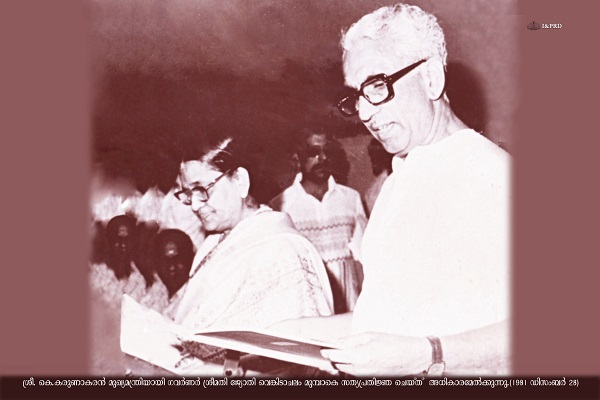
- Date established: 28 December 1981
- Date dissolved: 17 March 1982

Leadership and composition
- Head of government: K. Karunakaran
- Member parties: United Democratic Front
- Opposition party: Left Democratic Front
- Opposition leader: E. K. Nayanar

Formation and history
- Predecessor: First Nayanar ministry
- Successor: Third Karunakaran ministry

The Sixth Kerala Legislative Assembly Council of Ministers in K. Karunakaran's second ministry, was a Kerala Council of Ministers (Kerala Cabinet), the executive wing of Kerala state government, led by Indian National Congress leader K. Karunakaran from 28 December 1981 to 17 March 1982. It comprised 8 ministers, including Deputy Chief Minister C. H. Mohammed Koya.

The government was formed in the aftermath of the collapse of the Nayanar Ministry when the Congress(A) led by former Chief Minister A.K. Antony and the Kerala Congress (M) under Finance Minister K.M. Mani withdrawing support to the then CM E.K. Nayanar.

The Karunakaran-led ministry was a short-lived coalition government which lasted merely 80 days, with the Speaker having to cast his vote 8 times to save the government as both the treasury benches and the opposition were equally divided. Eventually the government fell on 17 March 1982 when Lonappan Nambadan, a member of Kerala Congress (M) withdrew his support for the ministry.

Subsequently, the assembly was dissolved and fresh elections were held in May 1982. The United Democratic Front returned to power under the leadership of K. Karunakaran who completed a full five year term in office.

== Ministers ==
The table below shows the list of ministers of the Second K. Karunakaran Ministry.

List of Ministers
Sl No.	Name	Ministry
1	K. Karunakaran	Chief Minister
2	C.H. Mohammed Koya	Deputy Chief Minister
3	P.J. Joseph	Minister for Revenue & Education
4	K.M. Mani	Minister for Finance & Law
5	Oommen Chandy	Minister for Home Affairs
6	Kadavoor Sivadasan	Minister for Labour
7	C.M. Sundaram	Minister for Local Administration
8	R. Sundaresan Nair	Minister for Health & Tourism

== See also ==
- List of chief ministers of Kerala
- Kerala Council of Ministers
