= Kerala Council of Ministers =

Indian state executive branch

- കേരള മന്ത്രിസഭ (Kēral̥a manṭrisabha)

Overview
- State: Kerala, India
- Leader: Chief minister
- Leader Name: V. D. Satheesan
- Appointed by: Governor of Kerala
- Ministries: 50
- Responsible to: Kerala Legislative Assembly
- Headquarters: Kerala Government Secretariat, Thiruvananthapuram
- Website: kerala.gov.in

The Kerala Council of Ministers is the supreme executive decision-making body of the Government of Kerala, headed by the Chief Minister of Kerala. It consists of members of the Kerala Legislature who are appointed as ministers by the Governor of Kerala on the advice of the Chief Minister to form the executive branch of the Government of Kerala. The ministers hold various portfolios and are responsible for the administration of their respective departments, as allocated by the Chief Minister.

The current state council of ministers were sworn in on 18 May 2026, following the 2026 Kerala Legislative Assembly election. The term of every executive wing is five years. The council of ministers are assisted by department secretaries attached to each ministry who are from the Kerala cadre of the IAS. The Chief Secretary to the Government act as the principal advisor to the Chief Minister and serve as the ex-officio secretary to the Council of Ministers. The chief executive officer responsible for issuing orders on behalf of the Government is the Chief Secretary to the State Government, currently A. Jayathilak, who assumed office on 24 April 2025.

The Kerala Council of Ministers along with the other elected legislative members assemble at the Kerala Legislative Assembly to introduce new drafts of law (otherwise known as bills), discuss them with other elected members of the assembly, revise the drafts for edits if necessary. A bill once finalised is sent to vote on the floor of the house of Kerala Legislative Assembly and if the bill receives the majority vote, it becomes a binding law else it is rejected and the existing law continues. The members of the Legislative Assembly together also makes the Council of Ministers and the Chief Minister accountable on behalf of the people, for any misuse of executive powers vested with them.

The Kerala Council of Ministers is accountable to periodically evaluate the existing law of the land and ensures they are in the best interest of the society at large, which they represent under a democratic system. Kerala State Governor is also regarded as a member of the Legislative Assembly and may suspend or dissolve when no coalition is able to muster a working majority).

== Constitutional requirement ==
=== For the Council of Ministers to aid and advise Governor ===
According to Article 163 of the Constitution of India,

There shall be a Council of Ministers with the Chief Minister at the head to aid and advise the Governor in the exercise of his function, except in so far as he is by or under this Constitution required to exercise his functions or any of them in his discretion.

1. If any question arises whether any matter is or is not a matter as respects which the Governor is by or under this Constitution required to act in his discretion, the decision of the Governor in his discretion shall be final, and the validity of anything done by the Governor shall not be called in question on the ground that he ought or ought not to have acted in his discretion.
2. The question whether any, and if so what, advice was tendered by Ministers to the Governor shall not be inquired into in any court.

This means that the Ministers serve under the pleasure of the Governor and he/she may remove them, on the advice of the Chief Minister, whenever they want.

=== For other provisions as to Ministers ===
According to Article 164 of the Constitution of India,

The Chief Minister shall be appointed by the Governor and the other Ministers shall be appointed by the Governor on the advice of the Chief Minister, and the Minister shall hold office during the pleasure of the Governor:
Provided that in the States of Bihar, Madhya Pradesh and Orissa, there shall be a Minister in charge of tribal welfare who may in addition be in charge of the welfare of the Scheduled Castes and backward classes or any other work.

1. The Council of Minister shall be collectively responsible to the Legislative Assembly of the State.
2. Before a Minister enters upon his office, the Governor shall administer to him the oaths of office and of secrecy according to the forms set out for the purpose in the Third Schedule.
3. A Minister who for any period of six consecutive months is not a member of the Legislature of the State shall at the expiration of that period cease to be a Minister.
4. The salaries and allowances of Ministers shall be such as the Legislature of the State may from time to time by law determine and, until the Legislature of the State so determines, shall be a specified in the Second Schedule.

== Present Council of Ministers ==
The Chief Minister V. D. Satheesan assumed office for his first term on 18 May 2026. The oath-taking ceremony was held at the Central Stadium in Thiruvananthapuram. The Governor of Kerala Rajendra Vishwanath Arlekar administered the oath of office and secrecy to the members of the Council of Ministers.

| S.No | Name | Portrait | Constituency | Designation | Portfolios | Party |
Chief Minister
| 1. | V. D. Satheesan | Satheeshan.V.D.UDF | Paravur | Chief Minister | General Administration; Finance; Law; Ports; All India Services (IAS, IPS, IFS); Personnel and Administrative Reforms; Election; Disaster Management; Administration of Civil & Criminal Justice; Planning and Economic Affairs; State Goods and Services Tax; Treasury; State Audit; National Savings; State Insurance Department; Stamps and Stamp Duties; Kerala Financial Corporation; Kerala State Financial Enterprises; Non-Resident Keralites Affairs; Distress Relief; Airports; Metro Rail; Railways; Inter-State River Waters; Coastal Shipping and Inland Navigation; Kerala Shipping and Inland Navigation Corporation; Information and Public Relations; Printing and Stationary; Science; Technology; Scientific Institutes; Senior Citizens’ Weflare; Pollution Control; Sainik Welfare; State Hospitality; Integration; Rajiv Gandhi Centre for Biotechnology; National University of Advanced Legal Studies (NUALS); Rajiv Gandhi Academy for Aviation Technology; Posts & Telegraphs; Public Procurement Advisory Department; Khadi and Village Industries; State Lotteries; Agricultural Income Tax; All important policy decisions; Other unallocated portfolios | INC |
Cabinet ministers
| 2. | Ramesh Chennithala | | Haripad | Minister for Home, Vigilance and Coir | Home; Vigilance; Prisons; Fire and Rescue Services; Coir | INC |
| 3. | K. Muraleedharan | | Vattiyoorkavu | Minister for Health and Family Welfare, and Devaswom | Health; Family Welfare; Ayush; Devaswom; Medical Education; Medical University; Indigenous Medicine; Drugs Control; Food Safety | INC |
| 4. | Sunny Joseph | | Peravoor | Minister for Electricity, Environment and Parliamentary Affairs | Electricity; Environment; Parliamentary Affairs; ANERT | INC |
| 5. | Shibu Baby John | | Chavara | Minister for Forests and Wild Life, and Skill Development | Forests & Wildlife Protection; Skill Development; Kerala Academy for Skills Excellence (KASE); Employment and Training; Cashew Industry | RSP |
| 6. | Mons Joseph | | Kaduthuruthy | Minister for Water Resources and Housing | Irrigation; Command Area Development Authority (CADA); Ground Water Development; Water Supply & Sanitation; Housing | KEC |
| 7. | Anoop Jacob | | Piravom | Minister for Food, Civil Supplies, and Consumer Affairs | Food, Civil Supplies; Consumer Affairs; Legal Metrology | KC(J) |
| 8. | P. K. Kunhalikutty | | Malappuram | Minister for Industries and Information Technology | Industries and Commerce; Information Technology; Artificial Intelligence; Start Ups; Mining and Geology; Handlooms & Textiles; Plantation Directorate; Industrial Co-operatives; Kerala University of Digital Sciences | IUML |
| 9. | C. P. John | | Thiruvananthapuram | Minister for Transport | Road Transport; Motor Vehicles; Water Transport | CMP |
| 10. | A. P. Anil Kumar | A.P._Anil_Kumar | Wandoor | Minister for Revenue | Land Revenue; Survey and Land Records; Land Reforms | INC |
| 11. | N. Samsudheen | | Mannarkkad | Minister for General Education and Minority Welfare | General Education; Minority Welfare; Literacy Movement; Waqf Hajj Pilgrimage | IUML |
| 12. | Roji M. John | | Angamaly | Minister for Higher Education | Collegiate Education; Technical Education; Universities (Except Agriculture, Veterinary, Fisheries, Medical and Digital Universities); Entrance Examination; National Cadet Corps; Additional Skill Acquisition Programme (ASAP) Kerala | INC |
| 13. | P. C. Vishnunadh | | Kundara | Minister for Tourism and Culture | Tourism; Culture; Kerala State Film Development Corporation; Kerala State Chalachithra Academy; Kerala Cultural Activists Welfare Fund Board | INC |
| 14. | Bindhu Krishna | | Kollam | Minister for Labour, Dairy Development, Women and Child Development, and Animal Husbandry | Labour; Dairy Development & Milk Co-Operatives; Women & Child Development; Animal Husbandry; Kerala Veterinary & Animal Sciences University; Rehabilitation; Factories and Boilers; Insurance Medical Service; Industrial Tribunals; Labour Courts | INC |
| 15. | M. Liju | | Kayamkulam | Minister for Excise and Co-operation | Excise; Co-operation | INC |
| 16. | K. M. Shaji | | Vengara | Minister for Local Self Governments | Local Self Government–Panchayat, Municipality and Corporation; Town Planning; Rural Development; Regional Development Authorities; Kerala Institute of Local Administration (KILA) | IUML |
| 17. | P. K. Basheer | | Eranad | Minister for Public Works | Public Works Department (PWD) | IUML |
| 18. | V. E. Abdul Gafoor | | Kalamassery | Minister for Fisheries and Social Justice | Fisheries; Harbour Engineering; Social Justice; Kerala University of Fisheries and Ocean Studies | IUML |
| 19. | T. Siddique | | Kalpetta | Minister for Agriculture | Agriculture; Soil Survey & Soil Conservation; Kerala Agricultural University; Warehousing Corporation | INC |
| 20. | K. A. Thulasi | | Kongad | Minister for Welfare of Scheduled Castes, Scheduled Tribes, and Backward Classes | Scheduled Castes Development; Scheduled Tribes Development; Backward Classes Development | INC |
| 21. | O. J. Janeesh | | Kodungallur | Minister for Sports, Youth Affairs, Registration and Archaeology | Youth Affairs; Sports; Zoos; Museum; Registration; Archaeology; Archives | INC |

== List of cabinets of Kerala ==
| No | Mandate | Cabinet | Chief minister | Term of office | Party of the CM | Ruling coalition |
|---|---|---|---|---|---|---|
| 1 | 1957 | Namboodiripad Ⅰ | E. M. S. Namboodiripad | 5 April 1957–31 July 1959 | CPI | — |
| 2 | 1960 | Pattom Ⅰ | Pattom Thanu Pillai | 22 February 1960–26 September 1962 | PSP | Joint Front |
| 3 | 1960 | Sankar Ⅰ | R. Sankar | 26 September 1962–10 September 1964 | INC | — |
| | 1965 | | No ministry formed | | | |
| 4 | 1967 | Namboodiripad ⅠⅠ | E. M. S. Namboodiripad | 6 March 1967–1 November 1969 | CPI(M) | United Front (Seven Party Alliance) or United Left Front |
| 5 | 1967 | Achutha Menon Ⅰ | C. Achutha Menon | 1 November 1969–1 August 1970 | CPI | Mini Front/Democratic Front |
| 6 | 1970 | Achutha Menon ⅠⅠ | C. Achutha Menon | 4 October 1970–25 March 1977 | CPI | United Front/Maxi Front |
| 7 | 1977 | Karunakaran Ⅰ | K. Karunakaran | 25 March 1977–25 April 1977 | INC | United Front/Ruling Front |
| 8 | | Antony Ⅰ | A. K. Antony | 27 April 1977–27 October 1978 | INC | United Front/Ruling Front |
| 9 | | Vasudevan Nair Ⅰ | P. K. Vasudevan Nair | 29 October 1978–7 October 1979 | CPI | United Front/Ruling Front |
| 10 | 1977 | Koya Ⅰ | C. H. Mohammed Koya | 12 October 1979–1 December 1979 | IUML | — |
| 11 | 1980 | Nayanar Ⅰ | E. K. Nayanar | 25 January 1980–20 October 1981 | CPI(M) | LDF |
| 12 | 1980 | Karunakaran ⅠⅠ | K. Karunakaran | 28 December 1981–17 March 1982 | INC | UDF |
| 13 | 1982 | Karunakaran ⅠⅠⅠ | K. Karunakaran | 24 May 1982–25 March 1987 | INC | UDF |
| 14 | 1987 | Nayanar ⅠⅠ | E. K. Nayanar | 26 March 1987–17 June 1991 | CPI(M) | LDF |
| 15 | 1991 | Karunakaran Ⅳ | K. Karunakaran | 24 June 1991–16 March 1995 | INC | UDF |
| 16 | | Antony ⅠⅠ | A. K. Antony | 22 March 1995–9 May 1996 | INC | UDF |
| 17 | 1996 | Nayanar ⅠⅠⅠ | E. K. Nayanar | 20 May 1996–13 May 2001 | CPI(M) | LDF |
| 18 | 2001 | Antony ⅠⅠⅠ | A. K. Antony | 17 May 2001–29 August 2004 | INC | UDF |
| 19 | 2004 | Chandy Ⅰ | Oommen Chandy | 31 August 2004–18 May 2006 | INC | UDF |
| 20 | 2006 | Achuthanandan Ⅰ | V. S. Achuthanandan | 18 May 2006–18 May 2011 | CPI(M) | LDF |
| 21 | 2011 | Chandy ⅠⅠ | Oommen Chandy | 18 May 2011–20 May 2016 | INC | UDF |
| 22 | 2016 | Vijayan Ⅰ | Pinarayi Vijayan | 25 May 2016–19 May 2021 | CPI(M) | LDF |
| 23 | 2021 | Vijayan ⅠⅠ | Pinarayi Vijayan | 20 May 2021–18 May 2026 | CPI(M) | LDF |
| 24 | 2026 | Satheesan Ⅰ | V. D. Satheesan | 18 May 2026–present | INC | UDF |

== Oath of office and secrecy of the chief minister and ministers of Kerala ==
The following are the forms of oath or affirmation administered to the chief minister and ministers of Kerala under the Third Schedule to the Constitution of India.

== Oath of Office (English) ==
"I, A.B., do swear in the name of God / solemnly affirm that I will bear true faith and allegiance to the Constitution of India as by law established, that I will uphold the sovereignty and integrity of India, that I will faithfully and conscientiously discharge my duties as the Chief Minister / a Minister for the State of Kerala and that I will do right to all manner of people in accordance with the Constitution and the law without fear or favour, affection or ill-will."

— Third Schedule to the Constitution of India

== (മലയാളം) ==
"A.B. എന്ന ഞാൻ, നിയമം മൂലം സ്ഥാപിതമായ ഭാരതത്തിൻ്റെ ഭരണഘടനയോട് യഥാർത്ഥമായ വിശ്വാസവും കൂറും പുലർത്തുമെന്നും, ഭാരതത്തിൻ്റെ പരമാധികാരവും അഖണ്ഡതയും നിലനിർത്തുമെന്നും, കേരള സംസ്ഥാന മുഖ്യമന്ത്രിയായി / മന്ത്രിയായി എൻ്റെ കർത്തവ്യങ്ങൾ വിശ്വസ്തതയോടും മനഃസാക്ഷിയോടും കൂടി നിർവ്വഹിക്കുമെന്നും, ഭയമോ പക്ഷപാതമോ സ്നേഹമോ വിദ്വേഷമോ കൂടാതെ, ഭരണഘടനയ്ക്കും നിയമത്തിനും അനുസൃതമായി എല്ലാ ജനങ്ങൾക്കും നേരെ ഞാൻ നീതി പുലർത്തുമെന്നും, ദൈവനാമത്തിൽ സത്യം ചെയ്യുന്നു / ഗൗരവമായി പ്രതിജ്ഞ ചെയ്യുന്നു.

== Oath of Secrecy (English) ==
"I, A.B., do swear in the name of God / solemnly affirm that I will not directly or indirectly communicate or reveal to any person or persons any matter which shall be brought under my consideration or shall become known to me as the Chief Minister / a Minister for the State of Kerala except as may be required for the faithful discharge of my duties as such Chief Minister / Minister."

— Third Schedule to the Constitution of India

== (മലയാളം) ==
"A.B. എന്ന ഞാൻ, കേരള സംസ്ഥാന മുഖ്യമന്ത്രിയായി / മന്ത്രിയായി എനിക്ക് പരിഗണനയ്ക്കായി കൊണ്ടുവരികയോ എനിക്ക് അറിവിൽ പെടുകയോ ചെയ്യുന്ന ഏതൊരു കാര്യവും, മുഖ്യമന്ത്രിയെന്ന / മന്ത്രിയെന്ന നിലയിൽ എൻ്റെ കർത്തവ്യങ്ങൾ നിർവ്വഹിക്കുന്നതിന് ആവശ്യമുള്ളതൊഴികെ, നേരിട്ടോ അല്ലാതെയോ ഏതെങ്കിലും വ്യക്തിക്കോ വ്യക്തികൾക്കോ വെളിപ്പെടുത്തുകയില്ലെന്നും, വെളിപ്പെടുത്തിക്കൊടുക്കുകയില്ലെന്നും, ദൈവനാമത്തിൽ സത്യം ചെയ്യുന്നു / ഗൗരവമായി പ്രതിജ്ഞ ചെയ്യുന്നു."

— ഇന്ത്യൻ ഭരണഘടനയുടെ മൂന്നാം ഷെഡ്യൂൾ

== See also ==
- List of chief ministers of Kerala
- List of MPs from Kerala
