= K. R. Gouri Amma =

Indian politician (1919–2021)

K. R. Gouri
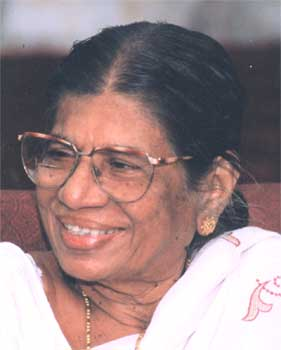
- K. R. Gouri

Travancore-Cochin Legislative Assembly
- In office 1952–1953
- Constituency: Cherthala

Travancore-Cochin Legislative Assembly
- In office 1954–1956
- Rajpramukh: Chithira Thirunal Balarama Varma
- Constituency: Cherthala

1st Revenue Minister of Kerala
- In office 5 April 1957 – 31 July 1959
- Governor: Burgula Ramakrishna Rao
- Succeeded by: K. Chandrasekharan
- Constituency: Cherthala

Minister for Revenue, Food and Civil Supplies
- In office 6 March 1967 – 1 November 1969
- Governor: V. Viswanathan
- Preceded by: K. Chandrasekharan
- Succeeded by: K. T. Jacob
- Constituency: Cherthala

Minister for Agriculture and Social Welfare
- In office 25 January 1980 – 20 October 1981
- Governor: Jothi Venkatachalam
- Constituency: Aroor

Minister for Industries and Social Welfare
- In office 26 March 1987 – 17 June 1991
- Governor: P. Ramachandran
- Preceded by: P. K. Kunhalikutty
- Succeeded by: E. Ahamed
- Constituency: Aroor

Minister for Agriculture
- In office 17 May 2001 – 29 August 2004
- Governor: Sukhdev Singh Kang
- Preceded by: Krishnan Kaniyamparambil
- Constituency: Aroor

Minister for Agriculture
- In office 31 August 2004 – 12 May 2006
- Governor: R. L. Bhatia
- Succeeded by: Mullakkara Retnakaran
- Constituency: Aroor

General Secretary of Janadhipathya Samrakshana Samithi
- In office 30 March 1994 – 31 January 2021

Personal details
- Born: Kalathilparambil Raman Gouri; 14 July 1919 Pattanakkad, (near Cherthala), Travancore, British India (now Alappuzha, Kerala, India)
- Died: 11 May 2021 (aged 101) Thiruvananthapuram, Kerala
- Party: JSS
- Other political affiliations: CPI (1948–1964); CPI(M) (1964–1994)
- Spouse: T. V. Thomas (estranged)
- Relatives: Susheela Gopalan
- Education: Maharaja's College, Ernakulam; St. Teresa's College, Ernakulam; Government Law College, Thiruvananthapuram
- Awards: Kerala Sahitya Academy Award
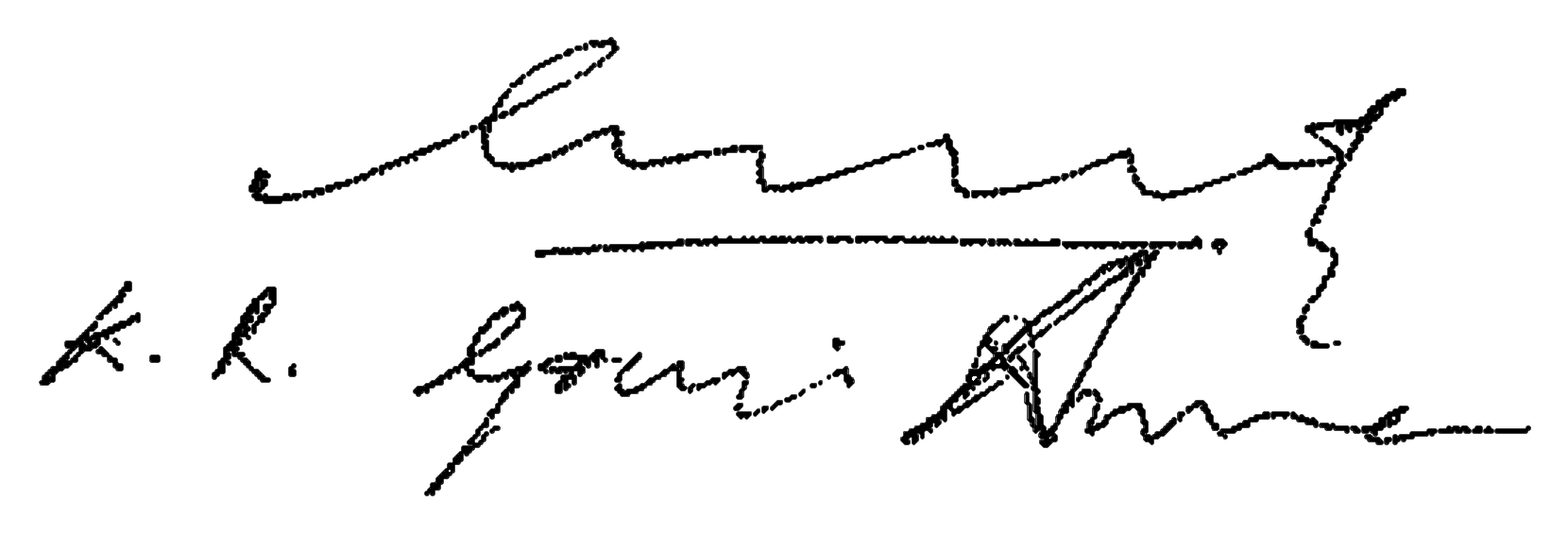
- Signature
- Website: Government of Kerala
- Nickname: Gouri Amma

K. R. Gouri (14 July 1919 – 11 May 2021), born Kalathilparambil Raman Gouri, commonly known as Gouri Amma, was an Indian politician from Alappuzha in central Kerala. She was one of the most prominent leaders of the Left movement in India.

Born near Cherthala, K. R. Gouri studied at Maharaja's College and Government Law College, Thiruvananthapuram. Refusing an offer from the Government of Travancore to be appointed a magistrate, she joined the Communist Party in 1948. She was elected to Travancore-Cochin Legislative Assembly in 1952 and 1954. She served as the Land Revenue or Social Welfare minister in the 1957, 1967 (Namboodiripad), 1980 and 1987 (Nayanar) Kerala ministries. As the Revenue Minister in the first Kerala ministry, she famously piloted the Kerala Agrarian Relations Bill.

K. R. Gouri was expelled from Communist Party of India Marxist in 1994, and subsequently became a minister in the Congress-led Kerala Cabinet from 2001 to 2006.

== Early life ==
=== Early career ===
K. R. Gouri was born on 14 July 1919 to K. A. Raman and Parvathi Amma in a wealthy Ezhava family in Alappuzha, Travancore. She studied at Maharaja's College, Ernakulam and St. Teresa's College, Ernakulam (Graduation in History). She obtained her law degree (B. L.) from Government Law College, Thiruvananthapuram and enrolled as an advocate at Sherthalai.

Gouri was the first woman from the Ezhava community to get a degree in law. She famously refused an offer from C. P. Ramaswami Aiyar, the then-Diwan of Travancore, to be appointed a government magistrate.

She married her colleague T. V. Thomas in 1957 who at that time had a surviving legally married wife and son. The couple was later estranged.

=== In Travancore politics ===
K. R. Gouri started her public life with the Quit India Movement and later joined the agitation for the merger Travancore with the state of India. She joined the Communist Party in 1948 (by this period, she had started working for the Party among coir workers in Alappuzha). She unsuccessfully ran for office from Sherthalai Constituency in the 1948 Travancore elections. Subsequently, she underwent imprisonment and endured severe police torture.

She was elected to the Travancore-Cochin Legislative Assembly in 1952 and 1954 (she was in prison throughout the election period).

== In Kerala politics ==
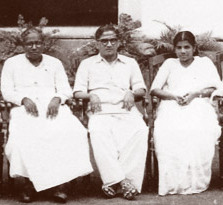
E. M. S. Namboodiripad, C. Achutha Menon and K. R. Gouri in 1957

=== In the first Kerala ministry ===
The state of Kerala was constituted on 1 November 1956 (States Reorganization Act). In 1957, the Communist Party of India defeated the Indian National Congress in the first Kerala Legislative Assembly elections and, under E. M. S. Namboodiripad, formed the first non-Congress government in independent India. K. R. Gouri, member from Sherthalai, was chosen as the Revenue Minister.

=== Kerala Agrarian Relations Bill ===
As the Revenue Minister in the first Kerala ministry, K. R. Gouri piloted the Kerala Agrarian Relations Bill in December, 1957. Two major aims of the legislation introduced were the abolition of tenancy and the security for landless agriculture labourers or the hut dwellers. The bill gave tenants the right to buy their land from the owner at a price set by regulations, placed ceilings on the amount of land a family could own, established procedures for determining a fair rent, made illegal any evictions after the formation of Kerala and set up Land Tribunals in every taluk.

The Kerala Assembly passed the bill on 10 June 1959. The President refused to assent the bill and sent it back with recommendations. The new Congress-led alliance government passed the amended bill as Agrarian Relations Act in 1960 (which was declared unconstitutional by the Kerala High Court in 1963).

=== Split in the Party ===
In 1964, ideological differences over a split between the Soviets and the Chinese communists and over the response to the 1962 India-China war prompted a large faction of party members to break with the Communist Party of India and form the Communist Party of India Marxist. After the split of 1964, K. R. Gouri joined the newly formed Communist Party of India Marxist.

=== With the Communist Party of India Marxist ===
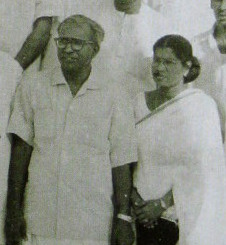
E. M. S. Namboodiripad and K. R. Gouri in 1967

In 1967 assembly elections resulted in the formation of the Communist Party of India Marxist-led United Front government in Kerala (Second Namboodiripad ministry). K. R. Gouri, a member from Aroor, was chosen as Minister for Revenue, Social Welfare and Law. She served from March 1967 to November 1969.

From 25 January 1980 till 20 October 1981 K. R. Gouri served as Minister for Agriculture, Social Welfare, Industries, Vigilance and Justice Administration in the first E. K. Nayanar ministry.

=== 1987 assembly elections ===
The Left Democratic Front projected K. R. Gouri as the Chief Minister designate in the 1987 election assembly campaign. But once the alliance emerged victorious, the party chose veteran leader E. K. Nayanar instead.

In the Second E. K. Nayanar ministry (1987–1991), K. R. Gouri served as Minister for Industries and Social Welfare, Vigilance and Administration of Justice.

== With the Congress Party ==
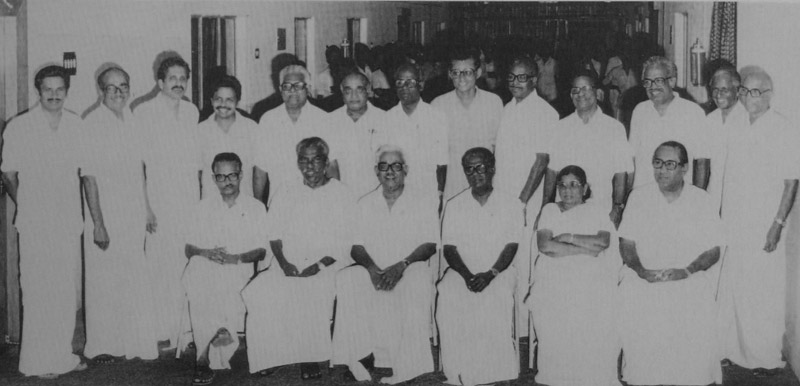
Kerala Council of Ministers (1987)

K. R. Gouri was expelled from Communist Party of India Marxist in 1994. She founded Janadhipathya Samrakshana Samithi (the J. S. S.) in 1994, which later became a member of the Congress-led anti-Marxist alliance United Democratic Front.

=== Minister in the Congress ministries ===
K. R. Gouri served as the Minister of Agriculture in the third A. K. Antony ministry (May 2001 – August 2004). She also a served as the Minister of Agriculture, Soil Conservation, Soil Survey, Warehousing Corporation, Dairy Development, Milk Co-operatives, Agricultural University, Animal Husbandry and Coir in the first Chandy ministry (August 2004 – May 2006).

=== Later years ===
Gouri published her autobiography titled Athmakatha, which won the Kerala Sahitya Academy Award for best Autobiography/Biography in 2011.

K. R. Gouri died on 11 May 2021. She was cremated at the Valiya Chudukad in Alappuzha.

== Positions held ==
- Kerala State Secretariat Member, Communist Party of India Marxist.
- Chairman, Committee on Government Assurances (1960–61)
- Chairman, Public Accounts Committee (1986–87)
- President, Kerala Karshaka Sangam (1960–84)
- President, Kerala Mahila Sangam (from 1967–76)
- Secretary, Kerala Mahila Sangam (1976–87)

== In popular culture ==
=== Films ===
- Lal Salam (1990), co-written by Cheriyan Kalpakavadi and directed by Venu Nagavalli.
- Chief Minister K. R. Gowthami (1994), written by Salim Cherthala and directed by Babu Raj (Babu Cherthala)
