= K. Sankaranarayana Pillai =

Indian politician (1945–2021)

K.Sankaranarayana Pillai

Personal details
- Born: 3 November 1945 British Raj
- Died: 19 July 2021 (aged 75)
- Party: Indian Congress (Socialist)

K. Sankaranarayana Pillai (3 November 1945 – 19 July 2021) was an Indian politician who was the Minister for Transport in Kerala from 2 April 1987 to 17 June 1991 in the Second E. K. Nayanar ministry. He was elected to the Kerala Legislative Assembly from the Thiruvananthapuram East constituency in 1982 and 1987.
