= Chief Minister of Kerala =

Leader of the executive branch of Government of Kerala

- Kēraḷa Mukhyamantri
- Emblem of Kerala

- Flag of India

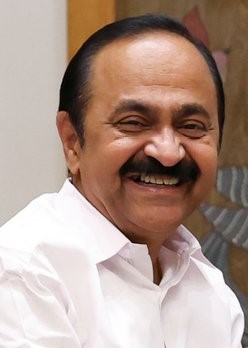
- Incumbent; V. D. Satheesan since 18 May 2026
- Chief Minister's Office; Government of Kerala
- Style: The Honourable
- Type: Leader of the Executive
- Status: Head of government
- Abbreviation: CMOK
- Member of: State Cabinet; Legislative Assembly
- Reports to: Governor of Kerala; Kerala Legislative Assembly
- Residence: Cliff House, Thiruvananthapuram
- Seat: State Secretariat, Thiruvananthapuram
- Nominator: Members of the Kerala Legislative Assembly
- Appointer: Governor of Kerala; by convention, based on appointee's ability to command confidence in the Niyama Sabha
- Term length: At the pleasure of the governor of Kerala; Niyama Sabha term is 5 years unless dissolved sooner; No term limits specified
- Constituting instrument: Article 164 of the Constitution of India
- Precursor: Prime Minister of Travancore; Prime Minister of Kingdom of Cochin; Chief Minister of Madras; Chief Minister of Travancore-Cochin
- Formation: 5 April 1957; 69 years ago
- First holder: E. M. S. Namboodiripad (1957–1959)
- Deputy: Deputy Chief Minister of Kerala
- Salary: ₹185,000 (US$2,000)/monthly; ₹2,220,000 (US$24,000)/annually
- Website: keralacm.gov.in

The Chief Minister of Kerala is the head of government of the Indian state of Kerala. As per the Constitution of India, the state's governor is the state's de jure head, and the de facto executive authority rests with the chief minister. Following elections to the Kerala Legislative Assembly, the governor usually invites the party (or coalition) with a majority of seats to form the government. The governor appoints the chief minister, whose council of ministers are collectively responsible to the assembly. Given that he has the confidence of the assembly, the chief minister's term is for five years and is subject to no term limits. Usually, the chief minister also serves as leader of the house in the legislative assembly.

Following India's independence from the British Raj in 1947, the states' monarchs of Travancore (Thiruvithāmkōr) and Cochin (Kochi) instituted a measure of representative government, headed by a prime minister and his council of ministers. On 1 July 1949, Travancore and Cochin were merged to form Travancore-Cochin state. The Malabar and Kasaragod region of South Canara, which together constitute more than half of present state of Kerala, had their representatives in the Madras Legislative Assembly. On 1 November 1956, the States Reorganisation Act redrew India's map along linguistic lines, and the present-day state of Kerala was born, consisting of Malayalam-speaking regions, by merging the Malabar, and Kasaragod districts with Travancore-Cochin.

The first assembly election in Kerala was held in February–March 1957, and the first Kerala Legislative Assembly was formed on 5 April 1957. The assembly had 127 members including a nominated member. E. M. S. Namboodiripad of the Communist Party of India, was the first chief minister, and his tenure was cut short by the imposition of President's rule. Since then, 12 people have served as the chief minister of Kerala. E. K. Nayanar held the office for 10 years and 353 days, and is the longest serving holder of the office. Karunakaran was sworn in as the chief minister four times. A. K. Antony was the youngest to hold the office at age of 36 years, and V. S. Achuthanandan was the oldest to be sworn in at the age of 82 years. On four occasions, non-MLAs were sworn in as Chief Minister, C. Achutha Menon in 1969, A. K. Antony in 1977 and 1995, and E. K. Nayanar in 1996; they were subsequently elected to the Legislative Assembly through by-elections within the stipulated period of six months. The state has come under President's rule seven times, with the last of them occurring in 1982. Since the 1980s, the office of the chief minister has generally alternated between the leaders of the Indian National Congress and Communist Party of India (Marxist). V. D. Satheesan is the current chief minister since 18 May 2026.

== Predecessors (pre 1957) ==
- ^{†} Assassinated or died in office
- ^{§} Returned to office after a previous non-consecutive term
- ^{RES} Resigned
- ^{NC} Resigned following a no-confidence motion

=== Prime ministers of Travancore (1948–49) ===
No (Note: A parenthetical number indicates that the incumbent has previously held office.)	Portrait	Name	Term of Office			Assembly	Appointed by (Monarch)	Party
1		Pattom A. Thanu Pillai	24 March 1948	17 October 1948	210 days	Representative Body (1948–49)	Chithira Thirunal Balarama Varma	Indian National Congress
2		Paravoor T. K. Narayana Pillai	22 October 1948	1 July 1949	253 days	Representative Body (1948–49)	Chithira Thirunal Balarama Varma	Indian National Congress

=== Prime ministers of Cochin (1947–49) ===
No	Portrait	Name	Term of Office			Assembly	Appointed by (Monarch)	Party
1		P. Govinda Menon	14 August 1947	22 October 1947	51 days	6th Council (1945–48)	Aikya Keralam Thampuran	Independent
2		T. K. Nair	27 October 1947	20 September 1948	334 days	6th Council (1945–48)	Aikya Keralam Thampuran	Independent
3		E. Ikkanda Warrier	20 September 1948	1 July 1949	284 days	Legislative Assembly (1948–49)	Aikya Keralam Thampuran	Independent

=== Prime ministers of Travancore-Cochin (1949–50) ===
No	Portrait	Name	Term of Office			Assembly	Appointed by (Rajpramukh)	Party
1		Paravoor T. K. Narayana Pillai	1 July 1949	26 January 1950	209 days	1st	Chithira Thirunal Balarama Varma	Indian National Congress

=== Chief ministers of Travancore-Cochin (1950–56) ===
After India's independence in 1947, Travancore and Cochin were merged to form Travancore-Cochin on 1 July 1949. On 1 January 1950, Travancore-Cochin was recognised as a state.

No	Portrait	Name	Term of Office			Assembly	Appointed by (Rajpramukh)	Party
1		Paravoor T. K. Narayana Pillai	26 January 1950	28 February 1951	1 year, 33 days	1st	Chithira Thirunal Balarama Varma	Indian National Congress
2		C. Kesavan	28 February 1951	12 March 1952	1 year, 13 days	1st	Chithira Thirunal Balarama Varma	Indian National Congress
3		A. J. John	12 March 1952	16 March 1954	2 years, 4 days	2nd (1951 election)	Chithira Thirunal Balarama Varma	Indian National Congress
4		Pattom A. Thanu Pillai	16 March 1954	10 February 1955	331 days	3rd (1954 election)	Chithira Thirunal Balarama Varma	Praja Socialist Party
5		P. Govinda Menon	10 February 1955	23 March 1956	1 year, 42 days	3rd (1954 election)	Chithira Thirunal Balarama Varma	Indian National Congress
–		Vacant (Note: President's rule may be imposed when the "government in a state is not able to function as per the Constitution", which often happens because no party or coalition has a majority in the assembly. When President's rule is in force in a state, its council of ministers stands dissolved. The office of chief minister thus lies vacant, and the administration is taken over by the governor, who functions on behalf of the central government. At times, the legislative assembly also stands dissolved.) (President's rule)	23 March 1956	31 October 1956	222 days	Dissolved	N/A	

== List of chief ministers (1957–present) ==
On 1 November 1956, Government of India enacted the States Reorganisation Act, 1956 by which a new Kerala state was formed by the merger of Travancore-Cochin state with the Malabar district and Kasaragod taluk of South Canara district of the Madras State. The southern part of Travancore-Cochin, Kanyakumari district, along with Sengottai Taluk was transferred to Madras state and the Laccadive and Minicoy Islands were separated from Malabar district to form a new Union Territory. A new Legislative Assembly was also created, for which elections were held in 1957.

No	Portrait	Name (Note: Year in parentheses indicates life span)	Constituency	Tenure			Assembly (election)	Ministry	Party (Note: This column only names the chief minister's party. The state government he heads may be a complex coalition of several parties and independents; these are not listed here.)
		Vacant (President's rule)	N/A	1 November 1956	5 April 1957	155 days	Dissolved	N/A	
1		E. M. S. Namboodiripad	Nileshwaram	5 April 1957	31 July 1959	2 years, 117 days	1st (1957 election)	EMS I	Communist Party of India
		Vacant (President's rule)	N/A	31 July 1959	22 February 1960	206 days	Dissolved	N/A	
2		P. A. Thanu Pillai	Thiruvananthapuram II	22 February 1960	26 September 1962	2 years, 216 days	2nd (1960 election)	Pattom	Praja Socialist Party
3		R. Sankar	Kannur I	26 September 1962	10 September 1964	1 year, 350 days	2nd (1960 election)	Sankar	Indian National Congress
		Vacant (President's rule)	N/A	10 September 1964	25 March 1965	2 years, 177 days	Dissolved	N/A	
		Vacant (President's rule)	N/A	25 March 1965	6 March 1967	2 years, 177 days	Dissolved (1965 election) (Note: As the 1965 election did not deliver a clear mandate in favour of any party or coalition, no assembly was convened, and President's rule was re-imposed.)	N/A	
(1)		E. M. S. Namboodiripad	Pattambi	6 March 1967	1 November 1969	2 years, 240 days	3rd (1967 election)	EMS II	Communist Party of India (Marxist)
4		C. Achutha Menon	Kottarakkara	1 November 1969	3 August 1970	275 days	3rd (1967 election)	Achutha Menon I	Communist Party of India
		Vacant (President's rule)	N/A	4 August 1970	3 October 1970	60 days	Dissolved	N/A	
(4)		C. Achutha Menon	Kodakara	4 October 1970	25 March 1977	6 years, 172 days	4th (1970 election)	Achutha Menon II	Communist Party of India
5		K. Karunakaran	Mala	25 March 1977	27 April 1977	33 days	5th (1977 election)	Karunakaran I	Indian National Congress
6		A. K. Antony	Kazhakootam	27 April 1977	29 October 1978	1 year, 185 days	5th (1977 election)	Antony I	Indian National Congress
7		P. K. Vasudevan Nair	Alappuzha	29 October 1978	12 October 1979	348 days	5th (1977 election)	Vasudevan Nair	Communist Party of India
8		C. H. Mohammed Koya	Malappuram	12 October 1979	4 December 1979	53 days	5th (1977 election)	Koya	Indian Union Muslim League
		Vacant (President's rule)	N/A	5 December 1979	25 January 1980	51 days	Dissolved	N/A	
9		E. K. Nayanar	Malampuzha	25 January 1980	20 October 1981	1 year, 268 days	6th (1980 election)	Nayanar I	Communist Party of India (Marxist)
		Vacant (President's rule)	N/A	21 October 1981	28 December 1981	68 days	6th (1980 election)	N/A	
(5)		K. Karunakaran	Mala	28 December 1981	17 March 1982	79 days	6th (1980 election)	Karunakaran II	Indian National Congress
		Vacant (President's rule)	N/A	17 March 1982	23 May 1982	67 days	Dissolved	N/A	
(5)		K. Karunakaran	Mala	24 May 1982	26 March 1987	4 years, 306 days	7th (1982 election)	Karunakaran III	Indian National Congress
(9)		E. K. Nayanar	Thrikaripur	26 March 1987	24 June 1991	4 years, 90 days	8th (1987 election)	Nayanar II	Communist Party of India (Marxist)
(5)		K. Karunakaran	Mala	24 June 1991	22 March 1995	3 years, 271 days	9th (1991 election)	Karunakaran IV	Indian National Congress
(6)		A. K. Antony	Tirurangadi	22 March 1995	20 May 1996	1 year, 59 days	9th (1991 election)	Antony II	Indian National Congress
(9)		E. K. Nayanar	Thalassery	20 May 1996	17 May 2001	4 years, 362 days	10th (1996 election)	Nayanar III	Communist Party of India (Marxist)
(6)		A. K. Antony	Cherthala	17 May 2001	31 August 2004	3 years, 106 days	11th (2001 election)	Antony III	Indian National Congress
10		Oommen Chandy	Puthuppally	31 August 2004	18 May 2006	1 year, 260 days	11th (2001 election)	Oommen I	Indian National Congress
11		V. S. Achuthanandan	Malampuzha	18 May 2006	18 May 2011	5 years, 0 days	12th (2006 election)	Achuthanandan	Communist Party of India (Marxist)
(10)		Oommen Chandy	Puthuppally	18 May 2011	25 May 2016	5 years, 7 days	13th (2011 election)	Oommen II	Indian National Congress
12		Pinarayi Vijayan	Dharmadam	25 May 2016	19 May 2021	9 years, 358 days	14th (2016 election)	Vijayan I	Communist Party of India (Marxist)
12		Pinarayi Vijayan	Dharmadam	20 May 2021	18 May 2026	9 years, 358 days	15th (2021 election)	Vijayan II	Communist Party of India (Marxist)
13		V. D. Satheesan	Paravur	18 May 2026	Incumbent	182 days	16th (2026 election)	Satheesan	Indian National Congress

== Statistics ==
Fraction of time of holding CMO by party in Kerala (as of 11 August 2026)
1. Communist Party of India (Marxist) (43.2%)
2. Indian National Congress (36.8%)
3. Communist Party of India (15.9%)
4. Praja Socialist Party (3.91%)
5. Indian Union Muslim League (0.21%)

List of chief ministers by length of term

No.	Name	Party	Length of term		No: of terms
No.	Name	Party	Longest continuous term	Total years of premiership	No: of terms
1	E. K. Nayanar	CPI(M)	4 years, 361 days	10 years, 353 days	3
2	Pinarayi Vijayan	CPI(M)	9 years, 358 days	9 years, 358 days	2
3	K. Karunakaran	INC	4 years, 305 days	8 years, 315 days	4
4	C. Achutha Menon	CPI	6 years, 172 days	7 years, 80 days	2
5	Oommen Chandy	INC	5 years, 6 days	6 years, 256 days	2
6	A. K. Antony	INC	3 years, 105 days	5 years, 347 days	3
7	V. S. Achuthanandan	CPI(M)	5 years, 0 days	5 years, 0 days	1
8	E. M. S. Namboodiripad	CPI(M)/CPI	2 years 240 days	4 years 357 days	2
9	Pattom A. Thanu Pillai	PSP	2 years 216 days	2 years 216 days	1
10	R. Sankar	INC	1 year 350 days	1 year 350 days	1
11	P. K. Vasudevan Nair	CPI	347 days	347 days	1
12	V. D. Satheesan	INC	182 days	182 days	1
13	C. H. Mohammed Koya	IUML	53 days	53 days	1

List by party

Political parties by total time-span of their member holding CMO (16 November 2026)
No.	Political party	Number of chief ministers	Total days of holding CMO
1	Communist Party of India (Marxist)	4	10436 days
2	Indian National Congress	5	8,995 days
3	Communist Party of India	3	3834 days
4	Praja Socialist Party	1	947 days
5	Indian Union Muslim League	1	53 days

== See also ==
- List of current Indian chief ministers
- Kerala Council of Ministers
- List of deputy chief ministers of Kerala
