= Second Antony ministry =

1995–96 government of Kerala, India

Second A. K. Antony Ministry
- 16th Cabinet of Kerala
- 1995-96
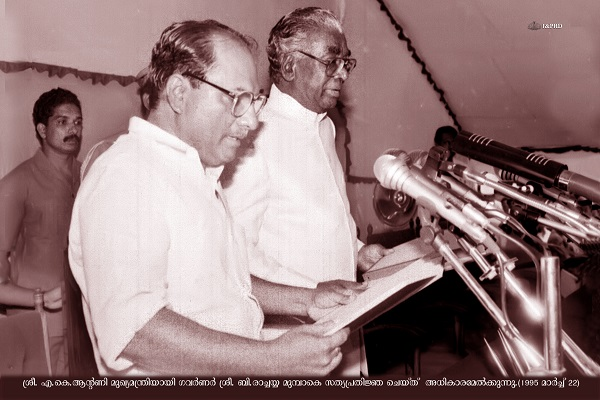
- Date formed: 22 March 1995
- Date dissolved: 9 May 1996

People and organisations
- Head of government: A. K. Antony
- Member parties: UDF
- Status in legislature: Majority
- Opposition party: LDF
- Opposition leader: V. S. Achuthanandan

History
- Election: 1991
- Predecessor: Fourth Karunakaran ministry
- Successor: Third Nayanar ministry

The Ninth Kerala Legislative Assembly Council of Ministers in A. K. Antony's second ministry, was a Kerala Council of Ministers (Kerala Cabinet), the executive wing of Kerala state government, led by Indian National Congress leader A. K. Antony from 22 March 1995 to 9 May 1996 following the resignation of K. Karunakaran. This was the 16th Ministry in Kerala and it comprised 18 ministers.

The Kerala Council of Ministers, during Antony's second term as Chief Minister of Kerala, consisted of:

== Ministers ==
	Minister	Party	Ministry
1	A. K. Antony	Indian National Congress	Chief Minister
2	C.T. Ahammed Ali	Indian Union Muslim League	Minister for Public Works
3	Aryadan Muhammed	Indian National Congress	Minister for Labour and Minister for Tourism
4	R. Balakrishna Pillai	Kerala Congress	Minister for Transport
5	P.K.K. Bava	Indian Union Muslim League	Minister for Panchayat and Social Welfare
6	T.M. Jacob	Kerala Congress	Minister for Irrigation and Culture
7	Kadavoor Sivadasan	Indian National Congress	Minister for Forest and Rural Development
8	G. Karthikeyan	Indian National Congress	Minister for Electricity
9	P.K. Kunhalikutty	Indian Union Muslim League	Minister for Industries and Municipalities
10	K.M. Mani	Kerala Congress	Minister for Revenue and Law
11	E. T. Muhammed Basheer	Indian Union Muslim League	Minister for Education
12	M.T. Padma	Indian National Congress	Minister for Fisheries and Registration
13	C.V. Padmarajan	Indian National Congress	Minister for Finance
14	Pandalam Sudhakaran	Indian National Congress	Minister for Excise and Welfare of Backward and Schedule Communities
15	M.V. Raghavan	Communist Marxist Party	Minister for Co-operation
16	K.K. Ramachandran Master	Indian National Congress	Minister for Food and Civil Supplies
17	V.M. Sudheeran	Indian National Congress	Minister for Health
18	P.P. Thankachan	Indian National Congress	Minister for Agriculture

== See also ==
- A. K. Antony ministry term 1 and A. K. Antony ministry term 3
- Chief Ministers of Kerala
- All Kerala Ministers
