= K. P. Viswanathan =

Indian politician (1940–2023)

Kallayil Pangan Viswanathan (22 April 1940 – 15 December 2023) was an Indian politician.

== Life and career ==
K. P. Viswanathan was born to parents Kallayil Pangan and Parukutty in Kunnamkulam on 22 April 1940, and graduated from Kerala Varma College, Thrissur, and the Government Law College, Ernakulam, then worked as a lawyer.

Viswanathan was affiliated with the Indian Youth Congress, serving as Thrissur District President of the Youth Congress from 1967 to 1970. He won the 1977, and 1980, and 1987 Kerala Legislative Assembly elections to represent Kunnamkulam on behalf of the Indian National Congress. He returned to the Kerala Legislative Assembly in 1987, 1991, 1996, and 2001, as a representative of Kodakara. He also sought the Kodakara seat in 2006 and 2011, losing to C. Raveendranath. Viswanathan served twice as minister of forests and wildlife within the government of Kerala, in the fourth Karunakaran ministry in office between 1991 and 1994, as well as the first Oommen Chandy ministry from 2004 to 2005. Following his 2011 electoral loss, Viswanathan retired from politics.

Viswanathan died in Thrissur on 15 December 2023, at the age of 83. He was married to Lalitha until his death. The couple raised two sons, Sanjith and Ranjith.
