= Koya ministry =

1979 government of Kerala, India

C. H. Mohammed Koya Ministry
- 10th Cabinet of Kerala
- October–December, 1979
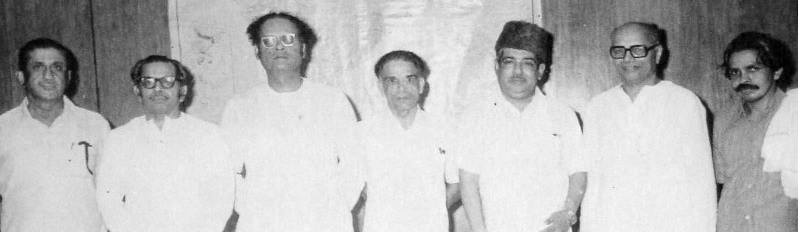
- Date established: 12 October 1979
- Date dissolved: 1 December 1979

Leadership and composition
- Chief Minister: C. H. Mohammed Koya
- Member parties: Indian Union Muslim League Kerala Congress; Praja Socialist Party National Democratic Party
- Opposition party: Communist Party of India
- Opposition leader: P. K. Vasudevan Nair

Formation and history
- Election: 1977
- Predecessor: P. K. Vasudevan Nair ministry
- Successor: First Nayanar ministry

C. H. Mohammed Koya ministry, from 12 October to 1 December 1979, 4th ministry from the 5th Kerala Legislative Assembly, was a coalition government headed Indian Union Muslim League leader C. H. Mohammed Koya and supported by Congress leader K. Karunakaran. Koya was the first Indian Union Muslim League member to lead a state in independent India.

Gift Deeds Bill, an amendment to the Kerala Land Reforms Act, was passed by the Koya ministry. It validated gifts from owners with surplus land to their children or children of deceased children executed between 1 January 1970 and 5 November 1974. The amendment reduced the redistributive potential of the Kerala land ceiling legislations.

The ministry was formed after the resignation of the P. K. Vasudevan Nair ministry in October, 1979. The coalition was supported by Kerala Congress K. M. Mani Group and P. J. Joseph Group. Kerala Congress K. M. Mani Group withdrew its support for the coalition in mid-November, 1979. When the Congress A. K. Antony Group withdrew its support for the coalition, Koya lost his Legislative Assembly majority, and resigned in December, 1979. The Koya ministry lasted 1 month and 20 days.

After a brief President's Rule, it was succeeded by the first E. K. Nayanar ministry (25 January 1980).

Koya ministry
Minister	Portfolio	Party	Term
C. H. Mohammed Koya	Chief Minister (all other unallocated portfolios)	Indian Union Muslim League	12 October–1 December 1979
N. K. Balakrishnan	Minister for Public Works and Agriculture	IND (Praja Socialist Party)	12 October–1 December 1979
N. Bhaskaran Nair	Minister for Labour and Housing	IND (National Democratic Party)	12 October–1 December 1979
K. J. Chacko	Minister for Revenue and Co-operation	Kerala Congress	16 November–1 December 1979
K. A. Mathew	Minister for Industries and Forests	Kerala Congress	16 November–1 December 1979
