= P. K. Vasudevan Nair ministry =

1978–79 government of Kerala, India

P. K. Vasudevan Nair Ministry
- 9th Cabinet of Kerala
- 1978-79
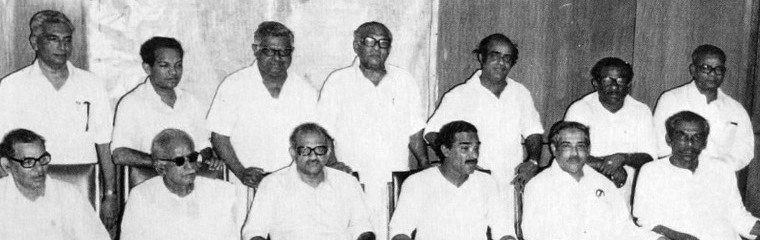
- Date established: 29 October 1978
- Date dissolved: 7 October 1979

Leadership and composition
- Head of government: P. K. Vasudevan Nair
- Member parties: United Front
- Opposition party: Indian National Congress
- Opposition leader: K. Karunakaran

Formation and history
- Election: 1977
- Predecessor: First Antony ministry
- Successor: Koya ministry

The P. K. Vasudevan Nair Ministry (29 October 1978 – 7 October 1979) was a short-lived ministry of the Kerala Legislative Assembly led by Communist Party of India Leader P. K. Vasudevan Nair.

P. K. Vasudevan Nair took charge as the Chief Minister of Kerala 29 October 1978. However, he tendered his resignation on 7 October 1979.

== Ministers ==
	Minister	Ministry	Notes
1	P. K. Vasudevan Nair	Chief Minister	
2a	J. Chitharanjan	Minister for Public Health	Resigned w.e.f. 18 November 1978
2b	K.P. Prabhakaran	Minister for Public Health	Assumed office on 18 November 1978
3a	Kanthalot Kunhambu	Minister for Forests	Resigned w.e.f. 18 November 1978
3b	P. S. Sreenivasan	Minister for Industries and Forests	Assumed office on 18 November 1978
4	Damodaran Kalassery	Minister for Harijan Welfare and Community Development	
5	A.L. Jacob	Minister for Agriculture	
6	M.K. Raghavan	Minister for Labour and Housing	
7	S. Varadarajan Nair	Minister for Finance	
8	K. Avukaderkutty Naha	Minister for Local Administration	Assumed office on 9 December 1978
9	C.H. Mohammed Koya	Minister for Education	
10	T.S. John	Minister for Food and Civil Supplies	
11	K.M. Mani	Minister for Home Affairs	Resigned w.e.f 26 July 1979
12	K. Narayana Kurup	Minister for Transport	
13	Baby John	Minister for Revenue and Co-operation	
14	K. Pankajakshan	Minister for Public Works and Sports	

== See also ==
- P. K. Vasudevan Nair
- Communist Party of India
