= Third Antony ministry =

2001–04 government of Kerala, India

Third A. K. Antony Ministry
- 18th Cabinet of Kerala
- 2001-04
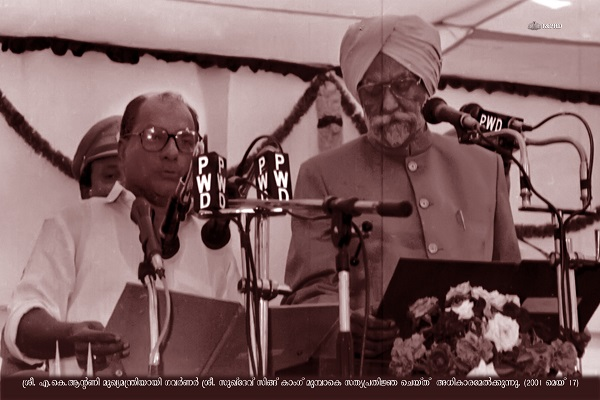
- Date formed: 17 May 2001
- Date dissolved: 29 August 2004

People and organisations
- Head of government: A. K. Antony
- Member parties: UDF
- Status in legislature: Majority
- Opposition party: LDF
- Opposition leader: V. S. Achuthanandan

History
- Election: 2001
- Predecessor: Third Nayanar ministry
- Successor: First Oommen ministry

The Eleventh Kerala Legislative Assembly Council of Ministers in A. K. Antony's third ministry, was a Kerala Council of Ministers (Kerala Cabinet), the executive wing of Kerala state government, led by Indian National Congress leader A. K. Antony from 17 May 2001 to 29 August 2004. This was the 18th Ministry in Kerala and it comprised 21 ministers.

== Ministers ==
	Minister	Party	Ministry/Portfolio
1	A. K. Antony	Indian National Congress	Chief Minister (Also in charge of Home Department)
2	K. Sankaranarayanan	Indian National Congress	Minister for Finance
3	K. M. Mani	Kerala Congress	Minister for Revenue
4	M. K. Muneer	Indian Union Muslim League	Minister for Public Works
5	P. K. Kunhalikutty	Indian Union Muslim League	Minister for Industries
6	K. R. Gouri Amma	Janathipathiya Samrakshana Samithy	Minister of Agriculture, Animal Husbandry, Coir
7	M. V. Raghavan	Communist Marxist Party	Minister for Co-operation
8	Kadavoor Sivadasan	Indian National Congress	Minister for Electricity
9	Babu Divakaran	Revolutionary Socialist Party (India)	Minister for Labour and Minister for Employment
10	T. M. Jacob	Kerala Congress	Minister for Water Resources
11	K. B. Ganesh Kumar	Kerala Congress	Minister for Transport
12	C. F. Thomas	Kerala Congress	Minister for Culture
13	P Sankaran	Indian National Congress	Minister for Health
14	M. A. Kuttappan	Indian National Congress	Minister for Forestry
15	Nalakath Soopy	Indian Union Muslim League	Minister for Education
16	G. Karthikeyan	Indian National Congress	Minister for Devaswom
17	K. V. Thomas	Indian National Congress	Minister for Tourism
18	M M Hassan	Indian National Congress	Minister for External Affairs
19	K. Sudhakaran	Indian National Congress	Minister for Forests and Sports
20	Chekkalam Abdulla	Indian Union Muslim League	Minister for Local Self Government

== Achievements ==
- The Akshaya project was implemented in 2002 by providing E-literacy to the people those who haven't it and opening Akshaya centres in the remote rural areas of the state, thus ensuring Internet availability all over the state, aiming to make Kerala the first complete E-literate state of India.
