= Left Democratic Front =

Political alliance in India

- Abbreviation: LDF
- Leader: Pinarayi Vijayan (Leader of the Opposition); T. P. Ramakrishnan (convenor)
- Lok Sabha Leader: K. Radhakrishnan
- Rajya Sabha Leader: John Brittas
- Founders: P. K. Vasudevan Nair; E. M. S. Namboodiripad
- Founded: 1979; 47 years ago
- Ideology: Socialism; Marxism; Secularism
- Colours: Red
- Rajya Sabha: 6 / 9
- Lok Sabha: 1 / 20
- Kerala Legislative Assembly: 35 / 140
- Gram Panchayats: 338 / 941
- Block Panchayat: 64 / 152
- District Panchayat: 7 / 14
- Municipalities: 28 / 86
- Municipal Corporation: 1 / 6

The Left Democratic Front (LDF) is an alliance of left-wing political parties in the Indian state of Kerala. It is led by the Communist Party of India (Marxist) (CPI(M)), and also includes the Communist Party of India (CPI) and various smaller parties. It is one of the two major political alliances in Kerala, the other being Indian National Congress–led United Democratic Front. The two alliances have been in power alternately for the last four decades. The LDF has been the official opposition in the Kerala Legislative Assembly since 2026.

The LDF has won 6 out of 10 elections to the State Legislature of Kerala since it formed in 1980. It won in 1980, 1987, 1996, 2006, 2016 and 2021. It was in power under E. K. Nayanar (1980–81, 1987–91, 1996–2001), V. S. Achuthanandan (2006–11) and Pinarayi Vijayan (2016–2026). Nayanar served as the Chief Minister of Kerala for 11 years and later became the longest serving Chief Minister of Kerala.

After the alliance was elected with 91 out of 140 seats in 2016, it increased its tally to 99 seats in the 2021 election, the first time in 40 years that an incumbent government in Kerala was re-elected, with Vijayan becoming the first chief minister of Kerala to be re-elected after completing a full term (five years) in office.

== History ==
=== Early years (1957–1979) ===
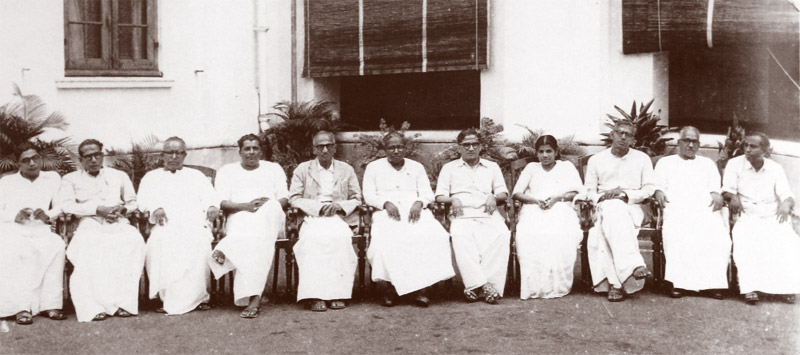
1st cabinet ministry of Kerala led by E. M. S. Namboodiripad (1957)

The political scenario in Kerala (1957–1980) was characterized by continually shifting alliances, party mergers and splits, factionalism within the coalitions and within political parties, and the formation of a numerous splinter groups. 1957 Kerala Legislative Assembly election was the first assembly election in the Indian state of Kerala. The Communist Party of India won the election with 60 seats. The election led to the formation of first democratically elected communist government in India. A Communist-led government under E. M. S. Namboodiripad resulted from the first elections for the new Kerala Legislative Assembly in 1957, making him the first communist leader in India to head a popularly elected government. It was one of the first Communist governments to be democratically elected, after Communist successes in the 1945 elections in the Republic of San Marino, a microstate in Europe, and the 1946 Czechoslovak elections. The coalition politics of Kerala began with second election held to the state legislative assembly in 1960. The Communist Party of India (Marxist) first came into power in Kerala in 1967, under Seven party front, which was an alliance of CPI(M), CPI, IUML, and four other parties. In 1970's, the major political parties in the state were unified under two major coalitions, one of them led by Indian National Congress and Communist Party of India and the other by CPI(M).

=== Formation of LDF (1979) ===
In the late 1970s and early 1980s, two main pre-poll political alliances were formed: the Left Democratic Front (LDF), led by the Communist Party of India (Marxist) and Communist Party of India and the United Democratic Front (UDF), led by the Indian National Congress. These pre-poll political alliances of Kerala have stabilized strongly in such a manner that, with rare exceptions, most of the coalition partners stick their loyalty to the respective alliances (Left Democratic Front or United Democratic Front).

=== Left Democratic Front (1980–present) ===
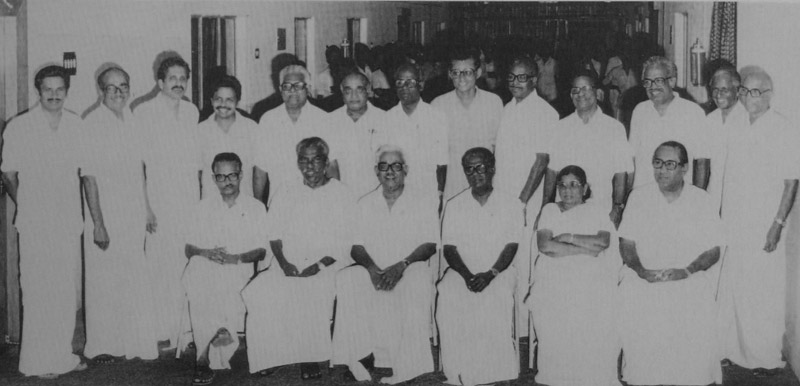
2nd Nayanar Ministry (1987)

LDF first came into power in 1980 election under the leadership of E. K. Nayanar sworn in as the Chief Minister of Kerala on 26 March 1980 for the first time in 1980. He formed government with the support of Congress (A) under A. K. Antony and Kerala Congress under K. M. Mani, Nayanar later became the longest serving Chief Minister of Kerala, ever since 1980 election, the power has been clearly alternating between the two alliances till the 2016. LDF has won 6 out of 10 elections since the formation of the alliance in 1980. Since 1980, none of alliances in Kerala has been re-elected till the 2016. The 1987, 1996 elections led E. K. Nayanar, and the 2006 elections led by V. S. Achuthanandan formed governments and completed their full terms but were not re-elected. In 2016, LDF won the 2016 election led by Pinarayi Vijayan and had a historic re-election in 2021 election where an incumbent government was re-elected for first time in 40 years. Pinarayi Vijayan was the first Chief minister of Kerala to be re-elected after completing a full term (five years) in office.

=== List of LDF Conveners ===
Founders of the LDF

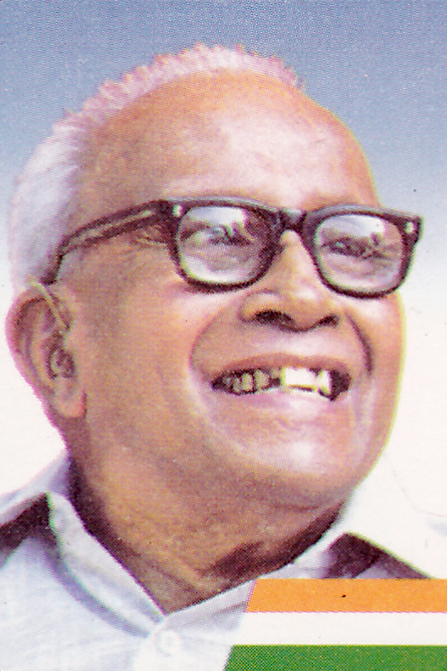
E. M. S. Namboodiripad

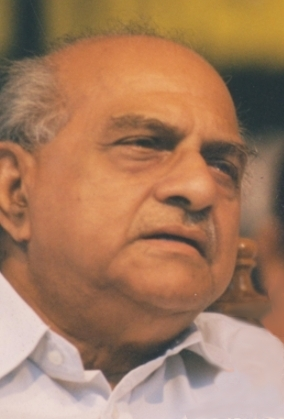
P. K. Vasudevan Nair

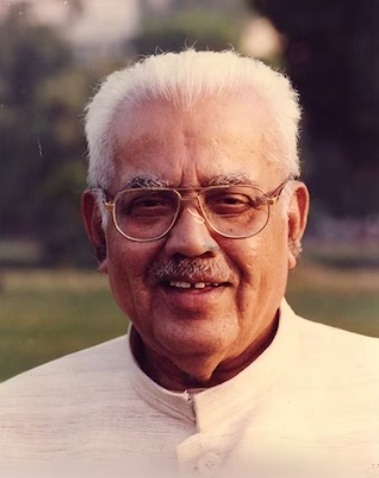
E. K. Nayanar
Longest serving Chief minister of Kerala

No	Portrait	Name	Year
1		P. V. Kunjikannan	1980–1986
2		T. K. Ramakrishnan	1986–1987
3		M. M. Lawrence	1987–1998
4		V. S. Achuthanandan	1998–2001
5		Paloli Mohammed Kutty	2001–2006
6		Vaikom Viswan	2006–2018
7		A. Vijayaraghavan	2018–2022
8		E. P. Jayarajan	2022–2024
9		T. P. Ramakrishnan	2024–present

== Members ==
=== Current members ===
Left Democratic Front
Party	Flag	Ideology	Kerala Unit Leader
Communist Party of India (Marxist)		Marxism-Leninism; Socialism; Secularism; Anti-imperialism	M. V. Govindan
Communist Party of India		Marxism-Leninism; Socialism; Secularism; Anti-imperialism	Binoy Viswam
Kerala Congress (M)		Democratic socialism	Jose K. Mani
Rashtriya Janata Dal		Socialism; Left-wing populism	M. V. Shreyams Kumar
Congress Socialist Party		Democratic socialism Left-wing nationalism	Kadannappalli Ramachandran
Nationalist Congress Party (Sharadchandra Pawar)		Secularism	P. C. Chacko
Indian Socialist Janata Dal		Democratic socialism	Mathew T. Thomas
Kerala Congress (B)		Democratic socialism	K. B. Ganesh Kumar
Indian National League		Secularism; Social justice	Ahamed Devarkovil
Janadhipathya Kerala Congress		Socialism	Antony Raju
Revolutionary Socialist Party (Leninist)		Revolutionary socialism	Kovoor Kunjumon

=== Associate Members ===
The following are the associate member parties in LDF:

- Kerala Congress (Skaria Thomas)
- National Secular Conference
- Marxist-Leninist Party of India (Red Flag)
- National League led by Abdul Wahab

== Chief ministers ==
=== List of chief ministers from Left Democratic Front in Kerala (1980–present) ===
No (Note: A number in parentheses indicates that the incumbent has previously held office)	Portrait	Name (Note: Year in parentheses indicates life span)	Tenure			Total	Party (Note: This column only names the chief minister's party. The state government he heads may be a complex coalition of several parties and independents; these are not listed here.)	Ministry
1		E. K. Nayanar (1919–2004)	25 January 1980	20 October 1981	1 year, 268 days	10 years, 353 days	Communist Party of India (Marxist)	Nayanar I
1		E. K. Nayanar (1919–2004)	26 March 1987	24 June 1991	4 years, 90 days	10 years, 353 days	Communist Party of India (Marxist)	Nayanar II
1		E. K. Nayanar (1919–2004)	20 May 1996	17 May 2001	4 years, 362 days	10 years, 353 days	Communist Party of India (Marxist)	Nayanar III
2		V. S. Achuthanandan (1923–2025)	18 May 2006	18 May 2011	5 years, 0 days	5 years 0 days	Communist Party of India (Marxist)	Achuthanandan
3		Pinarayi Vijayan (b. 1945)	25 May 2016	19 May 2021	9 years, 358 days	9 years, 358 days	Communist Party of India (Marxist)	Pinarayi I
3		Pinarayi Vijayan (b. 1945)	20 May 2021	18 May 2026	9 years, 358 days	9 years, 358 days	Communist Party of India (Marxist)	Pinarayi II

=== List of chief ministers from parties of Left Democratic Front (1957–1980) ===
No (Note: A number in parentheses indicates that the incumbent has previously held office)	Portrait	Name (Note: Year in parentheses indicates life span)	Tenure			Total	Party (Note: This column only names the chief minister's party. The state government he heads may be a complex coalition of several parties and independents; these are not listed here.)	Ministry
1		E. M. S. Namboodiripad (1909–1998)	5 April 1957	31 July 1959	2 years, 117 days	4 years 357 days	Communist Party of India	Namboodiripad I
1		E. M. S. Namboodiripad (1909–1998)	6 March 1967	1 November 1969	2 years, 240 days	4 years 357 days	Communist Party of India (Marxist)	Namboodiripad II
2		C. Achutha Menon (1913–1991)	1 November 1969	3 August 1970	275 days	7 years, 80 days	Communist Party of India	Achutha Menon I
2		C. Achutha Menon (1913–1991)	4 October 1970	25 March 1977	6 years, 172 days	7 years, 80 days	Communist Party of India	Achutha Menon II
3		P. K. Vasudevan Nair (1926–2005)	29 October 1978	12 October 1979	348 days	348 days	Communist Party of India	Vasudevan Nair

=== List of political alliances of Kerala in power (1980–present) ===
No.	Political alliance	Total days in governance	Number of Chief ministers
1	LDF	9476 days	3
2	UDF	7481 days	3

== Electoral history ==
=== Kerala Legislative Assembly elections ===
Vote share in consecutive Kerala Assembly elections
1982	47.25%
1987	44.97%
1991	45.88%
1996	45.88%
2001	43.70%
2006	48.63%
2011	44.94%
2016	43.48%
2021	45.43%
2026	37.64%

Performance of Left Democratic Front, Kerala in Kerala Assembly elections
Election Year	Leader	Seats won	Change	Outcome
1980	E. K. Nayanar	93 / 140	New	Government, later Opposition
1982	E. K. Nayanar	63 / 140	▼30	Opposition
1987	E. K. Nayanar	78 / 140	▲15	Government
1991	E. K. Nayanar	48 / 140	▼42	Opposition
1996	E. K. Nayanar	80 / 140	▲32	Government
2001	V. S. Achuthanandan	40 / 140	▼40	Opposition
2006	V. S. Achuthanandan	98 / 140	▲58	Government
2011	V. S. Achuthanandan	68 / 140	▼30	Opposition
2016	Pinarayi Vijayan	91 / 140	▲23	Government
2021	Pinarayi Vijayan	99 / 140	▲8	Government
2026	Pinarayi Vijayan	35 / 140	▼64	Opposition

All time-LDF Kerala assembly seat count (For majority=70 seats)

==== Assembly election result by alliance ====
Mandate	Seats secured				Ruling coalition	Majority
Mandate	LDF	UDF	NDA	Others	Ruling coalition	Majority
1980	93	46	0	1	LDF	47
1982	63	77	0	0	UDF	14
1987	78	61	0	1	LDF	17
1991	48	90	0	2	UDF	40
1996	80	59	0	1	LDF	21
2001	40	99	0	1	UDF	59
2006	98	42	0	0	LDF	56
2011	68	72	0	0	UDF	04
2016	91	47	1	1	LDF	44
2021	99	41	0	0	LDF	59
2026	35	102	3	0	UDF	67

=== Indian General Elections (Lok Sabha) ===
Performance of Left Democratic Front, Kerala in Lok Sabha elections
Election Year	Legislature	Seats won / contested	Change in seats	Total votes	Per. of votes	Change in vote %	Ref.
1980	7th Lok Sabha	12 / 20	▲12	N/A	N/A	N/A	
1984	8th Lok Sabha	2 / 20	▼10	4,607,568	42.24%	N/A	
1989	9th Lok Sabha	3 / 20	▲1	6,370,627	42.93%	▲0.70%	
1991	10th Lok Sabha	4 / 20	▲1	6,446,253	44.28%	▲1.35%	
1996	11th Lok Sabha	10 / 20	▲6	6,469,266	44.87%	▲0.59%	
1998	12th Lok Sabha	9 / 20	▼1	6,628,189	44.55%	▼0.32%	
1999	13th Lok Sabha	9 / 20	Steady	6,713,244	43.70%	▼0.85%	
2004	14th Lok Sabha	18 / 20	▲9	6,962,151	46.15%	▲2.45%	
2009	15th Lok Sabha	4 / 20	▼14	6,717,418	41.89%	▼4.26%	
2014	16th Lok Sabha	8 / 20	▲4	7,211,257	40.12%	▼1.77%	
2019	17th Lok Sabha	1 / 20	▼7	7,156,387	36.29%	▼3.83%	
2024	18th Lok Sabha	1 / 20	Steady	6,590,526	33.34%	▼2.95%	

=== In Kerala Municipal Corporations ===
Corporation	Election Year	Seats won/ Total seats	Sitting side
Thiruvananthapuram Corporation	2025	29 / 101	Opposition
Kozhikode Municipal Corporation	2025	35 / 76	Government
Kochi Municipal Corporation	2025	20 / 76	Opposition
Kollam Municipal Corporation	2025	16 / 56	Opposition
Thrissur Municipal Corporation	2025	11 / 56	Opposition
Kannur Municipal Corporation	2025	15 / 56	Opposition

== List of elected members ==
=== Kerala Legislative Assembly ===
The LDF is the official opposition alliance in the Kerala Niyamasabha which has 35 seats out of the 140.

Map of Kerala showing 2026 State Legislative Assembly Election Results

No.	District	Constituency	Name	Party
1	Kasaragod	Kanhangad	Govindan Pallikappil	CPI
2	Kannur	Kalliasseri	M. Vijin	CPI(M)
3	Kannur	Azhikode	K. V. Sumesh	CPI(M)
4	Kannur	Dharmadom	Pinarayi Vijayan	CPI(M)
5	Kannur	Thalassery	Karayi Rajan	CPI(M)
6	Kannur	Kuthuparamba	P. K. Praveen	RJD
7	Kannur	Mattanur	V. K. Sanoj	CPI(M)
8	Kozhikode	Beypore	P. A. Mohammed Riyas	CPI(M)
9	Palakkad	Pattambi	Muhammed Muhsin	CPI
10	Palakkad	Shornur	P. Mammikutty	CPI(M)
11	Palakkad	Ottapalam	K. Premkumar	CPI(M)
12	Palakkad	Malampuzha	A. Prabhakaran	CPI(M)
13	Palakkad	Tarur	P. P. Sumod	CPI(M)
14	Palakkad	Nenmara	K. Preman	CPI(M)
15	Palakkad	Alathur	T. M. Sasi	CPI(M)
16	Thrissur	Chelakkara	U. R. Pradeep	CPI(M)
17	Thrissur	Kunnamkulam	A. C. Moideen	CPI(M)
18	Thrissur	Guruvayur	N. K. Akbar	CPI(M)
19	Thrissur	Manalur	C. Raveendranath	CPI(M)
20	Thrissur	Wadakkanchery	Xavier Chittilappilly	CPI(M)
21	Thrissur	Ollur	K. Rajan	CPI
22	Thrissur	Nattika	Geetha Gopi	CPI
23	Thrissur	Kaipamangalam	K. K. Valsaraj	CPI
24	Thrissur	Puthukkad	K. K. Ramachandran	CPI(M)
25	Alappuzha	Cherthala	P. Prasad	CPI
26	Alappuzha	Mavelikara	M. S. Arun Kumar	CPI(M)
27	Alappuzha	Chengannur	Saji Cherian	CPI(M)
28	Pathanamthitta	Konni	K. U. Jenish Kumar	CPI(M)
29	Kollam	Kottarakkara	K. N. Balagopal	CPI(M)
30	Kollam	Punalur	C. Ajayaprasad	CPI
31	Thiruvananthapuram	Varkala	V. Joy	CPI(M)
32	Thiruvananthapuram	Attingal	O. S. Ambika	CPI(M)
33	Thiruvananthapuram	Nedumangad	G. R. Anil	CPI
34	Thiruvananthapuram	Aruvikkara	G. Steephen	CPI(M)
35	Thiruvananthapuram	Parassala	C. K. Hareendran	CPI(M)

=== Rajya Sabha ===
Keys:

CPI(M) (3) CPI (2) KC(M) (1)

#	Name	Party	Term start	Term end
1	A. A. Rahim	CPI(M)	03-Apr-2022	03-Apr-2028
2	V. Sivadasan	CPI(M)	24-Apr-2021	23-Apr-2027
3	John Brittas	CPI(M)	24-Apr-2021	23-Apr-2027
4	P. Santhosh Kumar	CPI	03-Apr-2022	03-Apr-2028
5	P. P. Suneer	CPI	02-Jul-2024	01-Jul-2030
6	Jose K Mani	KC(M)	02-Jul-2024	01-Jul-2030

=== Lok Sabha ===
CPI(M) (1)

#	Constituency	Name	Party
1	Alathur (SC)	K. Radhakrishnan	Communist Party of India (Marxist)

== Kerala local body elections ==
The Left Democratic Front (LDF), who is state opposition, won in nearly one-third of all gram panchayats and block panchayats, half of district panchayats and in one out of six municipal corporations.

2015 Kerala local elections
Local self-government body	Local Bodies won				Total
Local self-government body	LDF	UDF	NDA	Others	Total
Gram Panchayats	549	365	14	13	941
Block Panchayats	90	61	0	1	152
District Panchayats	7	7	0	0	14
Municipalities	44	41	1	0	87
Corporations	4	2	0	0	6

2020 Kerala local elections
Local self-government body	Local Bodies in lead					Total
Local self-government body	LDF	UDF	NDA	Others	Tie	Total
Grama Panchayats	514	321	19	23	64	941
Block Panchayats	108	38	0	0	6	152
District Panchayats	11	3	0	0	0 (Note: The ties were later resolved, LDF now control 11 and UDF controls 3 district panchayats. Refer Aftermath section)	14
Municipalities	43	41	2	0	0 (Note: The ties were later resolved and LDF now control 43 municipalities and UDF controls 41. Refer Aftermath section)	86
Corporations	5	1	0	0	0	6

2025 Kerala local elections
Local self-government body	Local Bodies in lead					Total
Local self-government body	LDF	UDF	NDA	Others	Tie	Total
Grama Panchayats	340	505	26	6	64	941
Block Panchayats	63	79	0	0	10	152
District Panchayats	7	7	0	0	0	14
Municipalities	28	54	2	1	1	86
Corporations	1	4	1	0	0	6

== Political activism ==
On 7 December 2011, the LDF organized a 208 km human wall demanding the construction of a new dam in place of the present 115-year leaky dam at Mullapperiyar. The human wall was the second-longest of the kind in Kerala which stretched across two districts.

LDF launched its website ahead of 2011 Kerala Assembly Election.

== See also ==
- Communist Party of India (Marxist), Kerala
- Communism in Kerala
- United Front (1967–1969, Kerala)
- Left Front (West Bengal)
- Politics of Kerala
- United Democratic Front (Kerala)
- Political parties in Kerala
- List of communist parties in India
