= First Achutha Menon ministry =

1969–1970 government of Kerala, India

First Achutha Menon Ministry
- 5th Cabinet of Kerala
- 1969–1970
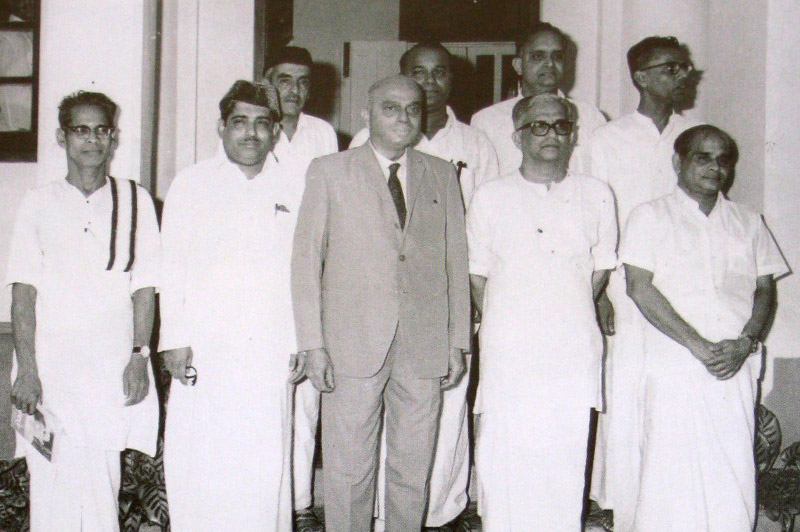
- Achutha Menon and his colleagues with Governor V. Viswanathan
- Date formed: 1 November 1969
- Date dissolved: 3 August 1970

People and organisations
- Head of government: C. Achutha Menon
- Member party: Communist Party of India; Indian National Congress; Indian Union Muslim League; Revolutionary Socialist Party
- Status in legislature: Coalition Minority
- Opposition party: Communist Party of India (Marxist)

History
- Election: 1967 Kerala Legislative Assembly election
- Predecessor: Second Namboodiripad ministry
- Successor: Second Achutha Menon Ministry

The Council of Ministers (1969–70) of Legislative Assembly, Kerala state (better known as C. Achutha Menon ministry - first term) was the Council of Ministers, the executive wing of state government, in the Indian state of Kerala. The ministry was led (Chief Minister) by Communist Party of India leader C. Achutha Menon from 1 November 1969 to 3 August 1970 and had eight ministries.

== Ministers ==
| | Minister | Ministry/Portfolio |
|---|---|---|
| 1 | C. Achutha Menon | Chief Minister |
| 2 | P. Ravindran | Minister for Industries and Labour |
| 3 | K. T. Jacob | Minister for Revenue |
| 4 | C. H. Muhammad Koya | Minister for Education and Home |
| 5 | K. Avukadarkutty Naha | Minister for Local Administration |
| 6 | N. K. Seshan* | Minister for Finance |
| 7 | O. Koran ** | Minister for Irrigation & Agriculture |
| 8 | K. M. George | Minister for Transport & Health |

== Resignations ==
N K Seshan resigned w.e.f. 2 April 1970 and O. Koran resigned w.e.f. 1 August 1970
