= Congress (A) =

Indian National Congress (A)
- Abbreviation: INC (A)
- Founder: A. K. Antony
- Split from: Indian National Congress (Urs)
- Merged into: Indian National Congress
- Colours: Turquoise
- ECI Status: Dissolved Party

Congress (A) was a political party in India founded by A. K. Antony when he split from the Indian National Congress (U), itself a splinter group of the Indian National Congress. The party was primarily active in Kerala. The party merged with the Congress (I) in 1982.

== See also ==
- List of Indian National Congress breakaway parties
