= E. K. Nayanar =

Former Chief minister of Kerala

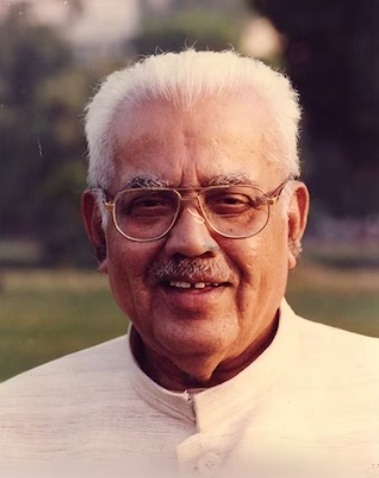

9th Chief Minister of Kerala
- In office 20 May 1996 – 13 May 2001
- Preceded by: A. K. Antony
- Succeeded by: A. K. Antony
- In office 26 March 1987 – 17 June 1991
- Preceded by: K. Karunakaran
- Succeeded by: K. Karunakaran
- In office 25 January 1980 – 20 October 1981
- Preceded by: C. H. Mohammed Koya
- Succeeded by: K. Karunakaran

Member of Parliament, Lok Sabha
- In office 1967–1971
- Preceded by: P. Kunhan
- Succeeded by: A. K. Gopalan
- Constituency: Palakkad

Leader of the Opposition, Kerala Legislative Assembly
- In office 1981–1987
- Preceded by: K. Karunakaran
- Succeeded by: K. Karunakaran
- Constituency: Malampuzha
- In office 1991–1992
- Preceded by: K. Karunakaran
- Succeeded by: V. S. Achuthanandan
- Constituency: Thrikkarippur

Secretary of the Communist Party of India (Marxist) Kerala State Committee
- In office 1972–1980
- Preceded by: C. H. Kanaran
- Succeeded by: V. S. Achuthanandan
- In office 1992–1996
- Preceded by: V. S. Achuthanandan
- Succeeded by: Chadayan Govindan

Member of the Politburo of the Communist Party of India (Marxist)
- In office 9 January 1992 – 19 May 2004

Personal details
- Born: 9 December 1919 Kalliasseri, Madras Presidency, British India (present day Kannur, Kerala, India)
- Died: 19 May 2004 (aged 84) Delhi, India
- Cause of death: Heart and Kidney failure
- Resting place: Payyambalam Beach, Kannur, Kerala
- Party: Communist Party of India (Marxist)
- Children: 4
- As of 2 November, 2007 Source: Government of Kerala

Erambala Krishnan Nayanar (9 December 1919 – 19 May 2004) was an Indian writer, independence activist, communist politician and statesman who served as the 9th chief minister of Kerala from 1980 to 1981, 1987 to 1991 and again from 1996 to 2001. He served in that position for a total of 10 years, 11 months and 22 days, thus making him the longest-served Chief Minister of Kerala. He was a senior leader of the Communist Party of India (Marxist).

== Early life ==
Nayanar was born in an aristocratic Nair family of North Malabar (present-day Kalliasseri, Kannur district, Kerala) on 9 December 1919, as the second son of Govindan Nambiar and Narayani Amma. Despite his father, Govindan Nambiar, being a believer in the feudalism, Nayanar took to the national movement of the time at a very young age under the influence of his cousin, K.P.R. Gopalan. Nayanar was influenced by the events following the admission of a Dalit girl to local school under the leadership of K.P.R. Gopalan. Nayanar was a participant in student movements in the Malabar region as a part of Balasangham and consequently dropped out of school. He also faced severe opposition from his father. He was drawn towards the socialist ideology guided by leaders like P. Krishna Pillai. Nayanar famously helped in the establishment of a library and named it Shri Harshan Library, after Harshan, a member of the oppressed caste who was tortured to death at the Kannur Central Jail for his participation in the national movement.

== Political life ==
=== Pre-Independence ===
Nayanar was an Indian National Congress member then he joined the Communist Party of India in 1939 at the age of 20. As a youth leader, Nayanar organized several movements. He led the forty-six-day-long Aaron Mill workers' protest against the dismissal of thirty workers by the mill management in 1940. He was jailed for six months as a consequence. Nayanar was one of the organizers of Morazha rally on 15 September 1940 in protest of rising prices. Two policemen were killed in the rally and Nayanar went into hiding for six years without knowing that he was not one of the accused. He also organized peasant uprisings in Kayyur. A policeman was stoned by protesters and subsequently died in Kayyur. Communist leaders were actively pursued by police following the incident, forcing Nayanar to go into hiding in forest areas in Eleri. Later on, as Chief Minister, he set up a Government College in the area in 1981. The college was renamed to E.K. Nayanar Memorial Government college. While in hiding in Travancore, he worked as a journalist for Kerala Kaumudi.

=== Post-Independence ===
After Independence, cases against Nayanar were dropped. He continued working actively for Communist Party of India. He was elected Kannur taluk secretary in 1948. He again was forced to go into hiding following 'Calcutta Thesis' proclamation that lead to banning Communist Party in India. During the Sino-Indian War, Nayanar was accused of being pro-China and was imprisoned in 1964 under the Preventive Detention Act. He was the secretary of Kozhikode district committee of the united CPI from 1956 to 1964.

Nayanar was also one of the 32 CPI national council members who walked out and formed CPI(M) in 1964. He was a central committee member of the CPI(M) from the 7th Congress in 1964. He served as the Secretary of the Kerala State Committee of the CPI(M) from 1972 to 1980 and again from 1992 to 1996. He was elected to the Polit Bureau at the 14th Congress in 1992.

=== Legislative career ===
In 1967, he was elected to the Lok Sabha from Palakkad. He became an MLA for the first time from Irikkur legislative assembly in 1974. Since then, he has been elected as an MLA five more times (twice each from Malampuzha (1980 and 1982) and Thrikkarippur (1987 and 1991) and once from Thalassery (1996)), losing only once.

Election	Year	Party	Constituency	Result
Loksabha	1967	CPI(M)	Palakkad	Won
Loksabha	1971	CPI(M)	Kasaragod	Lost
Kerala Legislative Assembly	1974	CPI(M)	Irikkur	Won
Kerala Legislative Assembly	1980	CPI(M)	Malampuzha	Won
Kerala Legislative Assembly	1982	CPI(M)	Malampuzha	Won
Kerala Legislative Assembly	1987	CPI(M)	Thrikkarippur	Won
Kerala Legislative Assembly	1991	CPI(M)	Thrikkarippur	Won
Kerala Legislative Assembly	1996	CPI(M)	Thalasseri	Won

== Chief Minister of Kerala ==
=== Electoral History as the leader of LDF ===
Kerala Assembly election results
Election	Seats won	Change	Outcome
1980	93 / 140	New	Chief minister
1982	63 / 140	▼30	Leader of Opposition
1987	78 / 140	▲15	Chief Minister
1991	48 / 140	▼42	Opposition
1996	80 / 140	▲32	Chief Minister

=== First term (1980 - 1982) ===
The 1980 election saw the formation of two pre-poll alliances, viz. LDF and UDF, most of whose constituent parties were part of the erstwhile United Front. CPI(M)-led LDF to win the election, after winning 93 seats altogether. E. K. Nayanar was sworn in as the Chief Minister on 26 March 1980 Nayanar was sworn in as the Chief Minister of Kerala on 26 March 1980 for the first time in 1980. He formed government with the support of Congress (A) under A. K. Antony and Kerala Congress under K. M. Mani. But both the parties left for United Democratic Front (UDF) coalition and the Government was dissolved on 20 October 1981. He served as the leader of the opposition from 1981 to 1987.

=== Second term (1987 - 1991) ===
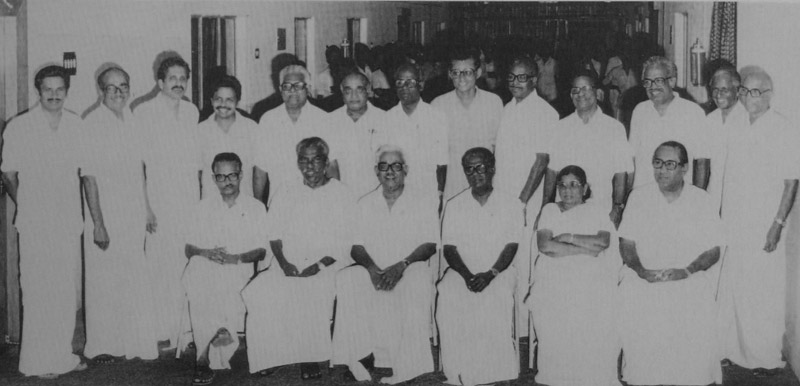
2nd Nayanar Ministry (1987)

In the 1987 election under the leadership of Nayanar LDF secured a decisive majority in the assembly securing 78 seats. The UDF won 61 seats. Nayanar became the chief Minister for a second time in 1987. But he did not complete his term of five years as CPI(M) decided to contest elections early in 1991 assuming political climate to be favourable. But the left lost the elections and Nayanar became the leader of the opposition yet again. He resigned from that post the very next year when he was chosen as the Kerala state secretary of the CPI(M) and was succeeded by V. S. Achuthanandan as the opposition leader.

=== Third term (1996 - 2001) ===
In the 1996 election, LDF secured a decisive majority in the assembly securing 80 seats. Nayanar initially had not contested the 1996 assembly elections but as V. S. Achuthanandan who was projected as the Chief Ministerial candidate lost in Mararikkulam. A faction in the party wanted Susheela Gopalan to be the Chief Minister, but when the matter was put to vote in the state secretariat, Nayanar was selected to be the CM. He contested and won by-elections in Thalasseri. He is revered and respected by both the LDF and UDF for his contributions for the development of the state.

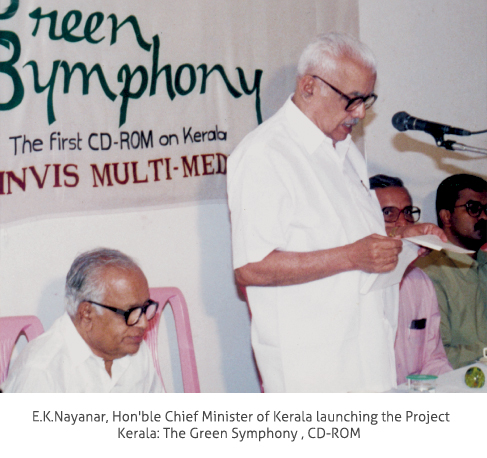
Nayanar launching Project Kerala: The Green Symphony (1998)

=== Achievements ===
Nayanar introduced several reforms during his tenures as Chief Minister like The Kerala Coir workers Welfare Fund Act, 1987, The Kerala Khadi Workers Welfare Fund Act, 1989, The Kerala Abkari Workers Welfare Fund Act, 1989, The Kerala Construction Workers Welfare Fund Act, 1989 and the Kerala Ration Dealer's Welfare Fund Act, 1998. In 1996, the new LDF government led by EK Nayanar made People's Planning Campaign. The government commissioned a staggering 33% of its money to local governments like the panchayats, municipalities and corporations. The campaign thus allowed for the provision of a three-tier system of power in panchayats and a one tier system in urban areas, and also helped local people to determine and implement their own development priorities. This helped make the government more effective, more inclusive and moreover people-centric. Decentralisation was implemented.

The Total Literacy Campaign (TLC) in Kerala was a landmark initiative that aimed to eradicate illiteracy and promote universal literacy. The campaign was launched on January 26, 1989 by Nayanar in Ernakulam district and later expanded statewide. The campaign, supported by the government and civil society, played a pivotal role in Kerala becoming India's first fully literate state on April 18, 1991 within 2 years.

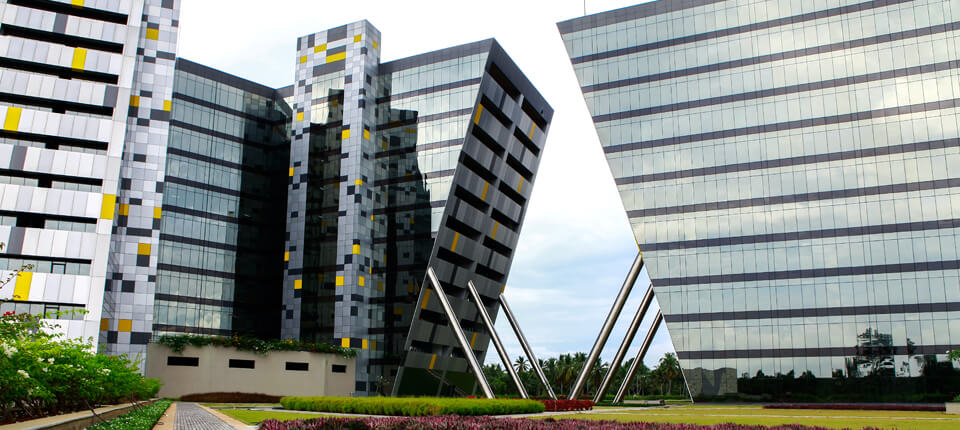
Technopark, Trivandrum

Nayanar visited the Apple facility in the Silicon Valley, United States in 1989. This led to form Technopark, India's first IT park and still remains the largest in India. Nayanar laid the foundation stone on 1990. Technopark came into being on 28 July 1990, after it was registered under the Travancore Cochin Scientific and Charitable Societies Act. As of 2020, the IT park employs 70,000 people and provide indirect employment to lakhs.

In 1998, Kutumbashree, a movement for the empowerment of women, was launched by the Nayanar Government. Today, Kudumbashree is Kerala's 43 lakh women community network, which is spread across 941 Panchayats. Kudumbashree is always the most ignored pillar of the Kerala Model. In 1989, EK Nayanar started the total literacy campaign, leading to a declaration in April 1991 that Kerala was the first totally literate state in the country.

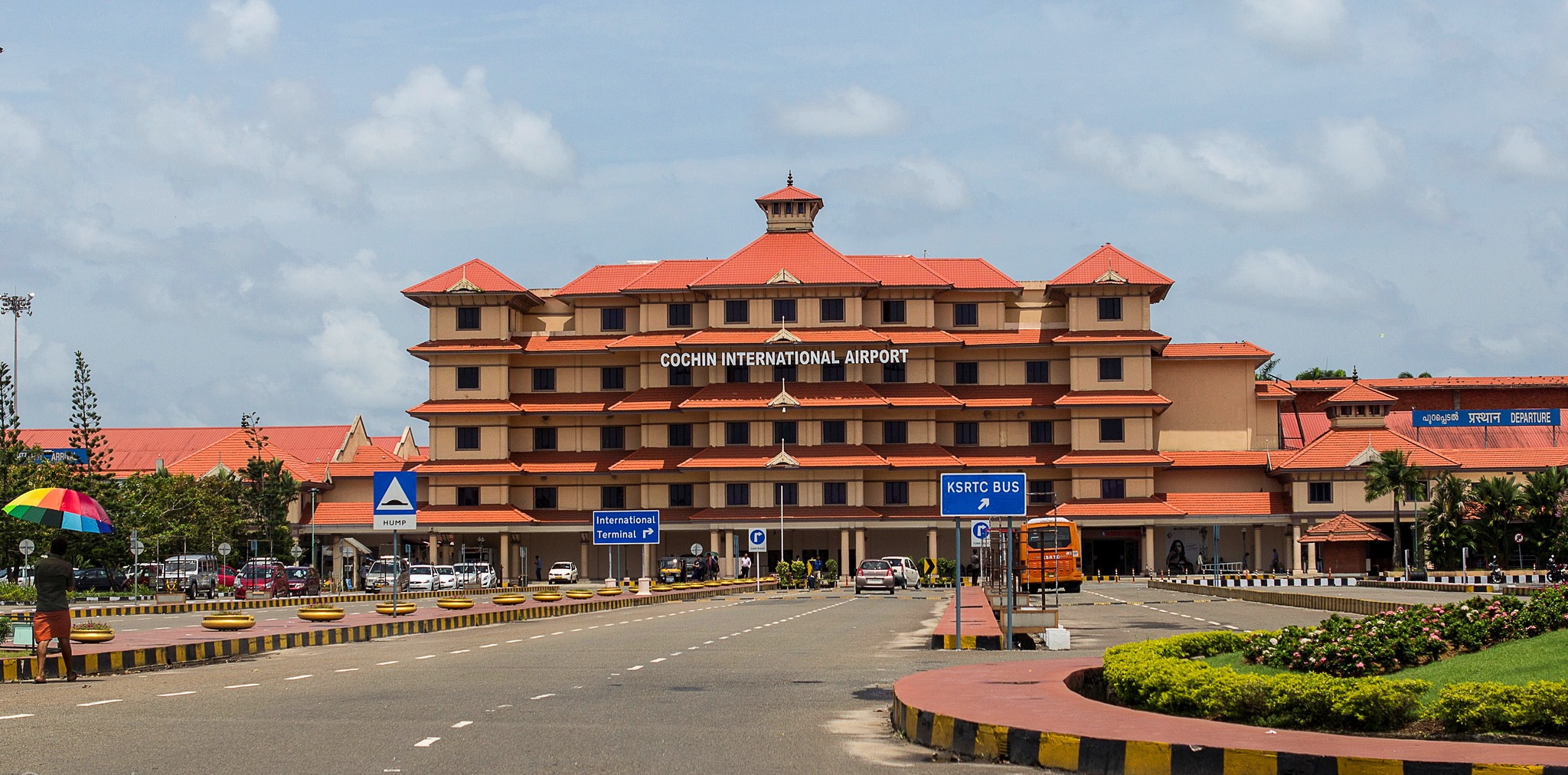
Cochin International Airport

In 1996, Nayanar took over as chairman of the Cochin International Airport (CIAL) project. The construction picked up momentum during this period and Nayanar ensured that the airport project received special attention from the State Government and gave his unstinted support to CIAL. By 1997, substantial land was taken into CIAL possession through negotiated settlements. On 25 May 1999 in the presence of then President of India, K. R. Narayanan inaugurated the airport.

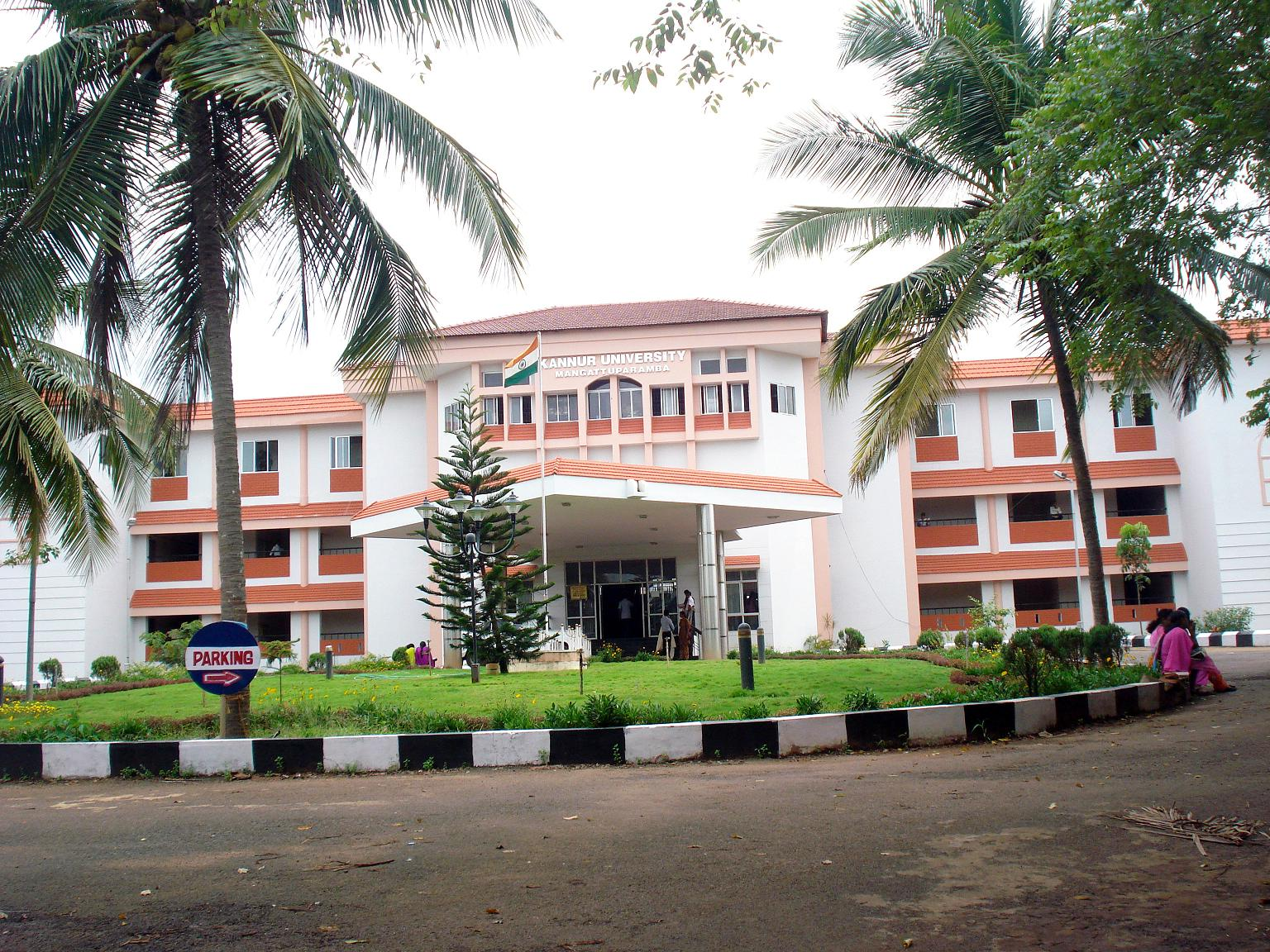
Kannur University

The Kannur International Airport project was conceived in 1996 when Nayanar was the Chief Minister of Kerala. Nayanar was instrumental for the establishment of Kannur University. The university was inaugurated on 2 March 1996 by Nayanar. The objective of the Kannur University Act, 1996 was to establish in the state of Kerala a teaching, residential and affiliating university to provide for the development of higher education in Kasargod and Kannur revenue Districts and the Mananthavady Taluk of Wayanad District.

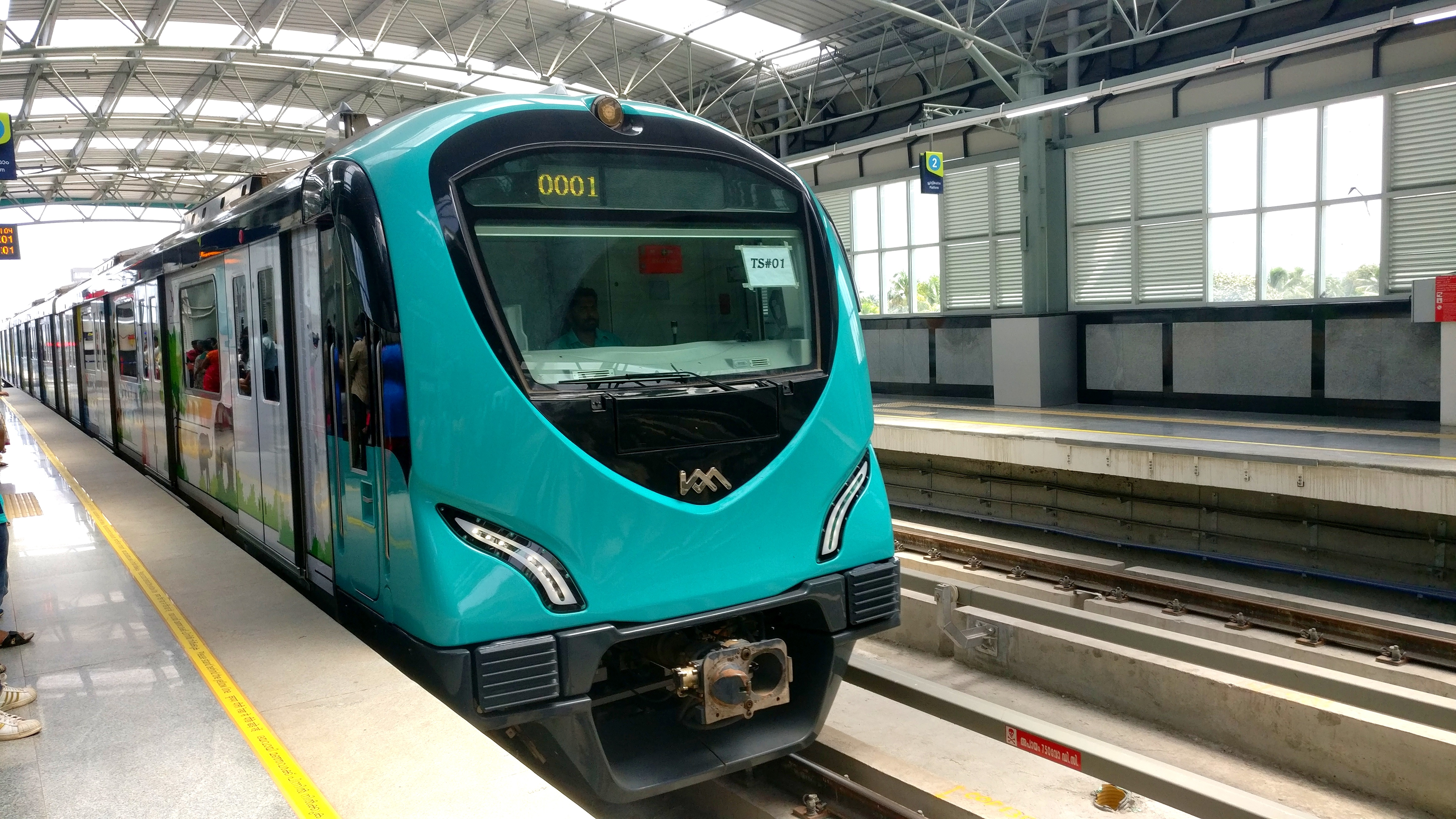
Kochi Metro

The government led by Nayanar ideated the Kochi Metro Project in 1999. The cabinet meeting held on 21 July 1999, of the then LDF government, assigned Rail India Technological and Economic Services (RITES) for the feasibility study for a metro rapid transport system in Kochi. The techno-economic feasibility study for a Metro Rapid Transit System in Kochi was completed in 1999, which was begun in the same year, by Rail India Technological and Economic Services (RITES). The techno-feasibility study report was submitted to the state government in 1999.

== Literary works ==
Nayanar has authored several works in both English and Malayalam. He was also an occasional poet. A few notable works are:

1. Olivukala Smrithkal: Memories of Hideout Days > Olivukala Smrithikal-.
2. Doha Diary
3. Marxism-Oru Mukhavara (Marxism-An introduction)
4. Nehru-Gandhi Oru Padanam (Nehru-Gandhi A Study)
5. Karl Marx
6. American Diary
7. Ente China Diary (My China Diary)
8. Parliamentum Chila Vasthuthakalum (Parliament and Some Facts)
9. Samara Theecholayil

Nayanar had been a correspondent and editor for Deshabhimani. He had worked in Chennai as Deshabhimani correspondent. He used to write a weekly column in Deshabhimani, Munnottu (Forward).

== In popular culture ==
Nayanar was renowned for his humorous remarks and speeches. During his third term as Chief Minister, Nayanar also used to conduct a public interaction show, "Mukhya Mantriyodu Chothikyuka" ("Ask the Chief Minister") in Asianet TV channel.

== Personal life ==
Nayanar married Sarada Teacher, niece of K. P. R. Gopalan in 1958. They had two sons and two daughters.

== Death ==
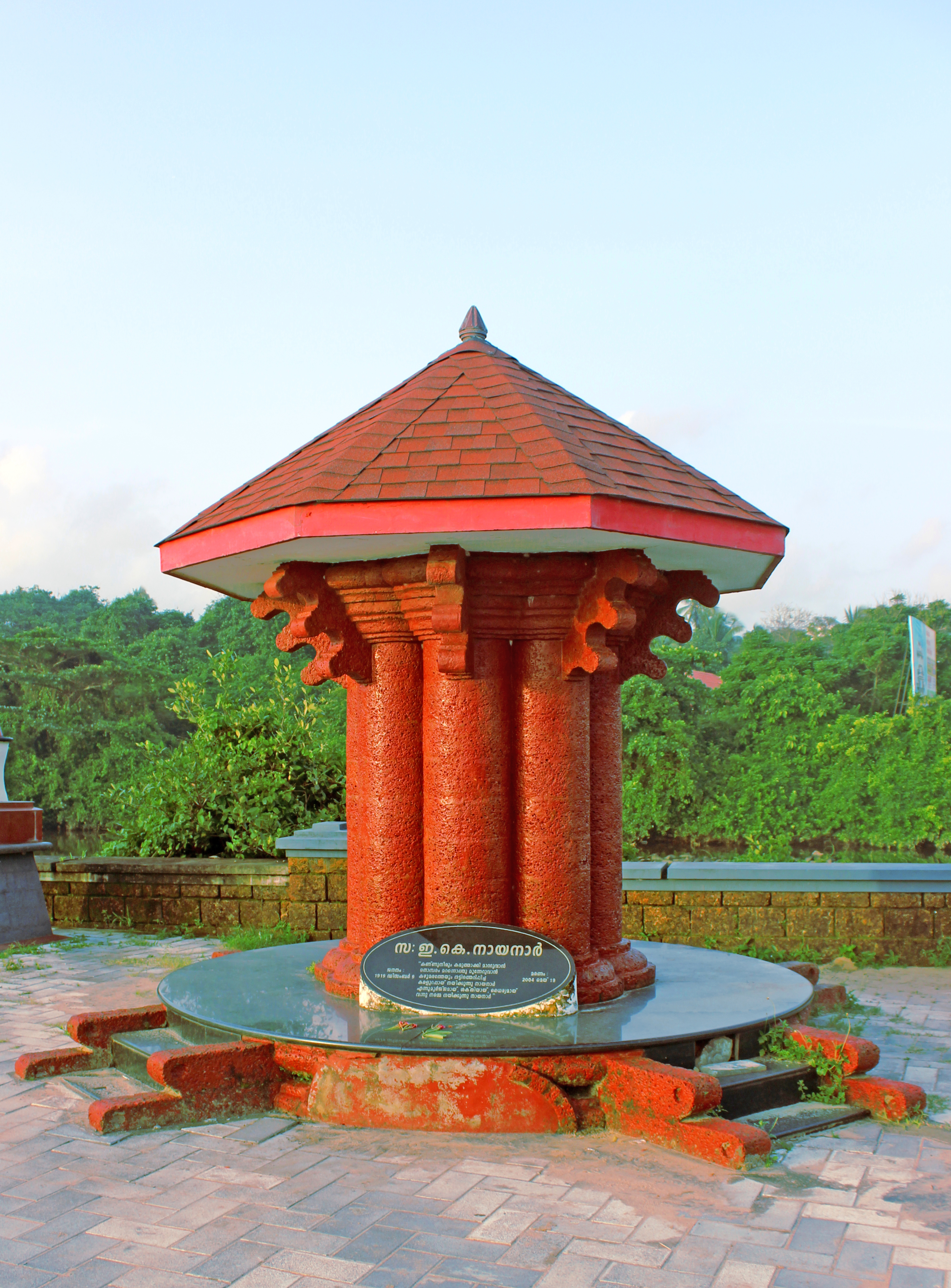
E. K. Nayanar Memorial at Payyambalam Beach, where he was cremated.

Nayanar was admitted to the AIIMS on 26 April for advanced treatment of diabetes, from which he suffered for a long time, after a brief stay at the Medical College Hospital in Thiruvananthapuram earlier. His condition became worse following a massive heart attack, which was his third, on 6 May when he was put on the life support system. He died on 19 May 2004 at the age of 85 after suffering from heart and kidney failure. He was cremated with full state honours at Payyambalam Beach, Kannur. He is survived by his wife, children, in-laws and grandchildren.

== See also ==
- Chief Ministers of Kerala
- Kerala Council of Ministers
- Politics in Kerala

Preceded by C.H. Mohammed Koya	Chief Minister of Kerala; 1980–1981	Succeeded by K. Karunakaran
Preceded by K. Karunakaran	Chief Minister of Kerala; 1987–1991	Succeeded by K. Karunakaran
Preceded by A. K. Antony	Chief Minister of Kerala; 1996–2001	Succeeded by A. K. Antony
