= Chinakkathoor Pooram =

Festival in Kerala, India

mannarkkad pooram
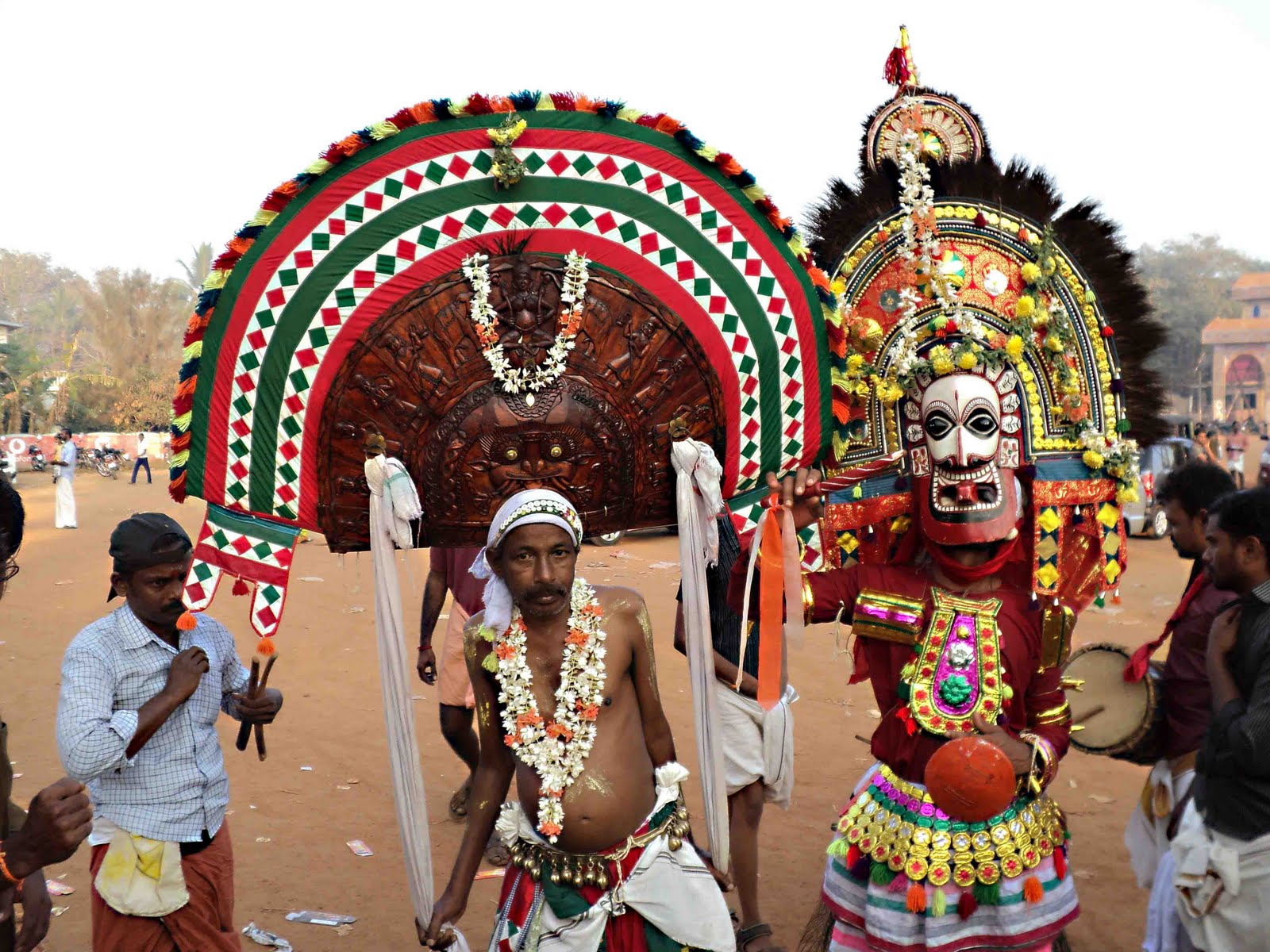
- Chinakkathoor Pooram (2018)
- Official name: ചിനക്കത്തൂർ പൂരം
- Observed by: Malayalees
- Type: Pooram
- Significance: One of the famous poorams in northern Kerala
- Begins: Makam day in the Malayalam month of Kumbham (February–March)
- Frequency: Annual

Chinakkathoor Pooram is a festival held annually at the Chinakkathoor Bhagavathi temple at Palappuram in Palakkad district of Kerala, India. A huge procession of 27 festooned tuskers is the highlight of the festival. The festival is celebrated in the Kumbham month of Malayalam calendar.

Locality performs traditional art forms like Vellattu, Theyyam, Poothanum thirayum, Kaalavela, Kuthiravela, Aandi Vedan, Karivela on the Panchavadyam or the temple orchestra. The popular ritualistic show puppetry, Tholpavakoothu, is performed at the temple premises every evening. This show continues for 17 days before conclusion of the festival i.e. pooram. Sixteen decorated models of the kuthira (horse) and eight kaala (bull) are brought ceremoniously to the temple by devotees in a grand procession.

Holiday is declared by the District Collector in all government offices and educational institutions of Ottapalam municipality and the Lakkidi-Perur-I grama panchayat.

== How to reach ==
=== By rail ===
Nearest railway station is Ottapalam which is about 5.1 km from the shrine. It is one of the major railway stations between Palakkad and Shoranur in the Konkan route and Wadakkanchery in the Kanyakumari/Alapuzha route.

=== By bus ===
Public as well as private buses running on Palakkad-Shoranur (Kulappully) State Highway passes through Ottappalam.

=== By air ===
Nearest airport is Coimbatore in the neighbouring state of Tamil Nadu which is about 85 km from shrine.

Calicut International Airport, Karippur, Cochin International Airport, Nedumbassery, and Coimbatore Domestic Airport are the other nearest airports.

In Kerala, festival dates are decided in accordance with the Malayalam calendar and the local traditions and customs.
