= Chinakkathoor Temple =

Hindu temple in Kerala, India

Sree Chinakkathoor Bhagavathi Temple
- ശ്രീ ചിനക്കത്തൂർ ഭഗവതി ക്ഷേത്രം
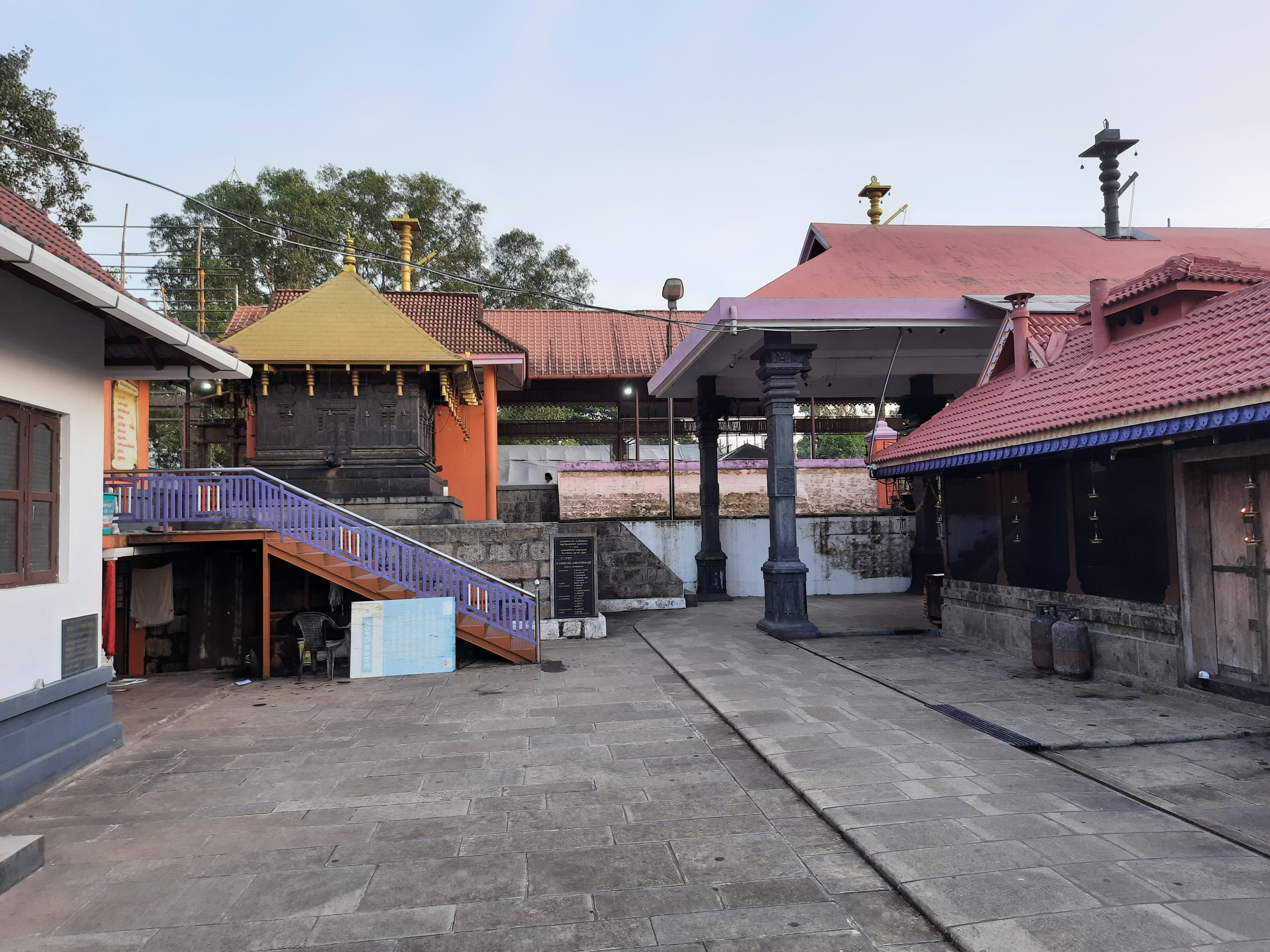
- Chinakkathoor temple

- Chinakkathoor Bhagavathy Temple, Palappuram, Palakkad, (Kerala) Chinakkathoor Temple (India)

Religion
- Affiliation: Hinduism
- District: Palakkad
- Deity: Bhagavathi
- Festival: Chinakkathoor Pooram
- Governing body: Chinakkathoor Bhagavathy Devaswom

Location
- Location: Palappuram
- State: Kerala
- Country: India
- Interactive map of Sree Chinakkathoor Bhagavathi Temple
- Coordinates: 10.770623°N 76.418588°E

Architecture
- Type: Dravidian architecture
- Style: Traditional Kerala style

Specifications
- Direction of façade: South
- Temple: One
- Elevation: 84.34 m (277 ft)

Chinakkathoor Bhagavathi Temple is a Hindu temple located at Palappuram near Ottapalam in Palakkad district of Kerala, India. The temple is well-known for the Chinakkathoor pooram held annually in the Malayalam month of Kumbham.

There are two shrines, Thazhekavu (lower shrine) and Melakavu (upper shrine). Melakavu is believed to be older than Thazekavu. The priests of the upper shrine traditionally come from the Kulangara Nair family of Palappuram. Namboothiri priests do the poojas in the lower shrine and in the ten days of pooram. They are in charge of the upper shrine as well. There is a shrine dedicated to Lord Ganapathy who is believed to be in his divine "Vidya Ganapati" form, adjoining the temple complex near the iconic banyan tree.

== Chinakkathoor Pooram ==
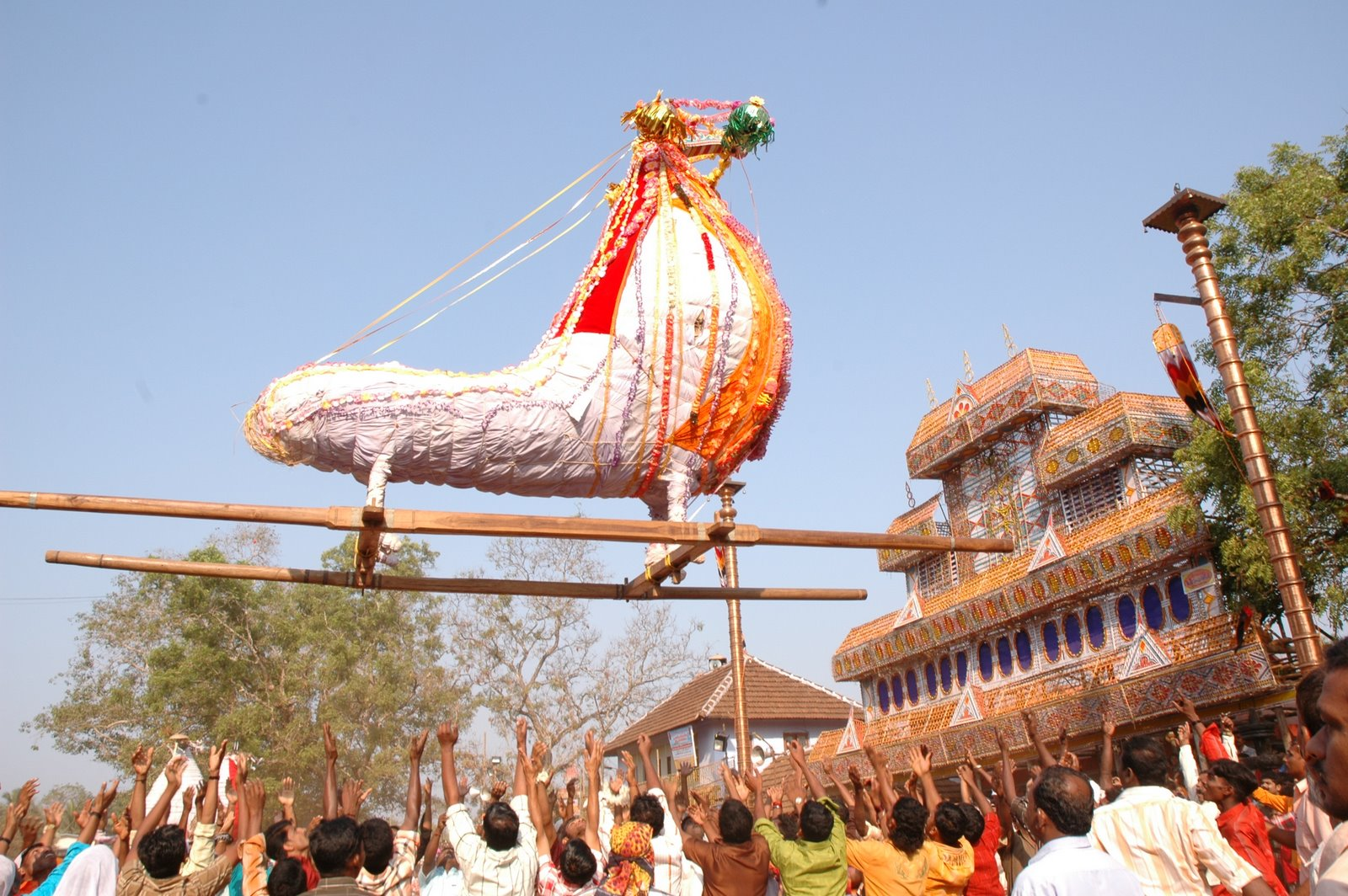
Kuthirakali during the pooram

Chinakkathoor pooram is celebrated every year during February and March (makam naal of Kumbham). The highlight of the evening festivities is a procession of 28 tuskers. Traditional performances of the Panchavadyam or the temple orchestra and various other art forms like Vellattu, Theyyam, Poothanum thirayum, Kaalavela, Kuthiravela, Aandi Vedan, Karivela, and so on are shown. The Tholppavakkoothu, a ritualistic shadow puppet show, is performed at the temple premises every evening for the 17 days preceding the concluding festival. The festival starts with Kuthirakali game and ends next day with Theru (Ratham), a decoration by Mudaliar tamils of Palappuram, and the procession of 16 models of the kuthira (horse) and the kaala (bull) brought ceremoniously to the temple by devotees. Unlike other Ratham in Tamil Nadu or Kalpathy, this is not pulled by Vatam (coir) and runs on wooden wheel.

== Getting there ==
Nearest railway station: Ottappalam, about 5 km (3.1 mi) from the shrine.

Nearest airport: Coimbatore in neighbouring state of Tamil Nadu, about 85 km (53 mi).

== See also ==
- Temples of Kerala
