= Ottapalam Assembly constituency =

Constituency of the Kerala legislative assembly in India

Ottapalam
- Constituency No. 52 for the Kerala Legislative Assembly
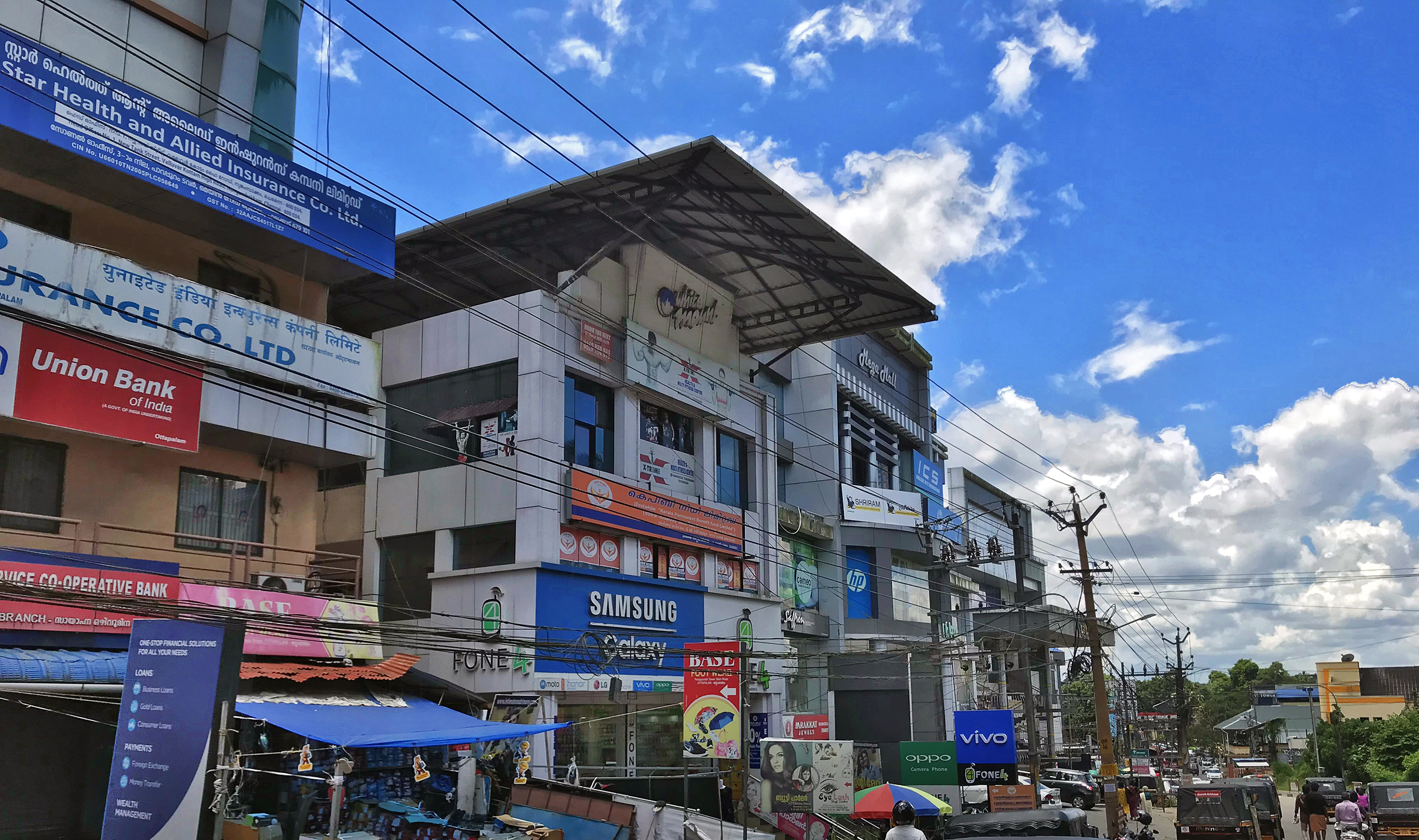
- Ottapalam town

Constituency details
- Country: India
- Region: South India
- State: Kerala
- District: Palakkad
- Established: 1957
- Total electors: 2,07,723 (2021)
- Reservation: None

Member of Legislative Assembly
- 16th Kerala Legislative Assembly
- Incumbent K. Premkumar
- Party: CPI(M)
- Alliance: LDF
- Elected year: 2026

Ottapalam State assembly constituency is one of the 140 state legislative assembly constituencies in Kerala in southern India. It is also one of the seven state legislative assembly constituencies included in Palakkad Lok Sabha constituency. As of the 2026 Assembly elections, the current MLA is K. Premkumar of CPI(M).

== Local self-governed segments ==
Ottapalam Assembly constituency is composed of the following local self-governed segments:

Sl no.	Name	Status (Grama panchayat/Municipality)	Taluk
1	Ottapalam	Municipality	Ottapalam
2	Ambalappara	Grama panchayat	Ottapalam
3	Kadampazhipuram	Grama panchayat	Ottapalam
4	Karimpuzha	Grama panchayat	Ottapalam
5	Lakkidi-Perur	Grama panchayat	Ottapalam
6	Pookkottukavu	Grama panchayat	Ottapalam
7	Sreekrishnapuram	Grama panchayat	Ottapalam
8	Thachanattukara	Grama panchayat	Mannarkkad

== Members of the Legislative Assembly ==
The following list contains all members of Kerala Legislative Assembly who have represented the constituency:

Election	Name	Party
1957	P. V. Kunhunni Nair	Communist Party of India
1960	P. V. Kunhunni Nair	Communist Party of India
1967	P. P. Krishnan	Communist Party of India (Marxist)
1970	P. P. Krishnan	Communist Party of India (Marxist)
1977	P. Balan	Indian National Congress
1980	V. C. Kabeer	Indian National Congress (U)
1982	V. C. Kabeer	Independent
1987	K. Sankaranarayanan	Indian National Congress
1991	V. C. Kabeer	Indian Congress (Socialist)
1996	V. C. Kabeer	Indian Congress (Socialist)
2001	V. C. Kabeer	Nationalist Congress Party
2006	M. Hamsa	Communist Party of India (Marxist)
2011	M. Hamsa	Communist Party of India (Marxist)
2016	P. Unni	Communist Party of India (Marxist)
2021	K. Premkumar	Communist Party of India (Marxist)
2026	K. Premkumar	Communist Party of India (Marxist)

== Election results ==
Percentage change (±%) denotes the change in the number of votes from the immediate previous election.

=== 2026 ===
2026 Kerala Legislative Assembly election: Ottapalam
Party	Candidate	Votes	%	±%
CPI(M)	K. Premkumar	75,362	44.30	▼2.15
Independent	P. K. Sasi	48,585	28.56	▼8.49
BJP	Major Ravi	42,476	24.97	▲9.42
Independent	Sasi P. K.	1,062	0.62	−
BSP	K. P. Rajeesh	1,025	0.60	▲0.18
Independent	Muhammed Asharaf V. H.	459	0.27	−
NOTA	None of the above	1,135	0.67	▲0.03
Margin of victory		26,777	15.74	▲5.78
Turnout		1,70,104		
CPI(M) hold		Swing		

=== 2021 ===
There were 2,07,723 registered voters in the constituency for the 2021 election.

2021 Kerala Legislative Assembly election: Ottapalam
Party	Candidate	Votes	%	±%
CPI(M)	K. Premkumar	74,859	46.45	▲1.74
INC	P. Sarin	59,707	37.05	▲3.05
BJP	P. Venugopalan	25,056	15.55	▼2.83
BSP	P. P. Sivan	672	0.42	▼0.12
NOTA	None of the above	867	0.64	−
Margin of victory		15,152	9.96	▼0.78
Turnout		1,61,509	77.75	▲1.75
CPI(M) hold		Swing	▲1.65	

=== 2016 ===
There were 1,97,646 registered voters in the constituency for the 2016 election.

2016 Kerala Legislative Assembly election: Ottapalam
Party	Candidate	Votes	%	±%
CPI(M)	P. Unni	67,161	44.71	▼4.76
INC	Shanimol Usman	51,073	34.00	▼5.43
BJP	P. Venugopalan	27,605	18.38	▲11.05
SDPI	A. A. Sulfikar	1,166	0.78	▼0.69
NOTA	None of the above	1,012	0.67	−
BSP	K. T. Padmini	811	0.54	▼0.18
Independent	S. R. Prakash	805	0.54	−
SS	M. S. Suneesh	399	0.27	−
Independent	Suresh Velayudhan	180	0.12	−
Margin of victory		16,088	10.71	▲0.67
Turnout		1,50,212	76.00	▲0.92
CPI(M) hold		Swing	▼4.76	

=== 2011 ===
There were 1,75,066 registered voters in the constituency for the 2011 election.

2011 Kerala Legislative Assembly election: Ottapalam
Party	Candidate	Votes	%	±%
CPI(M)	M. Hamza	65,023	49.47	−
INC	V. K. Sreekandan	51,820	39.43	
BJP	P. Venugopalan	9,631	7.33	
SDPI	E. S. Kajahussain	1,933	1.47	
Independent	M. Hamza	1,097	0.83	−
BSP	K. T. Padmini	947	0.72	−
Independent	N. Hamza	604	0.46	▼0.31
Independent	Aravindan Karimpuzha	379	0.29	−
Margin of victory		13,203	10.04	
Turnout		1,31,434	75.08	
CPI(M) hold		Swing		

=== 1952 ===
1952 Madras Legislative Assembly election: Ottappalam
Party	Candidate	Votes	%	±%
KMPP	M. Narayana Kurup	12,277	33.74%	
INC	C. P. Madhavan Nair	9,518	26.16%	
Socialist	T. Madhavan Nair	8,185	22.50%	
Independent	C. Krishnan Nair	5,571	15.31%	
Independent	C. P. Narayaana Menon	832	2.29%	
Margin of victory		2,759	7.58%	
Turnout		36,383	56.69%	
Registered electors		64,179		
KMPP win (new seat)				

== See also ==
- Ottapalam
- Palakkad district
- List of constituencies of the Kerala Legislative Assembly
- 2016 Kerala Legislative Assembly election
