= Sreekrishnapuram Assembly constituency =

Indian state legislative assembly constituency

Coordinates: 10.91°N 76.41°E

Sreekrishnapuram
- Former constituency for the Kerala Legislative Assembly

Constituency details
- Country: India
- Region: South India
- State: Kerala
- District: Palakkad
- Established: 1965
- Abolished: 2008
- Total electors: 141928 (2006)
- Reservation: None

Sreekrishnapuram Assembly constituency was one of the 140 state legislative assembly constituencies in Kerala state in southern India, before the 2008 delimitation of constituencies. Previously, it was also one of the state legislative assembly constituencies included in Palakkad Lok Sabha constituency.

== History ==
Sreekrishnapuram Assembly constituency was formed in 1965. C. Govinda Panicker was first elected MLA from the constituency. The constituency was abolished in the 2008 delimitation. After the delimitation, Vellinezhi Panchayat and Cherpulassery Municipality, which were in the old constituency, became part of Shornur Assembly constituency, and Kadampazhipuram, Karimpuzha and Sreekrishnapuram panchayats became part of Ottapalam Assembly constituency.

== Members of the Legislative Assembly ==
The following list contains all members of Kerala legislative assembly who have represented the constituency:

Election	Niyama Sabha	Name	Party	Tenure
1965	3rd	C. Govinda Panicker	Communist Party of India	1965 – 1967
1967	4th	C. Govinda Panicker	Communist Party of India	1967 – 1970
1970	4th	C. Govinda Panicker	Communist Party of India	1970 – 1977
1977	5th	K. Sukumaranunni	Indian National Congress	1977 – 1980
1980	6th	K. Sankaranarayanan	Indian National Congress	1980 – 1982
1982	7th	E. Padmanabhan	Communist Party of India	1982 – 1987
1987	8th	P. Balan	Indian National Congress	1987 – 1991
1991	9th	P. Balan	Indian National Congress	1991 – 1996
1996	10th	Girija Surendran	Communist Party of India	1996 – 2001
2001	11th	Girija Surendran	Communist Party of India	2001 – 2006
2006	12th	K. S. Saleekha	Communist Party of India	2006 – 2011
