= Shornur Assembly constituency =

Constituency of the Kerala legislative assembly in India

Shornur
- Constituency No. 51 for the Kerala Legislative Assembly
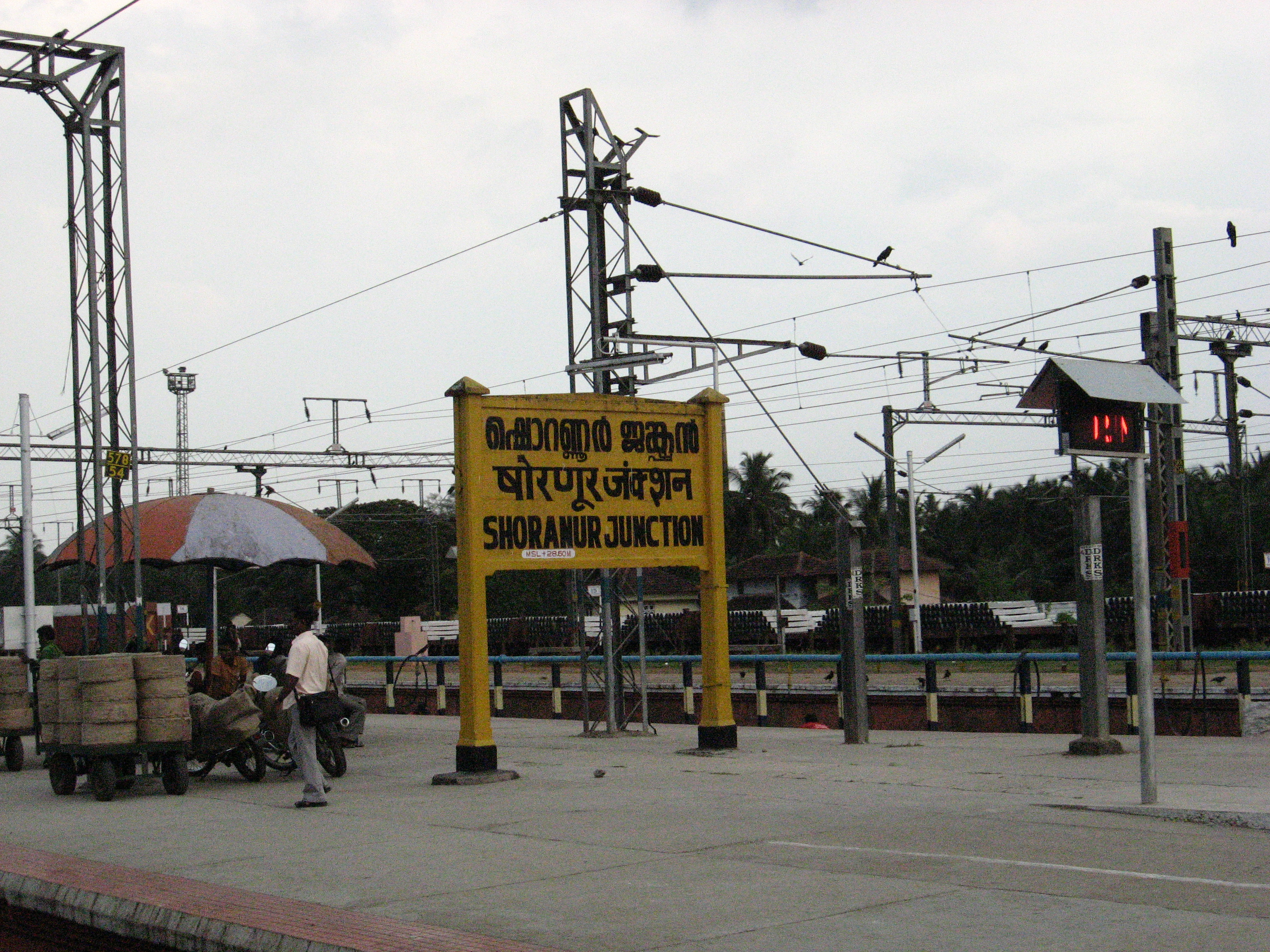
- Shoranur Junction railway station, the largest railway station in the state in terms of area.

Constituency details
- Country: India
- Region: South India
- State: Kerala
- District: Palakkad
- Established: 2008
- Total electors: 1,51,911 (2021)
- Reservation: None

Member of Legislative Assembly
- 16th Kerala Legislative Assembly
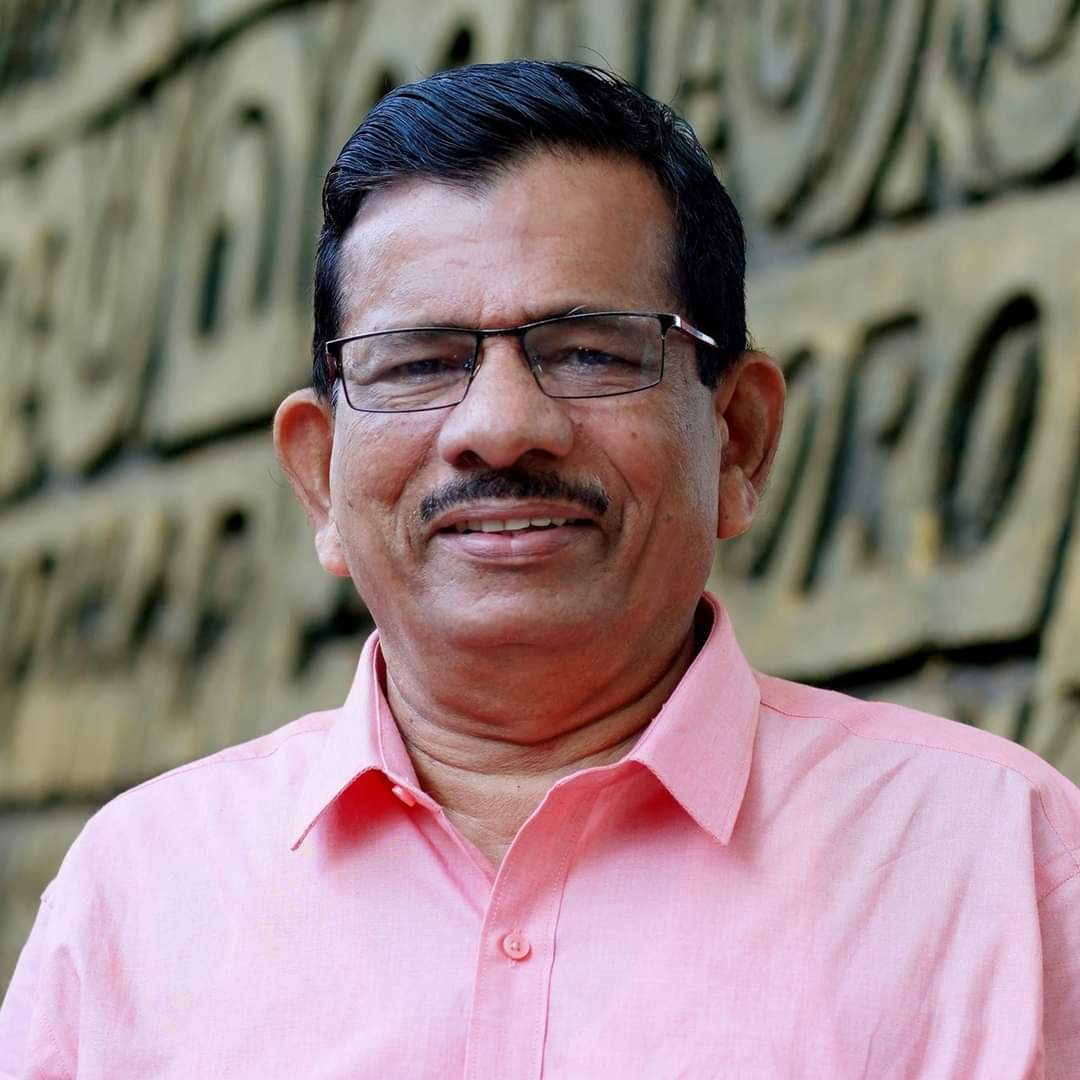
- Incumbent P. Mammikutty
- Party: CPI(M)
- Alliance: LDF
- Elected year: 2026

Shornur State assembly constituency is one of the 140 state legislative assembly constituencies in Kerala in southern India. It is also one of the seven state legislative assembly constituencies included in Palakkad Lok Sabha constituency. As of the 2026 Assembly elections, the current MLA is P. Mammikutty of CPI(M).

== Local self-governed segments ==
Shornur Assembly constituency is composed of the following local self-governed segments:

Sl no.	Name	Status (Grama panchayat/Municipality)	Taluk
1	Shoranur	Municipality	Ottapalam
2	Cherpulassery	Municipality	Ottapalam
3	Ananganadi	Grama panchayat	Ottapalam
4	Chalavara	Grama panchayat	Ottapalam
5	Nellaya	Grama panchayat	Ottapalam
6	Thrikkadeeri	Grama panchayat	Ottapalam
7	Vaniyamkulam	Grama panchayat	Ottapalam
8	Vellinezhi	Grama panchayat	Ottapalam

== Members of the Legislative Assembly ==
The following list contains all members of Kerala Legislative Assembly who have represented Shornur Assembly constituency during the period of various assemblies:

Year	Member	Political party
2011	K. S. Saleekha	Communist Party of India (Marxist)
2016	P. K. Sasi	Communist Party of India (Marxist)
2021	P. Mammikutty	Communist Party of India (Marxist)
2026	P. Mammikutty	Communist Party of India (Marxist)

== Election results ==
Percentage change (±%) denotes the change in the number of votes from the immediate previous election.

=== 2026 ===
2026 Kerala Legislative Assembly election: Shornur
Party	Candidate	Votes	%	±%
CPI(M)	P. Mammikutty	70,583	44.08	▼4.90
INC	P. Harigovindan	54,066	33.77	▲8.87
BJP	Sanku T. Das	33,264	20.77	▼3.57
SDPI	Aboobacker	1,263	0.78	▼0.04
NOTA	None of the above	947	0.59	▲0.14
Margin of victory		16,517	10.31	▼13.84
Turnout		1,60,123		
CPI(M) hold		Swing		

=== 2021 ===
There were 1,93,992 registered voters in the constituency for the 2021 election.

2021 Kerala Legislative Assembly election: Shornur
Party	Candidate	Votes	%	±%
CPI(M)	P. Mammikutty	74,400	48.98	▲2.27
INC	T. H. Firoz Babu	37,726	24.83	▼4.55
BJP	Sandeep Varier	36,973	24.34	−
SDPI	Muhammad Musthafa	1,251	0.82	▼0.06
BSP	T. C. Ayyappankutty	883	0.58	▲0.04
NOTA	None of the above	678	0.45	−
Margin of victory		36,674	24.15	▲6.82
Turnout		1,51,911	78.31	▲1.68
CPI(M) hold		Swing	▲2.27	

=== 2016 ===
There were 1,84,867 registered voters in the constituency for the 2016 election.

2016 Kerala Legislative Assembly election: Shornur
Party	Candidate	Votes	%	±%
CPI(M)	P. K. Sasi	66,165	46.71	▼2.86
INC	C. Sangeetha	41,618	29.38	▼8.97
BDJS	V. P. Chandran	28,836	20.36	−
SDPI	M. Saidalavi	1,246	0.88	▼1.67
Independent	Harish Muhammed	882	0.62	−
NOTA	None of the above	800	0.56	−
BSP	Anandan K. K.	764	0.54	▼0.20
Independent	A. Radhakrishnan	697	0.49	−
SS	P. K. Anumon	407	0.29	−
Independent	Moindeesa Moloor	247	0.17	−
Margin of victory		24,547	17.33	▲6.11
Turnout		1,41,662	76.63	▲3.25
CPI(M) hold		Swing	▼2.86	

=== 2011 ===
There were 1,63,885 registered voters in the constituency for the 2011 election.

2011 Kerala Legislative Assembly election: Shornur
Party	Candidate	Votes	%	±%
CPI(M)	K. S. Saleekha	59,616	49.57	−
INC	Santha Jayaram	46,123	38.35	
BJP	V. B. Muralidharan	10,562	8.78	
SDPI	Khalid A.	3,065	2.55	
BSP	M. C. Velayudhan	894	0.74	−
Margin of victory		13,493	11.22	
Turnout		1,20,260	73.38	▲1.25
CPI(M) win (new seat)				

== See also ==
- Shornur
- Palakkad district
- List of constituencies of the Kerala Legislative Assembly
- 2016 Kerala Legislative Assembly election
