= P. Mammikutty =

Indian politician

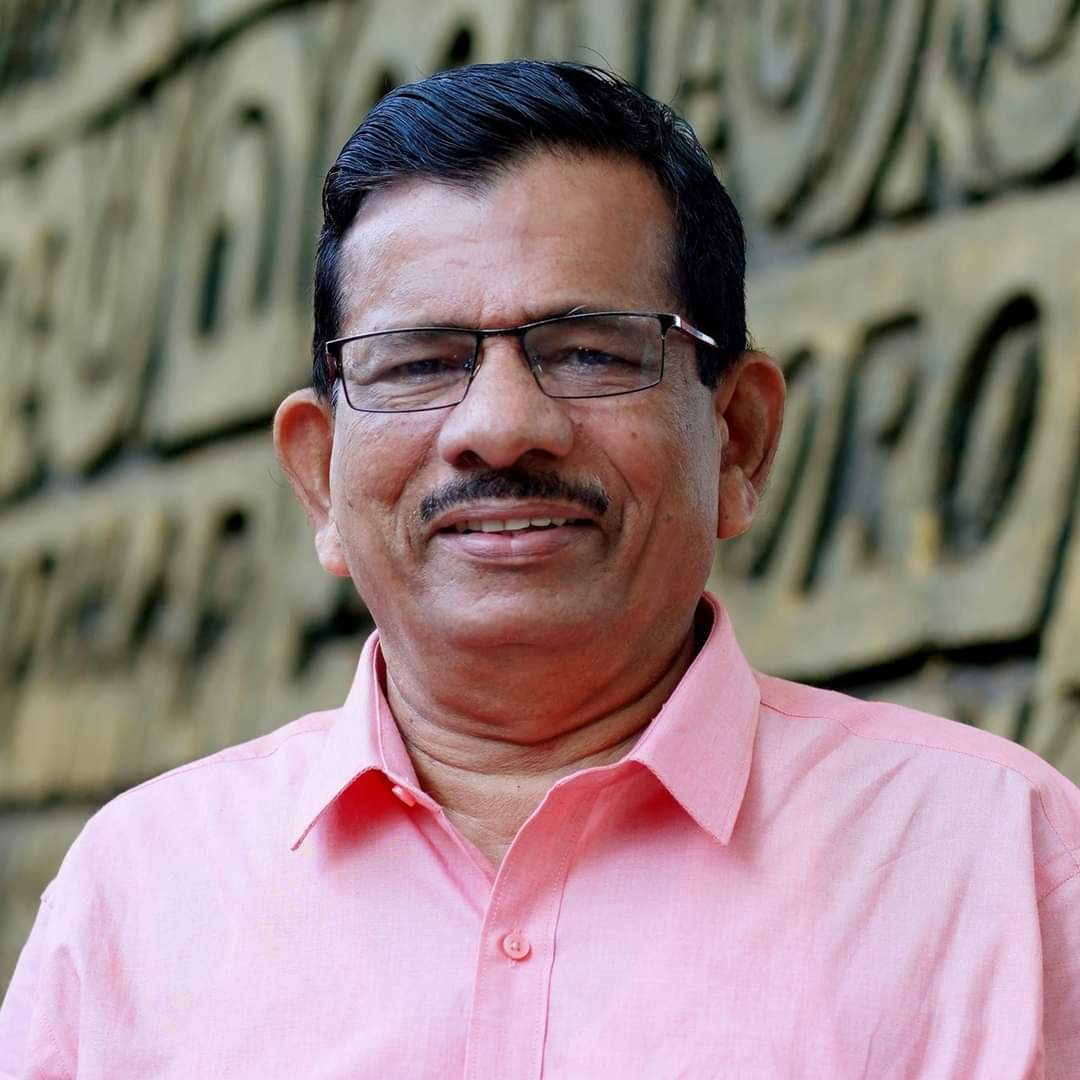

Member of the Kerala Legislative Assembly
- Incumbent
- Assumed office May 2021
- Preceded by: P. K. Sasi
- Constituency: Shornur

Personal details
- Born: Kerala Pachath house Kudallur post Thrithala
- Party: Communist Party of India (Marxist)
- Spouse: Fathima
- Children: 2
- Website: www.kerala.gov.in

Pachath Mammikutty is an Indian politician serving as the MLA of Shornur Constituency since May 2021.
