= P. Unni =

Indian politician

- പി.ഉണ്ണി
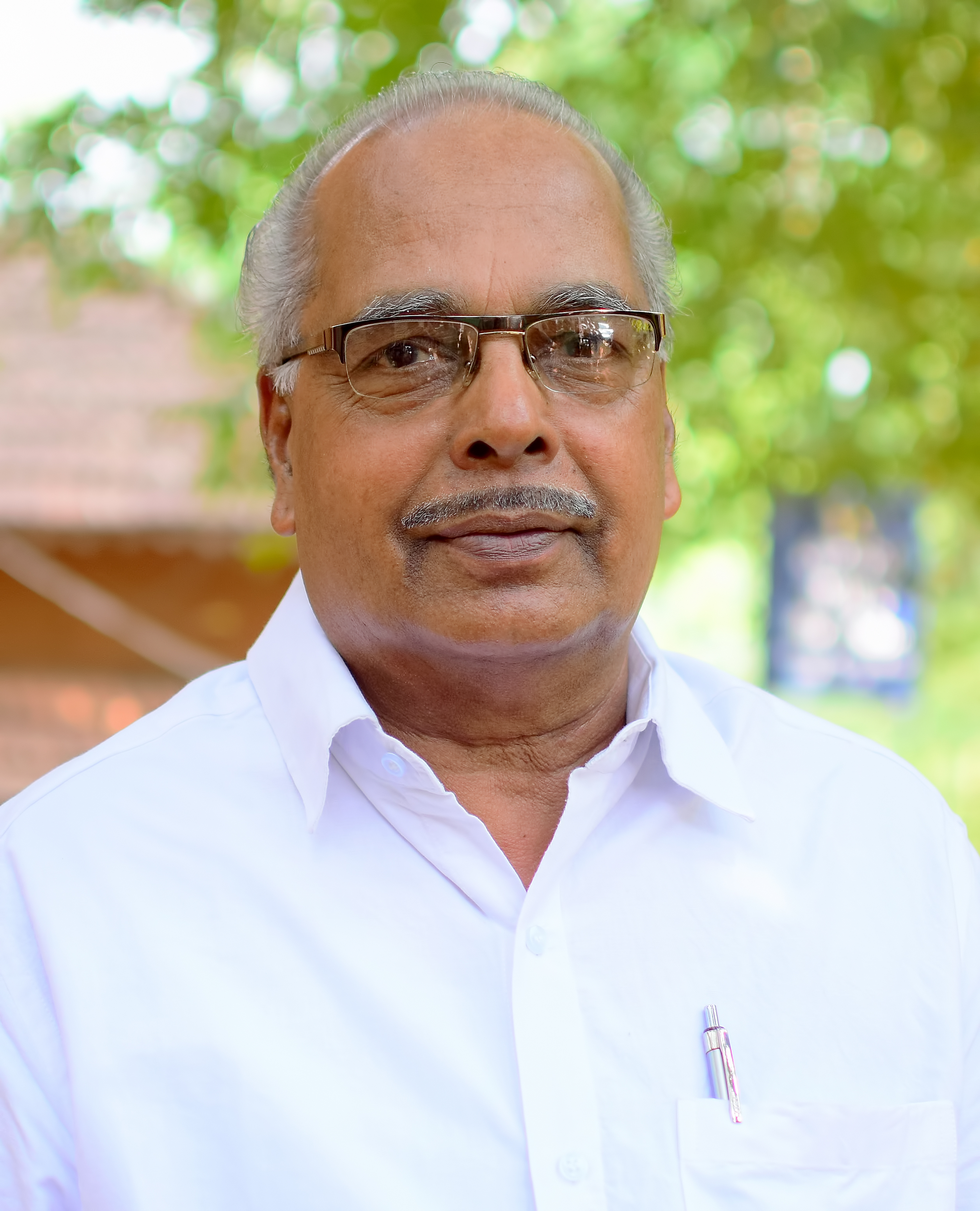

Member of the Kerala Legislative Assembly
- In office 2 June 2016 – 23 May 2021
- Preceded by: M. Hamsa
- Succeeded by: K. Premkumar
- Constituency: Ottapalam

Personal details
- Born: 11 July 1947 (age 78)
- Party: Communist Party of India (Marxist)

P. Unni (born 11 July 1947) is an Indian politician of the Communist Party of India (Marxist). He was a member of 14th Kerala Legislative Assembly and represented Ottapalam constituency.

He also served as Palakkad District Secretary of Communist Party of India (Marxist) for over 15 years and currently state committee member of Communist Party of India (Marxist).

== See also ==
- Kerala Legislative Assembly
- M. Hamsa
- K. D. Prasenan
- K. Krishnankutty
- A. K. Balan
- K. Babu
- P. K. Sasi
- K. V. Vijayadas
- Muhammed Muhsin
