= A. C. Shanmughadas =

Indian politician (1939–2013)

Minister for Health and Sports, Kerala
- In office May 1996 – January 2000
- Preceded by: V.M. Sudheeran
- Succeeded by: V.C Kabeer

Minister for Health, Kerala
- In office April 1987 – June 1991
- Preceded by: R. Ramachandran Nair
- Succeeded by: K.P. Ramachandran Nair

Minister for Community Development and Sports, Kerala
- In office January 1980 – October 1981
- Preceded by: President's Rule
- Succeeded by: K. Karunakaran

Member of Kerala Legislative Assembly
- In office 1980–2006
- Preceded by: P. K. Sankarankutty
- Succeeded by: A. K. Saseendran
- Constituency: Balussery
- In office 1970–1977
- Preceded by: AK Appu
- Succeeded by: P. K. Sankarankutty
- Constituency: Balussery

Aniyeri Cheenan Shanmughadas (5 January 1939 – 27 June 2013) was an Indian politician. He was Kerala MLA for Balussery from 1970 until 2006.

== Early life ==
A. C. Shanmughadas was born on 5 January 1939 in Dharmadom near Thalassery, Kannur district, as the son of Cheenan Kunjiraman and Aniyeri Vengilatt Saradamma. After completing school education, he started college education in Kottakkal Arya Vaidya Sala College. Like most of the politicians in India, he also started his political career through campus politics. He was one of the founding members of Kerala Students Union (KSU). After completing his college education, he became an active politician. He also participated in the Goa Liberation Struggle in 1961.

== Political life ==
Shanmughadas was first elected from Balussery constituency in 1970. He later went to get elected for seven times consecutively from the same constituency - from 1980 to 2006. He served as minister thrice - all in the governments headed by E. K. Nayanar. In the first Nayanar ministry which came in 1980, he was the minister for Health, Employment & Sports. He resigned his post on 16 October 1981, when his party, along with Kerala Congress (M) and Kerala Congress (B), withdrew the support for the ministry, which resulted in the fall of Nayanar ministry. In the second and third Nayanar ministries, which came in 1987 and 1991 respectively, he got the same portfolios as in the first ministry (with the exception of employment). From 1982 to 1999, he was the legislative leader of the party.

Shanmughadas served as the State Secretary of K.S.U. and Indian Youth Congress during 1966-69 period, with A. K. Antony as the President. He briefly served as the secretary of Malappuram district Congress Committee, and later served as the President of Kozhikode from 1973 to 1978. When Congress party was split in 1978, he joined the faction led by D. Devaraj Urs, called Indian Congress (Socialist) a.k.a. Congress (S). He later stood firmly with Left Democratic Front until his death.

When Congress (S) was split in 1986, he joined the faction headed by Sarat Chandra Sinha. It was this faction which led to the formation of Nationalist Congress Party (NCP) headed by Sharad Pawar in 1999. When this party was formed, a rift occurred, and Shanmughadas, then the state cabinet minister of Kerala, resigned his post. His colleague V. C. Kabeer, then the member from Ottapalam legislative constituency, and the member of a faction which continued to be known as Congress (S), succeeded him.

Shanmughadas was also the Chairman of KANFED and a member of Kerala Granthasala Sangham and Kozhikode Regional Transport Authority. He also served as the editor of various weeklies like 'Dharmachakra', 'Yuvatha' and 'Nireekshanam' weeklies. During his last days, he worked as the state President of NCP.

== Electoral History ==
=== Lok Sabha ===
Year	Constituency	Party	Votes	%	Opponent	Party	Votes	%	Result	Margin	%
1998	Cannanore	IND	378,285	46.17	Mullappally Ramachandran	INC	380,465	46.44	Lost	▼2,180	▼0.27

== Death ==
Shanmughadas died of a cardiac arrest on 27 June 2013 at the age of 74. He was not keeping good health for a while, due to various problems like diabetes, hypertension and high cholesterol. He also suffered from cirrhosis and heart disease. On the day of his death, he conducted a memorial programme in memory of his political mentor C. K. Govindan Nair, whose death anniversary fell on that day, and collapsed while speaking. He was immediately rushed to Kozhikode Medical College Hospital, where he was pronounced dead at 9:15 PM. Shanmughadas was cremated with full state honours at his home premises the next day. He is survived by his wife K. Parukutty and two daughters.
