= Vayilyamkunnu Bhagavathi Temple =

- Vayilyamkunnu Bhagavathy Temple, Kadampazhipuram, Palakkad, Kerala

Religion
- Affiliation: Hinduism
- District: Palakkad
- Deity: Bhagavathy

Location
- Location: Kadampazhipuram
- State: Kerala
- Country: India
- Interactive map of Vayilyamkunnu Bhagavathi Temple
- Coordinates: 10.875925°N 76.454351°E

Architecture
- Type: Architecture of Kerala

Specifications
- Temple: One
- Elevation: 106.8 m (350 ft)

Vayillyamkunnu Bhagavathi Temple is located at Kadampazhipuram, the historical land of Valluvanad Kerala, 24 km (15 mi) away from Palakkad on the way to Cherpulassery.
