= P. Balan =

Indian politician (1930–2004)

Member of the Kerala Legislative Assembly
- In office 1987–1996
- Preceded by: E. Padmanabhan
- Succeeded by: Girija Surendran
- Constituency: Sreekrishnapuram

Member of the Kerala Legislative Assembly
- In office 1977–1979
- Preceded by: P. P. Krishnan
- Succeeded by: V. C. Kabeer
- Constituency: Ottapalam

Personal details
- Born: 20 September 1930 British India
- Died: 6 August 2004 (aged 73) Coimbatore, Tamil Nadu
- Spouse: A. V. Bharathy
- Children: 2

P. Balan (20 September 1930 - 8 June 2004) was an Indian National Congress politician from Kerala, India. He represented Ottapalam Assembly constituency in 5th and Sreekrishnapuram Assembly constituency in the 8th and 9th Kerala Legislative Assemblies.

== Biography ==
P. Balan was born on September 20, 1930, the son of N. Sankaran Nair. As a child, he was sent to work at a wood cutting company by his family, due to poverty. But he escaped from that and later started his job as a sewing worker.

Balan and his wife A. V. Bharathy have two daughters. He died on June 8, 2004, at a private hospital in Coimbatore, following a respiratory illness.

== Political career ==
As a member of Indian National Congress, Balan served as general secretary of Kerala Pradesh Congress Committee and the president and secretary of Palakkad District Congress Committee. He also held several positions including member of Indian Coffee Board, president of INTUC and state president of Deseeya Karshaka Thozhilali Federation (National Agricultural Workers' Federation).

Balan represented Ottapalam Assembly constituency in the 5th Kerala Legislative Assembly and Sreekrishnapuram Assembly constituency in the 8th and 9th Kerala Legislative Assemblies.
