= Girija Surendran =

Indian politician

Member of Kerala Legislative Assembly
- In office 1996–2006
- Constituency: Sreekrishnapuram

Personal details
- Born: 15 May 1952 (age 73)
- Party: Communist Party of India (Marxist)
- Spouse: S. Surendran
- Children: 2

Girija Surendran (born 15 May 1952) is an Indian politician and former member of the Kerala Legislative Assembly. She is a central committee member of the All India Democratic Women's Association and a Kerala state committee member from the Palakkad district committee of the Communist Party of India (Marxist).

== Personal life ==
Girija was born on 15 May 1952 to K. Krishnan and C. R. Savitri, and graduated with a college degree. She is married to S. Surendran with 2 daughters and is a resident of Palakkad city in the state of Kerala.

== Political career ==
In the 1987 Kerala Legislative Assembly election, Girija Surendran was nominated by the Communist Party of India (Marxist) to contest as the party's candidate from the Palakkad constituency. She was defeated by the independent C. M. Sundaram while polling at 37.41% of the votes cast in her favor against 44.35% of the votes cast in Sundarama's favor. In the subsequent, 1991 Kerala Legislative Assembly election, she did not receive a nomination for candidacy. However, in the following 1996 Kerala Legislative Assembly election, she was re-nominated by the party for a second time and from the constituency of Sreekrishnapuram in the Palakkad district on this occasion. Surendram emerged as the winning candidate against two term incumbent P. Balan of the Indian National Congress polling at 48.78% of the votes cast in her favor against 45.23% of the votes in Balan's favor. In the 2001 Kerala Legislative Assembly election, she was re-nominated for candidacy on the seat and against the former member of parliament, V. S. Vijayaraghavan of the Indian National Congress. She emerged as the winning candidate for a second term winning by a very thin margin of 21 votes, polling at 47.26% of the votes cast in her favor against 47.25% of the votes cast in Vijayaraghavan's favor. In 2018, she was elected to the state committee of the Communist Party of India (Marxist) in Kerala.
