= K. Sukumaranunni =

Indian politician

Member of the Kerala Legislative Assembly
- In office 1977–1979
- Preceded by: C. Govinda Panicker
- Succeeded by: K. Sankaranarayanan
- Constituency: Sreekrishnapuram

Personal details
- Born: 11 April 1929 British India
- Died: 13 July 1984 (aged 55)
- Spouse: P. Lakshmikutty
- Children: 3

K. Sukumaranunni (11 April 1929 - 13 July 1984) was a teacher, service union activist, short story writer and politician from Kerala, India. He represented Sreekrishnapuram Assembly constituency in the 5th Kerala Legislative Assembly.

== Biography ==
K. Sukumaranunni was born on April 11, 1929, the son of Chinnammalu Vayankaramma. He died on July 13, 1984.

== Political career ==
As a member of Indian National Congress, Sukumaranunni served as the member of All India Congress Committee and Kerala Pradesh Congress Committee and treasurer of Palakkad District Congress Committee. While working as a teacher he held several positions including treasurer of All India Federation of Educational Associations, general secretary and state president of Kerala Aided Primary Teachers Union and state convener of Teachers Cell.

Sukumaranunni represented Sreekrishnapuram Assembly constituency in the 5th Kerala Legislative Assembly.

== Literary works ==
- Unnathi, Short Stories (1957)
- Rajan, Short Stories (1959)

== Legacy ==
In honor of him, who is also a teacher, the Sukumaranunni Educational Trust established Sukumaranunni Award. The award, which includes a cash prize of 10,001 Indian rupees, a memento and a citation, is given to the best teachers in the state.
