= Ottapalam railway station =

Railway station in kerala, India

Ottapalam
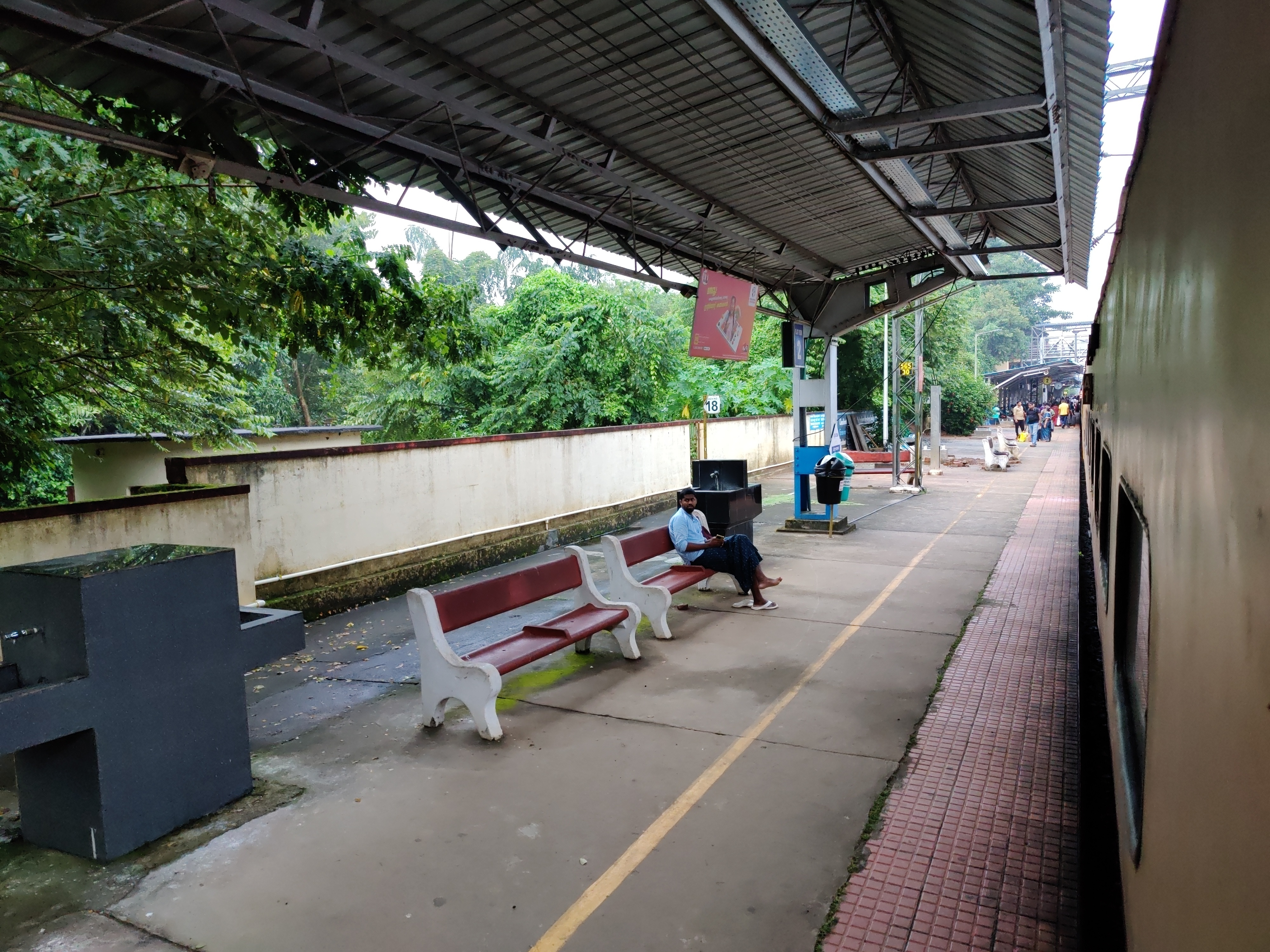
- Ottapalam railway station

General information
- Location: Railway Station Road, Ottapalam, Palakkad district, Kerala; India
- Coordinates: 10.76991°N 76.37765°E
- Elevation: 33 m (108 ft)
- System: Indian Railways station
- Owner: Indian Railways
- Operator: Southern Railway zone
- Line: Jolarpettai–Shoranur line
- Platforms: 2
- Tracks: 4

Construction
- Structure type: At–grade
- Parking: Available

Other information
- Status: Functioning
- Station code: OTP
- Zone(s): Southern Railway zone
- Division(s): Palakkad
- Fare zone: Indian Railways

History
- Opened: 1904; 122 years ago
Location
- Location within India Location within Kerala

Ottapalam (station code: OTP) is an NSG–3 category Indian railway station in Palakkad railway division of Southern Railway zone. It is a railway station in Ottapalam, Palakkad district, Kerala.

== History ==
Ottapalam station was opened in 1904.

The station received a makeover in early 2021 with several murals depicting the history, culture, and architecture of the region, as well as notable people from Ottapalam. The murals were created by artists Ambili Thekkedath and T.S. Sanu of Deva Creations. Among the people featured on the station's murals are C. Sankaran Nair, V. P. Menon, K.R. Narayanan, Chembai Vaidyanatha Bhagavathar, Mani Madhava Chakyar, P. Kunhiraman Nair and Kunchan Nambiar with his Killikurissimangalam house. There are also murals depicting Varikkaserri Mana, the old Ottapalam courthouse building, and major local festivals such as Chinakkathur Pooram, and art forms such as Kathakali and Ottamthullal. There is also a mural depicting the first conference of the Kerala Pradesh Congress Committee, which was held in Ottapalam in 1921.
