= K. Premkumar =

Indian politician

- കെ. പ്രേംകുമാർ

Member of the Kerala Legislative Assembly
- Incumbent
- Assumed office 24 May 2021
- Preceded by: P. Unni
- Constituency: Ottapalam

Personal details
- Born: Kerala, India
- Party: Communist Party of India (Marxist)

K. Premkumar is an Indian politician belonging to the Communist Party of India (Marxist). He is serving as the MLA of Ottappalam constituency since 24 May 2021.
