= E. Padmanabhan =

Indian politician (1934–1990)

Member of the Kerala Legislative Assembly
- In office 1982–1987
- Preceded by: K. Sankaranarayanan
- Succeeded by: P. Balan
- Constituency: Sreekrishnapuram

Personal details
- Born: 31 March 1934 Kozhikode, Malabar district, British India
- Died: 18 September 1990 (aged 56) Delhi, India
- Spouse: C. Rajamma
- Children: 4

E. Padmanabhan (31 March 1934 - 18 September 1990) was a politician from Kerala, India, who represented Sreekrishnapuram constituency in the 7th Kerala Legislative Assembly. One of the founding leaders and long term general secretary of the Kerala NGO Union, he was also known as NGO Padmanabhan.

== Biography ==
E. Padmanabhan was born on March 31, 1934, in Edappal in present-day Malappuram district as the second son of Ramanunni Nair. He studied till 10th class.

=== Personal life and death ===
Padmanabhan and his wife C. Rajamma have four children. He died of a heart attack on September 18, 1990, while attending an anti-communal convention in Delhi.

== Political career ==
=== Electoral politics ===
Padmanabhan represented Sreekrishnapuram Assembly constituency in 7th Kerala Legislative Assembly as a candidate of Communist Party of India (Marxist).

=== Service organization activism ===
Padmanabhan who was one of the founders of Kerala Non Gazetted Officers Union, served as the general secretary of the union from 1965 to 1982. He was also known as NGO Padmanabhan. He was also served as the general secretary of the FSETO (Federation of State Employees & Teachers' Organizations) from 1973 to 1982 and the zonal secretary of the AISGEF (All India State Government Employees Federation) in 1965. He led several strikes by government employees in Kerala. Padmanabhan was the founding president of the Kerala Water Authority Employees Union (CITU) also.
