= P. V. Kunhunni Nair =

Indian politician

P. V. Kunhunni Nair (September 1910 – 20 November 1986 ) was an Indian politician and leader of Communist Party of India. He represented Ottapalam constituency in 1st and 2nd Kerala Legislative Assembly.

He was imprisoned in 1931–1932 for participating in the Non-cooperation movement. He joined the Congress Socialist Party in 1935 and joined the CPI in 1939. He was lodged in the Vellore Central Jail during the Second World War.
