= V. C. Kabeer =

Indian politician

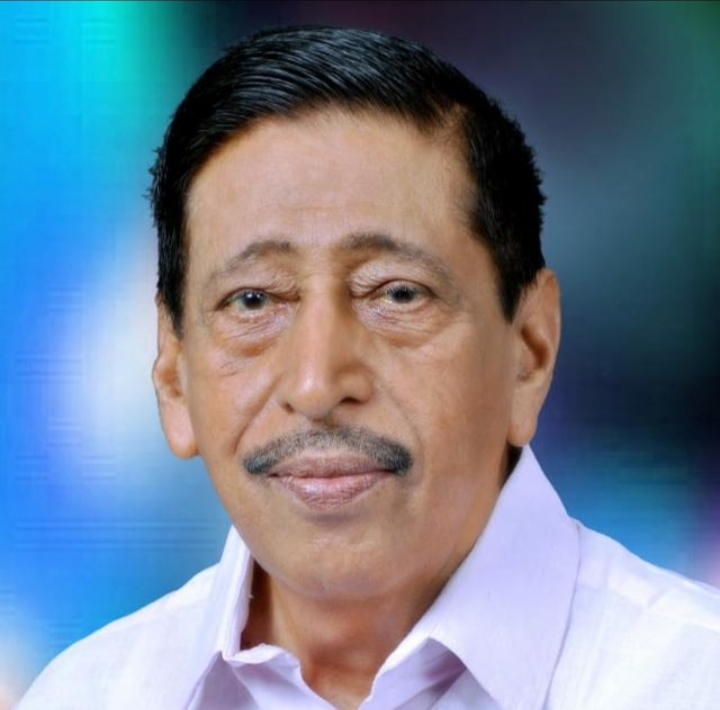

Minister for Health and Sports, Kerala
- In office 19 January 2000 – 13 May 2001
- Preceded by: A. C. Shanmughadas
- Succeeded by: P Sankaran

Member of Kerala Legislative Assembly
- In office 1991–2005
- Preceded by: K. Sankaranarayanan
- Succeeded by: M. Hamsa
- Constituency: Ottappalam
- In office 1980–1987
- Preceded by: P. Balan
- Succeeded by: K. Sankaranarayanan
- Constituency: Ottapalam

Personal details
- Born: 10 May 1943 (age 83) Palakkad district, Kerala, India
- Party: Indian National Congress (before 1980, 2005 - present)
- Other political affiliations: NCP (till 2005) Indian Congress (Socialist) Indian National Congress (U)
- Spouse: A. A. Beepathu
- Children: 2 sons, 1 daughter.

V. Cheku Kabeer is an Indian politician, Gandhian and current president of Gandhi Darshan Samithi. He served as a minister in Third Nayanar ministry from 2000-2001. He is a member of Kerala Legislative Assembly for several years representing Ottappalam constituency.

== Early life ==
V. C. Kabeer was born as the son of Shri. Cheku Haji and Smt. Sulekha Umma on 10 May 1943. A teacher by profession, he came to active politics through the students' wing of the Congress and Youth Congress. He had also been jailed for twenty days, in connection with the Vimochana Samaram.

== Political career ==
V. C. Kabeer became elected to the 6th Kerala Legislative Assembly, from Ottappalam constituency, as an INC(U) Member. He represented the same constituency subsequently as Congress(S) Member in the 7th, 9th and 10th Kerala Legislative Assembly. He continued to represent Ottappalam constituency in the 11th Kerala Legislative Assembly, as a Member of NCP. But he resigned his membership in the 11th Kerala Legislative Assembly on 11 August 2005 to rejoin Congress. In the Ministry headed by Shri. E. K. Nayanar, Shri V.C. Kabeer was the Minister for Health and Sports from 19 January 2000 to 13 May 2001. He contested in the subsequent Kerala Legislative Assembly election as an INC candidate from his long-term fortress Ottapalam constituency. However, he failed to gain the upper hand and eventually lost.

== Positions held ==
- President Gandhi Darshan Samithi
- Member KPCC
- Secretary, District Youth Congress (1964–68)
- President, District Youth Congress Committee (1970–78)
- Secretary, Palakkad DCC (1977–80)
- President, DCC (S) (1982–92)
- Secretary KPCC(S) (1992-2000)

== See also ==
- A. C. Shanmughadas
- A. K. Saseendran
- A. A. Rahim
