= Third Nayanar ministry =

Government of Kerala, India (1996–2001)

Third Nayanar Ministry
- 17th Cabinet of Kerala
- 1996-2001
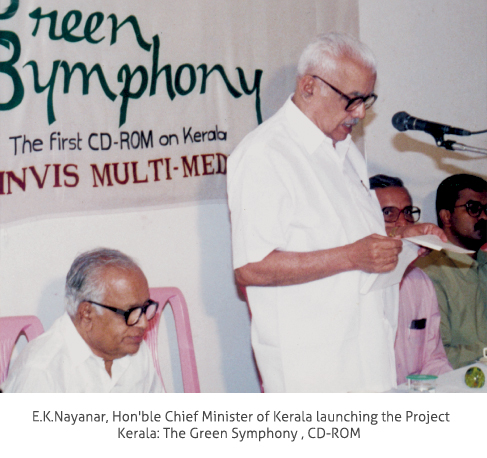
- Date formed: 20 May 1996
- Date dissolved: 13 May 2001

People and organisations
- Head of government: E. K. Nayanar
- Member parties: LDF
- Status in legislature: Majority
- Opposition party: UDF
- Opposition leader: A. K. Antony

History
- Election: 1996
- Predecessor: Second Antony ministry
- Successor: Third Antony ministry

The Tenth Kerala Legislative Assembly Council of Ministers, third E. K. Nayanar ministry, was a Kerala Council of Ministers (Kerala Cabinet), the executive wing of Kerala state government, led by CPI (M) leader E. K. Nayanar from May 1996 to May 2001. It had sixteen ministries and overall twenty ministers.

The Kerala Council of Ministers, during Nayanar's third term as Chief Minister of Kerala, consisted of:

== Ministers ==
	Minister	Ministry	Notes
1	E. K. Nayanar	Chief Minister (Also had the charge of Home Department)	
2	T. Sivadasa Menon	Minister for Finance	
3a	Pinarayi Vijayan	Minister for Electricity and Co-operation	resigned 19 October 1998
3b	S. Sharma	Minister for Electricity and Co-operation	assumed office 25 October 1998
4a	Baby John	Minister for Irrigation and Labour	resigned 7 January 1998
4b	V. P. Ramakrishna Pillai	Minister for Irrigation and Labour	assumed office 7 January 1998
5	E. Chandrasekharan Nair	Minister for Food, Tourism, and Law	
6a	A. C. Shanmughadas	Minister for Health and Sports	resigned 19 January 2000
6b	V.C Kabeer	Minister for Health and Sports	assumed office 19 January 2000
7	K. Radhakrishnan	Minister for Welfare of Backward and Scheduled communities	
8a	V. K. Rajan	Minister for Agriculture	died in office 29 May 1997
8b	Krishnan Kaniyamparampil	Minister for Agriculture	assumed office 9 June 1997
9	T. K. Ramakrishnan	Minister for Fisheries and Rural Development	
10a	P. R. Kurup	Minister for Forests and Transport	resigned 11 January 1999
10b	A. Neelalohitha Dasan Nadar	Minister for Forests and Transport	assumed office 20 January 1999 resigned 13 February 2000
10c	C. K. Nanu	Minister for Forests and Transport	assumed office 13 February 2000
11	K. E. Ismail	Minister for Revenue	
12	P. J. Joseph	Minister for Education and Public Works	
13	Paloli Muhammed Kutty	Minister for Local Administration	
14	Susheela Gopalan	Minister for Industries and Social Welfare	

== Trivia ==
This was the third and last term of E. K. Nayanar as the Chief Minister, and the only one in which he completed a full term as chief minister. He did not contest in the 1996 Legislative elections, and V. S. Achuthanandan, another senior Communist leader, was designated as the Chief Minister candidate. When the election results came, the Left Democratic Front won the majority of seats, but Achuthanandan lost. In this special situation, a meeting was held by the CPI (M), which unanimously supported Nayanar as the Chief Minister. When Nayanar left the office after completing his term in May 2001, he had become the longest served Chief Minister of Kerala, serving for 4009 days in total.

== See also ==
- Chief Ministers of Kerala
- Kerala Ministers
