= Palappuram =

- Neighbourhood
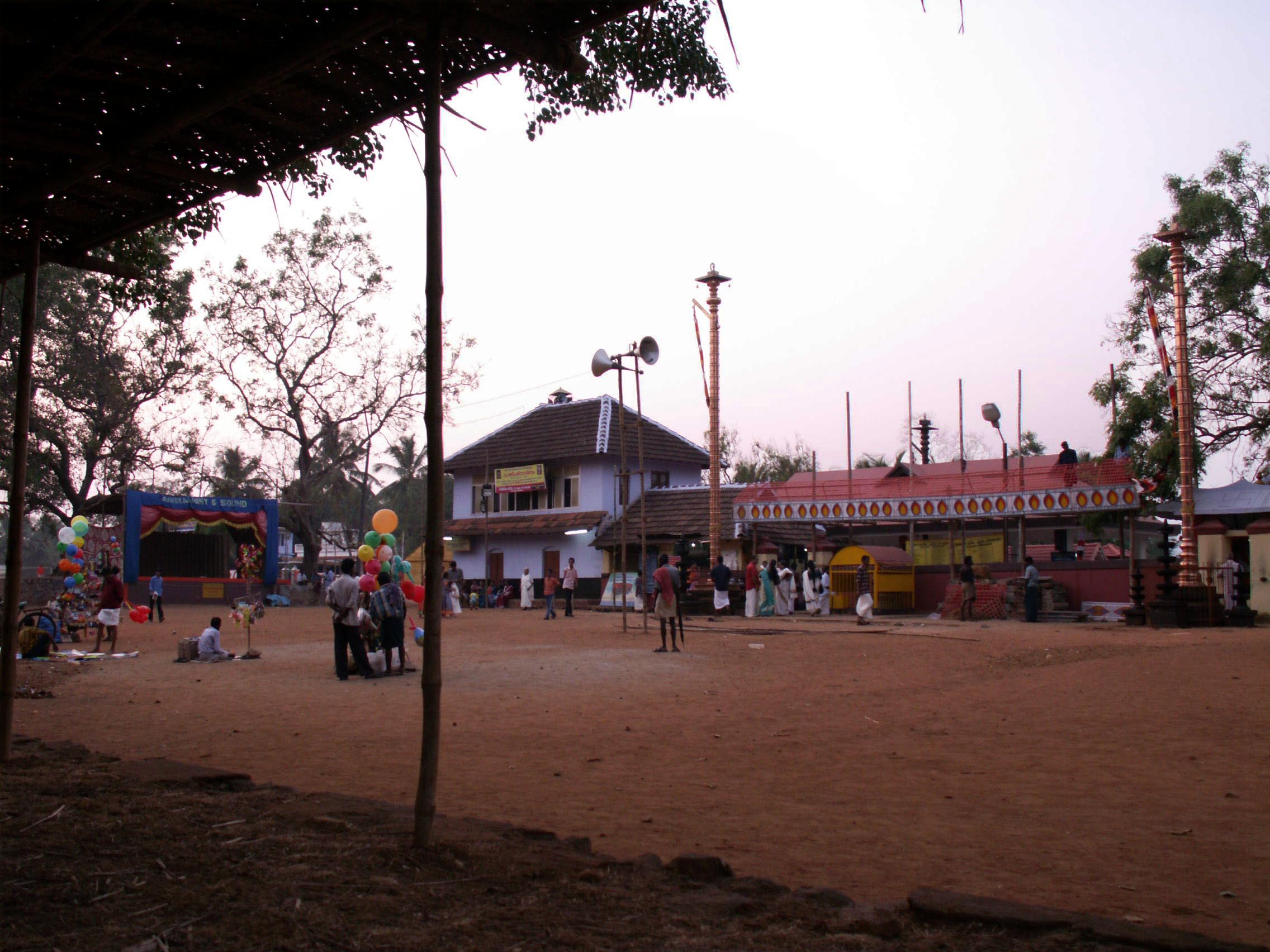
- Chinakkathur temple a few days before the festival
- Interactive map of Palappuram
- Coordinates: 10.7851°N 76.2359°E
- Country: India
- State: Kerala
- District: Palakkad

Government
  - Body: Ottapalam municipality

Languages
  - Official: Malayalam, English
- Time zone: UTC+5:30 (IST)
- PIN: 679103
- Vehicle registration: KL-51

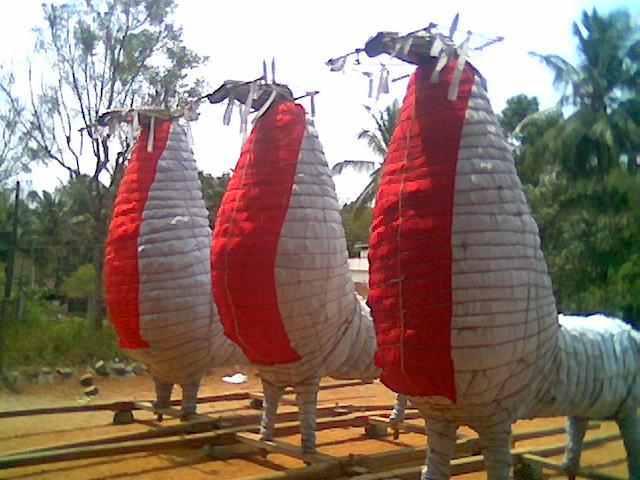
Kuthira (Horses) used in the Chinakkattur Pooram

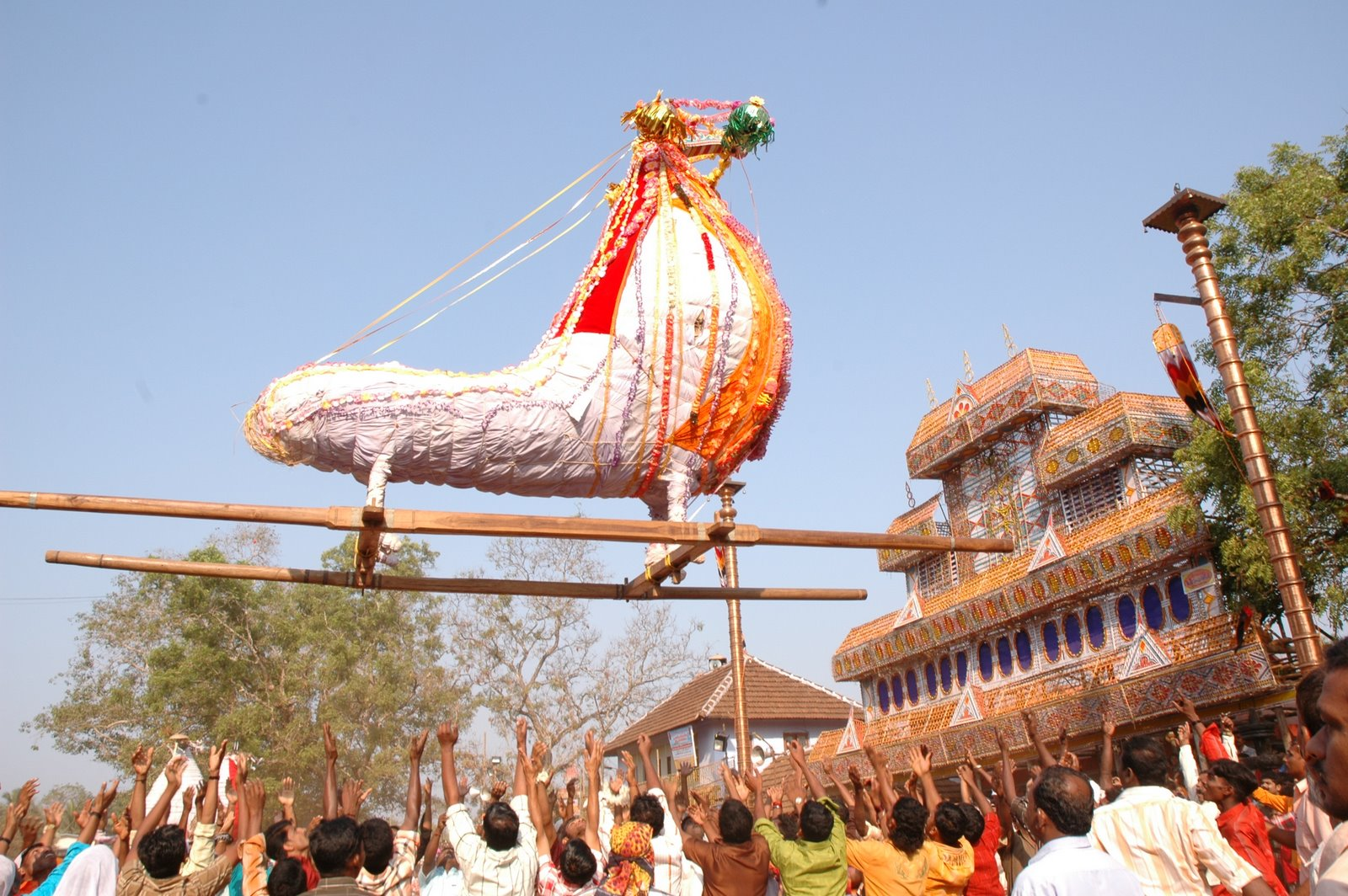
Chinakkathur pooram Kudhira kali

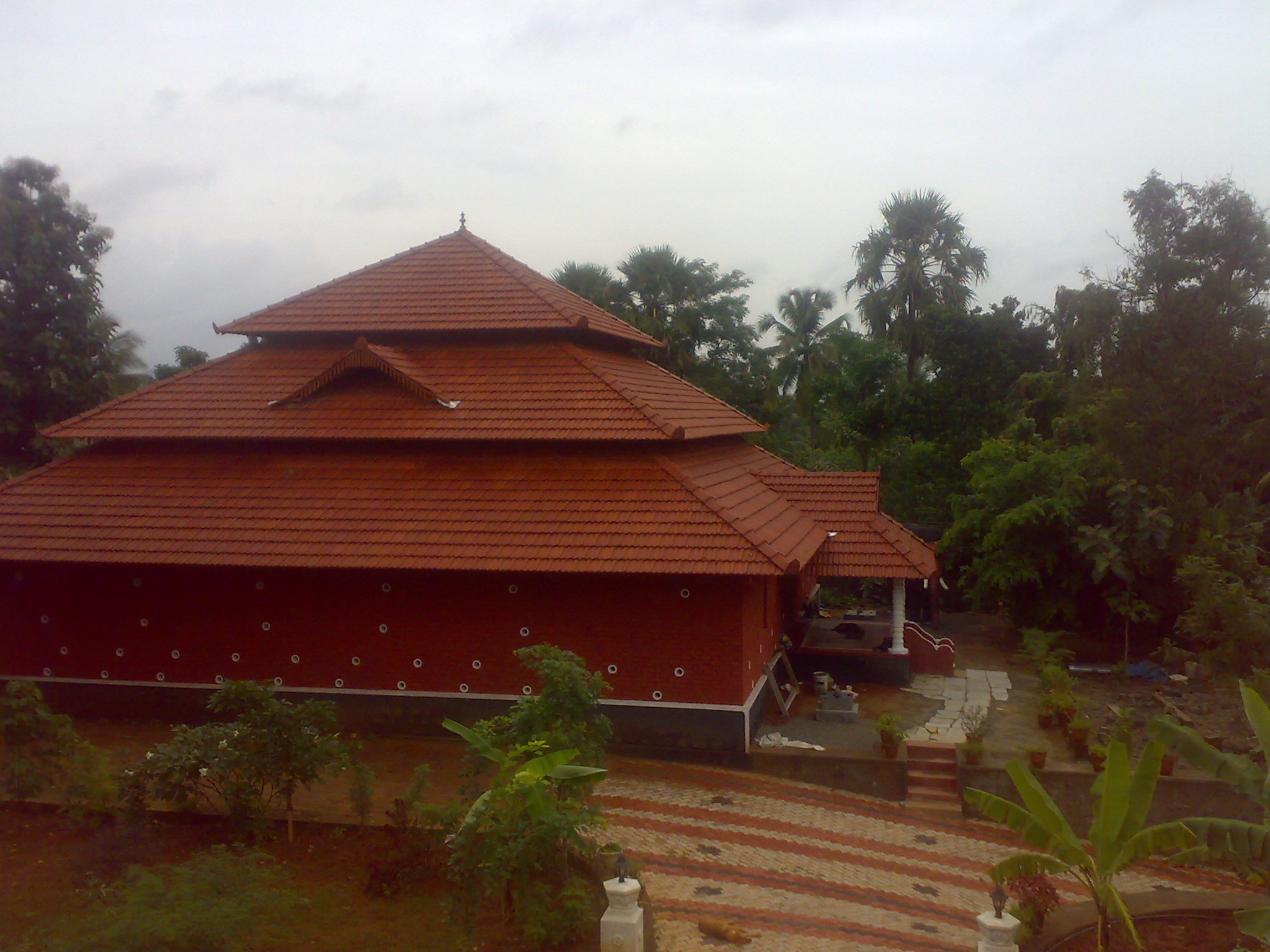
Trigarbha Kudi In PAHRC

Palappuram is a neighbourhood in Ottapalam located 4 km from Ottapalam, between Shornur and the Palakkad Highway in Kerala, South India. In olden days most of them were farmers and weavers. There are various temple in this village. Chinakkathur Kavu, Mariyamman temple, NeeliKavu, and Sree Kurumba kavu.

== Temples ==
Palappuram is noted for the famous Chinakkathur Temple festival (known as Chinakkathur pooram) held every year during March/April.

== History ==
Palappuram is a part of old Nedunga nadukingdom. Place is famous for the Chinakkathoor Pooram (annual Hindu festival) held at the famous Chinakkattoorkkavu Temple of Goddess Durga. There is a huge local and global crowd who come here to see the Pooram festival. The pooram is accompanied by Elephants and the traditional Melam. Huge man made Horses (Kuthira) made out of straw, paper and cloth are the special attraction of this festival. It is unique in the sense that nowhere else Poorams has these Horses.

== Places of worship ==
Palappuram has a famous Mariamman Temple of Goddess. There is a huge local and other state crowd comes here to perceive the Mariamman Festival which would happen once in 4 years. The people of Palappuram would celebrate this festival for one week. Each day has a unique pooja and programs and the last day is "majnaneerattu". People from different part of Kerala and Tamil Nadu would participate in this festival.

Palappuram has its post office situated near the NSS College Bus stop. Other notable institutions include the GJBS School, Padnharrakara Aided Junior Basic School (AJB School located at the 19th mile bus stop), Mariyamman temple, St. Mary's Church, Mosques, Someswaram Siva Temple, Dakshinamoorthy Temple etc. The Someswaram temple is believed to be the one among the 108 Shiva temples established by Parasurama, the mythological character. The place is located in the banks of Bharathapuzha. Ottapalam is the major town nearby. Palappuram has a surviving traditional weaving industry.

== Education ==
It is also famous for its educational institutions like the NSS College, a Kendriya Vidyalaya (Central School) and a Steel foundry unit run by Steel Industries Limited Kerala (SILK) at Kairampara junction. Palappuram has been famous for some time for Ayurveda Medical treatment. The staff residence quarter's for the government Postal department and BSNL, the government-run telecom company, are also located here.

The country's first defence park was declared to be established at the KINFRA Industrial park at Palappuram - Ottapalam.

=== Schools ===
- Kendriya Vidyalaya
- Government Junior Basic School
- Aided Junior Basic School
- Lakshmi Narayana Vidyaniketan
- Padinharkkara Junior Basic School

=== Colleges ===
- N.S.S. College, Palappuram.
- N.S.S. Training College, Palappuram.
- Lakshmi Narayana College.

== Hospitals ==
Padinharkkara Ayurveda Hospital And Research Center(P.A.H.R.C.),

ESI Hospital Palappuram

Government Homoeo Dispensary Ottappalam under Department of Homeopathy of Govt of Kerala(located at Meetna),one of the pioneer homoeo health care service provider of Palakkad district.A senior doctor (CMO) available for consultation.

== Transportation ==
Palappuram town connects to other parts of India through Palakkad city. National Highway No.544 connects to Coimbatore and Bangalore. Other parts of Kerala is accessed through National Highway No.66 going through Thrissur.

Calicut International Airport, Cochin International Airport and Coimbatore Airport are the nearest airports.

Shoranur Junction railway station is the nearest major railway station.
