= M. Hamsa =

Indian politician

Member of Kerala Legislative Assembly
- In office 2006–2016
- Preceded by: V.C Kabeer
- Succeeded by: P. Unni
- Constituency: Ottappalam

Personal details
- Born: 27 June 1961 (age 64) Thozhuppadam, Chelakkara
- Party: Communist Party of India (Marxist)
- Spouse: P.B Shamlabi
- Children: two children

M. Hamsa was a member of 13th Kerala Legislative Assembly. He belongs to Communist Party of India (Marxist) and represents Ottappalam constituency.

== Positions held ==
- Recipient of K.P.S. Menon Award for the best student of N.S.S.K.P.T.H.S. for the year 1979
- President, S.F.I. Palakkad District Committee and D.Y.F.I. Block Committee, Ottappalam
- Member, State Committee, S.F.I., Ottappalam Grama Panchayath and Municipality Advisory Committee
- Branch Secretary, Local Secretary and Area Committee Secretary (16 years), C.P.I.(M)
- Director, Ottappalam S.C.B.
- Chairman, Ottappalam Urban Co-operative Bank for 11 years
- State President of Asianet Satellite Communication Employees Union (C.I.T.U.) (present)
- District Joint Secretary, C.I.T.U (present)
- Vice-President, State Committee, Government Press Workers Union (C.I.T.U.) (present)

== Personal life ==
He was born on 27 June 1961 at Thozhuppadam, Chelakkara. He is the son of M. Usman and C. Fathima. He is married to P.B Shamlabi and has two children. He lives in Ottappalam, Palakkad.
