= C. Govinda Panicker =

Indian politician

Member of the Kerala Legislative Assembly
- In office 1965–1977
- Succeeded by: K. Sukumaranunni
- Constituency: Sreekrishnapuram

Personal details
- Born: 1928 Malabar, British India (present-day Northern Palakkad)
- Died: 9 May 2004 (aged 75–76) Palakkad, Kerala
- Spouse: K. P. Parukutty Pisharassiar
- Children: 1

C. Govinda Panicker (1928 - 9 May 2004) also known as C. G. Panicker was a politician from Kerala, India, who represented Sreekrishnapuram Assembly constituency in the 3rd and 4th Kerala Legislative Assembly as a candidate of Communist Party of India (Marxist). Panicker has won the first three elections since the formation of the Srikrishnapuram constituency in 1965. He was elected to the Kerala Assembly in 1965, 1967 and 1971 elections.

== Biography ==
C. Govinda Panicker was born on 1928 in a Malabar Nair family. His wife is from Ambalavasi community, K. P. Parukutty Pisharassiar, they have one daughter. He died on May 9, 2004, at Palakkad, Kerala.

== Political career ==
Govinda Panicker who was an active member of Indian independence movement, joined Indian National Congress party in 1949. He left Congress party in 1952 and joined the Communist Party of India, and after the split of Communist Party of India in 1964, He became member of Communist Party of India (Marxist). When the Communist Marxist Party (CMP) was formed in 1986, he left the CPI (M) and joined the CMP, where he served as the party's Palakkad district secretary. Panicker, who served as the secretary of Palghat District Karshaka Sanghom (agricultural workers' union), was active in organizing agricultural workers in the district.

=== Electoral politics ===
Govinda Panicker represented Sreekrishnapuram Assembly constituency in 3rd and 4th Kerala Legislative Assembly as a candidate of Communist Party of India (Marxist).
