= Ambalappara =

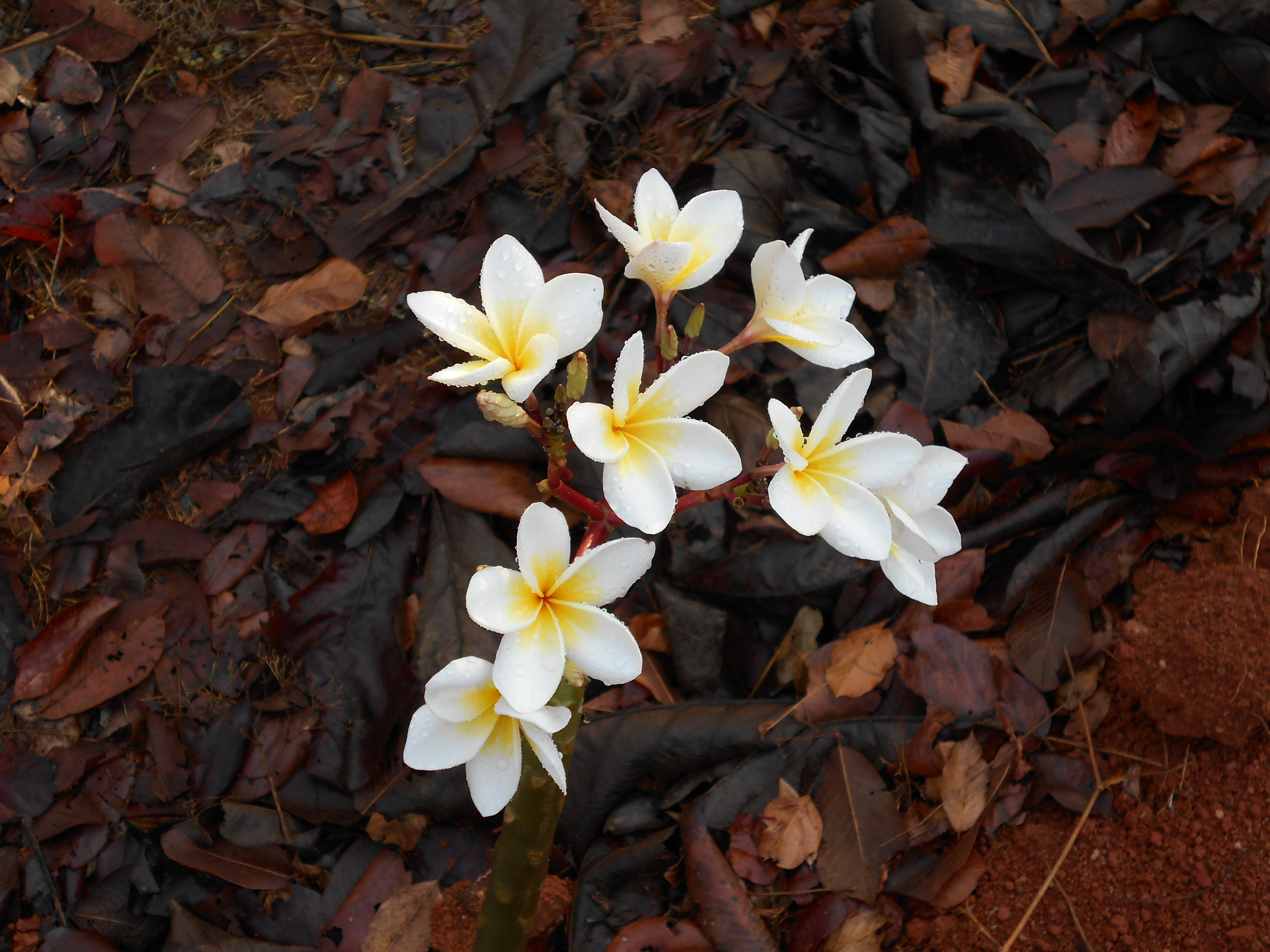
- Interactive map of Ambalappara
- Coordinates: 10.82993°N 76.41060°E
- Country: India
- State: Kerala
- District: Palakkad
- Time zone: UTC+5:25 (IST)
- PIN: 679512

Ambalapara is a gram panchayat in the Palakkad district, state of Kerala, India. It is the local government organisation that serves the villages of Ambalapara-I and Ambalapara-II and forms a part of the Ottapalam taluk.

== Demographics ==
As of 2011 Indian census, Ambalappara has a population of 38,276 people. According to bureaucratic niceties, Ambalapara-I has 13,387 people and Ambalapara-II has 24,889 people.

== Post office ==
Ambalappara has a post office, and the pin-code is 679512.
