= Lakkidi-Perur-I =

- village
- Country: India
- State: Kerala
- District: Palakkad

Government
  - Type: local self government

Population (2011)
  - Total: 13,358

Languages
  - Official: Malayalam, English
- Time zone: UTC+5:30 (IST)
- PIN: 679301
- Vehicle registration: KL-

Lakkidi-Perur-I is a village in Palakkad district in the state of Kerala, India.

== Demographics ==
As of 2011 India census, Lakkidi-Perur-I had a population of 13,358 with 6,433 males and 6,925 females.
