= Kadampazhipuram =

Town in Palakkad district of Kerala, India

Kadampazhipuram is a town within the Ottappalam Tehsil of Palakkad district in the state of Kerala, India. Kadampazhipuram is a gram panchayat in Palakkad district, state of Kerala, India. It is a local government organisation that serves the villages of Kadampazhipuram-I and Kadampazhipuram-II. Kadampazhipuram is a village in Sreekrishnapuram Block in Palakkad district of Kerala State, India. It belongs to Central Kerala Division . It is located 27 KM towards west from district headquarters Palakkad. 6 KM from Sreekrishnapuram, 350 KM from state capital Thiruvanthapuram, Government Engineering College Sreekrishnapuram, Palakkad 4 km away from the Kadampazhipuram on the Kadampazhipuram-Sreekrishnapuram road. Government Engineering College, Sreekrishnapuram, Sreekrishnapuram VT Bhattathiripad College ( 2 KM ), Sreekrishnapuram VT Bhattathiripad College, Sreekrishnapuram Central School ( 1 KM ), Government Upper Primary School Kadampazhipuram , Kadampazhipuram High School, MNKMGHSS Pulapata ( 8 KM ) are the major institution nearby. Kadampazhipuram PIN code is 678633 and postal head office is Kadambazhipuram .

Karimpuzha ( 7 KM ), Ambalapara ( 7 KM ), Karakurissi ( 8 KM ), Kongad-I ( 8 KM ), Ottapalam ( 18 KM ) and Mannarkad ( 22 KM ) are the nearby villages to Kadampazhipuram. Kadampazhipuram is surrounded by Sreekrishnapuram Block, Ottappalam Block, Mannarkad Block.

Ottappalam, Shoranur, Palakkad, Perinthalmanna are the nearby cities to Kadampazhipuram. The place is on the State Highway 53 (Kerala), Palakkad - Cherpulassery road.

== Demographics ==
As of 2011 India census, Kadampazhipuram-I had a population of 16,003 with 7,752 males and 8,251 females, and Kadampazhipuram-II had a population of 15,363, with 7,453 males and 7,910 females.

Landmarks

MNKMGHSS high school Pulappatta

SREE VAAYILLAKKUNNILAPPAN TEMPLE High school Katampazhipuram
