= Pooram =

Annual Hindu festival in Kerala, India

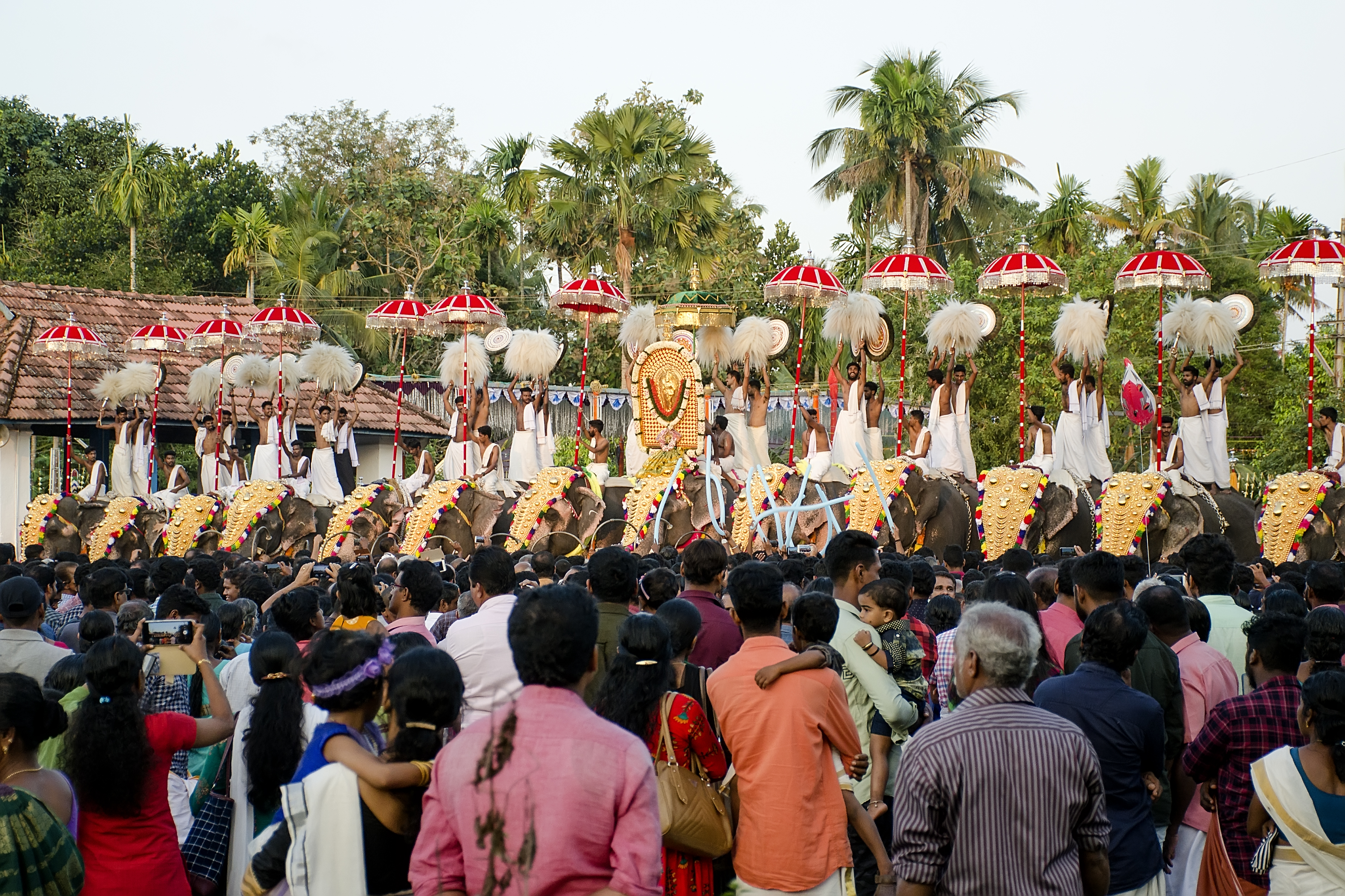
- Caparisoned elephants during Kuzhur Sree Subramanya Swami Temple festival
- Official name: Pooram (Malayalam)
- Observed by: Keralites
- Type: Temple Festival
- Observances: Melam, Elephant Show, Kuthira Vela, Kala Vela, Folk Arts, Shadow Puppetry, Fireworks
- Date: Summer

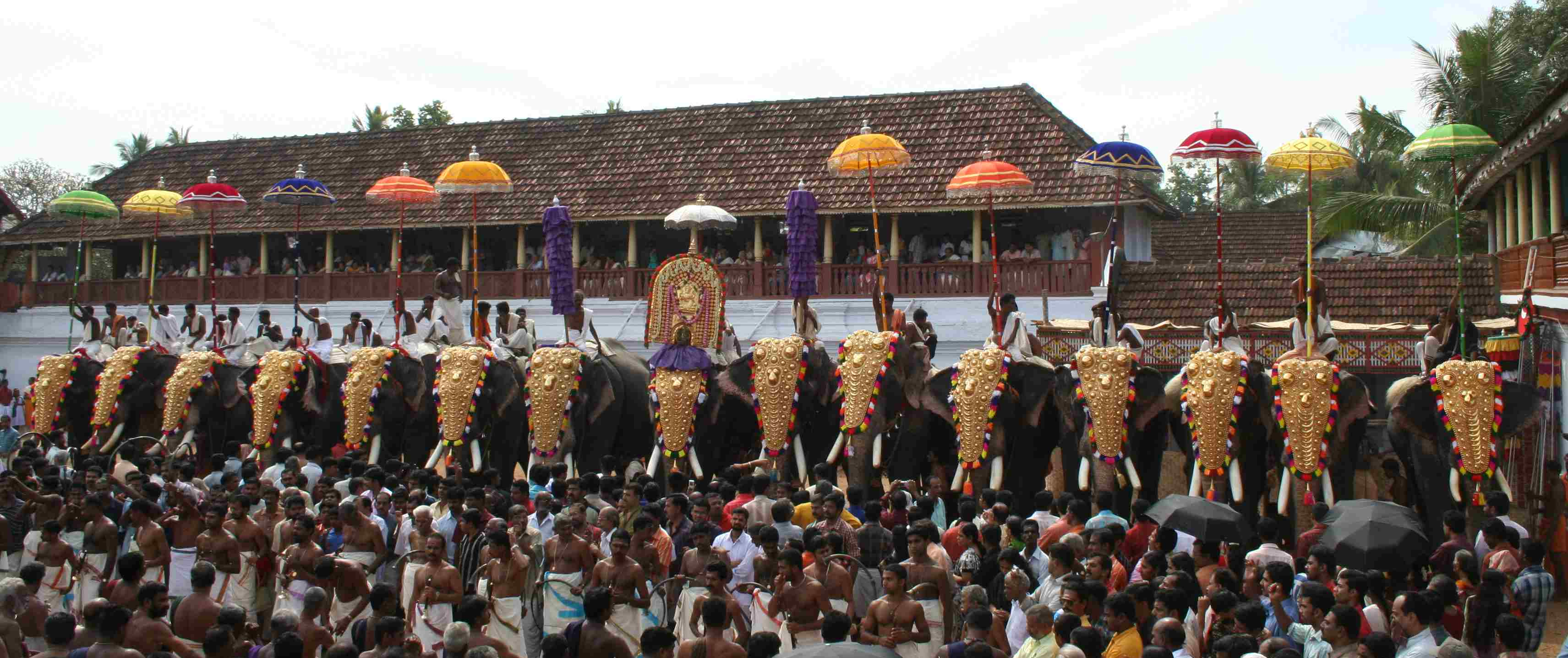
Caparisoned elephants during Sree Poornathrayesa temple festival, Thrippunithura.

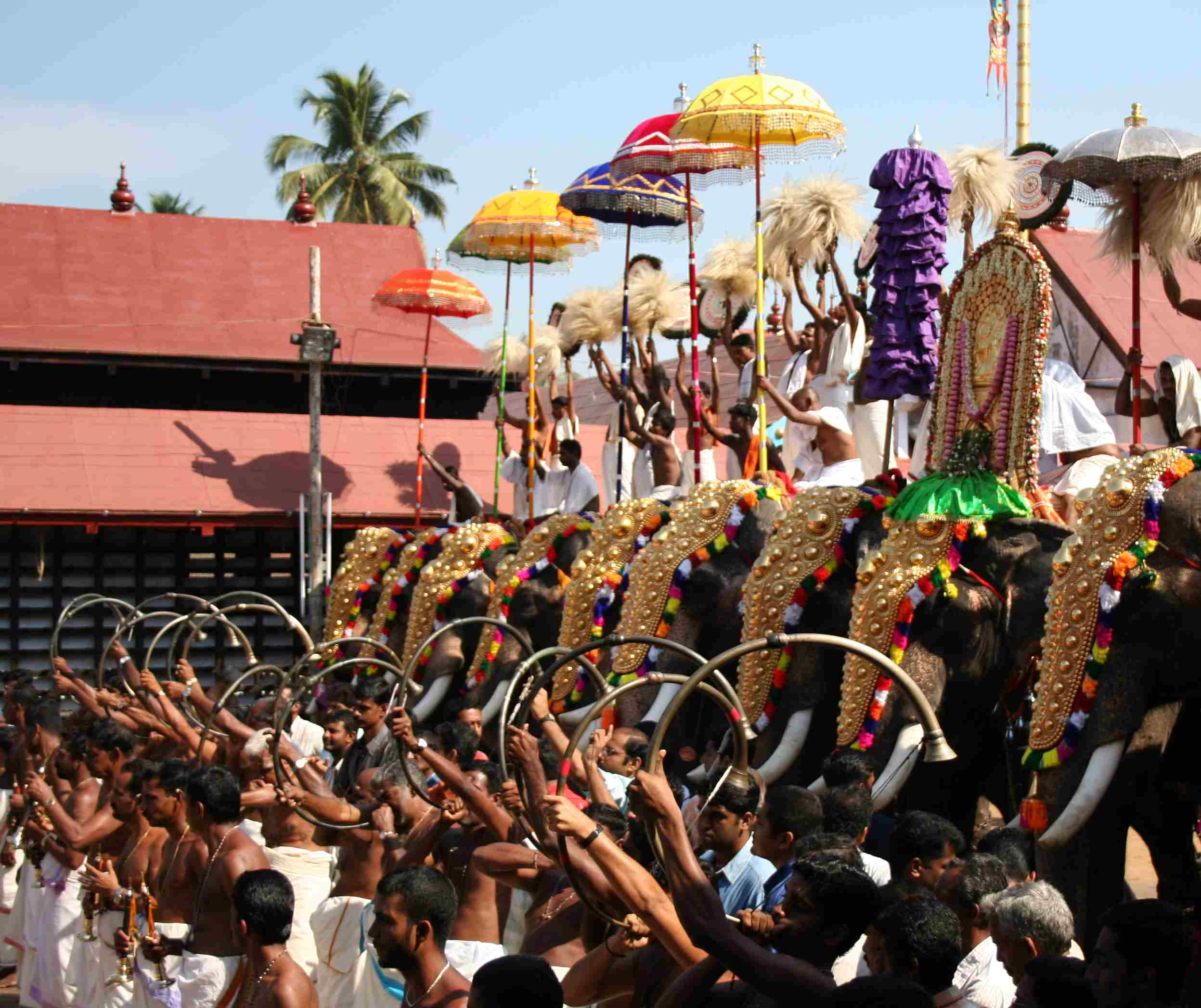
Caparisoned elephants and Panchavadyam performance during Sree Poornathrayesa temple festival, Thrippunithura.

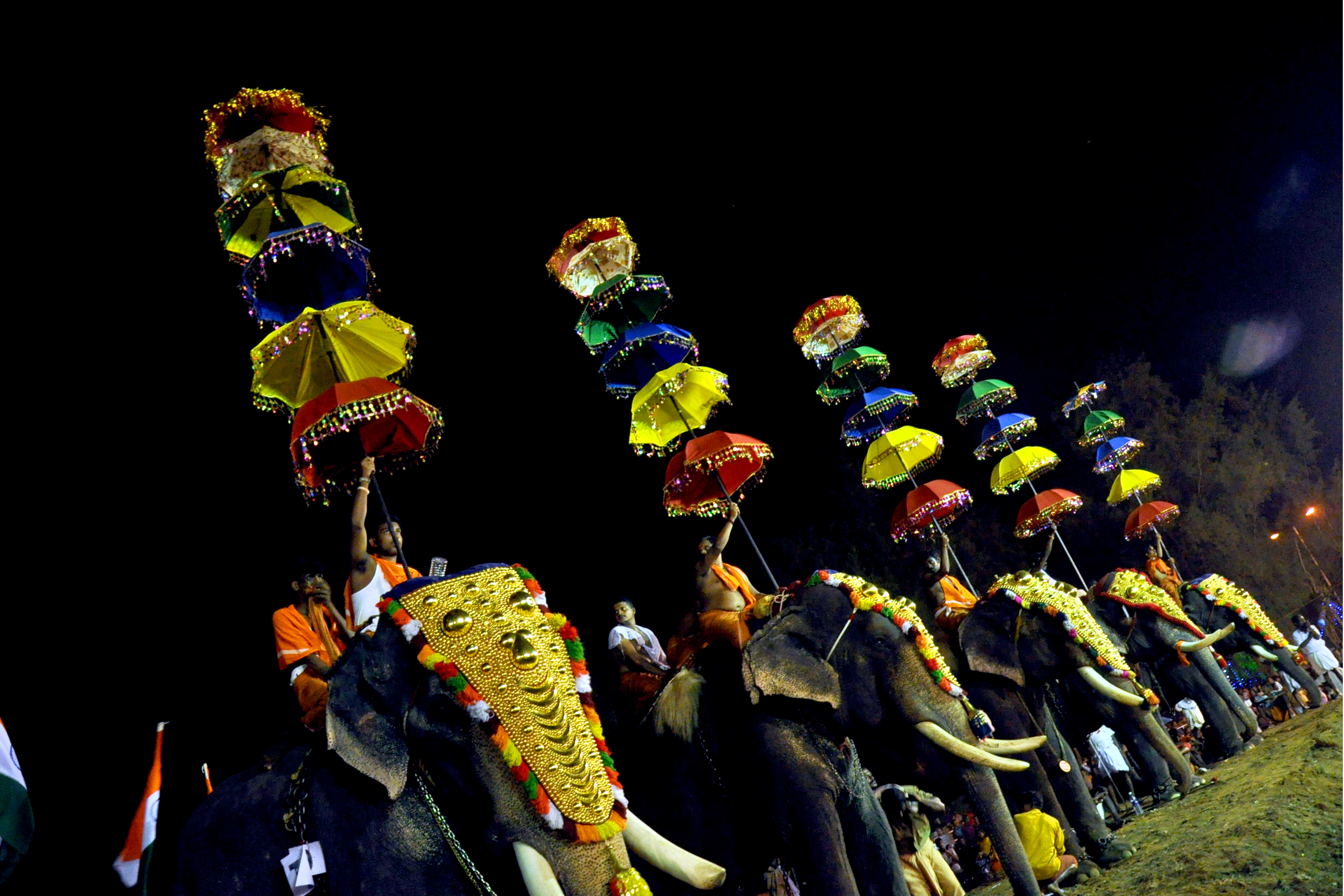
Kollam Pooram conducted at Asramam Maidan, Kollam as part of the temple festival at Asramam Sree Krishna Swami Temple. The festival is conducted on the next day of vishu every year

Pooram pronounced [puːɾam] is an annual festival, which is celebrated in temples dedicated to goddesses Durga or Kali, held especially in the old Valluvanad area, and to a lesser extent in other places, covering Kerala State's present-day Palakkad, Thrissur and Malappuram districts) as also Kollam district, after the summer harvest. Harimattom pooram is one of the famous pooram in Ernakulam. An example of a famous pooram is Thirumandhamkunnu Pooram which has an active participation of 11 Lakh people across the country. Most pooram festivals have at least one ornately decorated elephant being paraded in the procession taken out of the temple precincts. However, there are some well known poorams, such as Anthimahakalankavu Vela, Chelakkara, Aryankavu Pooram at shoranur Palakkad and Machad mamangam near Wadakkanchery that do not use the caparisoned elephant, instead go for stilted mannequins of horses or bullocks. Vela is also a festival like pooram. Thrissur Pooram is the most famous of all poorams, known for fire works. Kavassery pooram is well known for fireworks during afternoon. Some other well-known pooram festivals are Arattupuzha-Peruvanam Pooram, Chalissery Pooram is well known for the art and cultural standards, Anthimahakalankavu Vela, Nenmara Vallangi Vela, Vairankode Vela, Chinakathoor pooram, Mannarkkad Pooram, Kavassery Pooram, Pariyanampatta Pooram, Harimattom Pooram and Thirumandhamkunnu Pooram. Peruvanam-Arattupuza pooram is celebrating its 1436th year in 2018.

== Musical ensembles ==
A melam is a classical performance of different kind of musical instruments that are unique to Kerala and is something akin to the jazz. The most traditional of all melams is called Pandi Melam which is generally performed outside the temple, during the festival. Another kind of melam is called Panchari Melam, which is similar to Pandi Melam going by the kind of instruments, but played inside the temple and following a different rhythmic beat.

Panchavadyam (pancha in Sanskrit means five) is another classical musical ensemble performed in Kerala. Here, five different kinds of instruments create a breathtaking and fastmoving percussion performance. The five instruments are Madhalam, Kombu, Edakka, Elathalam and Timila.

Thayambaka is a type of solo chenda performance that developed in the south Indian state of Kerala, in which the main player at the centre improvises rhythmically on the beats of half-a-dozen or a few more chenda and ilathalam players around.

== Other attractions ==
Interesting attractions of Pooram can be seen in the Valluvanad and Talappilly region. There is the Harijan Vela or Parayar Vela as well as the Tholpavakoothu, a traditional shadow puppetry show. Harimattom Temple is situated near Tripunithura. just 7 km from there. The temple festival is started on Malayalam month Medam star UTTRAM. The main highlight of the festival is harimattom pooram which is on the 7th day of the festival. The main attraction of this pooram is kudamattam and famous pandimellam with the presence of most of the famous 10 elephants from Kerala. One of the most important things is the Harimattom pooram and festival is conducting as per keeping the Kerala tradition, beliefs and culture.

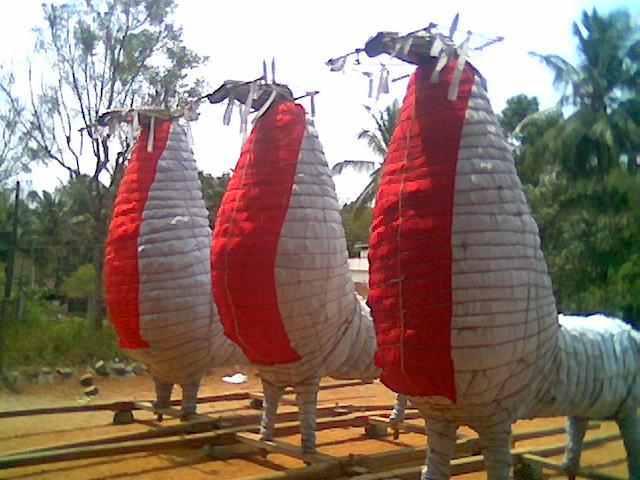
Ottapalam Pooram

== See also ==
- Nenmara Vallangi Vela Palakkad
- Thrissur Pooram
- Pariyanampatta Pooram
- Kollam Pooram
- Thirumandhamkunnu Pooram
- Uthralikavu Pooram
- Machad Mamangam
- Chinakkathoor Pooram
- Bhajanamadom pooram
- Kavassery pooram
- Arattupuzha Pooram
- Peruvanam Pooram
- Chinakkathoor Pooram
- vairankode vela
