= Thrikkadeeri-I =

Thrikkadeeri-Il
- Village
- Country: India
- State: Kerala
- District: Palakkad

Population (2011)
  - Total: 15,357

Languages
  - Official: Malayalam, English
- Time zone: UTC+5:30 (IST)
- PIN: 679503
- Vehicle registration: KL 51-

Thrikkadeeri -Il is a village in Palakkad district in the state of Kerala, India.

== Demographics ==
As of 2011 India census, Thrikkadeeri -I had a population of 15357 with 7349 males and 8008 females.
