= P. K. Sasi =

Indian politician

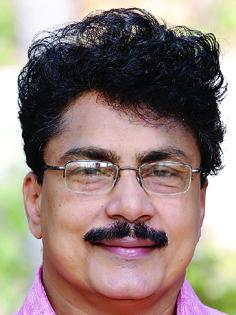

Member of Legislative Assembly, Kerala
- Constituency: Shornur

Personal details
- Party: Communist Marxist Party

P. K. Sasi (പി കെ ശശി) is an Indian politician former member of Communist Party of India (Marxist) and the former MLA of Shornur, Kerala.

Currently he serving as the chairman of KTDC (Kerala Tourism Development Corporation Limited) under the Department of Tourism as CPIM nominee.

P. K. Sasi, was the Secretariat member of CPIM Palakkad District Committee and President of CITU Palakkad District committee.

In 2018, a DYFI woman leader accused Sasi of sexual abuse. He was subsequently suspended from the party for six months.

On 18 August 2024, CPI(M) state leadership removed him from all elected posts of the party and was restricted as a party member.
