= Ottapalam =

- Town
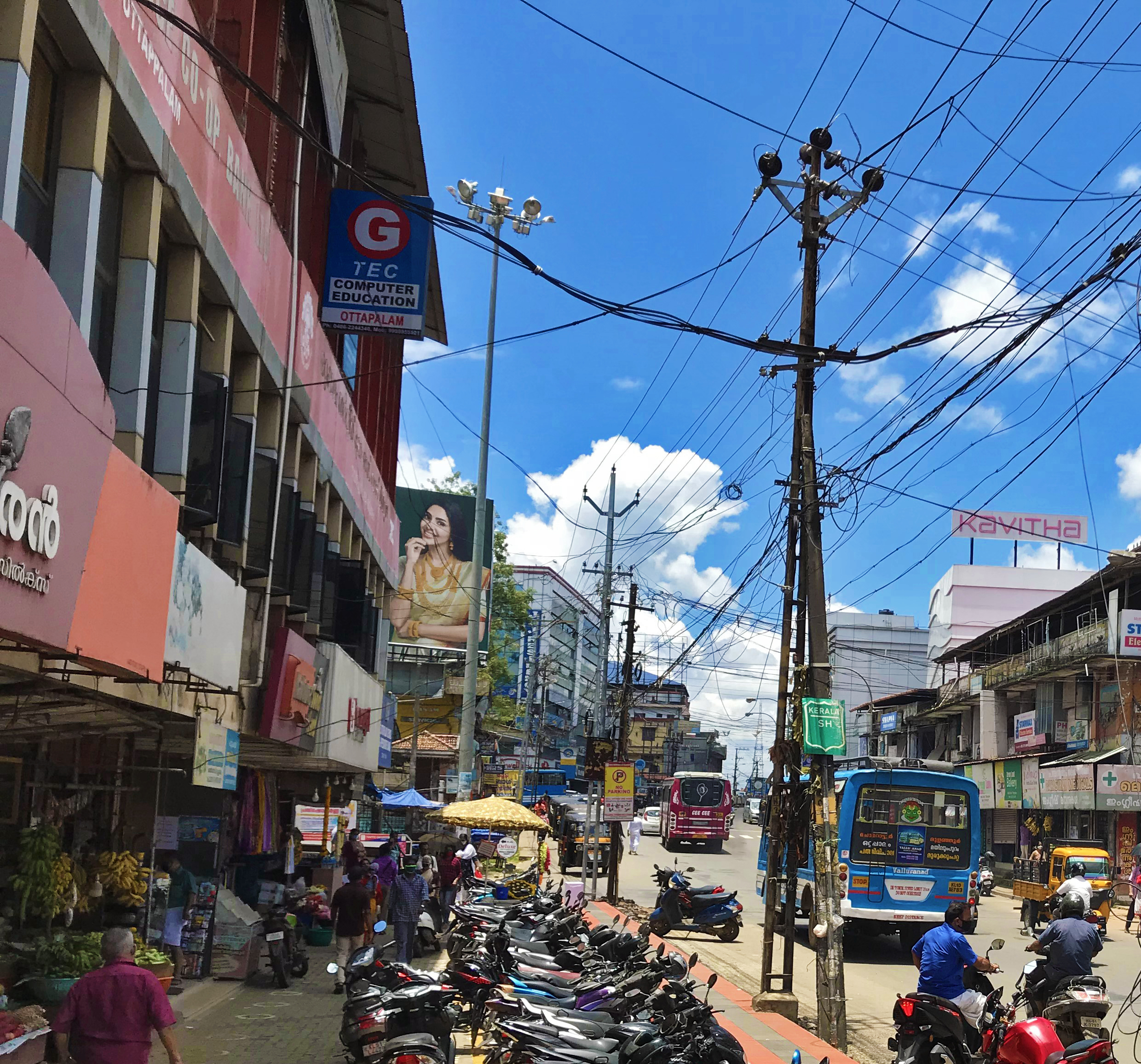
- Ottapalam bus stand

- Location in Kerala, India
- Coordinates: 10°46′N 76°23′E
- Country: India
- State: Kerala
- District: Palakkad
- Assembly constituency: Ottapalam

Government
  - Body: Municipality
  - MLA: Adv. K. Premkumar
  - Chairperson: K Janaki Devi

Area
  - Total: 32.7 km^{2} (12.6 sq mi)
- Elevation: 54 m (177 ft)

Population (2011)
  - Total: 53,790
  - Rank: 2nd in Palakkad district
  - Density: 1,640/km^{2} (4,260/sq mi)

Languages
  - Official: Malayalam
- Time zone: UTC+5:30 (IST)
- PIN code: 679 101-679 104
- Telephone code: 0466
- Vehicle registration: KL-51
- Sex ratio: 1000:1121 ♂/♀
- Literacy Rate: 91%
- Website: www.ottapalammunicipality.lsgkerala.gov.in

Ottapalam (also spelled Ottappalam) is a town, taluk, and municipality in the Palakkad District of Kerala, India. It is the administrative headquarters of Ottapalam taluk and is located approximately 34 km (21 mi) from the Palakkad (district HQ), along the banks of the Bharathapuzha River, the second-longest river in the state.

It is one of the major commercial centres in the district. It is also one of the major filming locations in Kerala, including the 2010 feature film Pokkiri Raja.

== History ==
The area was formerly known as Ayirur Thekkummuri Desam. The present-day Ottapalam, Pattambi and Cherpulassery areas were part of the medieval Nedunganad kingdom. Nedunganathiripad (Nedungadi) was the main ruler of Nedunganad. The headquarters was at Makovilakam near Kodikunnu, Chembulangad. Nedunaganad was ruled by the Nairs of Kavalappara, Thrikkadeeri, Kannambra, Vattakkavil Perumbada under the leadership of Nedunganathiripad. Ottappalam was the administrative area of Thrikkadeeri Nair. Its north side starts at Ayirur-Vadakkummuri near Mannarkkad and ends at Ayirur-Thekkummuri. After passing Ayirur-Thekkummuri, crossing the 'Ottapalam of Kanniyampuram river', then it comes the place to pay a toll for Kavalappara Nair.

Around 1487 AD, the region was annexed to the kingdom of the Zamorin of Calicut. The Zamorin appointed his chieftain at Kavalappara Kovilakam. After the long rule of the Zamorin of Calicut, it became a part of the Kingdom of Mysore around 1766. It came under the rule of East India Company with the Treaty of Seringapatam in 1792. The British formed the Malabar District and built their headquarters at Kozhikode. The headquarters of North Malabar was at Thalassery and that of South Malabar was at Cherpulassery. The headquarters of South Malabar was later changed to Ottapalam. Ottapalam was a part of Walluvanad Taluk of Malappuram Revenue Division in Malabar District with its Taluk headquarters at Perinthalmanna during British Raj. The railway was installed and the town was renamed as Ottappalam. The South Malabar Special Court started functioning at Ottappalam by 1880, and with that Ottappalam became the common name for the town. Gradually, the name Ayirur-Thekkummuri was confined to the land records.

Before Indian Independence, present-day Kerala state was scattered in South Canara and Malabar Districts of British India and two princely states namely Cochin and Travancore. The first All-Kerala conference of Indian National Congress was held in 1921 at Ottapalam, which was the then capital of South Malabar, on the bank of the river Bharathappuzha, which also later demanded a separate state for the Malayalam-speaking regions in future Independent India. Kerala Pradesh Congress Committee was formed in that conference. Before that, Malabar District, Cochin, and Travancore had separate Congress committees.

== Geography ==
Ottapalam is located at 10.77°N 76.38°E. It has an average elevation of 54 m (177 ft).

== Climate ==
Climate data for Ottapalam, Kerala
Month	Jan	Feb	Mar	Apr	May	Jun	Jul	Aug	Sep	Oct	Nov	Dec	Year
Mean daily maximum °C (°F)	32.8 (91.0)	34.5 (94.1)	35.8 (96.4)	35.1 (95.2)	33.2 (91.8)	29.5 (85.1)	28.6 (83.5)	29.1 (84.4)	30.2 (86.4)	30.8 (87.4)	31.6 (88.9)	32.0 (89.6)	31.9 (89.5)
Mean daily minimum °C (°F)	22.3 (72.1)	23.2 (73.8)	24.8 (76.6)	25.7 (78.3)	25.2 (77.4)	23.6 (74.5)	22.9 (73.2)	23.5 (74.3)	23.5 (74.3)	23.7 (74.7)	23.4 (74.1)	22.4 (72.3)	23.7 (74.6)
Average precipitation mm (inches)	2 (0.1)	12 (0.5)	27 (1.1)	103 (4.1)	211 (8.3)	566 (22.3)	687 (27.0)	349 (13.7)	203 (8.0)	264 (10.4)	136 (5.4)	23 (0.9)	2,583 (101.8)
Source: Climate-Data.org

== Administration ==
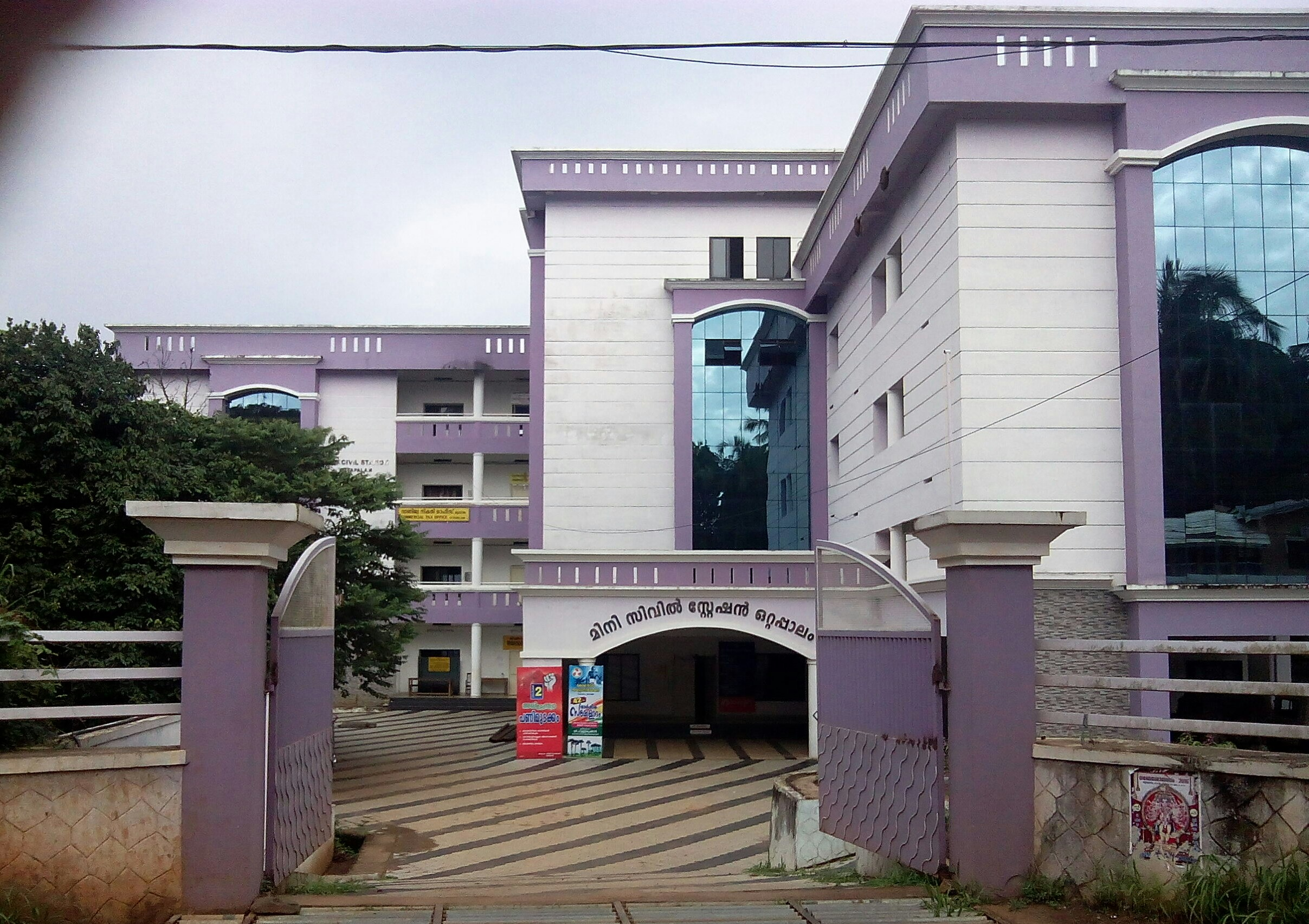
Ottapalam Minicivil Station

Ottapalam is sub district of the Palakkad District. Over the last 10 years, the population growth has been 9.2%. The town is listed in the top 18 most populous Urban Agglomeration in Kerala. The First Defence Park in India is established in Ottapalam KINFRA industrial park.

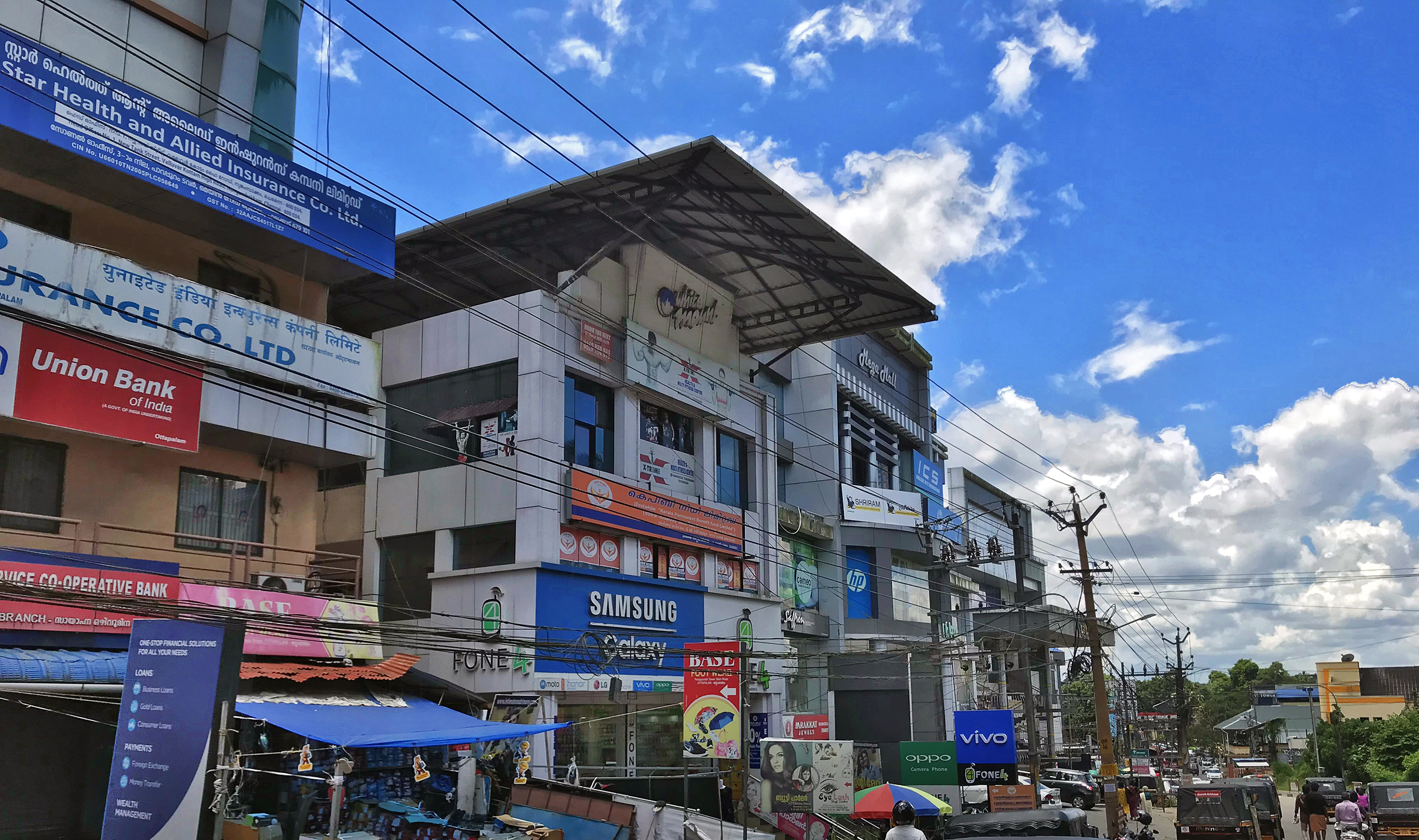
Ottapalam town area

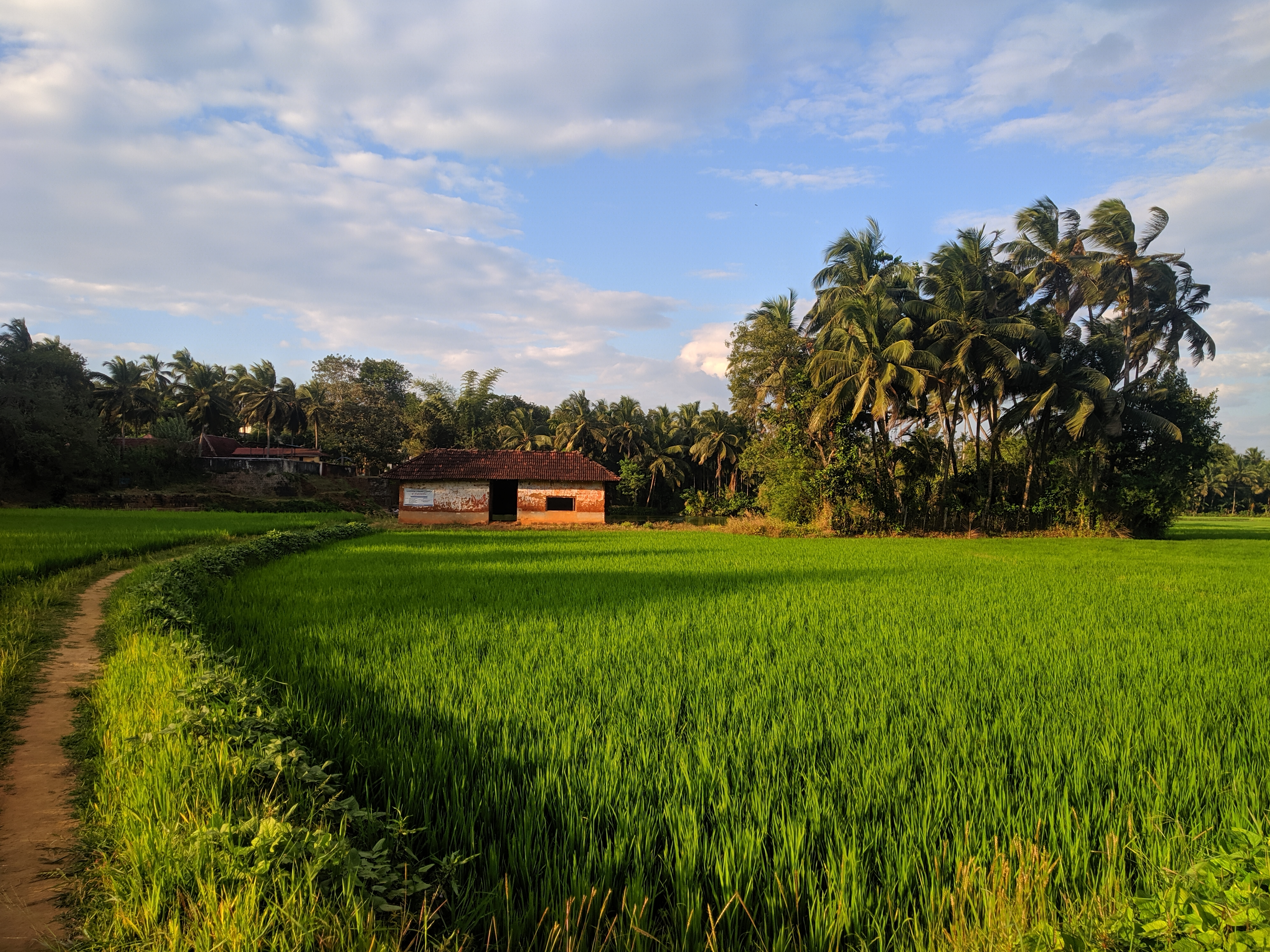
Paddy fields, Ottapalam

The Ottapalam assembly constituency is part of Palakkad Lok Sabha constituency.

=== Ottapalam Taluk ===
Ottapalam is one of the six Taluks of Palakkad district.

== Transport ==
=== Road ===
The Palakkad-Shoranur (Kulappully) State Highway passes through the town. Government buses as well as private bus services operate between Ottapalam and other major towns, such as Palakkad, Thrissur, Mannarkkad, Pattambi, Guruvayoor, Perinthalmanna, Thiruvilwamala and Chelakkara (through the Ottapalam-Mayanur Bridge, inaugurated on 22 January 2011).

=== Rail ===
The town is served by the Ottapalam railway station, which lies between Palakkad and Shoranur Junction on the Jolarpettai–Shoranur line. Fifty Indian Railways trains stop at the station.

== Notable people ==
The following people were either born in and/or are residents of Ottapalam:

- Ottapalam Pappan, Malayalam Drama and Film Actor
- Gautham Vasudev Menon, Tamil Film director
- Stephen Devassy, pianist
- Lal Jose, Malayalam film director
- Anil Radhakrishnan Menon, Malayalam film director
- Unni Mukundan, Malayalam film actor
- Bhaskar Menon, first Indian to head a multinational corporation, chairman of Lever Brothers (now Unilever)
- K. P. S. Menon, first Foreign Secretary of India. He also served pre-independence India as an Agent-General to China
- M. G. K. Menon, former Union Minister and Scientific Adviser in the Rajiv Gandhi administration
- KP Candeth, was a prominent Lieutenant General in the Indian army
- Shivshankar Menon, 4th National Security Advisor and 26th foreign secretary
- V. P. Menon, seniormost Indian officer in pre-independence British India administration
- M. K. Narayanan, the former chief of the Intelligence Bureau and former National Security Adviser
- K. Sankaran Nair, former director of Research and Analysis Wing and former High Commissioner of India to Singapore
- C. Venkataraman Sundaram, former director of Indira Gandhi Centre for Atomic Research and Padma Bhushan recipient
- Dhruvan, Malayalam Film Actor
- Srinish Aravind, Television Actor

== See also ==
- Ottapalam railway station
- NSS College, Ottapalam
- Ottapalam Assembly constituency
- Ottapalam Lok Sabha constituency(old)
