= United Democratic Front (Kerala) =

Congress-led alliance in Kerala, India

United Democratic Front ഐക്യ ജനാധിപത്യ മുന്നണി
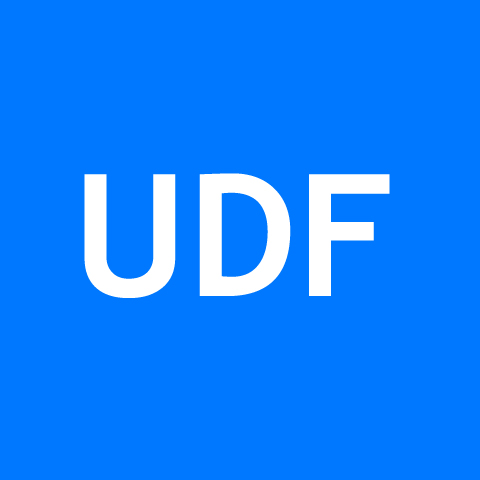
- Abbreviation: UDF
- Leader: V. D. Satheesan (Chief Minister of Kerala); Adoor Prakash (convenor)
- Chairperson: V. D. Satheesan
- Rajya Sabha Leader: Jebi Mather
- Lok Sabha Leader: Priyanka Gandhi
- Founders: K. Karunakaran
- Founded: 1979; 47 years ago
- Headquarters: Indira Bhavan, Vellayambalam, Thiruvananthapuram District, Kerala
- Student wing: The United Democratic Students' Front
- Political position: Centre
- National affiliation: Indian National Developmental Inclusive Alliance
- Colours: Blue
- Rajya Sabha: 3 / 9
- Lok Sabha: 18 / 20
- Kerala Legislative Assembly: 102 / 140
- Gram Panchayats: 505 / 941
- Block Panchayats: 79 / 152
- District Panchayats: 7 / 14
- Municipalities: 54 / 87
- Municipal Corporation: 4 / 6

Website
- udf.in

The United Democratic Front (UDF) is the Indian National Congress–led alliance of political parties in the Indian state of Kerala. It is one of the two major political alliances in Kerala, the other being Communist Party of India (Marxist)–led Left Democratic Front, each of which has been in power alternately since the 1980 E. K. Nayanar ministry until the 2026 Legislative Assembly election in the state. It is the current ruling political alliance of Kerala, since 2026. Most of the United Democratic Front constituents are members of the Indian National Congress–led Indian National Developmental Inclusive Alliance at pan-India level.

United Democratic Front was created by the Indian National Congress (then known as Congress-Indira) party leader K. Karunakaran in 1979, as a successor to the existing Congress-led alliance. The alliance first came to power in 1981 (K. Karunakaran ministry) and has won elections to the state legislature of Kerala in the years 1982 (Karunakaran ministry), 1991 (Karunakaran and A. K. Antony ministries), 2001 (Antony and Oommen Chandy ministries), 2011 (Oommen Chandy ministry), and 2026 (V. D. Satheesan ministry). United Democratic Front leaders V. D. Satheesan and Sunny Joseph currently serve as the Chief Minister and Kerala Pradesh Congress Committee President respectively.

The alliance currently consists of Indian National Congress, Indian Union Muslim League, Kerala Congress (Joseph), Kerala Congress (Jacob), Revolutionary Socialist Party and a variety of other smaller parties. The alliance follows big tent policy and includes a variety political parties.

== Current members ==
Party		Abbr.	Flag	MPs in Lok Sabha	MPs in Rajya Sabha	MLA in state legislature	Party Chief/ President in Kerala	Parliamentary Party Leader in Kerala Legislative Assembly
1	Indian National Congress	INC		14	01	63	Sunny Joseph	V.D. Satheeshan
2	Indian Union Muslim League	IUML		03	02	22	Sadiq Ali Thangal	P.K. Kunjalikutty
3	Kerala Congress	KEC		01	00	07	P. J. Joseph	Mons Joseph
4	Revolutionary Socialist Party	RSP		01	00	03	Shibu Baby John	Shibu Baby John
5	Kerala Congress (Jacob)	KEC(J)		00	00	01	Anoop Jacob	Anoop Jacob
6	Kerala Democratic Party	KDP		00	00	01	Mani C. Kappan	Mani C. Kappan
8	Revolutionary Marxist Party of India	RMPI		00	00	01	N. Venu	K.K. Rema
7	Communist Marxist Party	CMP		00	00	01	C. P. John	C.P. John
9	All India Forward Bloc	AIFB		00	00	00	T. Manoj Kumar	-
10	Janathipathiya Samrakshana Samithy	JSS		00	00	00	A. N. Rajan Babu	-

=== Associate Members ===
- Kerala Pravasi Association
- Janadhipathya Rashtriya Sabha

== History ==
=== Antecedents ===
Precursors to the United Democratic Front were,

- Joint Front (Pattom and Sankar ministries)
  - Congress – Praja Socialist Party – Indian Union Muslim League (left 1961)
- Congress-supported "Mini Front" or "Democratic Front" (Menon ministry)
  - Communist Party of India - Indian Union Muslim League - Kerala Congress – Indian Socialist Party
- Congress-supported "United Front"
  - "Mini Front" or "Maxi Front" (Second Menon ministry)
    - Congress (from 1971) – Communist Party of India Indian Union Muslim League - Revolutionary Socialist Party - Praja Socialist Party - Kerala Congress (from 1975)
  - "Ruling Front" or "Maxi Front Revamped" (Karunakaran, Antony and P. K. V. ministries)
    - Congress – Communist Party of India – Kerala Congress - Indian Union Muslim League - Revolutionary Socialist Party
  - Indian Union Muslim League - Praja Socialist Party – National Democratic Party alliance (supported by Congress) (Koya ministry)

=== United Democratic Front (1979 – present) ===
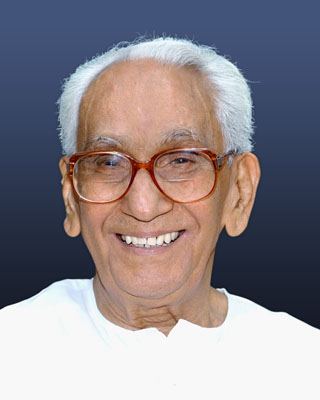
The third-longest serving chief minister of Kerala, K. Karunakaran, was the founder of United Democratic Front

The United Democratic Front (UDF) was formed just before 1980 assembly election. In elections, the Front was defeated by the Communist Party of India (Marxist)–led Left Democratic Front. However, the fall of the first Left Democratic Front ministry resulted in the 6th President's Rule in Kerala (1981).

United Democratic Front first came into power in Kerala in 1981 under K. Karunakaran. It led the Government of Kerala in 1982–87 (K. Karunakaran), 1991–96 (K. Karunakaran and A. K. Antony), 2001–06 (A. K. Antony and Oommen Chandy), and 2011–16 (Oommen Chandy) and 2026-present (V. D. Satheesan). The alliance currently serves as the ruling alliance in the Kerala Assembly.

- In the 2016 elections conducted to the Kerala state legislature, United Democratic Front managed to win 47 out of 140 seats to the assembly, and Congress leader Ramesh Chennithala was chosen as the Leader of Opposition. In 2019 Indian general election, the alliance won 19 out of 20 seats in the state.
- In the 2021 elections conducted to the Kerala state legislature, United Democratic Front managed to win 40 out of 140 seats to the assembly, and Congress leader V. D. Satheesan chosen as the Leader of Opposition. The alliance supported K. K. Rema for Vadakara Constituency who sits as a separate block. In 2024 Indian general election, the alliance won 18 out of 20 seats in the state.
- In the last elections conducted to the Kerala state legislature in 2026, United Democratic Front managed to win 102 out of 140 seats to the assembly, and Congress leader V. D. Satheesan chosen as the Chief Minister of Kerala.

== Chief Ministers ==
=== Pre-United Democratic Front Chief Ministers (1956–1979) ===
- Pattom Thanu Pillai (1960–1962)
- R. Sankar (1962–1964)
- C. Achutha Menon (1970–1977)
- K. Karunakaran (1977)
- A. K. Antony (1977–78)
- P.K. Vasudevan Nair (1978–79)
- C.H. Mohammed Koya (1979)

=== United Democratic Front Chief Ministers (1981–present) ===
United Democratic Front Chief Ministers
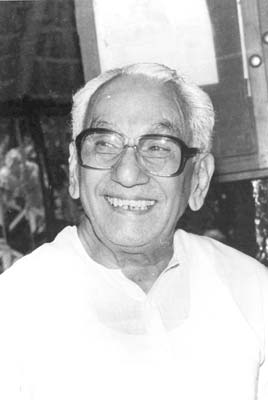
K. Karunakaran (1981–82, 1982–1987, 1991–1995)

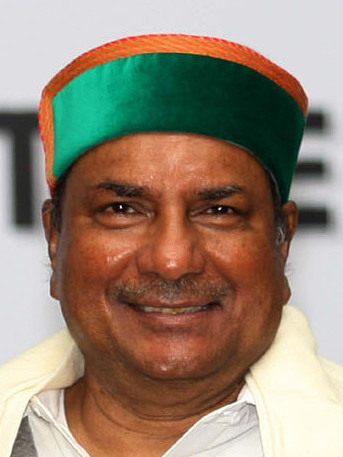
A. K. Antony (1995–96, 2001–2004)

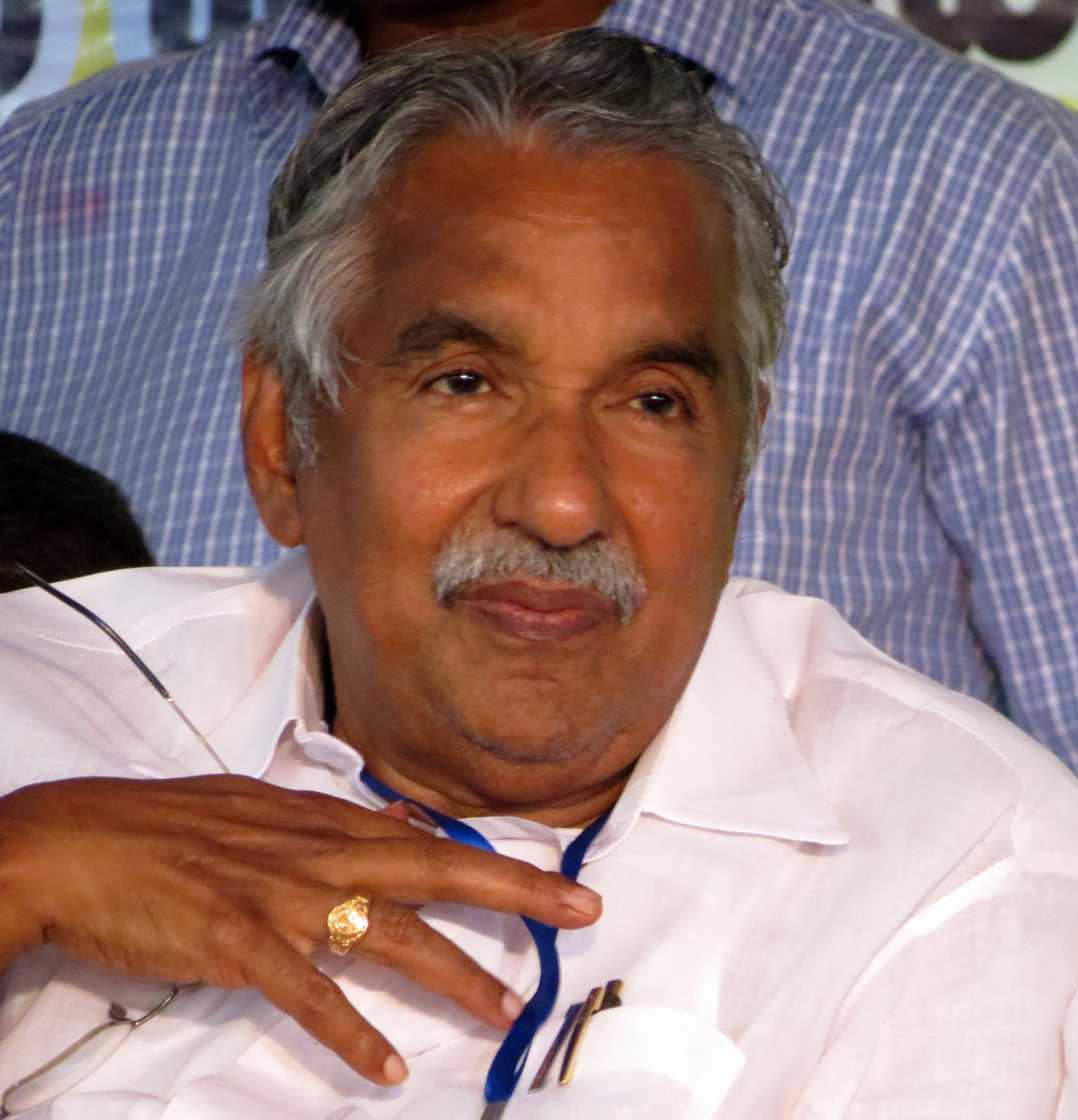
Oommen Chandy (2004–2006, 2011–2016)

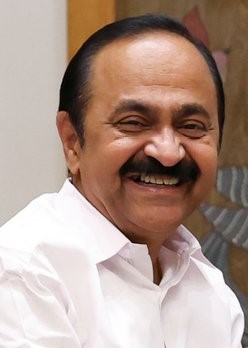
V.D. Satheesan (2026-Incumbent)

=== List of United Democratic Front Chief Ministers by length of term ===
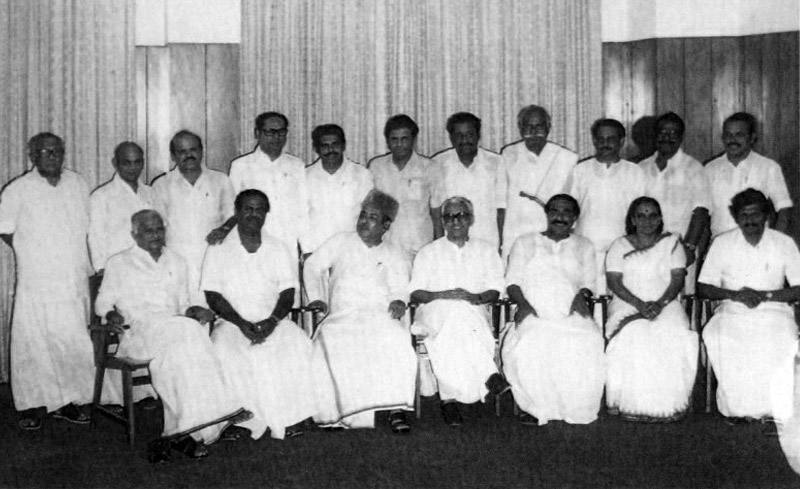
United Democratic Front ministry in 1983 (3rd Karunakaran ministry, 1982–1987)

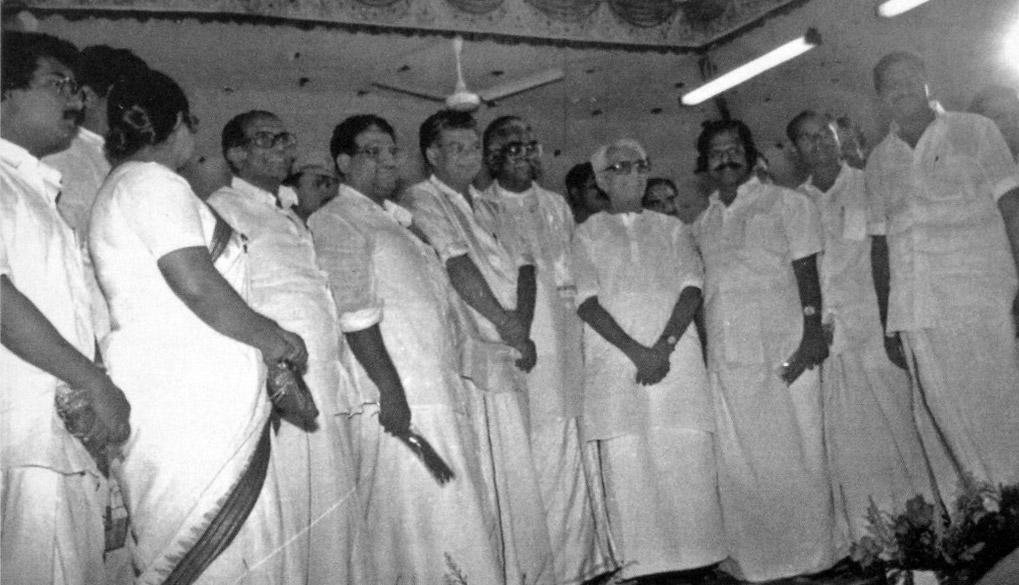
United Democratic Front ministry in 1991 (4th Karunakaran ministry, 1991–1995)

No.	Name (Ministry)	Length of term	
No.	Name (Ministry)	Longest continuous term	Total years of premiership
1	K. Karunakaran (1918–2010): 1st Karunakaran ministry (1977); 2nd Karunakaran ministry (1981–82); 3rd Karunakaran ministry (1982–1987); 4th Karunakaran ministry (1991–1995)	4 years, 305 days (1982–1987)	8 years, 315 days (four terms)
2	A. K. Antony (born 1940): 1st Antony ministry (1977–78); 2nd Antony ministry (1995–96); 3rd Antony ministry (2001–2004)	3 years, 74 days (2001–2004)	5 years, 306 days (three terms)
3	Oommen Chandy (born 1943): 1st Chandy ministry (2004–2006); 2nd Chandy ministry (2011–2016)	5 years, 6 days (2011–2016)	6 years, 256 days (two terms)
4	V.D. Satheesan (born 1964): Satheesan ministry (2026-Incumbent)	186 days (Incumbent)	186 days (Incumbent)

== Leaders of Opposition (U. D. F) ==
- K. Karunakaran (1980–81, 1987–91)
- A. K. Antony (1996–2001)
- Oommen Chandy (2006–11)
- Ramesh Chennithala (2016–21)
- V. D. Satheesan (2021– 2026)

== United Democratic Front Conveners ==
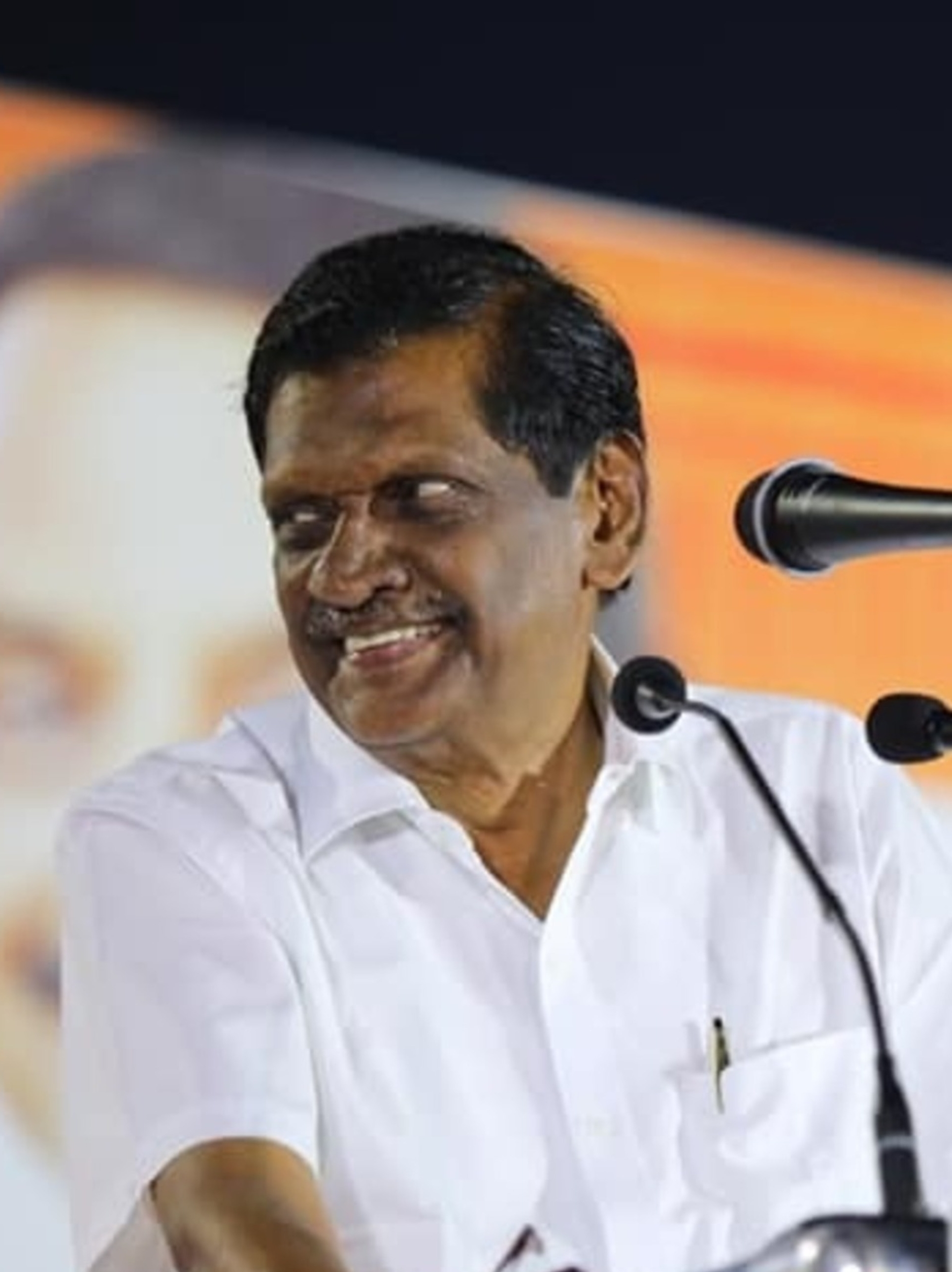
P. J. Joseph served as the first United Democratic Front Convener (1980–82)

Period	U D F Convener	Political affiliation
1979–80	Nil	
1980–82	P. J. Joseph	Kerala Congress
1982–85	Oommen Chandy	Indian National Congress
1985–2001	K. Sankaranarayanan	Indian National Congress
2001–04	Oommen Chandy	Indian National Congress
2004–18	P. P. Thankachan	Indian National Congress
2018–20	Benny Behanan	Indian National Congress
2020–25	M. M. Hassan	Indian National Congress
2025–incumbent	Adoor Prakash	Indian National Congress

== Legacy ==
=== K. Karunakaran ===
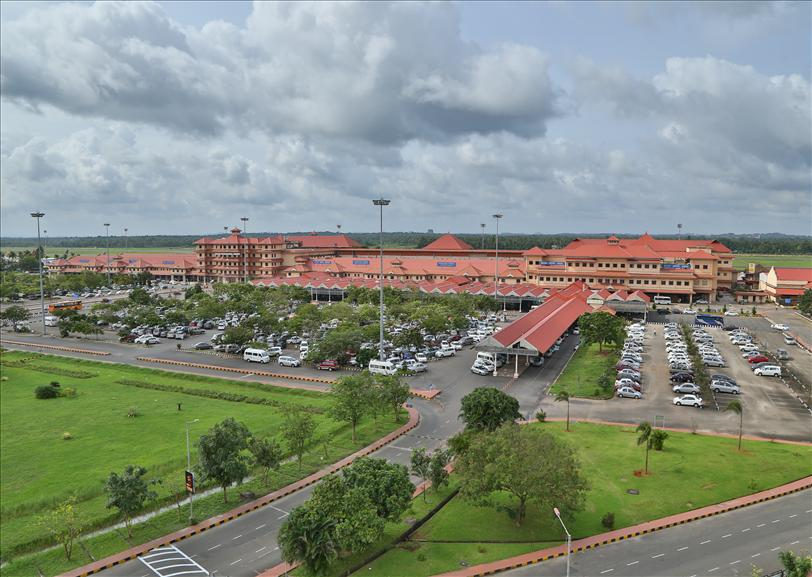
Cochin International Airport

The Mahatma Gandhi University, Kottayam, was established by bifurcating University of Kerala during the period of 3rd Karunakaran ministry (1982–87). It was during the second U. D. F. government (Third Karunakaran ministry), that the last two districts of Kerala, namely Pathanamthitta and Kasaragod, were inaugurated, raising the total number of districts in Kerala to fourteen. During his third tenure as Chief Minister (1982–87), Karunakaran directly handled the Scheduled Castes Development. Kerala State Film Development Corporation was also introduced during the tenure of Karunakaran.

Chief Minister Karunakaran was instrumental in several infrastructure projects in Kerala which includes the Jawaharlal Nehru Stadium in Kochi, and the Cochin International Airport, both of which were sanctioned during his 1991–95 stint as the Chief Minister. Vallarpadam Terminal, which later became the first transshipment terminal in India was other key project coined during the administration of Karunakaran. Other major infrastructure projects introduced during the terms of Karunakaran include the Goshree Bridges of Kochi, Guruvayur Railway Line, and Rajiv Gandhi Combined Cycle Power Plant at Kayamkulam. The first phase of Kollam Bypass was completed in 1993.

=== A. K. Antony ===
Antony administration was instrumental in the establishment of Rajiv Gandhi Centre for Biotechnology at Thiruvananthapuram. The InfoPark at Kochi was established in the year 2004. It was also under his administration that the Kannur University was created by bifurcating the University of Calicut. The University of Sanskrit was inaugurated in 1994. The Indian Institute of Management and the National Institute of Technology at Kozhikode were established in the years 1996 and 2002 respectively.

The Akshaya Project was implemented in 2002 to expand digital literacy in Kerala. During his tenure as Chief Minister, A. K. Antony introduced the Unemployment Allowance, Festival Allowance for the Kerala state employees.

During his tenure as Chief Minister, A. K. Antony introduced the prohibition of arrack in Kerala. It was at Chief Minister Antony's behest that the decision to construct the new Kerala Legislature Complex was taken in 1977. He also ordered the closure of the Kerala Coca-Cola plant in 2004 due to non-availability of drinking water in the plant area.

=== Oommen Chandy ===
It was also during tenure of Oommen Chandy that 12 new taluks, 28 new municipalities, and Kannur Municipal Corporation were formed. It was the largest taluk delimitation in the state of Kerala after 1957. The Kerala Urban Road Transport Corporation (KURTC) was formed under KSRTC in 2015 to manage affairs related to urban transportation.

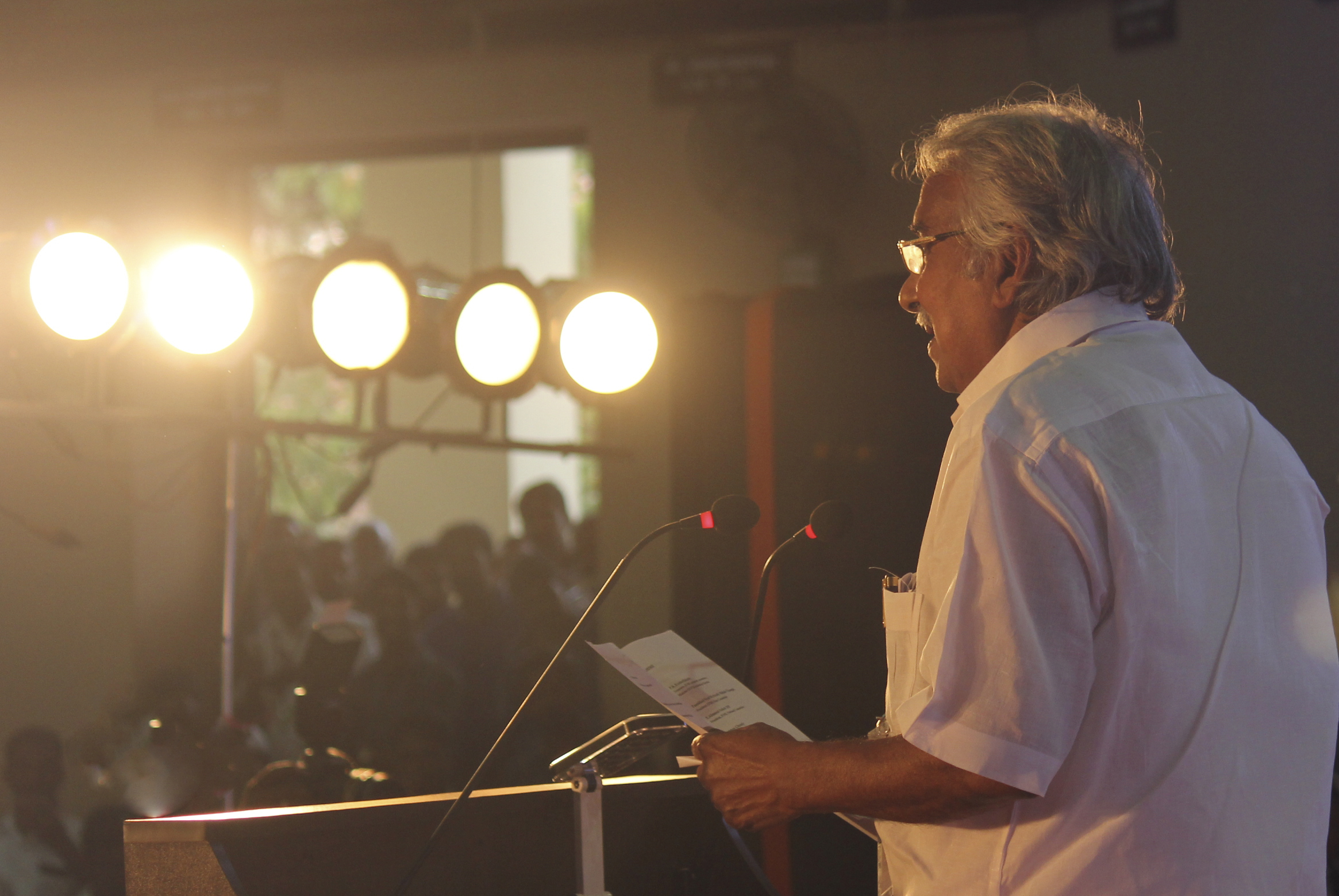
Oommen Chandy in September 2015

The Chandy ministry established new Government Medical Colleges in Kerala (in 2013, after a gap of 31 years). The "Karunya Scheme" was implemented in the year 2011–12 for the free treatment of patients with cancer, haemophilia, kidney, and heart diseases. A number of organ implantation surgeries were done through the "Mruthasanjeevani Project". The Second Chandy ministry had also taken the decision to prohibit liquor in Kerala by discouraging bars. The number of political killings were relatively low (11) during the period 2011–16 in the state.

Rubber subsidy to ensure a minimum price of Rs 150/kg was implemented in 2015.

In 2005, Information Technology was made a compulsory subject for the school-level students. Victers TV, the children's television channel on EDUSAT for schools, was inaugurated in 2005. The National University of Advanced Legal Studies at Kochi was founded in 2005 and the Indian Institute of Technology at Palakkad was established in the year 2015. The universities founded in 2011–16 period include the Malayalam University at Tirur (2012) and Technological University at Thiruvananthapuram (2014). The National Institute of Visual Science and Arts at Kottayam was inaugurated in January 2016. Kerala was declared as the first complete digital state of India on 27 February 2016.

The Kerala Public Service Commission filled the vacant posts during 2011–16. As many as 167,096 job candidates were appointed, setting a record. As many as 46,223 posts were created in the same period. The Phase-3 of the Technopark at Thiruvananthapuram was inaugurated in 2014. The Taurus Downtown at Technopark was commenced during the period 2011–16. The phase-2 of InfoPark, Kochi was inaugurated in May 2015. Phase-2 of InfoPark Thrissur was completed during the same period. The Park Centre of Cybercity at Kozhikode was formally opened by IT Minister P.K. Kunhalikutty on 15 February 2014. UL Cyberpark at Kozhikode was inaugurated in January 2016. Chandy's regime was instrumental in beginning the construction of the Smart City Project.

Chandy received the United Nations' Public Service Award for his Mass Contact Programme ("Jana Samparkka Paripadi"). The government also sanctioned of Unemployment Allowance. Social welfare pension amounts and numbers were doubled during the second Chandy ministry. Old-age pension amounts were also increased. Other social welfare measures during Chandy reign include free ration for those who lost their employment. Free rice was given to those who did not belong to Above Poverty Line (APL). Food kits were distributed to the people during Onam, the Eid, and Christmas.

Chandy government constructed more than 400,000 houses for the homeless people in Kerala.

Chandy's regime was instrumental in beginning the construction of Kannur Airport, the Kochi Metro, and the Vizhinjam Port near Thiruvananthapuram. The Kochi-Mangalore GAIL pipeline was commissioned by the second Chandy ministry in 2013. In 2015, the Cochin Airport became the world's first fully solar powered airport. During his period, 227 road bridges worth nearly Rs 16 billion were built across Kerala.

A number of state highways were constructed under Chandy government and the final decision to widen the national highways of the state to 45 m were taken in 2014. Several "bypass" roads were also constructed.

== Electoral History ==
=== Kerala Assembly Election results ===
Vote share in consecutive Kerala Assembly elections
1982	48.25%
1987	43.65%
1991	44.84%
1996	44.84%
2001	49.05%
2006	42.98%
2011	45.83%
2016	38.81%
2021	39.47%
2026	46.54%

Assembly election results
Election	Alliance leader	Seats won	Change in seats	Outcome
1980	K. Karunakaran	46 / 140	New	Opposition, later Government
1982	K. Karunakaran	77 / 140	▲31	Government
1987	K. Karunakaran	61 / 140	▼16	Opposition
1991	K. Karunakaran	90 / 140	▲29	Government
1996	A. K. Antony	59 / 140	▼31	Opposition
2001	A. K. Antony	99 / 140	▲40	Government
2006	Oommen Chandy	42 / 140	▼57	Opposition
2011	Oommen Chandy	72 / 140	▲30	Government
2016	Oommen Chandy	47 / 140	▼25	Opposition
2021	Ramesh Chennithala	41 / 140	▼6	Opposition
2026	V. D. Satheesan	102 / 140	▲61	Government

Mandate	Seats secured				Ruling coalition	Majority
Mandate	LDF	UDF	NDA	Others	Ruling coalition	Majority
1980	93	46	0	1	LDF	47
1982	63	77	0	0	UDF	14
1987	78	61	0	1	LDF	17
1991	48	90	0	2	UDF	40
1996	80	59	0	1	LDF	21
2001	40	99	0	1	UDF	59
2006	98	42	0	0	LDF	56
2011	68	72	0	0	UDF	04
2016	91	47	1	1	LDF	44
2021	99	41	0	0	LDF	59
2026	35	102	3	0	UDF	67

=== Lok Sabha ===
Vote share in Kerala Lok Sabha elections
1980	46.04%
1984	51.29%
1989	49.29%
1991	48.59%
1996	45.75%
1998	46.08%
1999	46.9%
2004	38.38%
2009	47.73%
2014	41.98%
2019	47.48%
2024	45.21%

Election	Seats won	Change in seats	Voteshare	Outcome
1980	08 / 20	New	Steady	Government
1984	18 / 20	▲10	51.29%	Government
1989	17 / 20	▼1	49.29%	Opposition
1991	16 / 20	▼1	48.59%	Government
1996	10 / 20	▼6	45.75%	Opposition
1998	11 / 20	▲1	46.08%	Opposition
1999	11 / 20	Steady	46.9%	Opposition
2004	01 / 20	▼10	38.38%	Government
2009	16 / 20	▲15	47.73%	Government
2014	12 / 20	▼4	41.98%	Opposition
2019	19 / 20	▲7	47.48%	Opposition
2024	18 / 20	▼01	45.21%	Opposition

=== In Kerala Municipal Corporations ===
Corporation	Election Year	Seats won/ Total seats	Sitting side
Thiruvananthapuram Corporation	2025	20 / 101	Others
Kozhikode Municipal Corporation	2025	28 / 76	Opposition
Kochi Municipal Corporation	2025	48 / 76	Government
Kollam Municipal Corporation	2025	27 / 56	Government
Thrissur Municipal Corporation	2025	35 / 56	Government
Kannur Municipal Corporation	2025	36 / 56	Government

=== Kerala local body elections ===
The United Democratic Front (UDF), who is state government, won in nearly two-third of all gram panchayats and block panchayats, half of district panchayats and in four out of six municipal corporations in the 2025 Kerala local elections.

2015 Kerala local elections
Local self-government body	Local Bodies won				Total
Local self-government body	UDF	LDF	NDA	Others	Total
Gram Panchayats	365	549	14	13	941
Block Panchayats	61	90	0	1	152
District Panchayats	7	7	0	0	14
Municipalities	41	44	1	0	87
Corporations	2	4	0	0	6

2020 Kerala local elections
Local self-government body	Local Bodies in lead					Total
Local self-government body	UDF	LDF	NDA	Others	Tie	Total
Grama Panchayats	321	514	19	23	64	941
Block Panchayats	38	108	0	0	6	152
District Panchayats	3	11	0	0	0	14
Municipalities	41	43	2	0	0	86
Corporations	1	5	0	0	0	6

2025 Kerala local elections
Local self-government body	Local Bodies in lead					Total
Local self-government body	UDF	LDF	NDA	Others	Tie	Total
Grama Panchayats	505	340	26	6	64	941
Block Panchayats	79	63	0	0	10	152
District Panchayats	7	7	0	0	0	14
Municipalities	54	28	2	1	1	86
Corporations	4	1	1	0	0	6

== List of elected members ==
=== State legislature ===
Map of Kerala showing 2026 state Legislative Assembly election results

The United Democratic Front currently has 102 members in the 140-member Kerala Legislative Assembly. The alliance currently forms the Opposition in the Assembly.

Key

Indian National Congress (INC) Indian Union Muslim League (IUML) Kerala Congress (KEC) Kerala Congress (Jacob) (KC(J)) Revolutionary Marxist Party of India (RMPI) Kerala Democratic Party (KDP) Revolutionary Socialist Party (India) (RSPI) Communist Marxist Party (CMP) Independents (IND)

No.	Constituency	Name	Party
1	Manjeshwaram	A. K. M. Ashraf	IUML
2	Kasaragod	Kallatra Mahin	IUML
3	Udma	K. Neelakandan	INC
4	Thrikaripur	Sandeep Varier	INC
5	Payyanur	V. Kunhikrishnan	IND
6	Taliparamba	T K Govindan Master	IND
7	Irikkur	Sajeev Joseph	INC
8	Kannur	T.O Mohanan	INC
9	Peravoor	Adv Sunny Joseph	INC
10	Mananthavady (ST)	Usha Vijayan	INC
11	Sulthan Bathery (ST)	I. C. Balakrishnan	INC
12	Kalpetta	T. Siddique	INC
13	Vatakara	K. K. Rema	RMPI
14	Kuttiady	Parakkal Abdulla	IUML
15	Nadapuram	K. M. Abhijith	INC
16	Koyilandy	K. Praveen Kumar	INC
17	Perambra	Fathima Thahiliya	IUML
18	Balussery (SC)	V. T. Sooraj	INC
19	Elathur	Vidya Balakrishnan	INC
20	Kozhikode North	K.Jayanth	INC
21	Kozhikode South	Fyzal Babu	IUML
22	Kunnamangalam	M. A. Razak Master	IUML
23	Koduvally	P. K. Firos	IUML
24	Thiruvambady	C. K. Kasim	IUML
25	Kondotty	T. P Ashrafali	IUML
26	Eranad	P. K. Basheer	IUML
27	Nilambur	Aryadan Shoukath	INC
28	Wandoor (SC)	A. P. Anil Kumar	INC
29	Manjeri	M. Rahmathulla	IUML
30	Perinthalmanna	Najeeb Kanthapuram	IUML
31	Mankada	Manjalamkuzhi Ali	IUML
32	Malappuram	P. K. Kunhalikutty	IUML
33	Vengara	K. M. Shaji	IUML
34	Vallikkunnu	T. V. Ibrahim	IUML
35	Tirurangadi	P. M. A. Sameer	IUML
36	Tanur	P. K. Navas	IUML
37	Tirur	Kurukkoli Moideen	IUML
38	Kottakkal	K. K. Abid Hussain Thangal	IUML
39	Thavanur	V. S Joy	INC
40	Ponnani	K. P Noushad Ali	INC
41	Thrithala	V. T. Balram	INC
42	Kongad (SC)	K. A. Thulasi	INC
43	Mannarkkad	N. Samsudheen	IUML
44	Palakkad	Ramesh Pisharody	INC
45	Chittur	Sumesh Achuthan	INC
46	Thrissur	Rajan Pallan	INC
47	Irinjalakuda	Thomas Unniyadan	KC
48	Chalakudy	Saneeshkumar Joseph	INC
49	Kodungallur	O. J. Janeesh	INC
50	Perumbavoor	Manoj Moothedan	INC
51	Angamaly	Roji M. John	INC
52	Aluva	Anwar Sadath	INC
53	Kalamassery	V. E. Abdul Gafoor	IUML
54	Paravur	V. D. Satheesan	INC
55	Vypin	Tony Chammany	INC
56	Kochi	Mohammad Shiyas	INC
57	Thrippunithura	Deepak Joy	INC
58	Ernakulam	T. J. Vinod	INC
59	Thrikkakara	Uma Thomas	INC
60	Kunnathunad (SC)	V. P. Sajeendran	INC
61	Piravom	Anoop Jacob	KEC(J)
62	Muvattupuzha	Mathew Kuzhalnadan	INC
63	Kothamangalam	Shibu Thekkumpuram	KC
64	Devikulam (SC)	F Raja	INC
65	Udumbanchola	Senapathy Venu	INC
66	Thodupuzha	Apu John Joseph	KC
67	Idukki	Roy K Paulose	INC
68	Peerumade	Cyriac Thomas	INC
69	Pala	Mani C. Kappan	KDP
70	Kaduthuruthy	Mons Joseph	KC
71	Vaikom (SC)	K. Binimon	INC
72	Ettumanoor	Nattakom Suresh	INC
73	Kottayam	Thiruvanchoor Radhakrishnan	INC
74	Puthuppally	Chandy Oommen	INC
75	Changanassery	Vinu Job Kuzhimannil	KC
76	Kanjirappally	Rony K Baby	INC
77	Poonjar	Sebastian M. J.	INC
78	Aroor	Shanimol Osman	INC
79	Alappuzha	A.D.Thomas	INC
80	Ambalappuzha	G. Sudhakaran	IND
81	Kuttanad	Reji Cheriyan	KC
82	Haripad	Ramesh Chennithala	INC
83	Kayamkulam	M. Liju	INC
84	Thiruvalla	Varghese Mammen	KC
85	Ranni	Pazhakulam Madhu	INC
86	Aranmula	Abin Varkey	INC
87	Adoor (SC)	Adv. C. V. Santhakumar	INC
88	Karunagapally	C. R. Mahesh	INC
89	Chavara	Shibu Baby John	RSP
90	Kunnathur (SC)	Ullas Kovoor	RSP
91	Pathanapuram	Jyothi Kumar Chamakkala	INC
92	Chadayamangalam	M. M. Naseer	INC
93	Kundara	P. C. Vishnunadh	INC
94	Kollam	Bindu Krishna	INC
95	Eravipuram	Vishnu Mohan	RSP
96	Chirayinkeezhu (SC)	Ramya Haridas	INC
97	Vamanapuram	Sudheersha Palode	INC
98	Vattiyoorkavu	K. Muraleedharan	INC
99	Thiruvananthapuram	C. P. John	CMP
100	Kattakkada	M. R. Baiju	INC
101	Kovalam	M. Vincent	INC
102	Neyyattinkara	N. Sakthan	INC

=== Lok Sabha ===
Out of the 20 Lok Sabha (House of the People) constituencies in Kerala, 18 were won by the United Democratic Front in 2024 Lok Sabha election.

2024 Indian general election

The following is the list of United Democratic Front Lok Sabha members from the state of Kerala:

Key

INC IUML RSP KEC

No.	Parliamentary Constituency	Member (M. P.)	Party affiliation
1	Kasaragod	Rajmohan Unnithan	INC
2	Kannur	K. Sudhakaran	INC
3	Vatakara	Shafi Parambil	INC
4	Wayanad	Priyanka Gandhi Vadra	INC
5	Kozhikode	M. K. Raghavan	INC
6	Malappuram	E. T. Muhammed Basheer	IUML
7	Ponnani	M.P. Abdussamad Samadani	IUML
8	Palakkad	V. K. Sreekandan	INC
9	Chalakudy	Benny Behanan	INC
10	Ernakulam	Hibi Eden	INC
11	Idukki	Dean Kuriakose	INC
12	Kottayam	K. Francis George	KEC
13	Alappuzha	K. C. Venugopal	INC
14	Mavelikkara	Kodikunnil Suresh	INC
15	Pathanamthitta	Anto Antony Punnathaniyil	INC
16	Kollam	N. K. Premachandran	RSP
17	Attingal	Adoor Prakash	INC
18	Thiruvananthapuram	Shashi Tharoor	INC

=== Rajya Sabha ===
The following is the list of United Democratic Front Rajya Sabha members from the state of Kerala:

Key

INC IUML

No.	State	Member (M. P.)	Party affiliation
1	Kerala	Jebi Mather	INC
2	Kerala	P. V. Abdul Wahab	IUML
3	Kerala	Haris Beeran	IUML

== See also ==
- United Front (1970–79)
- Kerala Pradesh Congress Committee
- Indian National Developmental Inclusive Alliance
- Indian National Congress
- Left Democratic Front
- Indian Union Muslim League
