= Second Achutha Menon ministry =

1970–77 government of Kerala, India

Second Achutha Menon Ministry
- 6th Cabinet of Kerala
- 1970–1977
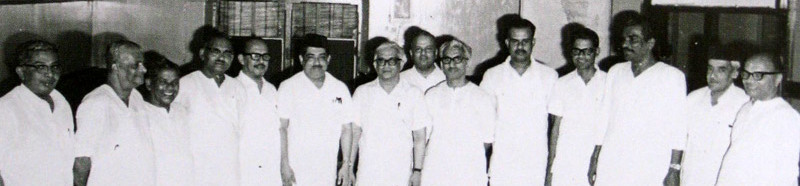
- Date formed: 4 October 1970
- Date dissolved: 25 March 1977

People and organisations
- Head of government: C. Achutha Menon
- Member party: Communist Party of India; Indian National Congress; Indian Union Muslim League; Revolutionary Socialist Party; Kerala Congress; Praja Socialist Party
- Status in legislature: Coalition Majority
- Opposition party: Communist Party of India (Marxist)

History
- Election: 1970 Kerala Legislative Assembly election
- Predecessor: First Achutha Menon Ministry
- Successor: First Karunakaran ministry

The Council of Ministers (1970–77) of Legislative Assembly, Kerala state (better known as C. Achutha Menon ministry - second term) was the Council of Ministers, the executive wing of state government, in the Indian state of Kerala. The ministry was led (Chief Minister) by Communist Party of India leader C. Achutha Menon from 4 October 1970 to 25 March 1977 and had twenty three ministers at various periods.

== Ministers ==
	Minister	Ministry/Portfolio
1	C. Achutha Menon	Chief Minister
2	N. E. Balaram	Minister for Industries
3	P. K. Raghavan	Minister for Harijan Welfare and Housing
4	P. S. Sreenivasan	Minister for Transport & Electricity
5	T. K. Divakaran	Minister for Public Works & Tourism (Expired on 19–01–1976)
6	Baby John	Minister for Revenue & Labour
7	C. H. Mohammed Koya	Minister for Education & Home
8	K. Avukader Kutty Naha	Minister for Fisheries & Local Administration
9	N.K.Balakrishnan	Minister for Agricultural, Health & Co-operation
10	M. N. Govindan Nair	Minister for Transport, Electricity and Housing
11	T. V. Thomas	Minister for Industries
12	K. Karunakaran	Minister for Home Affairs
13	K.T.George	Minister for Finance (Expired on 03–04–1972)
14	Vakkom Purushothaman	Minister for Agriculture & Labour
15	K.G.Adiyodi	Minister for Forests, Food & Finance
16	Vella Eacharan	Minister for Devaswoms, Harijan Welfare, Community Development, Colonization and Settlement.
17	Paul P. Mani	Minister for Food & Civil Supplies
18	Chakkeeri Ahemed Kutty	Minister for Education
19	K. M. Mani	Minister for Finance
20	R. Balakrishna Pillai	Minister for Transport
21	K.Pankajakshan	Minister for Public Works
22	K. M. George	Minister for Transport (Expired on 11–12–1976)
23	K. Narayana Kurup	Minister for Transport

== Resignations ==
C.H. Mohammed Koya resigned on 1 March 1973 due to getting elected to Lok Sabha.

== See also ==
- United Front (Kerala), the coalition that ruled the state from 1970 to 1977 and from 1977 to 1979
