= First Antony ministry =

1977–78 government of Kerala, India

First A. K. Antony Ministry
- 8th Cabinet of Kerala
- 1977-78
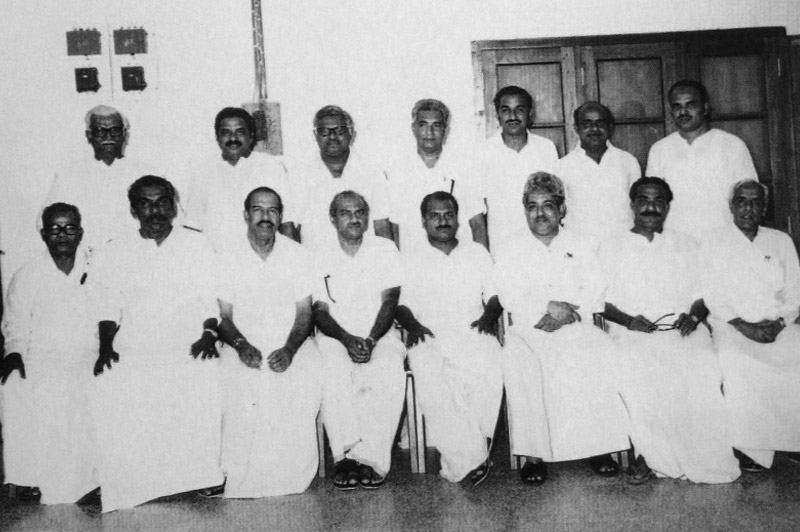
- AK Antony with Kerala Council of Ministers in 1977
- Date formed: 27 April 1977
- Date dissolved: 27 October 1978

People and organisations
- Head of government: A. K. Antony
- Member parties: United Front
- Status in legislature: Majority
- Opposition party: Communist Party of India (Marxist)
- Opposition leader: E. M. S. Namboodiripad

History
- Predecessor: First Karunakaran ministry
- Successor: P. K. Vasudevan Nair ministry

The Fifth Kerala Legislative Assembly Council of Ministers in A. K. Antony's first ministry, was a Kerala Council of Ministers (Kerala Cabinet), the executive wing of Kerala state government, led by Indian National Congress leader A. K. Antony from 27 April 1977 to 27 October 1978. Antony became the 6th Chief Minister of Kerala, following the resignation of K. Karunakaran, and his newly appointed ministry had 15 ministers. A. K. Antony holds the record for becoming the youngest person to hold the post of the Chief Minister of Kerala at the age of 36.

== Ministers ==
	Minister	Party	Ministry/Portfolio	Notes
1	A. K. Antony	Indian National Congress	Chief Minister	
2	K. K. Balakrishnan	Indian National Congress	Minister for Harijan Welfare and Irrigation	
3	M. K. Hemachandran	Indian National Congress	Minister for Finance	
4	Oommen Chandy	Indian National Congress	Minister for Labour	
5	K. Sankaranarayanan	Indian National Congress	Minister for Agriculture	
6a	K. M. Mani	Kerala Congress	Minister for Home Affairs	Resigned w. e. f. 21 December 1977 and again assumed office on 16 September 1978
6b	P. J. Joseph	Kerala Congress	Minister for Home Affairs	Assumed office on 16 January 1978 and resigned w. e. f. 15 September 1978
7	K. Narayana Kurup	Kerala Congress	Minister for Transport	
8a	E. John Jacob	Kerala Congress	Minister for Food and Civil Supplies	Expired on 26 September 1978
8b	T. S. John	Kerala Congress	Minister for Food and Civil Supplies	Assumed office on 19 October 1978
9	K. Avukaderkutty Naha	Indian Union Muslim League	Minister for Local Administration	
10	C. H. Mohammed Koya	Indian Union Muslim League	Minister for Education	(Resigned w.e.f. 20 December 1977 and again assumed office on 4 October 1978
10b	U. A. Beeran	Indian Union Muslim League	Minister for Education	Assumed office on 27 January 1978 and resigned w. e. f. 3 October 1978
11	P. K. Vasudevan Nair	Communist Party of India	Minister for Industries	
12	J. Chitharanjan	Communist Party of India	Minister for Public Health	
13	K. Kunhambu	Indian National Congress	Minister for Forests	
14	Baby John	Revolutionary Socialist Party (India)	Minister for Revenue	
15	K. Pankajakshan	Revolutionary Socialist Party (India)	Minister for Public Works and Sports	

== See also ==
- Chief Ministers of Kerala
- Kerala Ministers
