= Baby John =

Indian politician (1917–2009)

Comrade Baby John

Minister For Revenue, Government of Kerala
- In office 4 October 1970 – 25 March 1977
- Ministry: Second Achutha Menon ministry
- Another Department: Labour (Resigned in 1971)
- Preceded by: K. T. Jacob
- Succeeded by: Baby John
- In office 11 April 1977 – 25 April 1977
- Ministry: First Karunakaran ministry
- Preceded by: Baby John
- Succeeded by: Baby John
- In office 27 April 1977 – 27 October 1978
- Ministry: First Antony ministry
- Another Department: Ports and Fisheries
- Preceded by: Baby John
- Succeeded by: Baby John
- In office 29 October 1978 – 7 October 1979
- Ministry: P. K. Vasudevan Nair ministry
- Another Department: Co-operation
- Preceded by: Baby John
- Succeeded by: K. J. Chacko

Minister of Education, Government of Kerala
- In office 25 January 1980 – 20 October 1981
- Ministry: First Nayanar ministry
- Preceded by: C. H. Muhammed Koya
- Succeeded by: P. J. Joseph

Minister of Irrigation, Government of Kerala
- In office 26 March 1987 – 17 June 1991
- Ministry: Second Nayanar ministry
- Preceded by: K. M. Mani
- Succeeded by: T. M. Jacob
- In office 20 May 1996 – 7 January 1998
- Ministry: Third Nayanar ministry
- Preceded by: T. M. Jacob
- Succeeded by: V. P. Ramakrishna Pillai

Minister of Labour
- In office 20 May 1996 – 7 January 1998
- Ministry: Third Nayanar ministry
- Preceded by: Aryadan Muhammed
- Succeeded by: V. P. Ramakrishna Pillai
- In office 04 October 1970 – 25 September 1971
- Ministry: Second Achutha Menon ministry
- Preceded by: P. Ravindran
- Succeeded by: Vakkom Purushothaman

Member Of Kerala Legislative Assembly
- In office 1977–2001
- Preceded by: Office Established
- Succeeded by: Shibu Baby John
- Constituency: Chavara

Member Of Travancore - Cochin Legislative Assembly
- In office 1954–1955
- Preceded by: N. Sreekantan Nair
- Succeeded by: Office Established
- Constituency: Chavara

Personal details
- Born: 25 October 1917
- Died: 29 January 2008 (aged 90)
- Party: Revolutionary Socialist Party
- Spouse: Annamma (m. 1952)
- Children: Sheila James, Shaji Baby John, Shibu Baby John

Baby John (25 October 1917 – 27 January 2008) was a senior leader of the Kerala Revolutionary Socialist Party (Baby John). Previously, he was General Secretary of the Revolutionary Socialist Party in India. He was known in the Kerala state political circles as 'Kerala Kissinger' for his abilities to manage political crises at times when the state was passing through difficult political phases, with reference to Henry Kissinger, an American diplomat and an advocate of a pragmatic approach to geopolitics.

== Legislative career ==
Baby's legislative career began in the early 1950s, when he was elected to the Travancore-Cochin Assembly. After the formation of Kerala state, he was elected to the Kerala Legislative Assembly from 1960 to 1996, mostly from his home constituency Chavara. He had served as minister; handling different portfolios in coalition governments led by the C. Achutha Menon, K. Karunakaran, A. K. Antony, P. K. Vasudevan Nair, and E. K. Nayanar.
