= Third Karunakaran ministry =

1982–87 state government in Kerala, India

Third K. Karunakaran Ministry
- 13th Cabinet of Kerala
- 1982-1987
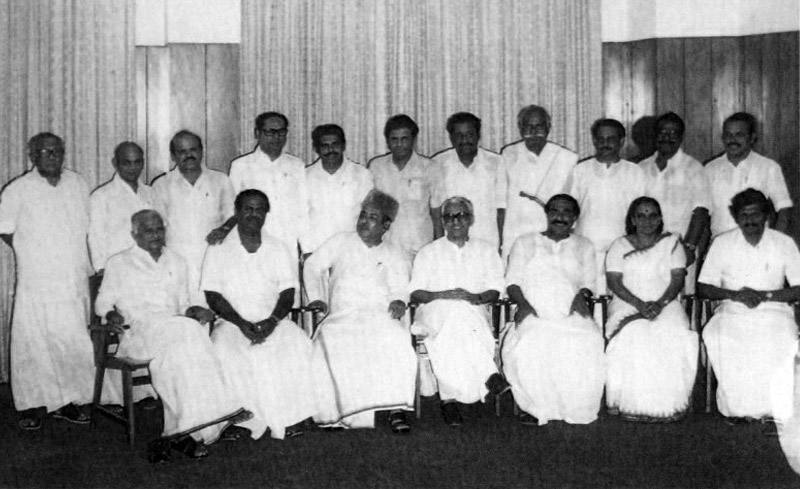
- Third Karunakaran Ministry in 1983
- Date formed: 24 May 1982
- Date dissolved: 25 March 1987

People and organisations
- Head of government: K. Karunakaran
- Member parties: UDF
- Status in legislature: Majority
- Opposition party: LDF
- Opposition leader: E. K. Nayanar

History
- Election: 1982
- Predecessor: Second Karunakaran ministry
- Successor: Second Nayanar ministry

The Seventh Kerala Legislative Assembly Council of Ministers in K. Karunakaran's third ministry, was a Kerala Council of Ministers (Kerala Cabinet), the executive wing of Kerala state government, led by Indian National Congress leader K. Karunakaran from 24 May 1982 to 25 March 1987. It comprised 18 ministers, all belonging to the United Democratic Front. The ministry was formed in the aftermath of the victory of the United Democratic Front in the 1982 assembly elections.

Indian Union Muslim League Leader C.H. Mohammed Koya was sworn as the Deputy Chief Minister of the state, a post he continued to hold until he died on 28 September 1983. Fellow party leader K. Avukaderkutty Naha was sworn in as the 3rd (and as of now the last) Deputy Chief Minister on 24 October 1983 and held the post until the dissolution of the ministry.

The Ministry underwent periodic reshuffling in 1983 and 1986.

== Ministers ==
Key

- † — †
- [RES] — [RES]

Name	Office	Portfolio	Took Office	Left Office
K. Karunakaran	Chief Minister		24 May 1982	25 March 1987
C.H. Mohammed Koya	Deputy Chief Minister	Public Works	24 May 1982	28 September 1983 †
K. Avukaderkutty Naha	Deputy Chief Minister		24 October 1983	25 March 1987
K. K. Balakrishnan	Minister	Transport	24 May 1982	29 August 1983 [RES]
N Sundaran Nadar	Minister	Transport	1 September 1983	25 March 1987
M. P. Gangadharan	Minister	Irrigation	24 May 1982	12 March 1986 [RES]
C.V. Padmarajan	Minister	Community Development	24 May 1982	29 August 1983 [RES]
P.K. Velayudhan	Minister	Community Development	1 September 1983	25 March 1987
P. Cyriac John	Minister	Agriculture	24 May 1982	29 August 1983 [RES]
A.L. Jacob	Minister	Agriculture	1 September 1983	25 March 1987
K. P. Nooruddin	Minister	Forests	24 May 1982	25 March 1987
Vayalar Ravi	Minister	Home Affairs	24 May 1982	24 May 1986 [RES]
E. Ahamed	Minister	Industries	24 May 1982	25 March 1987
U.A. Beeran	Minister	Food and Civil Supplies	24 May 1982	25 March 1987
T.M. Jacob	Minister	Education	24 May 1982	25 March 1987
P.J. Joseph	Minister	Revenue	24 May 1982	25 March 1987
R. Balakrishna Pillai	Minister	Electricity	24 May 1982	5 June 1985 [RES]
R. Balakrishna Pillai	Minister	Electricity	25 May 1986	25 March 1987
K. M. Mani	Minister	Finance and Law	24 May 1982	25 March 1987
Thachady Prabhakaran	Minister	Finance	5 June 1986	5 March 1987 [RES]
M. Kamalam	Minister	Co-operation	24 May 1982	25 March 1987
K.G.R. Kartha	Minister	Health	24 May 1982	29 August 1983 [RES]
K.P. Ramachandran Nair	Minister	Health	1 September 1983	29 May 1985 [RES]
N. Sreenivasan	Minister	Excise	24 May 1982	25 March 1987
K. Sivadasan	Minister	Labour	24 May 1982	25 March 1987
C.M. Sundaram	Minister	Local Administration and Revenue	24 May 1982	25 March 1987
Ramesh Chennithala	Minister	Rural Development	5 June 1986	25 March 1987

== See also ==
- Chief Ministers of Kerala
- Kerala Ministers
