= First Karunakaran ministry =

1977 government of Kerala, India

First K. Karunakaran Ministry
- 7th Cabinet of Kerala
- 1977
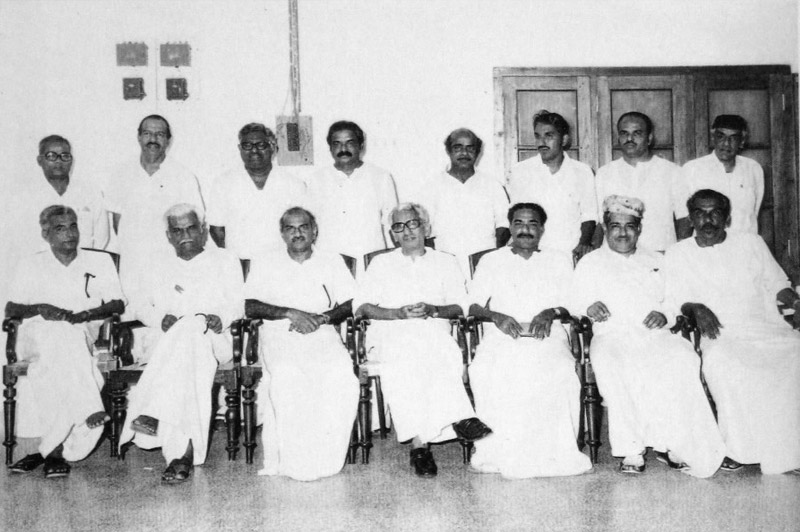
- First Karunakaran Ministry in 1977
- Date formed: 25 March 1977
- Date dissolved: 25 April 1977

People and organisations
- Head of government: K. Karunakaran
- Member parties: United Front
- Status in legislature: Majority
- Opposition party: Communist Party of India (Marxist)
- Opposition leader: E. M. S. Namboodiripad

History
- Election: 1977
- Predecessor: Second Achutha Menon Ministry
- Successor: First Antony ministry

The Fifth Kerala Legislative Assembly Council of Ministers in K. Karunakaran's first ministry, was a Kerala Council of Ministers (Kerala Cabinet), the executive wing of Kerala state government, led by Indian National Congress leader K. Karunakaran from 25 March 1977 to 25 April 1977. It comprised 15 ministers, all belonging to the United Front.

K. Karunakaran took charge as the Chief Minister of Kerala on 25 March 1977 following a stupendous win in the assembly elections, in which the United Front, led by the Indian National Congress won a record 111 seats. However, he was compelled to demit his office, exactly one month later on 25 April 1977, following certain references by the Kerala High Court in the Rajan case. during his tenure as the Home Minister under his predecessor, C. Achutha Menon.

Subsequently, A. K. Antony was sworn in as the new Chief Minister.

== Ministers ==
	Minister	Party	Constituency	Ministry/Portfolio
1	K. Karunakaran	Indian National Congress	Mala	Chief Minister
2	K. K. Balakrishnan	Indian National Congress	Chelakara	Minister for Harijan Welfare and Irrigation
3	M. K. Hemachandran	Indian National Congress	Aranmula	Minister for Finance
4	Oommen Chandy	Indian National Congress	Puthuppally	Minister for Labour
5	K. Sankaranarayanan	Indian National Congress	Thrithala	Minister for Agriculture
6	K. M. Mani	Kerala Congress	Pala	Minister for Home Affairs
7	K. Narayana Kurup	Kerala Congress	Vazhoor	Minister for Transport
8	E. John Jacob	Kerala Congress	Thiruvalla	Minister for Food and Civil Supplies
9	K. Avukaderkutty Naha	Indian Union Muslim League	Tirurangadi	Minister for Local Administration
10	C. H. Mohammed Koya	Indian Union Muslim League	Malappuram	Minister for Education
11	P. K. Vasudevan Nair	Communist Party of India	Alleppey	Minister for Industries
12	J. Chitharanjan	Communist Party of India	Chathanoor	Minister for Public Health
13	K. Kunhambu	Indian National Congress	Nadapuram	Minister for Forests
14	Baby John	Revolutionary Socialist Party (India)	Chavara	Minister for Revenue
15	K. Pankajakshan	Revolutionary Socialist Party (India)	Trivandrum West	Minister for Public Works
