= M. A. Kuttappan =

Indian politician (1947–2023)

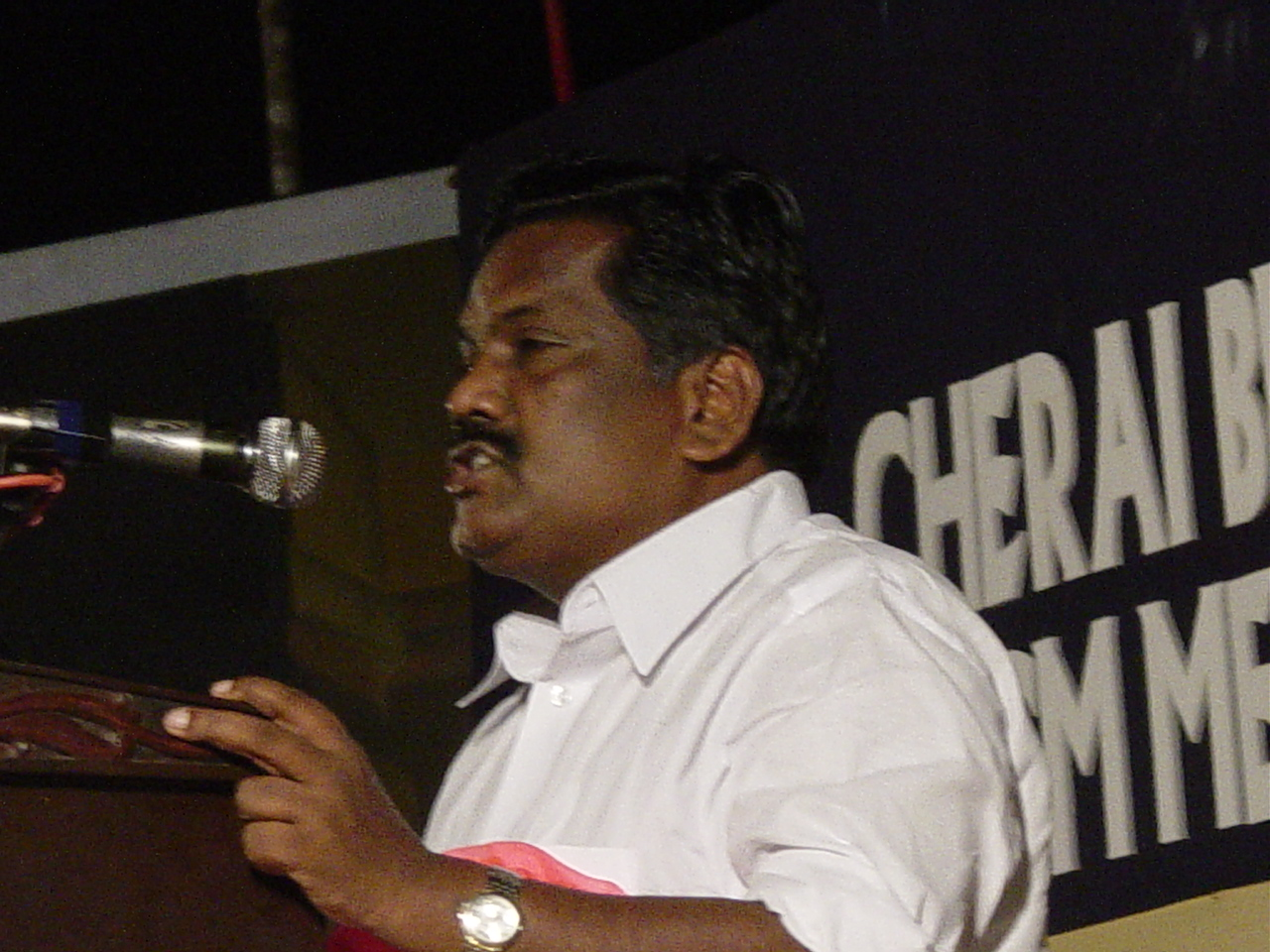

Minister for Welfare of Scheduled Castes, Scheduled Tribes and Backward Classes
- In office 26 May 2001 – 29 August 2004
- Preceded by: K. Radhakrishnan
- Succeeded by: A.P. Anil Kumar

Member of the Legislative Assembly
- In office 1980–1982
- Preceded by: Vella Eacharan
- Constituency: Wandoor constituency
- In office 1987–1991
- Preceded by: K. K. Balakrishnan
- Constituency: Chelakkara constituency
- In office 1996–2001
- Constituency: Njarakkal constituency
- In office 2001–2006
- Constituency: Njarakkal constituency

Personal details
- Born: 12 April 1947 Mallappally, Pathanamthitta district, Kerala
- Died: 20 June 2023 (aged 76) Kochi, Eranakulam district, Kerala
- Party: Indian National Congress
- Spouse: Beeby John
- Children: 2
- As of 9 August, 2023 Source: stateofkerala

M. Ayyappan Kuttappan (12 April 1947 – 20 June 2023) was an Indian National Congress politician from Kerala, India. Elected as Member of the Legislative Assembly four times, he also served as the Minister for Welfare of Scheduled Castes, Scheduled Tribes and Backward Classes in the Third Antony ministry from 2001 to 2004 and as the Chief Whip of the Congress in the 10th Kerala Assembly.

== Biography ==
Kuttappan was born on 12 April 1947, to Ayyappan and Kalyani in a Dalit family in Valakkuzhy, Mallappalli Taluk in present-day Pathanamthitta District of Kerala. He received his MBBS from Kottayam Medical College in 1977 and his MS from Thiruvananthapuram Medical College in 1979.

Before joining politics, he served as a tutor in pediatric surgery from 1973 to 1975 in Government T D Medical College, Alappuzha, for five years from 1975 to 1980 as an assistant surgeon in the Kerala health services department and four years as a medical officer in the Cochin Port Trust Hospital, from 1983 to 1987.

He has also served as a member of the Khadi and Village Industries Commission, a member of the Southern Railway Recruitment Board, a member of the Calicut University Senate and a member of the KPCC Executive Committee.

=== Personal life and death ===
Kuttappan and his wife Beeby John have two sons. After leaving Pathanamthitta, he lived with his family in Saket, Nivya Nagar, Perandur in Ernakulam district. He died on 20 June 2023, in a private hospital in Kochi.

== Political career ==
Kuttappan got attracted to mainstream politics and became active in organizational activities while serving as house surgeon at Ernakulam General Hospital from Kottayam Medical College. He then resigned from the job to pursue full-time political activity. Kuttappan joined the Indian National Congress in 1978 through the Congress Reform Committee.

In 1980, Kuttappan was first elected to the Kerala Legislative Assembly from Wandur constituency. He was then elected as MLA from Chelakara in 1987 and from Njarakkal in 1996 and 2001. From May 2001 to August 2004, he served as the Minister for Welfare of Scheduled Castes, Scheduled Tribes and Backward Classes in the A. K. Antony cabinet.

Kuttappan was one of the members of A (led by A. K. Antony) group in Congress politics. The fight between the A and I (named after Indira Gandhi, led by Karunakaran) groups intensified and Oommen Chandy resigned from Karunakaran's cabinet because Kuttappan was denied Rajya Sabha seat on behalf of the group politics. Kuttappan, who was in the cabinet when Antony became the chief minister, lost his ministerial post when Oommen Chandy became the chief minister. It is believed that he lost his candidature in Njarakkal due to his later joining the I group.

In 2013, he suffered a stroke during the MA John memorial speech at Kuryanadu and following that he retired from political life due to ill health. Although he almost recovered his health through treatment, he did not enter active politics after that.
