= 1980 Kerala Legislative Assembly election =

1980 Kerala state assembly election
- 3 and 5 January 1980

All 140 seats in the Kerala Legislative Assembly 71 seats needed for a majority
- Turnout: 72.23% (▼6.96%)
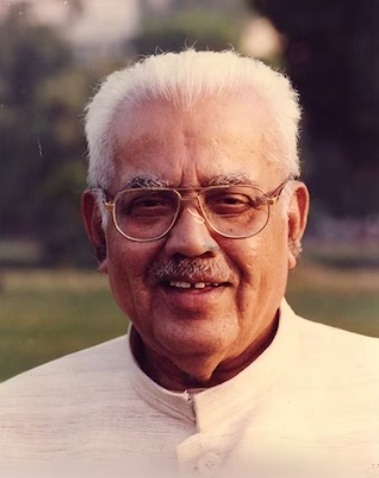

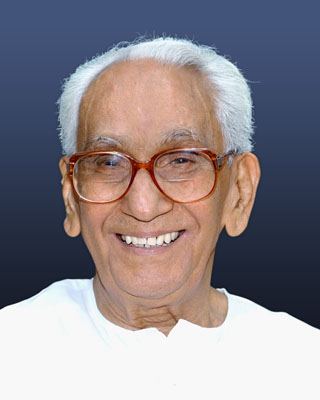
	First party	Second party
Leader	E. K. Nayanar	K. Karunakaran
Party	CPI(M)	INC
Alliance	LDF	UDF
Leader's seat	Malampuzha	Nemom; Mala
Last election	17	38
Seats won	35	17
Seat change	▲18	▼21
- Kerala, India; Kerala, one of the states in South India, has an electorate of more than 21 million people.

- Alliance wise structure
Chief Minister before election
President's Rule
Elected Chief Minister
E. K. Nayanar
CPI(M)

Elections were held on 1980 January 3 and 5 to elect members to the sixth Niyamasabha. This election saw the formation of two pre-poll alliances; LDF and UDF, most of whose constituent parties were part of the erstwhile United Front. CPI(M)-led LDF to win the election, after winning 98 seats altogether. E. K. Nayanar was sworn in as the Chief Minister on 26 March 1980.

== History ==
The Congress party had split into two splinter parties, the INC (I) and the INC (U). Kerala Congress too underwent a split, with the formation of KC (M) and the KC (J). The ML (O) assumed the name AIML. The United Front which won the 1977 election, had dissolved in 1979 which lead to the creation of two long-running alliance formula in the state:

- The United Democratic Front (UDF) consisting of the INC (I), the IUML, the KC (J), the PSP, the NDP, and the SRP
- The Left Democratic Front (LDF) comprising, the CPM, the CPI, the INC (U), the KC (M), the KC (PG), the AIML, and the RSP

== Results ==
=== Party Wise Results ===
Party Wise Results
Party	Seats	Alliance
Communist Party of Indian (Marxist) (CPI(M))	35	Left Democratic Front
Indian National Congress (U) (INC(U))	21	Left Democratic Front
Communist Party of India (CPI)	17	Left Democratic Front
Kerala Congress (M) (KCM)	8	Left Democratic Front
Revolutionary Socialist Party (RSP)	6	Left Democratic Front
All India Muslim League (AIMUL)	5	Left Democratic Front
Janata Party (JNP)	5	Left Democratic Front
Kerala Congress (Pillai Group) (KCP)	1	Left Democratic Front
Indian National Congress (I) (INC (I))	17	United Democratic Front
Indian Union Muslim League (IUML)	14	United Democratic Front
Kerala Congress (J) (KEC)	6	United Democratic Front
National Democratic Party (NDP) (Note: The members of the PSP and NDP were elected as independent candidates.)	3	United Democratic Front
Praja Socialist Party (PSP)	1	United Democratic Front
Independent (IND)	1	N/A
Total	140	

=== Constituency Wise Results ===
Constituency		Winner				Runner Up				Margin	%
#	Name	Candidate	Party	Votes	%	Candidate	Party	Votes	%	Margin	%
1	Manjeswar	Dr. A. Subba Rao	CPI	20,816	39.34	Chorkalam Abdullah	IUML	20,660	39.04	156	0.30
2	Kasaragod	C. T. Ahamedali	IUML	30,793	59.91	Gorvacis Areeckal	KEC	14,113	27.46	16,680	32.45
3	Udma	K. Purushothaman	CPI(M)	31,948	46.25	N. K. Balakrishnan	IND	26,928	38.99	5,020	7.26
4	Hosdrug (SC)	K. T. Kumaran	CPI	42,136	56.81	T. Kumaran Master	INC(I)	32,031	43.19	10,105	13.62
5	Trikkarpur	P. Karunakaran	CPI(M)	47,643	59.10	K. P. Kunhikannan	INC(I)	32,026	39.73	15,617	19.37
6	Irikkur	Ram Chandran Kacannoppally	INC(U)	37,440	53.38	Dr. K. C. Joseph	KC(J)	31,992	45.61	5,448	7.77
7	Payyannur	N. Subrammaniya Shenoy	CPI(M)	46,351	61.93	T. V. Koran	IND	26,939	35.99	19,412	25.94
8	Taliparamba	C. P. Moossan Kutty	CPI(M)	47,420	59.27	Chandren T. P.	IND	30,829	38.53	16,591	20.74
9	Azhicode	P. Devooty	CPI(M)	38,985	60.96	T. V. Narayanan	INC(I)	24,502	38.31	14,483	22.65
10	Cannanore	P. Bhaskaran	JP	35,565	49.84	O. Bharathan	CPI(M)	35,216	49.35	349	0.49
11	Edakkad	P. P. V. Moosa	AIML	39,843	56.37	K. Sudhakaran	JP	29,886	42.28	9,957	14.09
12	Tellicherry	M. V. Rajagopalan	CPI(M)	42,673	61.71	V. P. Marakikar	INC(I)	25,971	37.56	16,702	24.15
13	Peringalam	A. K. Saseendran	INC(U)	38,049	53.55	K. C. Marar	JP	32,159	45.26	5,890	8.29
14	Kuthuparamba	N. V. Raghavan	CPI(M)	44,207	65.57	R. Karunakaran	IND	22,556	33.46	21,651	32.11
15	Peravoor	K. P. Noorudeen	INC(U)	45,486	59.18	C. M. Karunakaran Nambiar	INC(I)	31,370	40.82	14,116	18.36
16	North Wynad (ST)	M. V. Rajan Master	INC(I)	33,723	52.97	A. Gopalan	CPI(M)	29,940	47.03	3,783	5.94
17	Badagara	K. Chandra Sekharan	JP	41,684	50.83	P. V. Kunhikannan	CPI(M)	40,322	49.17	1,362	1.66
18	Nadapuram	K. T. Kanaran	CPI	42,680	53.60	Dr. K. G. Adiyedi	INC(I)	36,940	46.40	5,740	7.20
19	Meppayur	A. V. Abdulurahiman Haji	AIML	43,851	54.01	P. K. K. Bava	IUML	36,044	44.39	7,807	9.62
20	Quilandy	Manimangalath Kuttialy	INC(I)	42,171	51.74	P. K. Sankaran	CPI(M)	37,143	45.57	5,028	6.17
21	Perambra	V. V. Dakshinamoorthy	CPI(M)	44,695	55.92	K. A. Devassia	KC(J)	35,227	44.08	9,468	11.84
22	Balusseri	A. C. Shanmukhadas	INC(U)	39,664	56.36	P. K. Sankaran Kutty	JP	30,716	43.64	8,948	12.72
23	Koduvally	P. V. Mohammed	IUML	41,134	53.60	K. Moossakutty	CPI(M)	35,608	46.40	5,526	7.20
24	Calicut- I	N. Chandrasekhara Kurup	CPI(M)	41,796	52.20	K. T. Raghavan	INC(I)	38,011	47.47	3,785	4.73
25	Calicut- II	P. M. Abubackar	AIML	40,160	53.48	C. K. Nanu	JP	34,931	46.52	5,229	6.96
26	Beypore	N. P. Moideen	INC(U)	43,360	54.30	N. K. Abdulla Koya	IUML	36,052	45.15	7,308	9.15
27	Kunnamangalam (SC)	K. P. Raman	AIML	35,234	53.06	K. Gopalan	INC(I)	31,173	46.94	4,061	6.12
28	Thiruvambadi	Cryiac John	INC(U)	35,623	53.89	N. M. Hussain	IUML	29,953	45.31	5,670	8.58
29	Kalpetta	M. Kamalam	JP	37,442	59.44	K. Abdul Khader	RSP	24,403	38.74	13,039	20.70
30	Sultan's Battery	K. K. Ramachandran Master	INC(I)	36,974	54.97	P. T. Jose	KEC	29,580	43.97	7,394	11.00
31	Wandoor (SC)	M. A. Kuttappan	INC(I)	35,187	51.57	P. Suresh	INC(U)	29,298	42.94	5,889	8.63
32	Nilambur	C. Haridas	INC(U)	41,744	53.51	T. K. Hamsa	INC(I)	35,321	45.28	6,423	8.23
33	Manjeri	C. H. Mohamed Koya	IUML	43,209	65.39	Aboobacker Kunikkal	AIML	21,905	33.15	21,304	32.24
34	Malappuram	U. A. Beeran	IUML	36,602	67.94	Muthukoya Thangal	AIML	17,272	32.06	19,330	35.88
35	Kondotty	P. Seethi Haji	IUML	41,848	60.00	M. C. Mohamed	AIML	26,650	38.21	15,198	21.79
36	Tirurangadi	Avukkaderkutty Maha	IUML	37,775	57.65	K. Koyakunhi Naha	CPI	25,816	39.40	11,959	18.25
37	Tanur	E. Ahmmed	IUML	38,998	71.87	U. K. Bhasy	INC(U)	15,265	28.13	23,733	43.74
38	Tirur	P. T. Kunhi Mohammed	IUML	38,469	51.52	Mohammed S/O Abdu	AIML	36,201	48.48	2,268	3.04
39	Ponnani	K. Sreedharan	CPI(M)	38,791	50.82	P. T. Kohanakrishnan	INC(I)	36,475	47.79	2,316	3.03
40	Kuttippuram	Korambayil Ahammed Haji	IUML	33,863	68.32	P. V. S. Musthafa Thangal	AIML	15,703	31.68	18,160	36.64
41	Mankada	K. P. Majeed	IUML	35,623	52.79	Abu Haji K.	AIML	31,861	47.21	3,762	5.58
42	Perinthalmanna	Nalakath Sooppy	IUML	37,203	52.78	Paloli Mohammed Kutty	CPI(M)	33,289	47.22	3,914	5.56
43	Thrithala (SC)	M. P. Thami	INC(I)	30,214	50.52	N. Subbayyan	INC(U)	29,595	49.48	619	1.04
44	Pattambi	M. P. Gangadharan	INC(I)	31,570	52.42	E. P. Gopalan	CPI	28,119	46.69	3,451	5.73
45	Ottapalam	V. C. Kabeer	INC(U)	23,683	50.18	P. R. Nambiar	JP	20,499	43.43	3,184	6.75
46	Sreekrishnapuram	K. Sankaranarayanan	INC(I)	33,532	49.08	M. P. Kunju	CPI(M)	33,114	48.46	418	0.62
47	Mannarkkad	A. P. Hamza	IUML	30,091	49.58	A. N. Yusuf	CPI	28,703	47.30	1,388	2.28
48	Malampuzha	E. K. Nayanar	CPI(M)	35,333	61.62	K. Rajan	JP	19,776	34.49	15,557	27.13
49	Palghat	C. M. Sundaram	IND	35,902	57.09	K. A. Chandran	INC(U)	25,695	40.86	10,207	16.23
50	Chittur	K. Krishnankutty	JP	23,882	38.61	P. Sankar	CPI	23,578	38.12	304	0.49
51	Kollengode	C. Vasudeva Menon	CPI(M)	36,688	50.42	A. Sunna Sahib	INC(I)	34,156	46.94	2,532	3.48
52	Coyalmannam (SC)	T. K. Arumughan	CPI(M)	34,530	54.08	V. Mani	INC(I)	28,210	44.19	6,320	9.89
53	Alathur	C. T. Krishnan	CPI(M)	36,244	54.13	K. P. Kaladharan	IND	30,262	45.19	5,982	8.94
54	Chelakara (SC)	K. K. Balakrishnan	INC(I)	32,024	50.41	K. S. Sankaran	CPI(M)	30,899	48.64	1,125	1.77
55	Wadakkancherry	K. S. Narayanan Namboodri	INC(I)	34,658	50.82	A. Padmanabhan	CPI(M)	32,391	47.50	2,267	3.32
56	Kunnamkulam	K. P. Viswanathan	INC(U)	33,127	55.89	N. Madhavan	IND	16,421	27.71	16,706	28.18
57	Cherpu	K. P. Prabhakaran	CPI	35,973	54.49	Therambil Ramakrishnan	IND	29,253	44.31	6,720	10.18
58	Trichur	M. K. Kannan	CPI(M)	32,296	51.36	K. J. George	JP	28,872	45.91	3,424	5.45
59	Ollur	Raghavan Poshakadavil	INC(I)	32,302	49.31	Francis P. R.	INC(U)	32,277	49.27	25	0.04
60	Kodakara	Lonappan Nambadan	KEC	29,023	44.31	V. L. Lonappan	INC(I)	24,503	37.41	4,520	6.90
61	Chalakudi	P. K. Ittoop	KEC	30,786	48.03	P. A. Thomas	INC(I)	30,657	47.83	129	0.20
62	Mala	K. Karunakaran	INC(I)	35,964	51.78	Paul Kokkat	CPI(M)	32,562	46.88	3,402	4.90
63	Irinjalakuda	Joes Thanickal	INC(U)	36,086	55.07	A. P. George	JP	28,396	43.33	7,690	11.74
64	Manalur	V. M. Sudheeran	INC(U)	35,551	56.28	N. I. Devassikutty	INC(I)	27,619	43.72	7,932	12.56
65	Guruvayoor	B. V. Seethi Thangal	IUML	30,176	50.96	C. K. Kumaran	CPI(M)	28,424	48.00	1,752	2.96
66	Nattika	P. K. Gopalakrishnan	CPI	31,463	52.85	K. Moidu	JP	26,900	45.18	4,563	7.67
67	Kodungallur	V. K. Rajan	CPI	35,567	51.67	Kollickatharan Ravi	IND	33,047	48.01	2,520	3.66
68	Ankamali	A. P. Kurrian	CPI(M)	40,565	49.89	P. J. Joy	JP	38,759	47.66	1,806	2.23
69	Vadakkekara	T. K. Abdu	CPI(M)	38,387	59.03	P. N. Sukumaran Nair	JP	26,640	40.97	11,747	18.06
70	Parur	A. C. Jose	INC(U)	31,246	51.34	K. P. George	IND	26,761	43.97	4,485	7.37
71	Narakal (SC)	M. K. Krishnan	CPI(M)	34,932	51.65	T. K. C. Vaduthala	IND	31,959	47.25	2,973	4.40
72	Ernakulam	A. L. Jacob	INC(I)	36,668	49.86	K. N. Ravindranath	CPI(M)	36,091	49.07	577	0.79
73	Mattancherry	M. J. Zakaria	AIML	26,543	50.30	A. S. Abdulrahiman	JP	24,757	46.92	1,786	3.38
74	Palluruthy	T. P. Peethambaran Master	INC(U)	40,879	53.07	T. T. Mathew	KC(J)	33,663	43.70	7,216	9.37
75	Thrippunithura	T. K. Ramakrishnan	CPI(M)	44,813	55.91	H. N. Velayudhan Nair	IND	34,720	43.32	10,093	12.59
76	Alwaye	K. Mohammed Ali	INC(U)	46,291	52.38	T. H. Mustaffa	INC(I)	39,962	45.22	6,329	7.16
77	Perumbavoor	P. R. Sivan	CPI(M)	40,525	53.53	Kochunny Master A. A.	INC(I)	33,455	44.19	7,070	9.34
78	Kunnathunad	P. P. Esthose	CPI(M)	36,460	49.43	P. P. Thankachan	INC(I)	36,027	48.85	433	0.58
79	Piravom	P. C. Chaeko	INC(U)	38,659	52.14	C. Paulose	IND	35,408	47.75	3,251	4.39
80	Muvattupuzha	V. Joseph	KC(J)	37,044	51.63	Johny Nelloor Varkey	KEC	33,523	46.72	3,521	4.91
81	Kothamangalam	T. M. Jacob	KC(J)	40,356	54.74	M. V. Mani	KEC	32,843	44.55	7,513	10.19
82	Thodupuzha	P. J. Joseph	KC(J)	43,410	55.80	Kusuman Joseph	INC(U)	33,093	42.54	10,317	13.26
83	Devicolam (SC)	G. Varadan	CPI(M)	36,346	62.24	P. A. Prakash	IND	19,951	34.17	16,395	28.07
84	Idukki	Jose Kuttyani	INC(I)	33,367	52.40	V. T. Sebastian	KEC	28,838	45.29	4,529	7.11
85	Udumbanchola	Thomas Joseph	KEC	38,417	51.50	Pachady Sreedaran	IND	33,030	44.28	5,387	7.22
86	Peermade	C. A. Kurian	CPI	34,795	51.55	Michaal Manarkattu	INC(I)	31,444	46.58	3,351	4.97
87	Kanjirappally	Thomas Kallampally	KEC	33,172	50.14	Joseph Varanam	KC(J)	31,167	47.10	2,005	3.04
88	Vazhoor	M. K. Joseph	KEC	27,819	46.83	P. S. John	INC(I)	16,377	27.57	11,442	19.26
89	Changanacherry	C. P. Thomas	KEC	37,041	51.84	K. J. Chacko	KC(J)	34,408	48.16	2,633	3.68
90	Kottayam	K. M. Abraham	CPI(M)	37,588	56.08	P. B. R. Pillai	JP	25,624	38.23	11,964	17.85
91	Ettumanoor	Vaikom Viswan	CPI(M)	34,239	49.27	George Joseph Podipara	IND	33,865	48.73	374	0.54
92	Puthuppally	Oommen Chandy	INC(U)	38,612	59.21	M. R. G. Panicker	IND	24,953	38.26	13,659	20.95
93	Poonjar	P. C. George	KC(J)	25,806	43.70	V. J. Joseph	KEC	24,658	41.76	1,148	1.94
94	Palai	K. N. Mani	KEC	38,739	52.71	M. M. Jacob	INC(I)	34,173	46.50	4,566	6.21
95	Kaduthuruthy	O. Lukose	KEC	32,863	49.02	E. J. Lukose	KC(J)	31,577	47.10	1,286	1.92
96	Vaikom (SC)	M. K. Kesavan	CPI	40,590	58.78	(Edavattom) Gopalan	IND	28,098	40.69	12,492	18.09
97	Aroor	K. R. Gouri	CPI(M)	44,219	57.32	T. K. Sadanandan Kunjan	INC(I)	31,855	41.29	12,364	16.03
98	Sherthalai	P. S. Sreenivasan	CPI	38,613	57.11	Joseph Mathan	JP	27,200	40.23	11,413	16.88
99	Mararikulam	A. V. Thamarakshan	RSP	45,714	55.50	Raju Gangadharan	IND	35,885	43.56	9,829	11.94
100	Alleppey	P. K. Vasudevan Nair	CPI	34,786	49.92	K. P. Ramchandran Nair	IND	33,783	48.48	1,003	1.44
101	Ambalapuzha	P. K. Chandranandan	CPI(M)	36,009	52.27	V. Dinakaran	IND	32,884	47.73	3,125	4.54
102	Kuttanad	Ooman Mathew	KC(J)	37,346	52.77	K. P. Joseph	CPI(M)	33,256	46.99	4,090	5.78
103	Haripad	C. B. Warrier	CPI(M)	41,514	51.03	G. P. Mangalathu Madem	INC(I)	38,105	46.84	3,409	4.19
104	Kayamkulam	Thachedy Prabhakaran	INC(U)	41,320	58.17	Thundathil Kunjukrishna Pillai	INC(I)	29,718	41.83	11,602	16.34
105	Thiruvalla	P. C. Thomas	JP	29,485	50.52	Varghese Karippavil	KC(B)	28,285	48.47	1,200	2.05
106	Kallooppara	K. A. Mathew	KC(J)	29,399	52.05	C. A. Mathew	KEC	24,261	42.95	5,138	9.10
107	Aranmula	K. K. Sreenivasan	INC(I)	30,227	50.84	Thoppil Ravi	INC(U)	27,121	45.62	3,106	5.22
108	Chengannur	K. R. Saraswathi Amma	IND	35,910	52.02	Thomas Kuthiravattom	KEC	31,610	45.79	4,300	6.23
109	Mavelikara	S. Govinda Kurup	CPI(M)	37,990	52.99	N. Bhaskaran Nair	IND	32,063	44.72	5,927	8.27
110	Pandalam (SC)	P. K. Velayudhan	INC(U)	39,890	52.76	P. S. Rajan	INC(I)	32,376	42.82	7,514	9.94
111	Ranni	M. C. Cherian	INC(U)	31,243	49.54	Sunny Panavelil	INC(I)	30,097	47.72	1,146	1.82
112	Pathanamthitta	K. K. Nair	IND	27,549	40.19	Eapan Varughese	KC(J)	25,566	37.30	1,983	2.89
113	Konni	V. S. Chandra Sekhar Pillai	CPI(M)	33,107	50.38	G. Gopinadhan Nair	INC(U)	31,054	47.25	2,053	3.13
114	Pathanapuram	E. K. Pillai	CPI	37,527	55.09	Bava Sahib	IND	28,328	41.59	9,199	13.50
115	Punaloor	P. K. Sreenivasan	CPI	36,133	50.38	Sam Oommen Oommen	KC(J)	33,920	47.29	2,213	3.09
116	Chadayamangalam	E. Chandrasekharan Nair	CPI	33,991	58.59	Valiyaveedan Md. Kunju	IUML	23,107	39.83	10,884	18.76
117	Kottarakara	R. Balakrishna Pillai	KC(B)	48,473	74.16	Thevannoor Sreedharan Nair	IND	11,762	18.00	36,711	56.16
118	Neduvathur (SC)	C. K. Thankappan	CPI(M)	35,041	54.04	M. R. Kottara	INC(I)	28,784	44.39	6,257	9.65
119	Adoor	C. P. Karunakaran Pillai	CPI(M)	31,639	51.11	Thennala Balakrishna Pillai	INC(I)	28,326	45.76	3,313	5.35
120	Kunnathur (SC)	Kallada Narayanan	RSP	40,582	55.75	Kottakkuzhy Sukumaran	JP	29,686	40.78	10,896	14.97
121	Karunagapally	B. M. Sheriff	CPI	35,831	50.74	T. V. Vijayarajan	IND	33,842	47.92	1,989	2.82
122	Chavara	Baby John	RSP	41,448	59.98	C. Rajendran	JP	24,835	35.94	16,613	24.04
123	Kundara	V. V. Joseph	CPI(M)	39,690	58.13	V. Sankara Narayana Pillai	INC(I)	27,319	40.01	12,371	18.12
124	Quilon	K. Sivadasan	RSP	35,749	50.91	C. V. Padmarajan	INC(I)	33,335	47.47	2,414	3.44
125	Eravipuram	R. S. Unni	RSP	45,281	57.65	A. Yunus Kunju	IUML	31,712	40.37	13,569	17.28
126	Chathanoor	J. Chitharanjan	CPI	34,037	50.15	Varinjam Vasu Pillai	JP	28,670	42.24	5,367	7.91
127	Varkala	Varkala Radhakrishan	CPI(M)	34,148	55.45	G. Karthikeyan	INC(I)	26,887	43.66	7,261	11.79
128	Attingal	Vakkom Purushothaman	INC(U)	35,634	59.14	Vakkom Devarajan	IND	22,561	37.45	13,073	21.69
129	Kilimanoor (SC)	Bhargavi Thankappan	CPI	36,513	68.88	V. K. Ram	JP	14,761	27.85	21,752	41.03
130	Vamanapuram	Koliyakode N. Krishnan Nair	CPI(M)	38,333	57.18	A. Nafeesath Beevi	INC(I)	26,273	39.19	12,060	17.99
131	Ariyanad	K. Pankajakshan	RSP	29,108	50.70	Charupara Ravi	JP	27,822	48.46	1,286	2.24
132	Nedumangad	K. V. Surendranath	CPI	33,919	52.24	P. Chandrasekharan Nair	IND	27,619	42.53	6,300	9.71
133	Kazhakuttam	N. M. Hassan	INC(U)	35,739	50.89	Lakshmanen Vaidyan	INC(I)	32,939	46.90	2,800	3.99
134	Trivandrum North	K. Anirudhan	CPI(M)	36,460	50.29	R. Sundaresan Nair	JP	34,200	47.17	2,260	3.12
135	Trivandrum West	P. A. Mohemmed Kannu	IUML	31,490	49.27	K. C. Vamadevan	RSP	26,231	41.04	5,259	8.23
136	Trivandrum East	C. S. Neelakantan Nair	IND	33,519	49.49	K. Sankaranarayana Pillai	INC(U)	32,734	48.33	785	1.16
137	Nemom	E. Ramesan Nair	INC(I)	37,589	54.59	S. Varaderajan Nair	INC(U)	30,312	44.02	7,277	10.57
138	Kovalam	M. R. Raghu Chandra Bal	INC(I)	40,047	54.53	V. Thankayyan	CPI	32,526	44.29	7,521	10.24
139	Neyyattinkara	R. Sundaresan Nair	IND	39,975	56.52	R. Parameswaran Pillai	CPI(M)	30,331	42.89	9,644	13.63
140	Parassala	N. Sundaran Nadar	INC(I)	40,680	60.90	M. Sathynesan	CPI(M)	26,121	39.10	14,559	21.80

== Aftermath ==
=== Formation of Ministry ===
On 25 January 1980, a 17 member ministry headed by E.K. Nayanar of CPI(M) was sworn in, revoking President's rule.

=== Withdrawal of support ===
Despite the thumping majority for the LDF in the Assembly, the Nayanar government’s majority depended on the support of 21 members of the Congress (U), led by A. K. Antony, as well as eight members of the Mani faction of the Kerala Congress. Both of these factions had trouble with the CPI (M) style of rule, and withdrew their support on 16 October 1981, leading to Nayanar’s resignation 4 days later.

=== Formation of new government ===
Following two months of uncertainty, Congress (S) decided to support Congress (Indira), and an eight-member ministry was formed on 28 December 1981, with K. Karunakaran, of Indira-Congress, at the helm. It was the twelfth ministry in Kerala. However Karunakaran couldn’t build a comfortable majority either, as troubles began to rise as the Congress (S) split into two factions, 16 members joining the Antony group and six remaining as members of the Chacko group, along with a split in Janata Party.

With these shifts, the Assembly was divided exactly down the middle, with the ruling front of the Congress and the CPI (M)-led Opposition both having 70 MLAs each. The only vote that shifted the balance was Speaker A. C. Jose’s. His casting vote, exercised eight times, was the only thing that kept the Karunakaran government in power for nearly three months.

The deadlock finally came to an end when Lonappan Nambadan, a founder-member of the Kerala Congress – then allied with the ruling United Democratic Front – voted against the government. On 17 March 1982, the Karunakaran government resigned and the Assembly was dissolved. The state came under President’s rule for the eighth time, forcing an interim election in 1982.
