= P. K. Velayudhan =

Indian politician

Minister for Community Development
- In office 1 September 1983 – 25 March 1987
- Constituency: Pandalam and Njarakkal

Personal details
- Born: 4 September 1946
- Died: 25 May 2003 (aged 56)
- Party: Communist Party of India (Marxist)

P. K. Velayudhan was the Minister for Community Development in third K. Karunakaran Ministry in Keralam.

He was born to Kunjayyappan on 4 September 1946. He married P.V. Girija.

== Political life ==
P. K. Velayudhan was the prominent Dalit leader of Communist Party of India (Marxist) in Keralam. He was the State President of Bharatiya Depressed Class League. He was the General Secretary of the Keralam State Committee of Bharatiya Depressed Class League. He was the State President of Harijan Youth League, State Harijan Students League. He was a member of State Harijan Advisory Committee. He was part of the Youth Congress State Executive as well.

Velayudhan was a member of Kerala Pradesh Congress Committee. He was a member of Keralam University Senate, and the President of Keralam Aquatic Association and KSRTC United Labour Organisation.

He was elected to Legislative Assembly of Keralam in 1980 from Pandalam State Assembly Constituency and later in 1982 from Njarakkal State Assembly Constituency. He was the Chairman of Committee on the Welfare of Scheduled Caste and Scheduled Tribe during 1980 to 1982.
