= Vella Eacharan =

Indian politician (1918–1980)

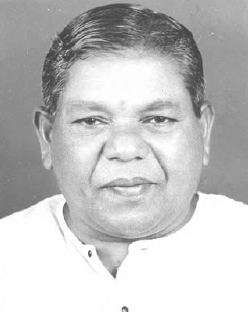

Minister for Irrigation, Devaswom, Harijan welfare, Community Development, Colonization & Settlement, Government of Kerala
- In office 4 September 1970 – 20 May 1977
- Governor: Venkata Viswanathan; N. N. Wanchoo
- Chief Minister: C. Achutha Menon
- Succeeded by: K. K. Balakrishnan

Member of the Kerala Legislative Assembly
- In office 1970–1977
- Succeeded by: M. A. Kuttappan
- Constituency: Thrithala
- In office 1977–1980
- Constituency: Wandoor

Personal details
- Born: July 9, 1918 Alathur
- Died: 11 February 1980 (aged 61)
- Spouse: Lakshmi
- Children: Rajamma, Saralabai, Mrinalini
- Education: Board Middle School Alathur; Board School Koilandy; Co-operative Institute, Madras

Vella Eacharan Iyyani (9 July 1918 – 11 February 1980) was an Indian politician from Palakkad, Kerala and a member of the Indian National Congress. He was one among the earliest Dalit leaders in Kerala.

Eacharan was elected to 1st Lok Sabha in 1952 from Ponnani Lok Sabha constituency and to 2nd Lok Sabha in 1957 from Palakkad Lok Sabha constituency. Eacharan was the Minister for Devaswom, Harijan welfare, Community Development, Colonization & Settlement (1971-1977). He was elected to Kerala Legislative Assembly from Thrithala in 1970 and Wandoor in 1977.

== Personal life ==
Vella Eacharan was born at Alathur on July 9, 1918, as the son of Vella and Velai. In 1943, he married Lekshmi and they have three daughters.

== Political life ==
After school education and co-operative training from Co-operative Institute, Madras, he was in Government service (Clerk in Civil Supplies) during 1943–1951. Later he resigned from his service and entered politics as an active worker of the INC. Actively involved in harijan upliftment and bhoodan work, Eacharan later served as a member of the 1st Lok Sabha at the age of 33 in the year 1952 and subsequently in the 2nd Lok Sabha.

Eacharan was elected as a member to the Kerala Legislative Assembly from Trithala constituency in 1970 and from Wandoor constituency in 1977.

Eacharan was the Minister for Devaswoms, Harijan Welfare, Community Development, Colonization and Settlement from 1971 to 1977, in the Ministry headed by C. Achutha Menon.

The initiative of special recruitment of the scheduled castes and scheduled tribes in Kerala public sector jobs was spearheaded by Eacharan in 1972.

During his tenure as Devaswom minister, Eacharan introduced bills like The Guruvayoor Devaswom Bill, 1971 and The Koodalmanickam Devaswom Bill, 1971 and The Travancore–Cochin Hindu Religious Institutions (Amendment) Bill,1974. Another major bill introduced by Vella Eacharan was the Bonded Labour System (Abolition) Bill, 1975. He was the Founder of Nayanar Memorial Harijan Hostel, Alathur.

He had also held several high positions in different walks of life including serving as

- Member of the Select Committee,

The Representation of the people (amendment) bill, 1958

- Member of the Joint Committee,

The Dowry Prohibition Bill, 1959

- Member, Estimates Committee, Lok Sabha (1961–62)
- President of Depressed Class League, Malabar
- All India (CWC) Congress Working Committee member
- All India Congress Committee (AICC) member
- Kerala Pradesh Congress Committee (KPCC) member
- Kerala Pradesh Congress Committee (KPCC) Vice-president
- AICC Advisory Committee Member - Cell to Look After the Problems of Scheduled Castes
- President of Palghat Harijan Sabha
- Organiser of Harijan Yuva Jana Vidyalayam
- Member of Indian Central Arecanut Committee as also its representative on the Indian Council of Agricultural Research (ICAR) and its Advisory Board
- Member of Area Committee, Hindu Religious and Charitable Endowments, North Malabar
- Member of Malabar Harijan Sewak Sangh.

== Death ==
Vella Eacharan succumbed to a heart attack on 11 February 1980, aged 61. The Kerala Legislative Assembly paid homage to him on 18 February 1980.
