= Kerala Samyukta Socialist Party =

The Kerala Samyukta Socialist Party was a political party in the Indian state of Kerala. The KSSP was founded in 1968, as the two Samyukta Socialist Party ministers in the Kerala state government, P. K. Kunju and P. R. Kurup refused to heed a decision by the national party leadership to resign from their ministerial posts. They broke away from the SSP and formed the KSSP. K. Chandrasekharan was the chairman of KSSP. In May 1969 the majority of KSSP reconstituted itself as the Indian Socialist Party.
