= K. K. Balakrishnan =

Indian politician (1927–2000)

K.K.Balakrishnan
- കെ.കെ.ബാലകൃഷ്ണന്‍
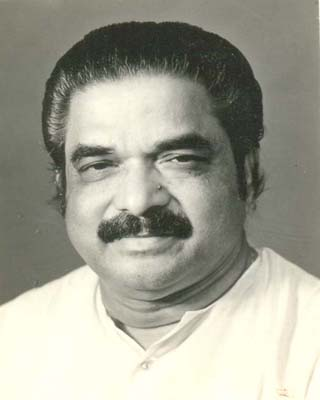

Minister for Harijan Welfare, Devaswoms and Irrigation, Kerala
- In office 11 April 1977 – 25 April 1977
- Chief Minister: K. Karunakaran
- Preceded by: Vella Eacharan
- Succeeded by: Himself

Minister for Harijan Welfare, Devaswoms and Irrigation, Kerala
- In office 27 April 1977 – 27 October 1977
- Chief Minister: A. K. Antony
- Portfolios: Harijan Welfare; Irrigation; Flood Control; Anti-sea Erosion; Devaswoms
- Preceded by: Himself
- Succeeded by: Damodaran Kalassery

Minister for Transport, Kerala
- In office 24 May 1982 – 29 August 1983
- Chief Minister: K. Karunakaran
- Preceded by: Lonappan Nambadan
- Succeeded by: N. Sundaran Nadar

Personal details
- Born: 20 June 1927 Nedupuzha, Trichur
- Died: 31 August 2000 (aged 73) Trichur, Kerala
- Cause of death: Heart attack
- Resting place: Nedupuzha, Trichur
- Party: Indian National Congress
- Spouse: P.C. Rugmini
- Children: Sheela, Renuka, Geetha, Sasi Kumar, Leena
- Parent(s): Karappakutty & Vallikutty
- Occupation: Politician

Shri. K. Karappakutty Balakrishnan (20 June 1927 – 31 August 2000), senior Congress leader, He was a minister in various governments led by K. Karunakaran and A. K. Antony. He represented Chalakkudy, Chelakkara, Thrithala constituencies in different Kerala Legislative Assemblies. He was a minister in the Government of Kerala, holding various portfolios including Irrigation, Transport, Devaswom and Harijan welfare.

== Early life ==
Shri. K.K. Balakrishnan, senior Congress leader, was born at Nedupuzha, in Trichur district on 20 June 1927 as the son of Shri. Karappakutty. He completed intermediate Course, and a Training Course in Khadi & Village Industries. Entering public life while a student, as a worker of the Indian National Congress.

The late Smt. P.C. Rugmini was his wife and they have one son and four daughters.

Shri.K.K Balakrishnan died on 31 August 2000. Kerala Legislative Assembly paid its homage to him on 21 December 2000.

== Political career ==
He started his political career at Indian National Congress, later became Executive member, KPCC, Member, AICC and Organising Secretary, Kerala INTUC.

Shri. Balakrishnan became elected to the Travancore – Cochin Legislative Assembly in 1954 and subsequently to the Second Kerala Legislative Assembly in 1960 from Chalakudy, as an INC candidate. In 1970, 1977 and 1980 he was elected from Chelakkara, in 1982 from Trithala and in 1991 from Vaikom constituency.

Shri Balakrishnan served as the Minister for Irrigation, Harijan Welfare a during 1977 –78, in the Ministries headed by Shri. K. Karunakaran and Shri. A.K. Antony. Later, from 24 May 1982 to 29 August 1983, he was the Minister for Transport, in the Ministry headed by Shri. K. Karunakaran.

== Positions held ==
- Chief Whip, Congress Legislature Party
- Convenor, Opposition Parties Joint Executive Committee
- Chairman, Committee on the Welfare of SC and ST during 1973–74, and 1979–81.
- General Secretary and later President, State Depressed class League
- Director, District Co-operative Bank, Trichur
- Member, Agricultural Production Committee,
- Member, Calicut University Senate.

== Assembly election candidature history ==
Year	Consultancy	Opponent	Result	Margin
1954	Thiru-Kochi	Data not available	Won	Data not available
1960	Chalakkudy		Won	164
1965	Chelakkara	C. K. Chakrapani	Won	106
1970	Chelakkara	N. K. Seshan	Won	1999
1977	Chelakkara	K. S. Sankaran	Won	9935
1980	Chelakkara	K. S. Sankaran	Won	1125
1982	Trithala	N. Subbayyan	Won	619
1991	Vaikom	K.P. Sreedharan	Won	1030
1996	Vaikom	M.K.Kesavan	Lost	9409

== See also ==
- Department of Devaswom, Government of Kerala

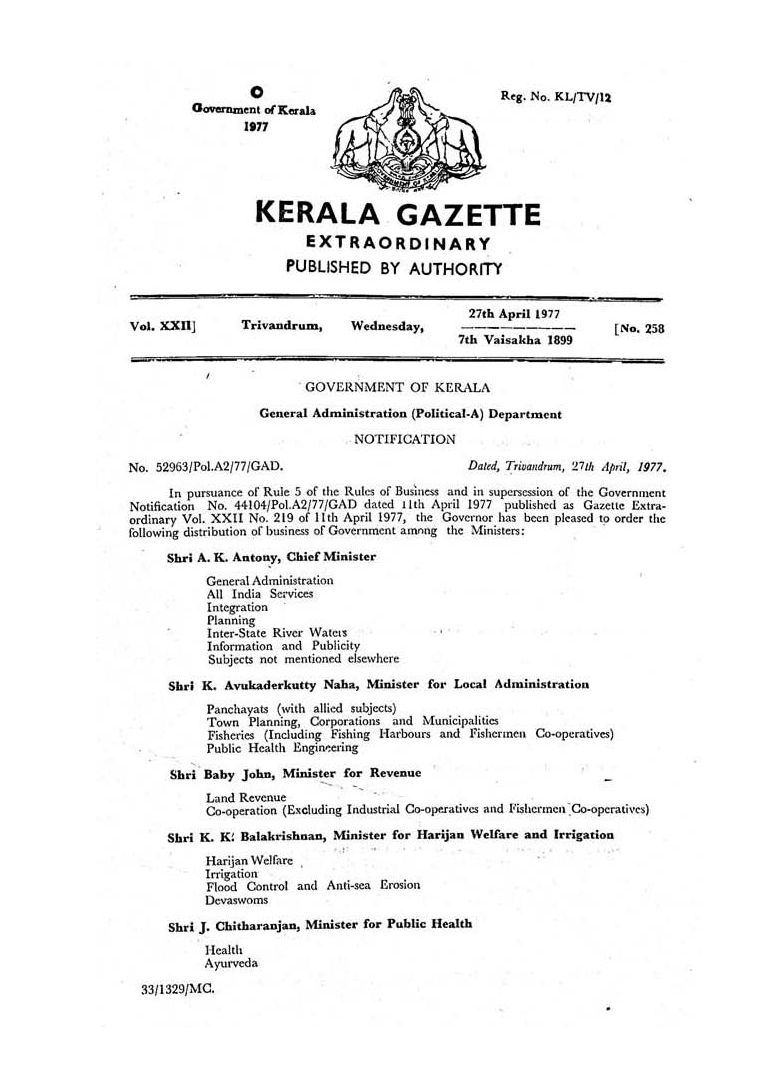
Kerala Gazette 1977 April 27 Volume: XXII, GazetteNumber:25, Kerala Gazette Notification by Kerala governor on 1977 April 27 ordering the distribution of the business of the Government among the ministers, including Shri. K.K Balakrishnan
