= K. T. Jacob =

Indian politician

- കെ.ടി. ജേക്കബ്ബ്
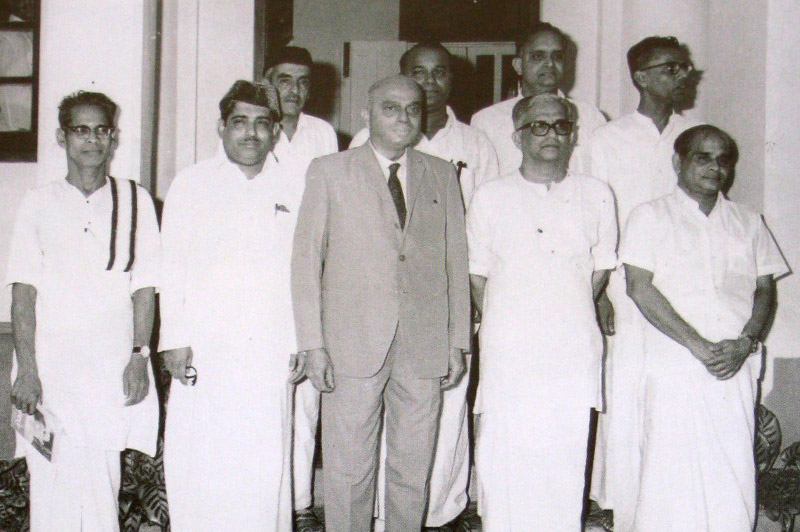
- K. T. Jacob (bottom right corner) with other ministers in the Achutha Menon ministry

Minister for Revenue, Kerala
- In office 1 November 1969 – 1 August 1970
- Preceded by: K. R. Gowri Amma

Member of the Legislative Assembly
- In office 1967–1970
- Preceded by: Constituency Established
- Succeeded by: Sebastian Thomas
- Constituency: Udumbanchola

Personal details
- Born: 1921
- Died: 14 June 1976
- Party: Communist Party of India

K. T. Jacob (1921–1976) was an Indian politician who was the Minister for Revenue in Kerala from 1 November 1969 to 3 August 1970 in the First C. Achutha Menon ministry.
