= Indian Socialist Party =

The Indian Socialist Party was a political party in the Indian state of Kerala. ISP was founded in May 1969, by the majority of the erstwhile Kerala Samyukta Socialist Party (a splinter group of the Samyukta Socialist Party). The two KSSP ministers in the state government, P. K. Kunju and P. R. Kurup, became members of ISP. The ISP declared that it sought to become an All India party in six months.

ISP had two ministers in the C. Achutha Menon cabinet formed in October 1969, O. Koran and N.K. Seshan.
