= United Front (1970–1979, Kerala) =

Political alliance

Kerala Chief Ministers

4th Assembly (1970–1977)

- C. Achutha Menon (1970–1977)

5th Assembly (1977–1979)

- K. Karunakaran (1977)
- A. K. Antony (1977–1978)
- P. K. Vasudevan Nair (1978–1979)
- C. H. Mohammed Koya (1978–1979)

United Front (Malayalam: Aikya Munnani), known until 1971 as Mini Front (1970–1971) and as Maxi Front (1971–1979) thereafter, was a coalition of political parties in Kerala state, India, which was the ruling combine in the state from 1970 to 1979 (4th and 5th Kerala Legislative Assemblies). The coalition was formed by five political parties immediately before the 1970 Kerala Legislative Assembly election. It saw the inclusion a few other parties in the following years.

- Indian National Congress (INC)
- Communist Party of India (CPI)
- Indian Union Muslim League (IUML)
- Revolutionary Socialist Party (RSP)
- Praja Socialist Party (PSP)
- Kerala Congress (later joined)

United Front was dissolved in 1979 after the constituent parties left the coalition in order to form new political coalitions, viz. the Left Democratic Front and the United Democratic Front.

== Background ==
=== United Front Government (1967–1969) ===
The 1967 Kerala Legislative Assembly election had seen the formation and dissolution of Seven Party Front, a coalition of seven parties,

- Communist Party of India Marxist (CPIM)
- Communist Party of India (CPI)
- Indian Union Muslim League (IUML)
- Revolutionary Socialist Party (RSP)
- Indian Socialist Party (ISP)
- Kerala Socialist Party (KSP)
- Karshaka Thozhilali Party (KTP)

This coalition was also known as the United Front.

=== Mini Front Government (1969–1970) ===
Due to internal conflicts between CPIM and CPI, this coalition broke in October 1969 and

- Communist Party of India (CPI)
- Indian Union Muslim League (IUML)
- Revolutionary Socialist Party (RSP)
- Indian Socialist Party (ISP)

constituted a Mini Front which formed government with the external support from Indian National Congress.

C. Achutha Menon (CPI) was sworn in as Chief Minister on 1 November 1969. But the split in Indian Socialist Party and group politics within the Congress party led to the fall of Achutha Menon government on 1 August 1970.

The Kerala state came under President's rule from 4 August 1970 to 3 October 1970.

== Formation of United Front (1970) ==
The 1970 Kerala Legislative Assembly election saw the political parties contesting mainly as three alliances.

- United Front
  - Indian National Congress (INC)
  - Communist Party of India (CPI)
  - Indian Union Muslim League (IUML)
  - Revolutionary Socialist Party (RSP)
  - Praja Socialist Party (PSP)
- Front led by CPI(M)
  - Communist Party of India Marxist (CPIM)
  - Samyukta Socialist Party (SSP)
  - Indian Socialist Party (ISP)
  - Karshaka Thozhilali Party (KTP)
  - Kerala Socialist Party (KSP)
- Democratic Front
  - Kerala Congress
  - Indian National Congress (Organisation)

=== Election results ===
In the 1977 Kerala Legislative Assembly election, Indian National Congress, Communist Party of India, Indian Union Muslim League, Revolutionary Socialist Party and Kerala Congress contested under the United Front which was supported by NDP and Praja Socialist Party. The alliance won 111 seats in a house of 140 (Congress–38, CPI–23, Kerala Congress–20, IUML–13, RSP–9, NDP–5, PSP–3)

Marxist-led Opposition won just 29 seats (Communist Party of India Marxist –17, Janata Party–6, Rebel Kerala Congress–2, Rebel Muslim League–3, and independent–1).

=== Government formation ===
In the 1970 Legislative Assembly election, the United Front won majority and formed government on 4 October 1970 with C. Achutha Menon as the Chief Minister. Although Indian National Congress was part of United Front it did not join the ministry at first, but extended support from outside.

The Cabinet was expanded on two occasions, when the Indian National Congress joined in September 1971, and to induct the nominees of the Kerala Congress in December 1975.

== Emergency (1975–1977) ==
The formal term of the government expired on 21 October 1975 but was extended on three occasions over six month periods during the Emergency.

C. Achutha Menon continued as Chief Minister until 25 March 1977, becoming the first Chief Minister of Kerala to complete normal constitutional term.

== After the Emergency (1977–1979) ==
- Indian National Congress leader K. Karunakaran sworn in as Chief Minister on 25 March 1977. But he had to resign within a month.
- A. K. Antony replaced him as Chief Minister but Antony himself resigned on 27 October 1978.
- P. K. Vasudevan Nair (CPI) became the Chief Minister on 29 October 1978 but resigned on 7 October 1979
- C.H. Mohammed Koya (IUML) assumed office on 12 October 1979 but could not remain in office for long.

== Aftermath ==
Following the resignation Koya, the Kerala Governor dissolved the Legislative Assembly on 30 November 1979 and Kerala was brought under President's rule.

The 1980 election witnessed further consolidation of political parties under new titles- Left Democratic Front and United Democratic Front.
