= K. Narayana Kurup =

Indian politician

Personal details
- Born: 23 October 1927
- Died: 26 June 2013 (aged 85)
- Party: Kerala Congress (M)
- Spouse: Smt K. Leela Devi
- Children: 7 (including N. Jayaraj)
- Parent(s): Shri K. P. Krishnan Nair; Smt Kuttiyamma

K. Narayana Kurup (23 October 1927 – 26 June 2013) was an Indian senior leader of Kerala Congress (Mani), a splinter faction of Kerala Congress. He was a former Minister and Deputy Speaker in Kerala, India and a former MLA from Vazhoor in Kottayam district.
