= K. Karunakaran =

Indian politician and former Chief Minister of Kerala

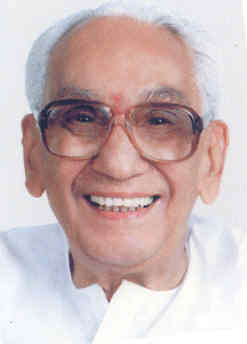

Union Minister for Industry
- In office 11 June 1995 – 16 May 1996
- Prime Minister: P. V. Narasimha Rao
- Preceded by: Ajit Singh
- Succeeded by: Suresh Prabhu

5th Chief Minister of Kerala
- In office 24 June 1991 – 16 March 1995
- Preceded by: E. K. Nayanar
- Succeeded by: A. K. Antony
- In office 24 May 1982 – 25 March 1987
- Preceded by: President's rule
- Succeeded by: E. K. Nayanar
- In office 28 December 1981 – 17 March 1982
- Preceded by: President's rule
- Succeeded by: President's rule
- In office 25 March 1977 – 25 April 1977
- Preceded by: C. Achutha Menon
- Succeeded by: A. K. Antony

Minister of Home Affairs, Government of Kerala
- In office March 1973 – 25 March 1977
- Chief Minister: C. Achutha Menon
- Preceded by: C. H. Muhammad Koya
- Succeeded by: K. M. Mani

Leader of Opposition in Kerala Legislative Assembly
- In office 26 March 1987 – 17 June 1991
- In office 25 January 1980 – 20 October 1981
- In office 29 October 1978 – 7 October 1979
- In office 6 March 1967 – 1 November 1969

Member of the Kerala Legislative Assembly
- In office 1967 – 1996
- Constituency: Mala (7 Terms)

Member of Parliament, Lok Sabha
- In office 28 February 1998 – 6 October 1999
- Constituency: Thiruvananthapuram
- In office 6 October 1999 – 16 May 2004
- Constituency: Mukundapuram

Member of Parliament, Rajya Sabha
- In office 25 April 1995 – 28 February 1998
- In office 3 April 2004 – 1 May 2005

Member of the Travancore–Cochin Legislative Assembly
- In office 1 July 1949 – 23 March 1956

Member of the Kochi Legislative Assembly
- In office 1948 – 1949

Personal details
- Born: Kannoth Karunakara Marar; 5 July 1918 Chirakkal, Madras Presidency, British India (present day Kannur, Kerala, India)
- Died: 23 December 2010 (aged 92) Thiruvananthapuram, Kerala, India
- Party: Indian National Congress
- Other political affiliations: Democratic Indira Congress (Karunakaran)
- Spouse: Kalyanikutty Amma (m. 1954; died 1993)
- Children: K. Muraleedharan; Padmaja Venugopal
- Parents: Thekkedathu Ravunni Marar; Kannoth Kalyani Amma
- As of 2 November, 2007 Source: Government of Kerala

Kannoth Karunakaran (5 July 1918 – 23 December 2010) was an Indian politician, political strategist, decision maker and statesman who served as the chief minister of Kerala in 1977, from 1981 to March 1982, from May 1982 to 1987 and from 1991 to 1995. He is the founder of the Indian National Congress (INC)-led United Democratic Front (UDF) coalition, which governed the state in the periods of 1982-87, 1991–96, 2001–06 and 2011–16; and currently is the ruling alliance in Kerala since 2026. He has also served as the Union Minister for Industry from 1995 to 1996 and served as the Leader of the Opposition in the Kerala Legislative Assembly for four terms- 1967 to 1969, 1978 to 1979, 1980 to 1981 and 1987 to 1991. He also has the distinction of being one of the longest serving Congress Legislature Party (CLP) Leaders in the country, holding that post from 1967 to 1995.

Karunakaran was close to former Prime Ministers Indira Gandhi and Rajiv Gandhi. At the peak of his career in the 1980s and 1990s, he enjoyed considerable access, confidence and control at the All India Congress Committee (AICC), such that he had an important role in helping P. V. Narasimha Rao become Prime Minister of India. He played a crucial role in nurturing and strengthening the INC into a strong political party in Kerala and enjoyed mass support of not just party workers but the entire anti-communist bloc that was active in Kerala. He is greatly known for his decision making and strategies and was widely seen as a kingmaker or as a chanakyan in the history of Indian politics. He is also credited with bringing development to multiple sectors in Kerala by spearheading key projects, including Kochi Airport, the country's first public-private international airport, the Rajiv Gandhi Centre for Biotechnology, and Kochi's Jawaharlal Nehru International Stadium.

== Personal life ==
Karunakaran was born on 5 July 1918 in Chirakkal near Kannur to a Nair Marar family to Thekkedathu Ravunni Marar and Kannoth Kalyani Amma . He had two elder brothers, Kannoth Kunjirama Marar and Kannoth Balakrishna Marar; a younger brother, Kannoth Damodara "Appunni" Marar; and a sister, Devaki, who died when Karunakaran was five years old. His father was a record keeper in the erstwhile Malabar District.

During his childhood, Karunakaran was an expert in swimming, painting, football and volleyball. Though he was named Karunakara Marar, he later dropped his caste title, and came to be known just by his given name.

Karunakaran began his education at Vadakara Government Lower Primary School in 1923. Later, he studied in Andallur Government School and Raja's High School near his home in Chirakkal. After graduating high school, he went to Thrissur and enrolled at the fine arts college, where he obtained degrees in painting and mathematics. For treating an eye disorder, he went to his maternal uncle's home in Vellanikkara near Thrissur, along with his eldest brother Kunjirama Marar. Later, he married his uncle's daughter Kalyanikkutty Amma in 1954 at Guruvayoor Temple, when he was 36 and she was 30. Their children are Congress politician K. Muraleedharan and BJP politician Padmaja Venugopal.

In the early hours of 3 June 1992, during his last term as Chief Minister, he had a near-fatal car accident on his way back to Thiruvananthapuram, after completing his campaigns for the by-elections to be held in the then-Njarakkal Assembly Constituency in Ernakulam district. He recovered after prolonged treatment in both India and the US. In the next year, his wife died following a heart ailment, a loss which deeply affected Karunakaran for the rest of his life.

== Political career ==
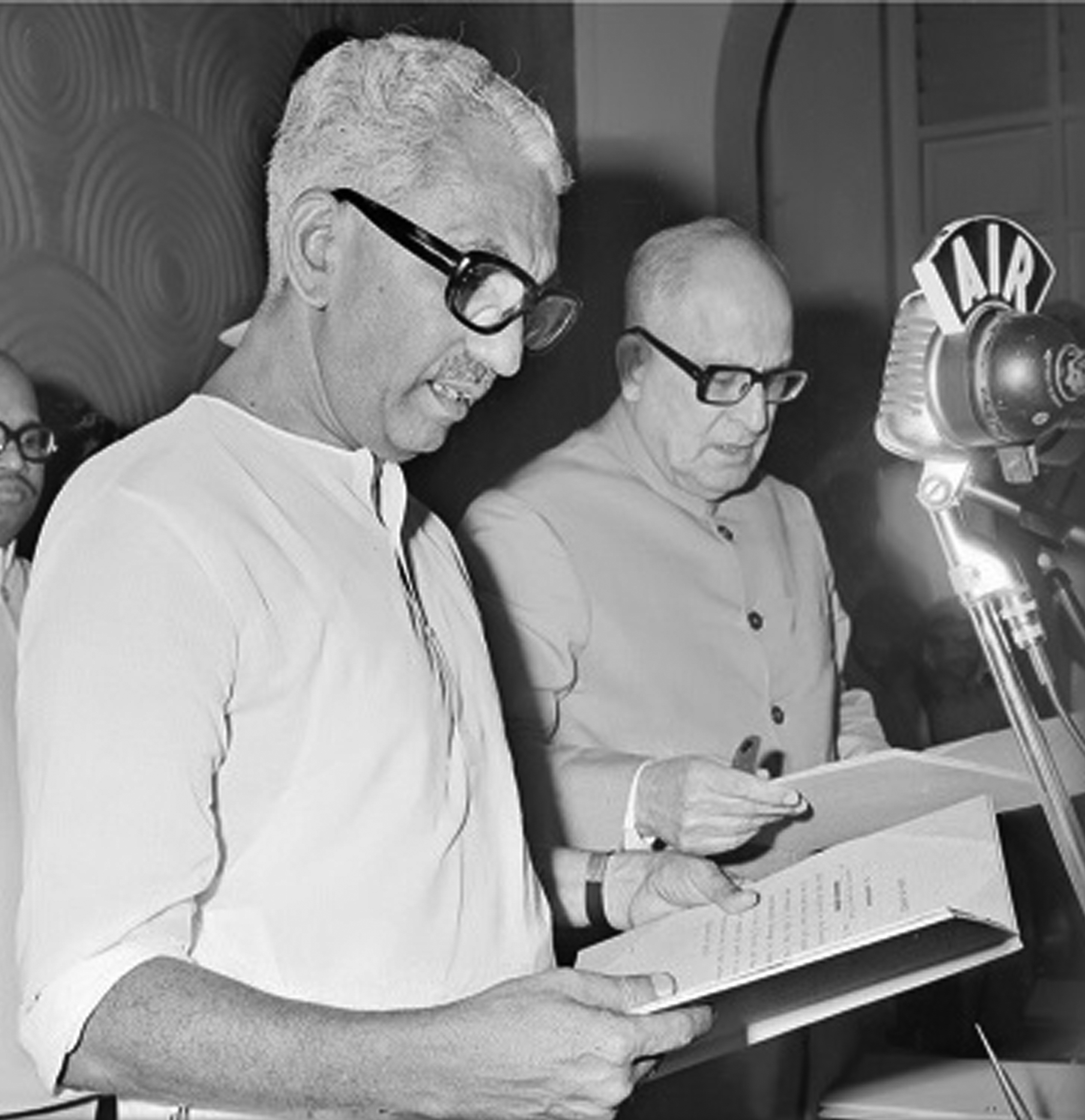
Karunakaran in 1977

In 1937, Karunakaran joined the flood relief camps that were conducted by V. R. Krishnan Ezhuthachan, C. Achutha Menon, R. M. Manakkalath and other leaders of Prajamandalam, an early freedom movement in Kochi. He became a member of the INC and began to wear khadi. He also participated intensively in trade union activities in the vast Thattil rubber estates where his uncle Raghavan Nair was a writer. During this time he used his artistic skills and labour to help the workers' union, which would become the Indian National Trade Union Congress (INTUC), with their posters and campaigns. Gradually, he was picked up by Panampilly Govinda Menon as his favourite follower. Eventually, Karunakaran rose to the level of senior leader of the INTUC, which became one of the largest trade unions in India with over 33 million members. He went on to become INC's Thrissur District Committee President, after which he was elected to the Cochin Legislative Assembly twice before the formation of Kerala State. He contested the 1957 Kerala Legislative Assembly elections against trade unionist and ex-INC member Dr. A. R. Menon, going onto to lose by around two thousand votes.

After a career of both achievements and setbacks in his 30s and most of his 40s, K. Karunakaran was allotted a ticket to contest from a Communist stronghold, Thrissur's Mala constituency, considered a "safe seat" for the Left, in the 1965 Kerala Legislative Assembly Elections. To the astonishment of most political observers, 47-year-old K. Karunakaran defeated the Communist candidate by more than 3000 votes, and went on to represent the constituency in seven successive elections: 1967, 1970, 1977, 1980, 1982, 1987, and 1991.

— Shashi Tharoor, in an article published on Mathrubhumi online

The VIP pavilion in Jawaharlal Nehru Stadium in Kaloor, Kochi is named in his honour.

In 1967, when Karunakaran was elected to the State Legislature for the first time, the Congress was at its lowest ebb in the state having been routed in the election with just 9 legislators on its side (less than the 10 percent strength which is now mandatory to be recognized as the official opposition party). The defeat of many veteran leaders paved the way for Karunakaran to take up the mantle of the Leader of the Opposition. Karunakaran quickly adapted to the role with his dexterous and Machiavellian capabilities putting the EMS Namboodiripad ministry on its toes despite the massive majority it enjoyed in the assembly.

In 1969, Karunakaran faced a severe setback when the Congress legislature party vertically split, leaving Karunakaran with the support of just 5 MLAs. However, Karunakaran, always a master strategist bided his time and played a crucial role in the overthrow of the Namboodiripad ministry and the subsequent formation of a coalition with the new Chief Minister, C. Achutha Menon. By the mid-term elections, the Congress had recovered significantly under Karunakaran and emerged as the largest party post the elections. Although Karunakaran could have technically staked a claim for Chief Ministership in 1970, he chose not to do so, being aware of Achutha Menon's administrative capabilities and visionary ideas for the state. Instead, he went to become the Home Minister in the cabinet, by virtue of which he was the de facto deputy in the cabinet.

In 1977, following the National Emergency, when the Congress was swept out of power across the nation, Karunakaran led the Congress-coalition government to a landslide victory securing 111 seats in the 1977 Kerala Legislative Assembly elections. However, he had to resign after one month following the controversies that emerged about the Rajan case paving the way for his rival AK Antony to become Chief Minister. Regardless, he emerged as a strong supporter of Indira Gandhi after the emergency.

Political instability continued with Antony, P.K. Vasudevan Nair and C.H. Mohammad Koya all serving as Chief Ministers in the 5th legislative assembly from 1977 to 1979, eventually calling for the need for a fresh mandate from the public. With the CPI, RSP, the Antony-faction and K.M. Mani joining hands with the CPI(M) to form the Left Democratic Front in 1979-80, the residual Congress under Karunakaran was doomed. The newly formed United Democratic Front consisting of the Congress, Muslim League and the Kerala Congress faction led by P.J. Joseph suffered a crushing defeat in the 1980 assembly elections winning a mere 46 seats. Nevertheless, Karunakaran went on to become the Leader of the Opposition.

As in 1969, Karunakaran deftly took advantage of the discord prevailing between the CPI(M) and the Antony-faction, eventually leading to the collapse of the E.K. Nayanar government in October 1981. Subsequently, Karunakaran went onto form his second administration in December 1981, after a brief spell of President's rule. However, he faced a dilemma as both the treasury and opposition benches were tied, thus requiring the Speaker, A.C. Jose to cast his vote to save the government. This went to become a farcical experiment with the speaker casting his vote on occasion eight times to save the government. Eventually, in March 1982, a legislator defected from the treasury benches and the government lost the no-confidence motion.

In the early elections held in May 1982, the UDF under Karunakaran won a narrow but decisive victory securing 77 seats to the LDF's 63. Karunakaran himself contested from two seats, winning from both- his traditional Mala seat as well as Nemom. Karunakaran was sworn in as Chief Minister for the third time and went on to become just the second Chief Minister to serve a full 5-year term in office. Karunakaran was also successful in ensuring the return of 'rebel' leaders such as A. K. Antony, Oommen Chandy and Vayalar Ravi to the Congress.

In March 1987, the Karunakaran administration which had been tainted due to corruption charges, rising communalization and infighting, was brought down from power, with the LDF winning 78 seats, leaving just 61 seats for the UDF. The next four years in opposition saw a virtual tug of war between Karunakaran and Antony serving as the new Leader of the Opposition and State Congress President respectively. The Congress and the UDF were in virtual disarray, ceding wide political ground to the Marxists under Chief Minister Nayanar. Following the rout suffered by the UDF in the panchayat elections in 1990-91, Nayanar took the gamble of holding an early assembly election in May 1991 along with the already scheduled parliamentary election. The tragic assassination of former Prime Minister Rajiv Gandhi, two days before polling was scheduled to take place completely changed the tide in Kerala. The UDF on the back of a sympathy-wave rode to power, sweeping 90 seats. The Congress itself won 57 seats, its highest tally since 1960. Karunakaran was propelled back to the post of Chief Minister for the fourth and what would be the final time.

His downfall in state politics began with a car accident that happened to him in June 1992. He was returning from Aluva after attending multiple meetings in Njarakkal Legislative Constituency, where there were by-elections, and his car collided with a tree at Pallippuram near Thiruvananthapuram, causing him serious fractures in head, limbs and the sixth vertebrae of his spine. After the accident, he was hospitalized in Sree Chitra Tirunal Institute for Medical Sciences and Technology, Trivandrum and was unable to manage the finances and administration of the state government. This became a political crisis when the state government was managed by a kitchen cabinet of Karunakaran's son K. Muraleedharan and his trusted aide and Chief Secretary of the Indian Administrative Service, K. Padmakumar. This was an issue within the state INC as then-Finance Minister and second in command of the ruling coalition Oommen Chandy, belonging to the party's pro-Antony faction, was not given command. By 1993, Karunakaran had recovered and became active in government affairs. During this period, discontent was further aggravated by bringing K. M. Mani into the foray when a split occurred between Kerala Congress and Kerala Congress (Jacob). Meanwhile, a revisionist (Malayalam: തിരുത്തൽവാദി, romanized: thiruthalvadi) group emerged within Karunakaran's INC faction led by G. Karthikeyan, Ramesh Chennithala and M. I. Shanavas against his authoritarian tendencies and proxy rule by his son. The situation intensified into an intra-party revolt when M. A. Kuttappan, nominated by the state INC as a Rajya Sabha nominee, was denied candidacy by party leadership, which Karunakaran had considerable influence over. The difference of opinion that emerged between Chandy and Karunakaran became public and vociferous with Chandy threatening to resign and giving speeches against Karunakaran. By the end of 1994, the ISRO espionage case emerged and the case led to political tensions when the Kerala High Court made remarks against then-Inspector General of the Kerala Police and Karunakaran ally Raman Srivastava. Thereafter the dissidence in the party grew into a full-scale crisis, with the Antony faction threatening to withdraw their support from the government, and G. K. Moopanar arriving on behalf of P. V. Narasimha Rao to insist that Karunakaran resign. Eventually, Karunakaran was forced to step down from the post of Chief Minister on 16 March 1995 in favour of his bête-noire, A.K. Antony. He was also compelled to relinquish the post of the Leader of the Congress Legislature Party (CLP) which he had been holding since 1967- the longest tenure of any Congress leader in that post in any state in the country. It was tragic for Karunakaran that the ISRO case later emerged as a conspiracy case which was manipulated by his rivals to oust him.

Subsequently, he was elected to the Rajya Sabha and served as the Union Minister for Industries under Prime Minister P.V. Narasimha Rao from June 1995 to May 1996. His foray into national politics was much less successful with Karunakaran suffering a shock defeat in his maiden parliamentary outing from his stronghold of Thrissur by a wafer-thin margin of 1,480 votes. He might have well become the next Congress Parliamentary Party Leader had he been elected to the Lok Sabha in 1996. He squarely went to blame Antony and his supporters for engineering his defeat and causing his downfall.

Although Karunakaran went to get elected to the Lok Sabha in 1998 and 1999 from Trivandrum and Mukundapuram respectively, he failed to rise to the top echelons of the party. Confined to state politics, he emerged as a thorn for Antony and resisted Antony's elevation to Chief Ministership following the landslide victory of the UDF in 2001. He subsequently raised the banner of revolt on multiple occasions and tried to topple Antony, despite his son K. Muraleedharan becoming the new State Congress President, Eventually, Antony was compelled to appoint Muraleedharan as a Minister and Padmaja Venugopal, Karunakaran's daughter as the Congress candidate from Karunakaran's constituency. Both Muraleedharan and Padmaja were defeated in Congress bastions by landslide margins, along with the other UDF candidates, tarnishing both Antony and Karunakaran in the process. The subsequent resignation of Antony and the installation of Oommen Chandy as Chief Minister only increased tensions, leading to Karunakaran walking out of the Congress in 2005.

The Democratic Indira Congress (Karunakaran) (DIC(K)) party was founded at a meeting of Karunakuran's INC faction in Thrissur on 1 May 2005. Initially it was called National Congress (Indira), but the name was changed to DIC(K) for registration purposes in August 2005. Karunakaran rejoined the INC on 11 December 2007.

== Death ==
Karunakaran died at 5:30 PM on 23 December 2010, aged 92, at Ananthapuri Hospital in Thiruvananthapuram. He had had respiratory problems, a fever and other age related diseases and had been hospitalized since 10 December 2010. His condition worsened following a stroke on 22 December and he died following cardiac arrest, as declared by doctors. It was coincidental that his and P. V. Narasimha Rao's deaths were on same date, Rao having died six years earlier. Karunakaran had played a key role in backing the Rao government and later Rao had dismissed him from the chair of Chief Minister of Kerala. His funeral was attended by the then Prime Minister Manmohan Singh and the AICC chief Sonia Gandhi. He was cremated with full state honors at his residence in Punkunnam, Thrissur, near the grave of his wife, who predeceased him in 1993.

== Electoral history ==
House	Election	Constituency	Result	Vote margin
Kerala Legislative Assembly	1957	Thrissur	Lost	2486
Kerala Legislative Assembly	1965	Mala	Won	4762
Kerala Legislative Assembly	1967	Mala	Won	364
Kerala Legislative Assembly	1970	Mala	Won	11,053
Kerala Legislative Assembly	1977	Mala	Won	9466
Kerala Legislative Assembly	1980	Mala	Won	3402
Kerala Legislative Assembly	1982	Mala	Won	3410
Kerala Legislative Assembly	1982	Nemom	Won	3348
Kerala Legislative Assembly	1987	Mala	Won	6292
Kerala Legislative Assembly	1991	Mala	Won	2474
Lok Sabha	1996	Thrissur	Lost	1480
Lok Sabha	1998	Thiruvananthapuram	Won	15,398
Lok Sabha	1999	Mukundapuram	Won	52,463

=== Rajya Sabha ===
Position	Party	Constituency	From	To	Tenure
Member of Parliament, Rajya Sabha (1st Term)	INC	Kerala	25 April 1995	21 April 1997	1 year, 361 days
Member of Parliament, Rajya Sabha (2nd Term)	INC	Kerala	22 April 1997	3 March 1998	315 days
Member of Parliament, Rajya Sabha (3rd Term)	INC	Kerala	3 April 2004	2 May 2005	1 year, 29 days

== Controversies ==
K. Karunakaran was the home minister of Kerala during the Emergency period and decimated the Naxalite–Maoist insurgency in Kerala. After the Emergency, the Rajan case rocked Kerala politics and Karunakaran was forced to step down as the case attracted national attention. A habeas corpus petition was filed by T. V. Eachara Warrier asking the state government to produce his son Rajan (a student of the Regional Engineering College, Calicut who had actively participated in protests against the Emergency) in court. Rajan was allegedly killed by the police at the Kakkayam police torture camp and his body disposed of. The legal battle led by his father became one of the most remembered human rights fights in the state and diminished Karunakaran's popularity.

Karunakaran was accused of involvement in the Palmolein Oil Import Scam, about which a case was pending before the Supreme Court at the time of his death. The Central Vigilance Commission (CVC) who finally investigated the case mentioned in 2013 that no case can be made against the officials and that there was no loss to the state government, and the case was withdrawn.

He was forced to resign due to allegations that his subordinate, senior Indian Police Service officer Raman Srivastava, was involved in the ISRO espionage scandal.

== See also ==
- Chief Ministers of Kerala
- Kerala Ministers
- Democratic Indira Congress (Karunakaran)
- Kerala Pradesh Congress Committee

Political offices
Preceded by C. Achutha Menon	Chief Minister of Kerala; 1977	Succeeded by A. K. Antony
Preceded by E.K. Nayanar	Chief Minister of Kerala; 1981–1987	Succeeded by E.K. Nayanar
Preceded by E.K. Nayanar	Chief Minister of Kerala; 1991–1995	Succeeded by A. K. Antony
