= Alappuzha Assembly constituency =

Constituency of the Kerala legislative assembly in India

Coordinates: 9.51°N 76.34°E

Alappuzha
- Constituency No. 104 for the Kerala Legislative Assembly
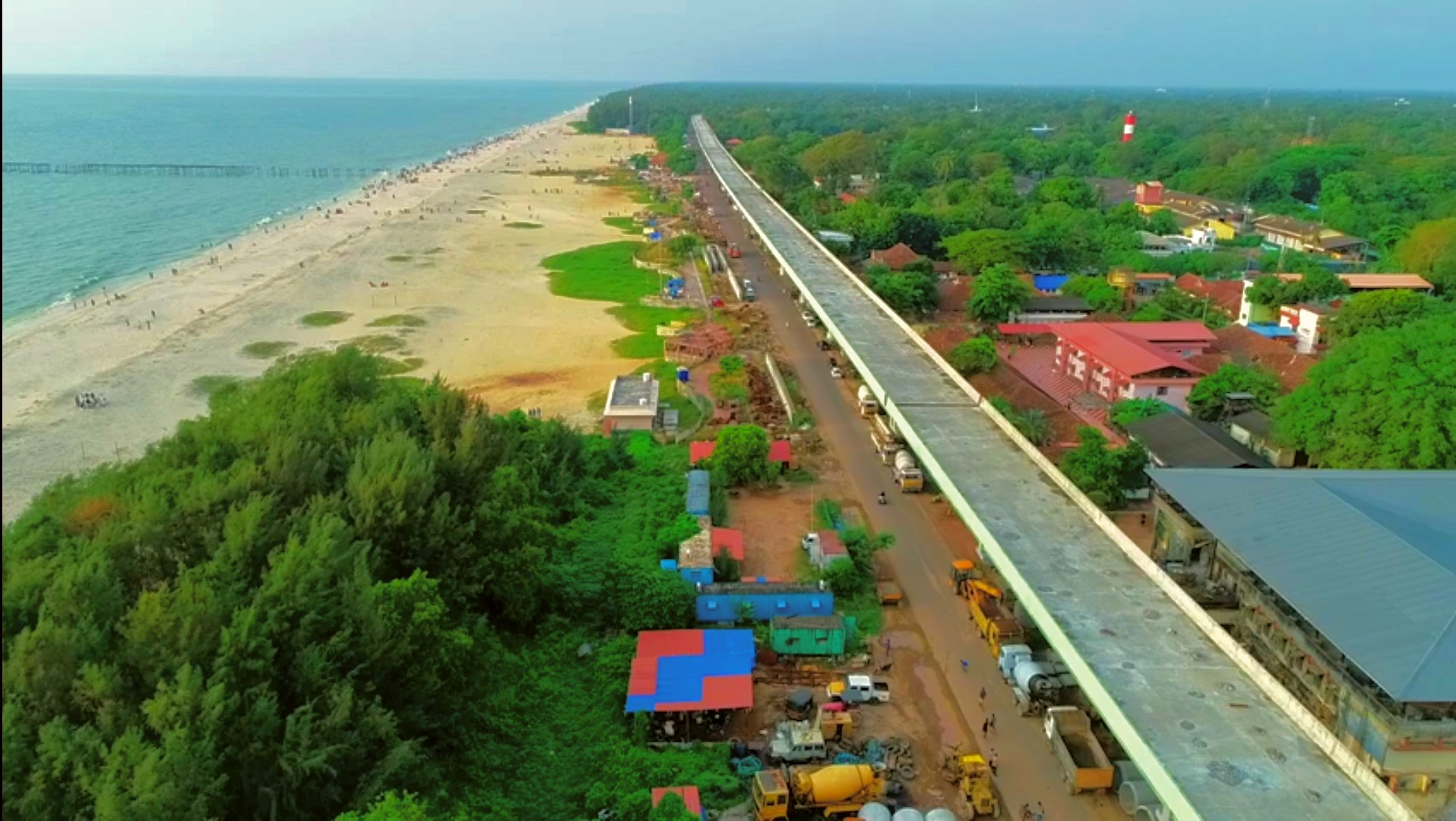
- Alappuzha Bypass

Constituency details
- Country: India
- Region: South India
- State: Kerala
- District: Alappuzha
- Lok Sabha constituency: Alappuzha
- Established: 1957
- Total electors: 1,93,532 (2016)
- Reservation: None

Member of Legislative Assembly
- 16th Kerala Legislative Assembly
- Incumbent A.D. Thomas
- Party: INC
- Elected year: 2026

Alappuzha State assembly constituency is one of the 140 state legislative assembly constituencies in Kerala in southern India. It is also one of the seven state legislative assembly constituencies included in Alappuzha Lok Sabha constituency. The current MLA is A.D. Thomas of INC.

== Local self-governed segments ==
Alappuzha Assembly constituency is composed of the following local self-governed segments:

| Name | Status (Grama panchayat/Municipality) | Taluk | Ruling Alliance |
|---|---|---|---|
| Parts of Alappuzha | Municipality | Ambalappuzha | UDF |
| Aryad | Grama panchayat | Ambalappuzha | LDF |
| Mannancherry | Grama panchayat | Ambalappuzha | LDF |
| Mararikulam North | Grama panchayat | Cherthala | LDF |
| Mararikulam South | Grama panchayat | Ambalappuzha | LDF |

== Members of Legislative Assembly ==
The following list contains all members of Kerala Legislative Assembly who have represented the constituency:

| Election | Niyama Sabha | Member | Party | Tenure |
|---|---|---|---|---|
| 1957 | 1st | T. V. Thomas | CPI | 1957 – 1960 |
| 1960 | 2nd | A. Nafeesath Beevi | INC | 1960 – 1965 |
| 1967 | 3rd | T. V. Thomas | CPI | 1967 – 1970 |
| 1970 | 4th | T. V. Thomas | CPI | 1970 – 1977 |
| 1977 | 5th | P. K. Vasudevan Nair | CPI | 1977 – 1980 |
| 1980 | 6th | P. K. Vasudevan Nair | CPI | 1980 – 1982 |
| 1982 | 7th | K. P. Ramachandran Nair | NDP | 1982 – 1987 |
| 1987 | 8th | Rosamma Punnose | CPI | 1987 – 1991 |
| 1991 | 9th | K. P. Ramachandran Nair | NDP | 1991 – 1996 |
| 1996 | 10th | K. C. Venugopal | INC | 1996 – 2001 |
| 2001 | 11th | K. C. Venugopal | INC | 2001 – 2006 |
| 2006 | 12th | K. C. Venugopal | INC | 2006 – 2009 |
| 2009* | 12th | A. A. Shukoor | INC | 2009 – 2011 |
| 2011 | 13th | T. M. Thomas Isaac | CPI(M) | 2011 – 2016 |
| 2016 | 14th | T. M. Thomas Isaac | CPI(M) | 2016 - 2021 |
| 2021 | 15th | P. P. Chitharanjan | CPI(M) | 2021-2026 |
| 2026 | 16th | A.D. Thomas | INC | 2026 incumbent |

*by-election

== Election results ==
Percentage change (±%) denotes the change in the number of votes from the immediate previous election.

=== 2026 ===
2026 Kerala Legislative Assembly election: Alappuzha
| Party | Candidate | Votes | % | ±% |
|---|---|---|---|---|
| INC | A. D. Thomas | 81,065 | 51.42 | ▲12.44 |
| CPI(M) | P. P. Chitharanjan | 60,050 | 38.09 | ▼8.24 |
| BJP | M. J. Job | 15,375 | 9.75 | ▼3.91 |
| Independent | Joseph Chacko | 163 | 0.10 | |
| Independent | Alleppey Sugunan | 117 | 0.07 | |
| Independent | Jyothi Abraham | 98 | 0.06 | |
| NOTA | None of the above | 975 | 0.61 | ▼0.08 |
| Margin of victory | | 21,015 | 13.29 | ▲5.94 |
| Turnout | | 1,57,661 | 83.00 | |
| INC gain from CPI(M) | | Swing | | |

=== 2021 ===
There were 1,54,149 registered voters in the constituency for the 2021 Kerala Niyamasabha Election.

2021 Kerala Legislative Assembly election: Alappuzha
| Party | Candidate | Votes | % | ±% |
|---|---|---|---|---|
| CPI(M) | P. P. Chitharanjan | 73,412 | 46.33 | ▼6.96 |
| INC | Dr. K. S. Manoj | 61,768 | 38.98 | ▲5.56 |
| BJP | Sandeep Vachaspathi | 21,650 | 13.66 | ▲2.00 |
| NOTA | NOTA | 1,089 | 0.69 | ▲0.14 |
| BSP | K. C. Subeendran | 207 | 0.13 | − |
| SUCI(C) | K. A. Vinod | 205 | 0.13 | ▼0.03 |
| BDP | Shylendran | 115 | 0.07 | |
| Margin of victory | | 11,644 | 7.35 | ▼0.95 |
| Turnout | | 1,58,446 | 78.44 | ▼2.24 |
| CPI(M) hold | | Swing | ▼6.96 | |

=== 2016 ===
There were 1,41,243 registered voters in the constituency for the 2016 Kerala Niyamasabha Election.

2016 Kerala Legislative Assembly election: Alappuzha
| Party | Candidate | Votes | % | ±% |
|---|---|---|---|---|
| CPI(M) | T. M. Thomas Isaac | 83,211 | 53.29 | ▼0.42 |
| INC | Laly Vincent | 52,179 | 33.42 | ▼8.72 |
| BJP | Ranjith Sreenivas | 18,214 | 11.66 | ▲9.15 |
| NOTA | None of the above | 856 | 0.55 | − |
| SDPI | P. A. Sulaiman | 703 | 0.45 | ▼0.37 |
| PDP | K. Mujeeb | 481 | 0.31 | − |
| SUCI(C) | K. A. Vinod | 244 | 0.16 | |
| Independent | Premji K. P. | 149 | 0.10 | |
| Independent | Prasanth | 113 | 0.07 | |
| Margin of victory | | 31,032 | 19.87 | ▲8.30 |
| Turnout | | 1,56,150 | 80.68 | ▼0.52 |
| CPI(M) hold | | Swing | ▼0.42 | |

=== 2011 ===
There were 1,93,532 registered voters in the constituency for the 2011 election.

2011 Kerala Legislative Assembly election: Alappuzha
| Party | Candidate | Votes | % | ±% |
|---|---|---|---|---|
| CPI(M) | T. M. Thomas Issac | 75,857 | 53.71 | ▲9.29 |
| INC | Adv. P. J. Mathew | 59,515 | 42.14 | ▼7.82 |
| BJP | Kottaram Unnikrishnan | 3,450 | 2.51 | ▼0.11 |
| SDPI | T. M. Samad | 1,158 | 0.82 | |
| Independent | Sebastian | 646 | 0.46 | |
| BSP | C. P. Thilakan | 527 | 0.37 | |
| Margin of victory | | 16,342 | 11.57 | ▲6.03 |
| Turnout | | 1,41,243 | 81.20 | |
| CPI(M) gain from INC | | Swing | ▲9.29 | |

=== 2009 ===
There is a bye election will be conducted in Alappuzha assembly constituency at 2009 due to the resignation of sitting MLA K.C. Venugopal.

2009 bye-election: Alappuzha
| Party | Candidate | Votes | % | ±% |
|---|---|---|---|---|
| INC | A. A. Shukoor | 42,774 | 49.96 | ▼8.63 |
| CPI | G. Krishnaprasad | 38,029 | 44.42 | ▲5.78 |
| BJP | K. Babu | 2,247 | 2.62 | ▲1.30 |
| PDP | Adv. K. A. Hassan | 1,804 | 2.10 | − |
| Independent | Shukkoor | 405 | 0.47 | − |
| Independent | Muralidharan | 110 | 0.12 | − |
| Independent | Krishnakumar | 83 | 0.09 | − |
| Independent | P. Vijayan Pillai | 81 | 0.09 | − |
| Independent | Dr. George Joseph Themplangadu | 46 | 0.05 | − |
| Independent | Noushad Shahul Hameed | 31 | 0.03 | − |
| Margin of victory | | 4,745 | 5.54 | ▼14.41 |
| Turnout | | 85,610 | | |
| INC hold | | Swing | ▼8.63 | |

=== 2006 ===
There were 1,14,200 registered voters in the constituency for the 2006 election.

2006 Kerala Legislative Assembly election: Alappuzha
| Party | Candidate | Votes | % | ±% |
|---|---|---|---|---|
| INC | K.C. Venugopal | 49,721 | 58.59 | ▲0.50 |
| CPI | T. J. Anjalose | 32,788 | 38.64 | ▲1.86 |
| BJP | Parayil Radhakrishnan | 1,118 | 1.32 | ▼1.81 |
| Independent | P. C. Venugopal | 489 | 0.58 | |
| AIADMK | A. P. Abrahimkutty | 241 | 0.28 | |
| Independent | M. A. Bindu | 227 | 0.27 | |
| Independent | Anjalose | 192 | 0.23 | |
| Independent | Rajan Kochi | 81 | 0.10 | |
| Invalid | Invalidated Votes | 14 | | |
| Margin of victory | | 16,933 | 19.95 | ▼1.35 |
| Turnout | | 84,871 | 74.32 | ▲9.24 |
| INC hold | | Swing | ▲0.50 | |

=== 2001 ===
There were 1,38,117 registered voters in the constituency for the 2001 election.

2001 Kerala Legislative Assembly election: Alappuzha
| Party | Candidate | Votes | % | ±% |
|---|---|---|---|---|
| INC | K.C. Venugopal | 52,203 | 58.09 | ▲7.19 |
| CPI | A. M. Abdul Raheem | 33,050 | 36.78 | ▼5.62 |
| BJP | D. Krishnan | 2,815 | 3.13 | |
| Independent | Abdul Raheem | 1,176 | 1.31 | |
| SUCI(C) | S. Radhamony | 623 | 0.69 | |
| Invalid | Invalidated Votes | 29 | | |
| Margin of victory | | 19,153 | 21.30 | ▲12.90 |
| Turnout | | 89,896 | 65.08 | ▼6.12 |
| INC hold | | Swing | ▲7.19 | |

=== 1996 ===
There were 1,26,537 registered voters in the constituency for the 1996 election.

1996 Kerala Legislative Assembly election: Alappuzha
| Party | Candidate | Votes | % | ±% |
|---|---|---|---|---|
| INC | K.C. Venugopal | 45,104 | 50.9 | ▲2.6 |
| CPI | P. S. Somasekharan | 37,568 | 42.4 | ▼5.1 |
| PDP | P. M. Hussain | 3,847 | 4.3 | |
| Independent | K. R. Rajappan | 1,190 | 1.3 | |
| Independent | S. Seethilal | 365 | 0.4 | ▼0.3 |
| Independent | Cherian Jacob | 243 | 0.3 | |
| Independent | Muraleedharan | 143 | 0.2 | |
| Independent | Fasy | 103 | 0.1 | |
| Margin of victory | | 7,536 | 8.4 | ▲7.6 |
| Turnout | | 90,104 | 71.2 | ▼0.7 |
| UDF hold | | Swing | ▲2.6 | |

=== 1991 ===
There were 1,24,595 registered voters in the constituency for the 1991 election.

1991 Kerala Legislative Assembly election: Alappuzha
| Party | Candidate | Votes | % | ±% |
|---|---|---|---|---|
| NDP | K. P. Ramachandran Nair | 42,269 | 48.3 | |
| CPI | P. S. Somasekharan | 41,519 | 47.5 | |
| BJP | Arumughan Pillai | 2,513 | 2.9 | |
| Independent | S. Seethilal | 637 | 0.7 | |
| LKD | Vijayam Nelu | 336 | 0.4 | |
| Independent | Usman Mohammed Yousuf | 201 | 0.2 | |
| Margin of victory | | 750 | 0.8 | |
| Turnout | | 89,632 | 71.9 | |
| NDP gain from CPI | | Swing | | |

== See also ==
- Alappuzha
- Alappuzha district
- List of constituencies of the Kerala Legislative Assembly
- 2016 Kerala Legislative Assembly election
