= K. C. Venugopal =

Indian politician (born 1963)

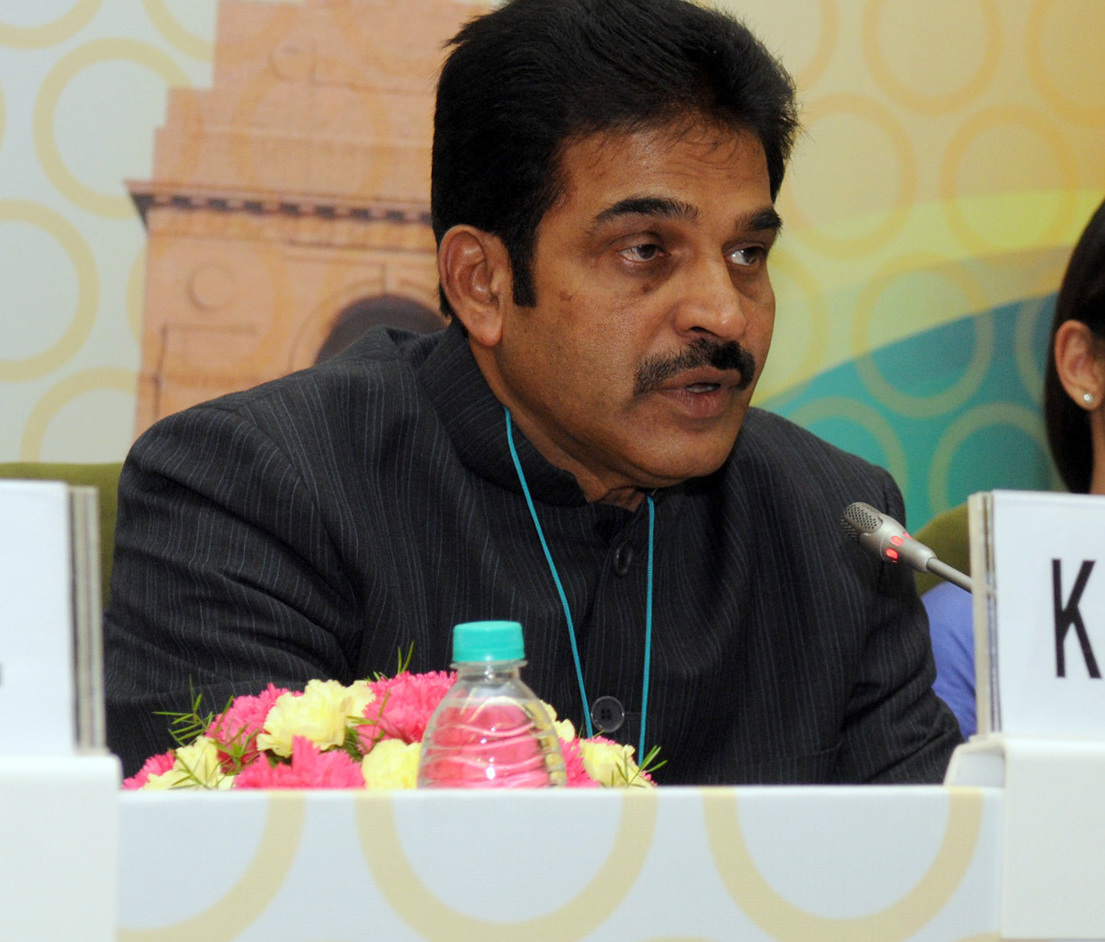
- Venugopal in 2014

Chairman of Public Accounts Committee
- Incumbent
- Assumed office 16 August 2024
- Appointed by: Om Birla (Speaker of the Lok Sabha)
- Preceded by: Adhir Ranjan Chowdhury

Member of Parliament, Rajya Sabha
- In office 19 June 2020 – 4 June 2024
- Preceded by: Ramnarayan Dudi
- Succeeded by: Ravneet Singh Bittu
- Constituency: Rajasthan

General Secretary (Organisation) of the All India Congress Committee
- Incumbent
- Assumed office 2019
- AICC President: Sonia Gandhi (till 2022); Mallikarjun Kharge (from 2022)
- Preceded by: Ashok Gehlot

General Secretary of the Karnataka Pradesh Congress Committee
- In office 22 June 2018 – 11 September 2020
- AICC President: Rahul Gandhi (till 2019); Sonia Gandhi (from 2019)
- Preceded by: Office established
- Succeeded by: Randeep Surjewala

13th Union Minister of State for Civil Aviation
- In office 28 October 2012 – 26 May 2014
- Prime Minister: Manmohan Singh
- Minister: Ajit Singh
- Preceded by: Jayanthi Natarajan
- Succeeded by: G. M. Siddeswara

22nd Union Minister of State for Power
- In office 20 January 2011 – 28 October 2012
- Prime Minister: Manmohan Singh
- Minister: Sushilkumar Shinde; Veerappa Moily
- Preceded by: Bharatsinh Madhavsinh Solanki
- Succeeded by: Jyotiraditya Madhavrao Scindia

Member of Parliament, Lok Sabha
- Incumbent
- Assumed office 4 June 2024
- Preceded by: A. M. Ariff
- Constituency: Alappuzha, Kerala
- In office 31 May 2009 – 23 May 2019
- Preceded by: K. S. Manoj
- Succeeded by: A. M. Ariff
- Constituency: Alappuzha, Kerala

Minister for Tourism and Devaswoms, Government of Kerala
- In office 5 September 2004 – 12 May 2006
- Chief Minister: Oommen Chandy

Member of Kerala Legislative Assembly
- In office 1996 – 2009
- Preceded by: K. P. Ramachandran Nair
- Succeeded by: A. A. Shukoor
- Constituency: Alappuzha

Personal details
- Born: Kozhummal Chattadi Venugopal; 4 February 1963 (age 63) Payyanur, Kerala, India
- Party: Indian National Congress
- Spouse: Asha. (m. 1995)
- Children: 2
- Parents: Kunjukrishnan; Janaki Amma
- Education: University of Calicut
- Source

Kozhummal Chattadi Venugopal (born 4 February 1963) is an Indian politician who is a Member of Parliament, Lok Sabha elected from Alappuzha Lok Sabha constituency. He is a former member of parliament in Upper House and is a member of the Indian National Congress. He has been appointed a General Secretary of AICC and in charge of Karnataka on 29 April 2017. Later, he was given additional charge of the general secretary of the organisation.

He was the Minister of State for Civil Aviation & Ministry of Power in the second UPA government. He was a Rajya Sabha MP from Rajasthan between 2020 and 2024 and an MLA for Alappuzha from 1996 to 2009 and served as Cabinet Minister in the Kerala State Government for Tourism and Devaswoms in 2004.

== Early life ==
Kozhummal Chattadi Venugopal was born on 4 February 1963 to Kunjukrishnan Nair and Janaki Amma in Payyanur, Kannur district of Kerala on 4 February 1963.

Venugopal completed his higher education at Payyannur College, which was affiliated with the University of Calicut at the time. He graduated with a Bachelor of Science (B.Sc.) and later obtained a Master of Science (M.Sc.) in Mathematics from the university in 1986. During his college days, he was also a volleyball player.

== Political career ==
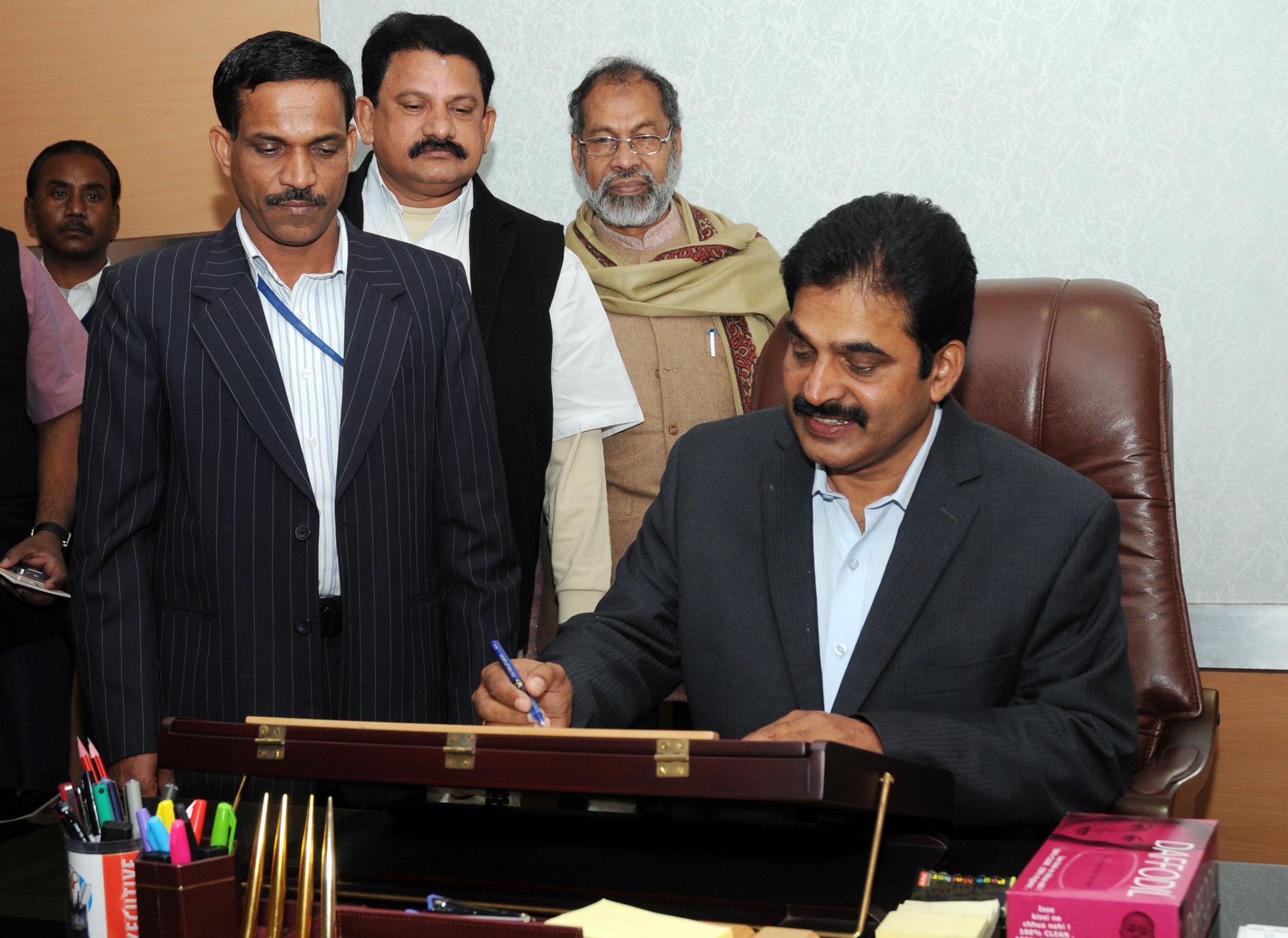
Venugopal taking charge as the Minister of State for Power in Second Manmohan Singh ministry on 20 January 2011.

Venugopal came to active politics through the Student Movement of the Indian National Congress. He became the State President of the Kerala Students Union and State President of the Indian Youth Congress, He was elected to the Kerala Legislative Assembly from Alappuzha Constituency in 1996, 2001 and 2006. He served as the Minister for Dewaswom and Tourism in the Oommen Chandy Ministry from 2004-06. He contested the General Elections to Loksabha from Alappuzha Constituency in 2009 and was elected.

On 29 April 2017, he was chosen as general secretary of All India Congress Committee. He also was made in charge of Congress War Rooms in many elections. He was nominated from Rajasthan as a Member of parliament Rajya Sabha on 19 June 2020. He served until 2024, when he resigned to contest the general election. He won from Alappuzha once again this time with a margin of 63,513 votes.

=== Member of Coordination Committee of INDIA (Alliance) ===
Venugopal was appointed as a member of the Coordination Committee of the Indian National Developmental Inclusive Alliance at its Mumbai convention on 1 September 2023. The coordination committee will decide the national agenda, common campaign issues and common program of the country's main opposition alliance (I.N.D.I.A.).

== Election History ==
House	Election	Party	Constitunecy	Opponent		Result	Majority
Lok Sabha	1991	INC	Kasaragod	CPI(M)	Ramanna Rai	Lost	9,423
Lok Sabha	2009	INC	Alappuzha	CPI(M)	K. S. Manoj	Won	57,635
Lok Sabha	2014	INC	Alappuzha	CPI(M)	C.B. Chandrababu	Won	19,407
Lok Sabha	2024	INC	Alappuzha	CPI(M)	A. M. Ariff	Won	63,513
Kerala Legislative Assembly	1996	INC	Alappuzha	CPI	P. S. Somasekharan	Won	7,536
Kerala Legislative Assembly	2001	INC	Alappuzha	CPI	A. M. Abdul Raheem	Won	19,153
Kerala Legislative Assembly	2006	INC	Alappuzha	CPI	T. J. Anjalose	Won	16,933

== Positions held ==
Positions Held
Position	Duration
Chairperson, Committee on Public Accounts	14 August 2024 – Present
Elected to 18th Lok Sabha	June 2024
Member, Committee on Defence	September 2021 – Present
Member, Consultative Committee for the Ministry of Education	July 2020 – Present
Member, Committee on Transport, Tourism, and Culture	July 2020 – September 2021
Elected to Rajya Sabha	June 2020 – June 2024
Member, Joint Committee on the Enforcement of Security Interest and Recovery of Debts Laws and Miscellaneous Provision (Amendment) Bill, 2016	11 May 2016 – Present
Member, Consultative Committee, Ministry of Human Resource Development	
Member, Railway Convention Committee (R.C.C.)	27 April 2015 – Present
Deputy Whip, Congress Parliamentary Party (Lok Sabha)	
Member, Standing Committee on Transport, Tourism, and Culture	
Member, Committee on Government Assurances	1 September 2014 – Present
Re-elected to 16th Lok Sabha (2nd term)	May 2014
Union Minister of State for Civil Aviation	1 May 2012 – 2014
Union Minister of State, Ministry of Civil Aviation	28 October 2012 – 2014
Union Minister of State, Ministry of Power	1 May 2011 –
Union Minister of State, Ministry of Power	19 January 2011 – 28 October 2012
Member, India-Bangladesh Parliamentary Friendship Group	22 July 2010
Member, Consultative Committee, Ministry of Agriculture	
Member, Railway Convention Committee	
Member, Standing Committee on Transport, Tourism, and Culture	31 August 2009
Member, Committee on Estimates	6 August 2009
Elected to 15th Lok Sabha	2009
Cabinet Minister, Government of Kerala	1 September 2004 – 2006
Minister for Tourism and Devaswom, Government of Kerala	2004 – 2006
Member of Legislative Assembly (MLA), Kerala	1 May 1996 – 2009
Member, Kerala Legislative Assembly (Three Terms)	1996 – 2009
