= V. M. Sudheeran =

Indian politician (born 1948)

V.M. Sudheeran
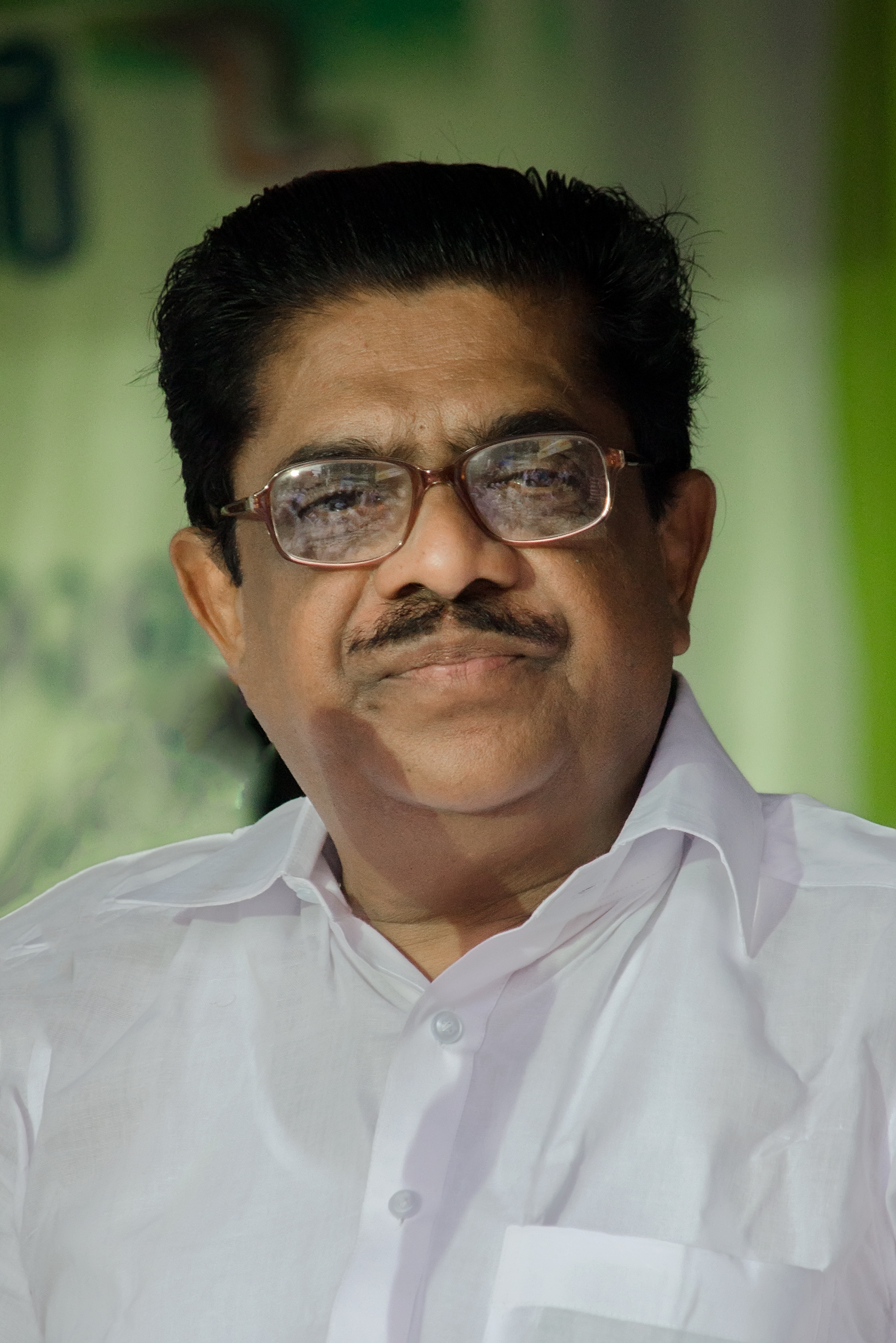

President of the Kerala Pradesh Congress Committee
- In office 10 February 2014 – 10 March 2017
- Preceded by: Ramesh Chennithala
- Succeeded by: M. M. Hassan

Member of Parliament, Lok Sabha
- In office 1996–2004
- Preceded by: T. J. Anjalose
- Succeeded by: K. S. Manoj
- Constituency: Alappuzha
- In office 1977–1980
- Preceded by: P. K. Vasudevan Nair
- Succeeded by: Susheela Gopalan
- Constituency: Alappuzha

Minister for Health, Government of Kerala
- In office April 1995 – May 1996
- Chief Minister: A. K. Antony
- Preceded by: R. Ramachandran Nair
- Succeeded by: A. C. Shanmughadas

Speaker of Kerala Legislative Assembly
- In office 8 March 1985 – 27 March 1987
- Chief Minister: K. Karunakaran
- Preceded by: Vakkom Purushothaman
- Succeeded by: Varkala Radhakrishnan

Member of Kerala Legislative Assembly
- In office 1980–1996
- Preceded by: N. I. Devassykutty
- Succeeded by: Rosamma Chacko
- Constituency: Manalur

Personal details
- Born: 26 May 1948 (age 78) Anthikad, Kingdom of Cochin, Dominion of India (present day Thrissur, Kerala, India)
- Party: Indian National Congress
- Spouse: Latha
- Profession: Politician; Social Worker

Vylopally Mama Sudheeran (born 26 May 1948) is an Indian politician, who was a former President of the Kerala Pradesh Congress Committee (KPCC), former Speaker of the Kerala Legislative Assembly, Health Minister of Kerala, and a prominent political leader in Kerala. He was a member of the 6th, 11th, 12th and 13th Lok Sabha representing Alappuzha each time and a member of the Kerala Legislative Assembly from 1980 to 1996 representing Manalur.

== Political career ==
Sudheeran started his political career through the Kerala Students Union (KSU), which he served as President from 1971 to 1973. He was elected President of the State Youth Congress in 1975 and continued in the position till 1977. He was elected to the 6th Lok Sabha in 1977 from Alapuzha. In 1980, he contested the Niyamasabha elections from Manalur and won. He remained the MLA from the constituency until 1996.

He served as the Speaker of Kerala Legislative Assembly from 1985 to 1987. In 1995, he was appointed Health Minister under Chief Minister A. K. Antony. In 1996, he sought election to the 11th Lok Sabha from Alappuzha and won again. He was re-elected from the same constituency again in 1998 and 1999. In 1999 he defeated the renowned Malayalam film Actor Murali with a considerable majority.

In 2004 he lost to K. S. Manoj of the CPI(M). In 2009, he refused to contest the elections despite persuasions from party leadership and various social circles, stating that younger politicians need to be given opportunities. On 10 February 2014, he was selected KPCC President by the High Command of the Indian National Congress. He resigned from the post on 10 March 2017, owing to health reasons although it is widely speculated that his resignation is part of a massive organizational revamp of the KPCC.

| House | Election | Constituency | Result | Majority |
|---|---|---|---|---|
| Parliament | 1977 | Alappuzha | Won | 64016 |
| Kerala Legislative Assembly | 1980 | Manalur | Won | 7932 |
| Kerala Legislative Assembly | 1982 | Manalur | Won | 2538 |
| Kerala Legislative Assembly | 1987 | Manalur | Won | 6187 |
| Kerala Legislative Assembly | 1991 | Manalur | Won | 5516 |
| Parliament | 1996 | Alappuzha | Won | 25949 |
| Parliament | 1998 | Alappuzha | Won | 40637 |
| Parliament | 1999 | Alappuzha | Won | 35094 |
| Parliament | 2004 | Alappuzha | Lost | 1009 |

== Positions held ==
- 1971-73 President, Kerala Students’ Union
- 1975-77 President, Kerala Pradesh Youth Congress
- 1977-78 General Secretary, Indian Youth Congress
- 1977 Elected to 6th Lok Sabha
- 1980-82 Member, Kerala Legislative Assembly INC(U) E. K. Nayanar ministry
- 1982-86 Re-Elected Kerala Legislative Assembly INC(A)
- 1985-March 1987 Speaker, Kerala Legislative Assembly (K.Karunakaran Ministry)
- 1990-91 Vice-President, P.C.C., Kerala
- April 1995- May 1996 Minister of Health, Kerala (A.K.Antony Ministry)
- 1996 Re-elected to 11th Lok Sabha (2nd term)
- 1996-97 Member, Committee on Railways
- 1998 Re-elected to 12th Lok Sabha (3rd term)
- 1998-99 Member, Committee of Privileges, Committee on Human Resource Development and Convenor of its Sub-Committee-II on Medical Education, Consultative Committee, Ministry of Railways
- 1999 Re-elected to 13th Lok Sabha (4th term)
- 1999-2000 Member, Committee on Human Resource Development
- 2000-2001 Member, Committee on Ethics
- 2014-2017 KPCC President.

== Personal life ==
He was born to Vylopally Sankaran Mama and Girija at a small village named Padiyam in Anthikad on 26 May 1948. He is graduated from St. Thomas College, Thrissur. His wife is Latha Sudheeran. He has a son Sarin Sudheeran and a daughter.
