= Janakeeya Bhakshana Sala =

Free food court in Kerala, India

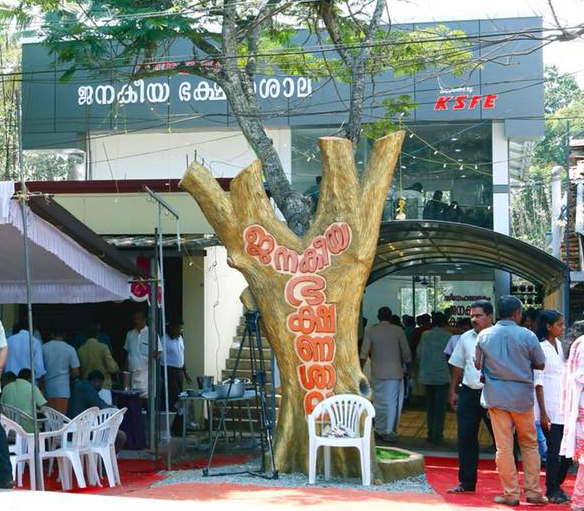
Janakeeya Bhakshana sala, Alappuzha

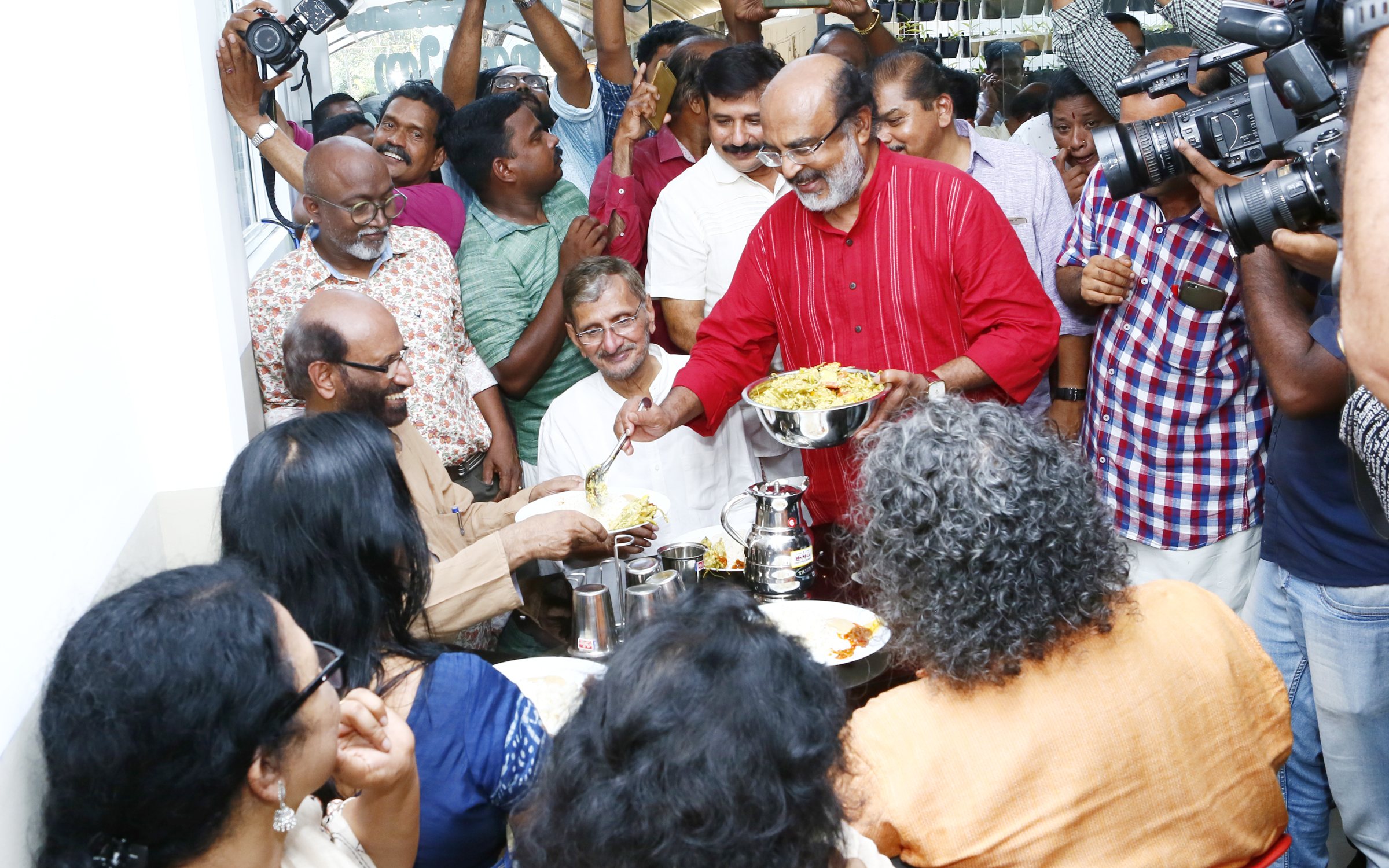
T M Thomas Isaac inaugurating People's food court

Janakeeya Bhakshana Sala is a free of cost food court run by the 'Snehajalakam' pain and palliative care unit of CPI(M) at Pathirappally in Alappuzha, Kerala. Janakeeya Bhakshana Sala literally means the people's food court and it has no cash counter. People can have food free of cost, three times a day from there. If they wish to pay for the food they had, they can put an estimated cost in a donation box placed there. The Janakeeya Bhakshana Sala is working in a two storied building on the National Highway 66 between Alappuzha and Cherthala. It was opened to the public on 3 March 2018 by Dr. T.M. Thomas Isaac, the Finance Minister of Kerala.
