= Revolutionary Socialist Party (Sreekandan Nair) =

Revolutionary Socialist Party (Sreekandan Nair) (abbreviated RSP(S)) was a political party in Kerala, India. The leader of the party was N. Sreekantan Nair.

The RSP(S) was born out of a split within the Revolutionary Socialist Party, as the pro-Congress wing broke away from RSP. The division within the RSP had brewed since 1980 Indian general election, in which N. Sreekantan Nair lost the Quilon parliamentary seat (a major defeat for the RSP, which the N. Sreekantan Nair faction blamed on the alliance with the CPI(M)). The RSP split and emergence of RSP(S) contributed to the downfall of the E.K. Nayanar ministry. One of the six RSP Members of the Legislative Assembly, K. Sivadasan sided with the RSP(S). The RSP(S) became a member of the with Indian National Congress-led United Democratic Front. RSP(S) had one minister, K. Sivadasan, in the short-lived 1981-1982 K. Karunakaran state government.

The split in the RSP also reached the trade union movement. N. Sreekantan Nair was removed from the post as president of the All Kerala Cashew Factories Workers Federation. K. Sivadasan launched a rival union with the same name, with N. Sreekantan Nair as president.

RSP(S) had four candidates in the fray in the 1982 Kerala Legislative Assembly election, out of whom one (K. Sivadasan in Quilon) was victorious. The RSP(S) candidates obtained 114,721 votes (1.2% of the statewide vote). K. Sivadasan obtained 35,387 votes (52.75%) in Quilon constituency. K.C. Vamadevan of RSP(S) obtained 28,555 votes (47.37%) in the Aryanejad constituency, finishing in second place after RSP leader K. Pankajakshan. The party retained one cabinet minister berth in the state government of 1982-1987 - K. Sivadasan as Labour Minister.

RSP(S) fielded a single candidate in the 1987 Kerala Legislative Assembly election, K. Sivadasan in Quilon constituency. K. Sivadasan suffered a humiliating defeat at the hands of a young RSP trade unionist, Babu Divakaran. K. Sivadasan obtained 29,895 votes (34.73% of the votes in the constituency).
