= A. D. Thomas =

Indian politician (born 1996)

- A. D. Thomas

Member of the Kerala Legislative Assembly
- Incumbent
- Assumed office May 21 2026
- Preceded by: P. P. Chitharanjan
- Constituency: Alappuzha

Personal details
- Born: A. D. Thomas; 1996 (age 29–30) Alappuzha, Kerala, India
- Party: Indian National Congress
- Education: • ST. Michaels College Cherthala, • Holy Family HSS Kattoor, • St. Augustine's HS Mararikulam
- Occupation: Teacher, Politician

Arasharkadavil Dominic Jackson Thomas (born 1996) is an Indian politician and educator serving as member of the legislative assembly for the Alappuzha constituency. Elected in the 2026 Kerala Legislative Assembly election.

== Early life and Political career ==
Thomas was born to Arasharkadavil Dominic Jackson and Akkamma in the Coastal Village of Mararikulam in Alappuzha district. He pursued a career in teaching after graduating. He became involved in student politics through the Kerala Students Union (KSU) and later the youth wing of the Congress party. Prior to his election, he was known for organizing youth-led community service programs and advocating for urban development in the Alappuzha municipality.

== 2026 Kerala Legislative Assembly election ==
Party	Candidate	Votes	%	±%	
	INC	A. D. Thomas	81065	51.49	+8.45
	CPI(M)	P. P. Chitharanjan	60,946	38.09	-7.18
	BJP	M. J. Job	21,833	8.04	-0.92
Margin of victory		21,208	13.61		
Total valid votes		1,47,205			
INC gain from CPI(M)		Swing	+7.82		
