= Aryad =

Aryad South Aryad
- village
- Location in Kerala, India Aryad (India)
- Coordinates: 9°31′0″N 76°19′0″E
- Country: India
- State: Kerala
- District: Alappuzha
- Taluk: Ambalappuzha

Area
  - Total: 6.87 km^{2} (2.65 sq mi)

Population (2001)
  - Total: 24,043
  - Density: 3,500/km^{2} (9,100/sq mi)

Languages
  - Official: Malayalam, English
- Time zone: UTC+5:30 (IST)
- PIN: 688542
- Vehicle registration: KL-04
- Lok Sabha constituency: Alappuzha
- Legislative assembly constituency: Alappuzha

Aryad is one of the panchayaths in Alappuzha district in the Kerala state of southern India. It is divided into two parts: Aryad North and Aryad South. Aryad South is nearer to the municipal area. Subrahmanyapuram is the southern boundary and Komalapuram is the northern boundary of Aryad Panchayath. Komalapuram is in Aryad North.

An ancient mosque called the South Aryad Juma Masjid is situated there.
