= Marari Beach =

Marari Beach Mararikulam
- city
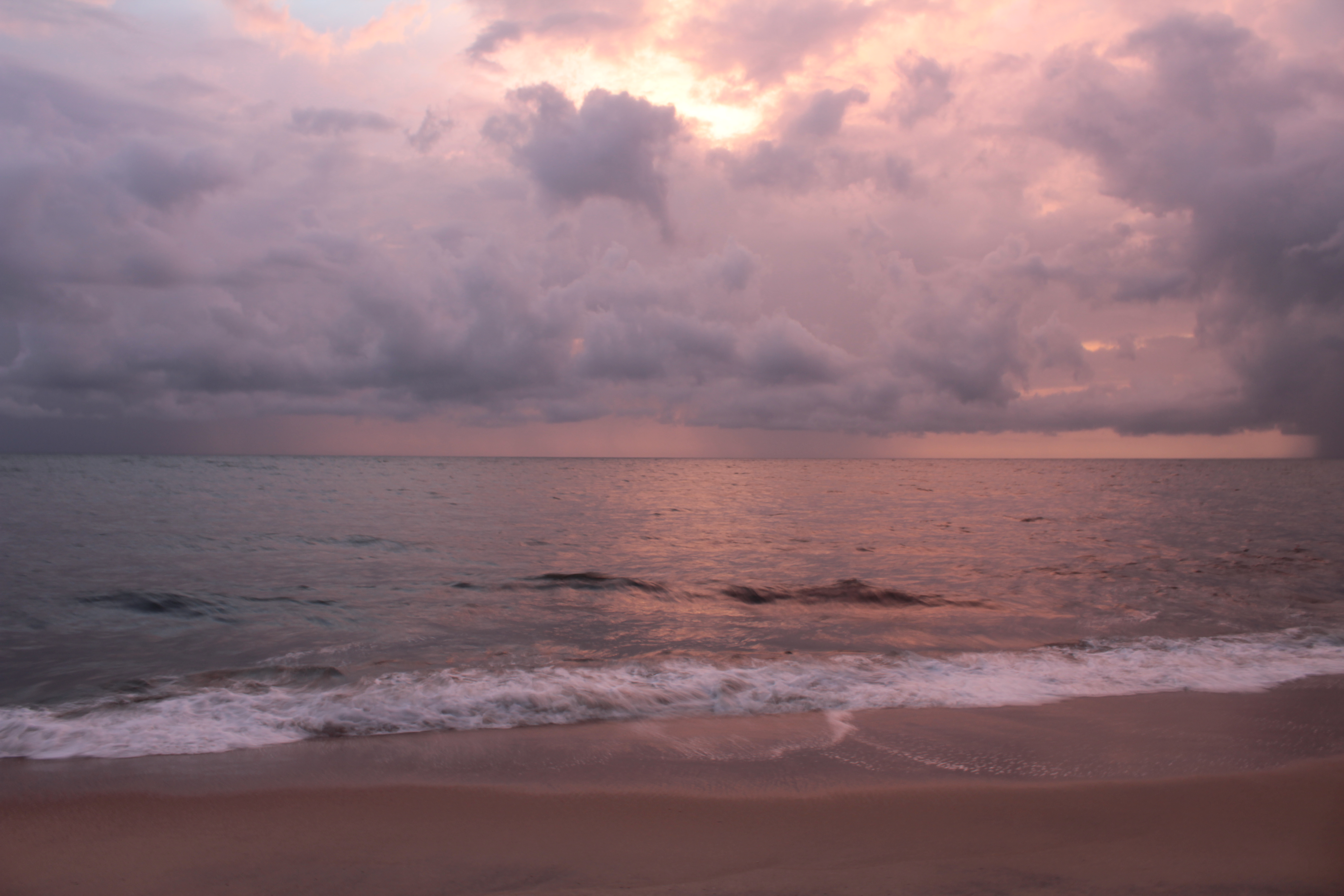
- A view of the sunset at the Marari beach

- Location in Kerala, India Marari Beach (India)
- Coordinates: 9.602527°N 76.299877°E
- Country: India
- State: Kerala
- District: Alappuzha District

Government
  - Body: Govt of Kerala

Languages
  - Official: Malayalam, English
- Time zone: UTC+5:30 (IST)
- PIN: 688549
- Telephone code: +91
- Vehicle registration: KL-04 or KL-32

Marari Beach is a beach at Mararikulam village in Alappuzha District of Kerala, India, 11 km from Alappuzha (Alleppey) town.

== Location ==
Mararikulam is connected by rail and has a railway station by the same name. It is also well connected by road. NH 66 passes through S.L.Puram, which is 5 km to the east of Mararikulam. Nearest airport is Cochin International Airport. It was rated as one of the worlds top five HAMMOCK BEACH by National Geographic survey. & The CGH Marari beach resorts has made it to the "Sense of Place" final list of National Geographic Traveller "WORLD LEGACY AWARD" by National Geographic in partnership with ITB Berlin ( https://www.nationalgeographic.com/worldlegacyawards/winners.html ). Marari Beach is being increasingly preferred by travellers as an alternative to its more popular counterpart- Kovalam in the South. Tourists can cover the key highlights of Kerala including the Port town of Cochin, the tea plantations of Munnar, the wildlife in Periyar, the houseboats on the backwaters in Alleppey and end their stay at Marari where they can enjoy the beaches before flying out of Cochin again- instead of having to travel down south to Kovalam for the beaches. The beaches in Marari are conveniently located just an hour and a half away from the Cochin international airport.

== Pictures ==
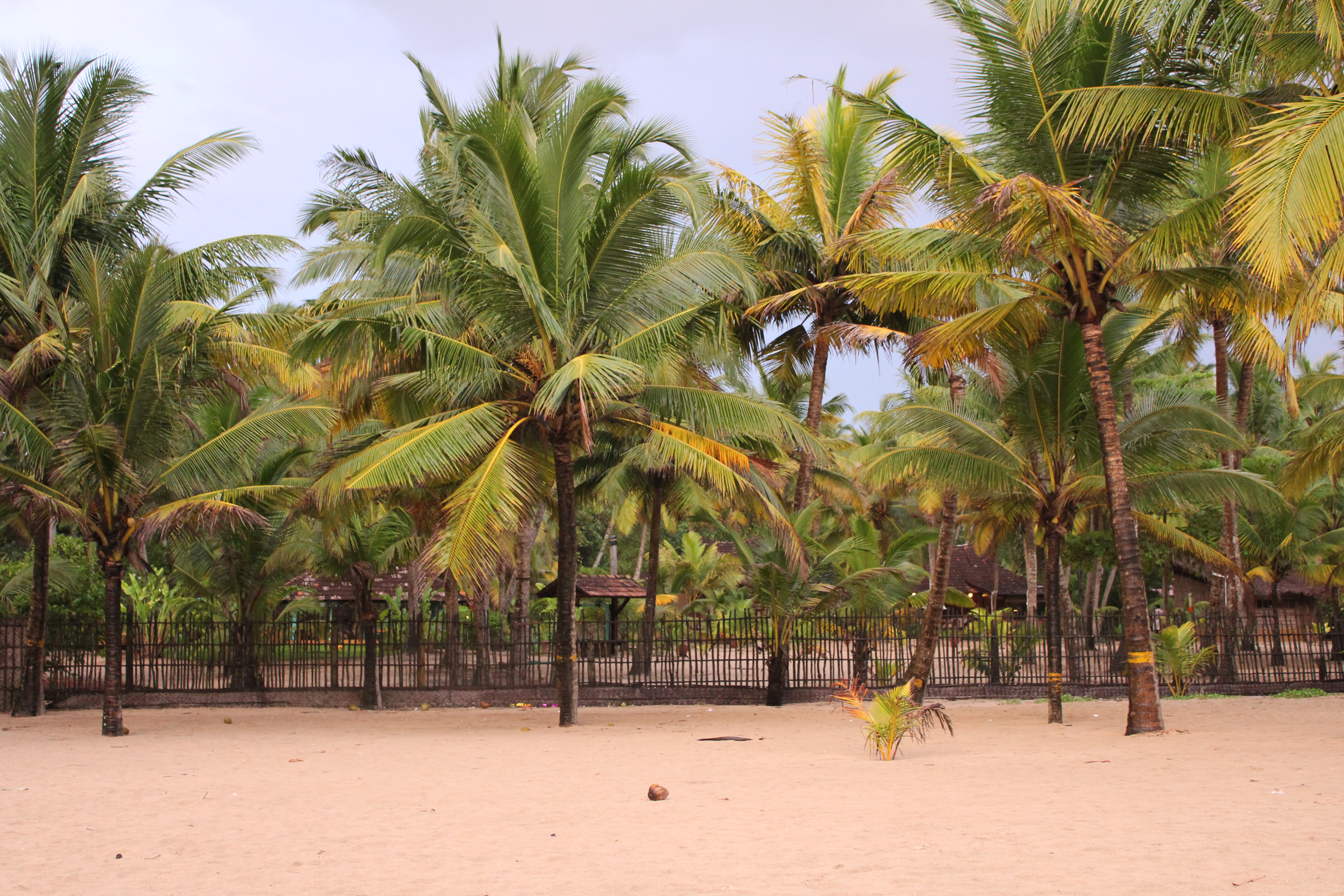
Marari beach shoreline

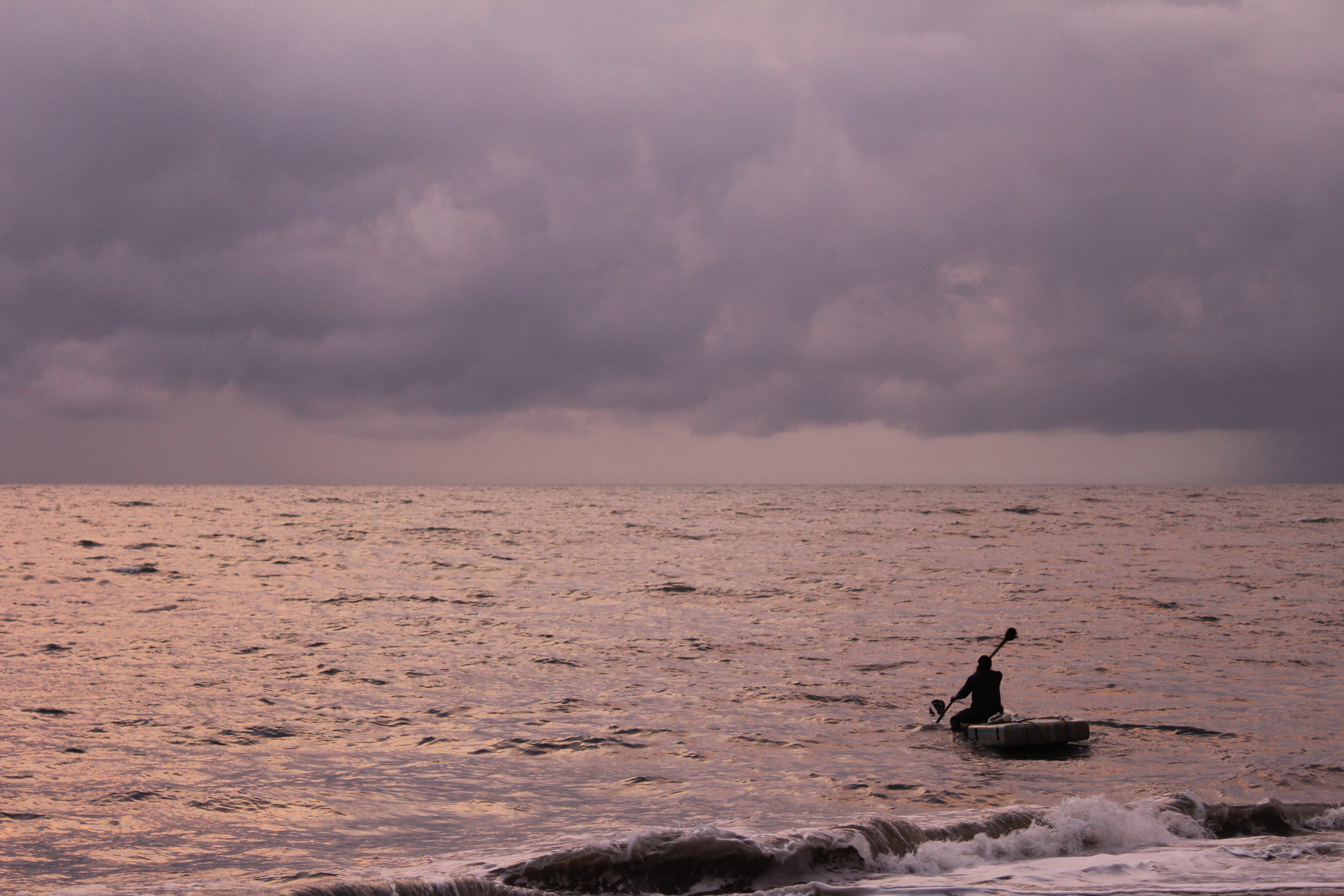
Fisherman setting off into the sunset
