= K. S. Manoj =

Indian politician (born 1965)

Member of Parliament, Lok Sabha
- In office 2004–2009
- Succeeded by: K. C. Venugopal
- Constituency: Alappuzha

Personal details
- Born: 19 April 1965 (age 61) Alappuzha, Kerala
- Party: Indian National Congress (2010-present )
- Other political affiliations: Communist Party of India (Marxist) (2004-2010), Independent (2010)
- Spouse: Susan Abraham
- Children: 1
- As of 18 March, 2009

Kurisinkal Sebastian Manoj (born 19 April 1965) is an Indian politician and physician. He hails from Kerala and was a Member of Parliament for the 14th Lok Sabha, representing Alappuzha Lok Sabha constituency as a Communist Party of India (Marxist) (CPI(M)) candidate. He won against Indian National Congress leader V. M. Sudheeran in the 2004 Indian general election in Kerala. He contested the 2009 Lok Sabha elections again from the same constituency, losing to Indian National Congress (INC) candidate K. C. Venugopal.

He resigned from CPI(M) on 9 January 2010, citing that the line of the party clashed with his religious beliefs. A rectification document produced by the party in 2009 had barred any member from practising one's religion and affirming one's belief in God. The document, a code of conduct for members that was approved by the central committee last year, says members and elected representatives “shall neither organise religious functions nor observe religious rituals”.

He joined Indian National Congress on 13 September 2010. He has been nominated as the United Democratic Front (Kerala) candidate for Alappuzha (State Assembly constituency) in the 2021 Kerala Legislative Assembly election.

Some of the most important bills presented by Manoj in the 14th Lok Sabha include "The Fishermen (Welfare) Bill 2005", "The Petrol Pump Workers (Welfare) Bill 2005" and "The Coir Factory Workers (Welfare) Bill 2006".

== Educational qualifications ==
- M.B.B.S., M.D., D.A.(Diploma in Anaesthesiology)
- Educated at T. D. Medical College, Alappuzha and Govt. Medical College, Thiruvananthapuram

== Other positions held ==
- Member, Committee on Defence
- Member, Consultative Committee, Ministry of Agriculture
- Member, Standing Committee on Defence
- Assistant Insurance Medical Officer, 1993–98
- Lecturer in Anaesthesiology, 1998–2004
- Consultant in Anaesthesiology, 2005–present
- Life Member, (i) Indian Medical Association; (ii) Indian Society of Pain and Palliative Care; (iii) Indian Society of Anaesthesiologists;
- Former State Secretary, Kerala Govt. Medical College Teachers Association
- Member, National Service Scheme
- Former President, Kerala Catholic Youth Movement (KCYM)
- Member, Academic Council, University of Kerala
- Former President Kerala Latin Catholic Association, (KLCA) Alappuzha Diocese
- Former General Secretary, Kerala Latin Catholic Association, Alappuzha Diocese
