= Komalapuram =

- village
- Location in Kerala, India
- Coordinates: 9°32′0″N 76°20′0″E
- Country: India
- State: Kerala
- District: Alappuzha

Population (2001)
  - Total: 43,281

Languages
  - Official: Malayalam, English
- Time zone: UTC+5:30 (IST)
- PIN: 688006
- Telephone code: 0477
- Lok Sabha constituency: Alappuzha
- Climate: Tropical monsoon (Köppen)
- Avg. summer temperature: 35 °C (95 °F)
- Avg. winter temperature: 20 °C (68 °F)

Komalapuram is a village in Alappuzha district in the Indian state of Kerala. It is part of Aryad panchayat. It is said that the name Komalapuram is a word combined of two words 'Komalam' and 'Puram'. Komalam is named after Mr. Komalam Shetty, a money lender who lived in the area, and 'Puram' means an area of land. Another theory is that the name is derived from the Malayalam word 'komalam', the beauty of kids and women and that the meaning of Komalapuram came from the ' Land of Beautiful Kids and Ladies'.

== Demographics ==
At the time of the 2001 India census, Komalapuram had a population of 43,281. Men constituted 49% of the population and Women 51%. Komalapuram had an average literacy rate of 84%, higher than the national average of 59.5%. Male literacy was 86%, and Female literacy 82%. 11% of the population were under 6 years of age.

Year	Male	Female	Total Population	Change	Religion (%)							
Year	Male	Female	Total Population	Change	Hindu	Muslim	Christian	Sikhs	Buddhist	Jain	Other religions and persuasions	Religion not stated
2001	21027	22264	43291	-	76.09	11.48	12.39	0.00	0.00	0.00	0.00	0.03
2011	22941	24185	47126	8.86%	74.14	13.10	12.55	0.01	0.00	0.00	0.01	0.19

Komalapuram lies 4.5 km north of Alleppey town.

Komalapuram is famous for the Kaithathil Temple. Charamparambu Sree Mahadeva Temple is in Komalapuram East. The Mariyan Grotto of Aryad Church.Komalapuram juma masjid is also a major attraction of Komalapuram.

Komalapuram is accessible by routes NH 47 and Alleppey-Vaikom State highway.
