= Democratic Labour Party (Kerala) =

The Democratic Labour Party was a political party in Kerala, India. The DLP was founded in 1979, as the political wing of the Kerala Dheevar Maha Sabha (an organisation of Hindu fishermen). V. Dinakaran was the general secretary of the party.

The DLP supported the United Democratic Front (UDF). V. Dinakaran contested the 1980 elections with UDF support. In the parliamentary election, he finished in third place in the Allepey constituency with 8,814 votes (2.11%). In the Legislative Assembly election V. Dinakaran finished in second place in the Ambalappuzha constituency with 32,884 votes (47.73%).

V. Dinakaran was elected to the Kerala Legislative Assembly with UDF support in the 1982 election. He won the Ambalappuzha seat, obtaining 35,821 votes (50.93%). DLP supported the Indian National Congress-led state government formed after the election. DLP was not, however, given any ministerial post in the state government. V. Dinakaran and DLP tried to pressure the state government on political demands, as well as advocating inclusion of the party in the state government. V. Dinakaran retained the Ambalappuzha seat in the 1987 election, obtaining 41,938 votes (47.62%).

The influence of the party ebbed out after the mid-1980s, and the party suffered internal rifts. Dinakaran lost his seat in the legislature in the 1991 election (obtaining 46,617 votes, or 47.54%), and in subsequent elections DLP would no longer have a candidate in the UDF seat sharing.
