= Mararikulam =

- Village
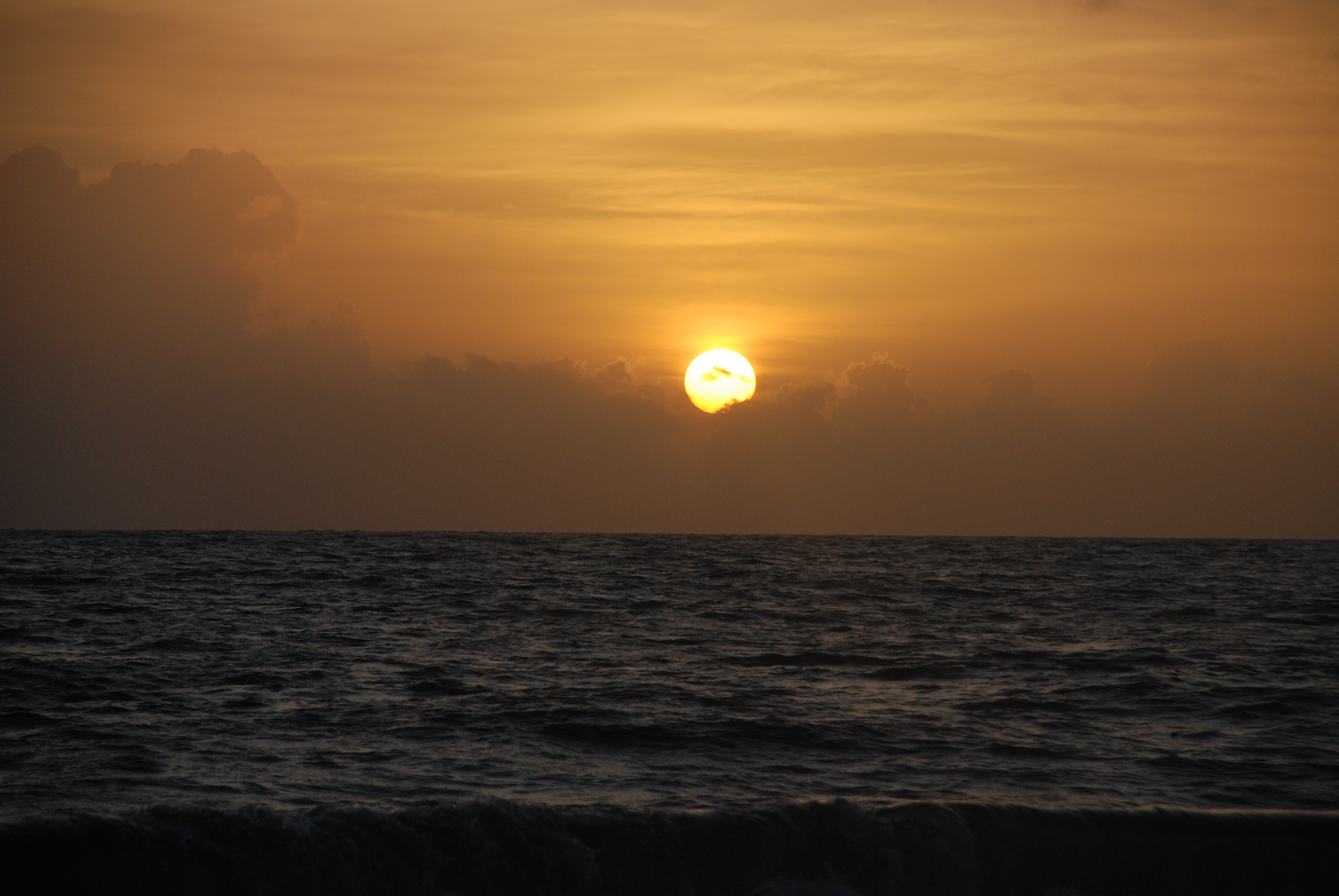
- Sunset from Mararikkulam beach
- Interactive map of Mararikulam
- Coordinates: 9°36′0″N 76°18′0″E
- Country: India
- State: Kerala
- District: Alappuzha

Languages
  - Official: Malayalam, English
- Time zone: UTC+5:30 (IST)
- PIN: 688549
- Telephone code: 0478
- Vehicle registration: KL-32, KL-04
- Nearest city: Alappuzha
- Lok Sabha constituency: Alappuzha

Mararikulam is a village in India, in the district of Alappuzha, Kerala state. Previously, it was a constituency in the Kerala Legislative Assembly, represented by legislators including T. M. Thomas Isaac, V. S. Achuthanandan, Vijayamma. S.

It is the home of former international volleyball player K. Udayakumar.

Marari Beach at Mararikulam is a notable tourist destination here.
