= P. P. Chitharanjan =

Indian politician

- പി.പി. ചിത്തരഞ്ജൻ
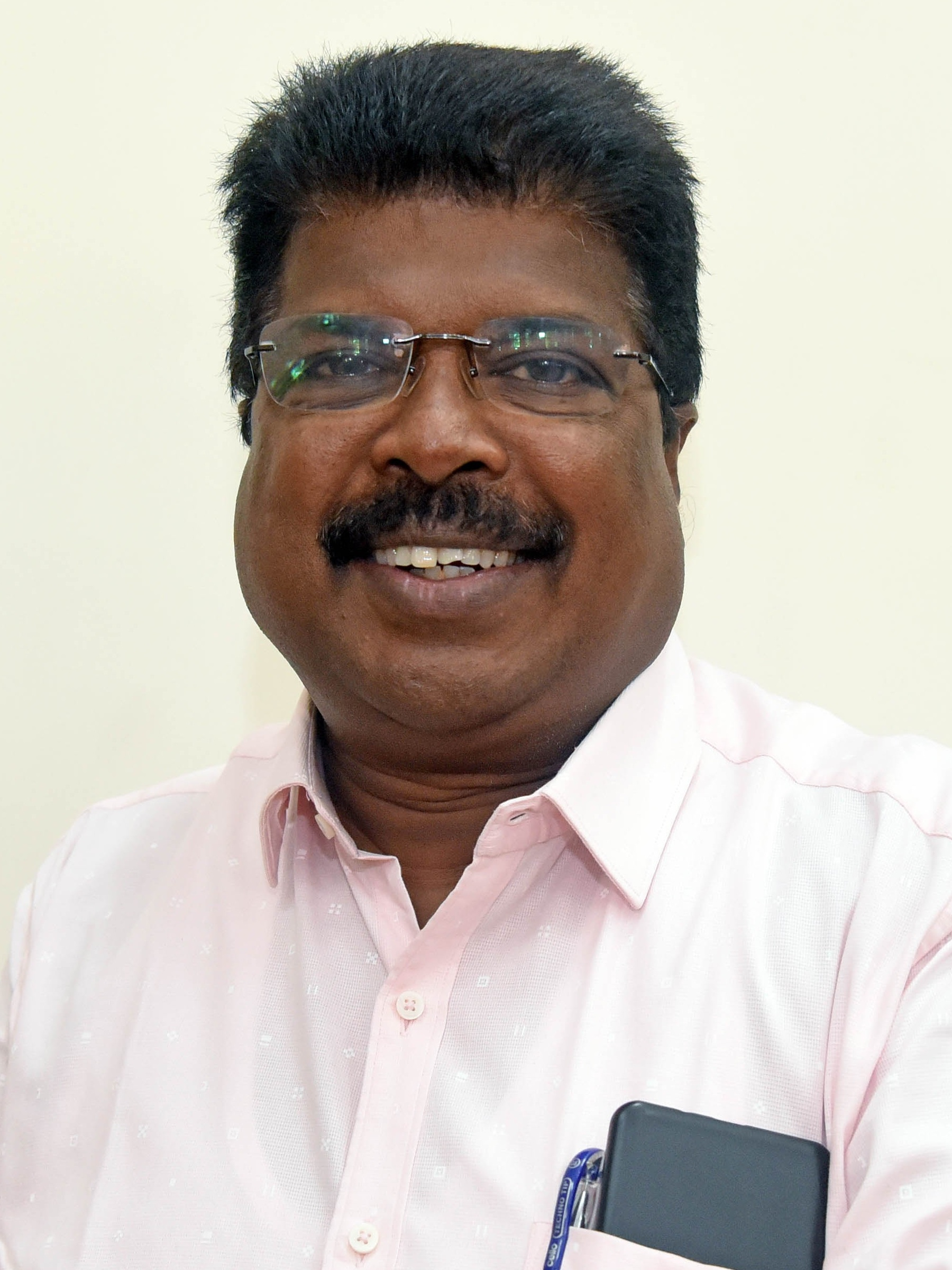

Member of the Kerala Legislative Assembly for Alappuzha
- In office May 2021 – May 2026
- Preceded by: T. M. Thomas Isaac
- Succeeded by: A. D. Thomas

Personal details
- Born: Alappuzha
- Spouse: Mini Chitharanjan
- Children: Arun Chitharanjan, Aiswarya Chitharanjan

P. P. Chitharanjan is an Indian politician who served as the MLA of Alappuzha constituency from May 2021 till May 2026.

Mr. Chitharanjan belongs to the CPIM and contested the State Assembly Elections from the Alappuzha Constituency. He won the election by beating Dr. K.S. Manoj of the INC.

Mr. Chitharanjan also served as the Board Member and Chairman of the Matsyafed which is the apex corporation in the Fisheries sectors of the state in which hundreds of smaller, regional co-operatives in the coastal sector are affiliated.
