= Mararikulam South =

Panchayat in Kerala, India

Coordinates: 09°33′49″N 76°18′33″E

Mararikulam South is a panchayat and part of Mararikulam. It is in Alappuzha district, India.
