= T. J. Anjalose =

Indian politician

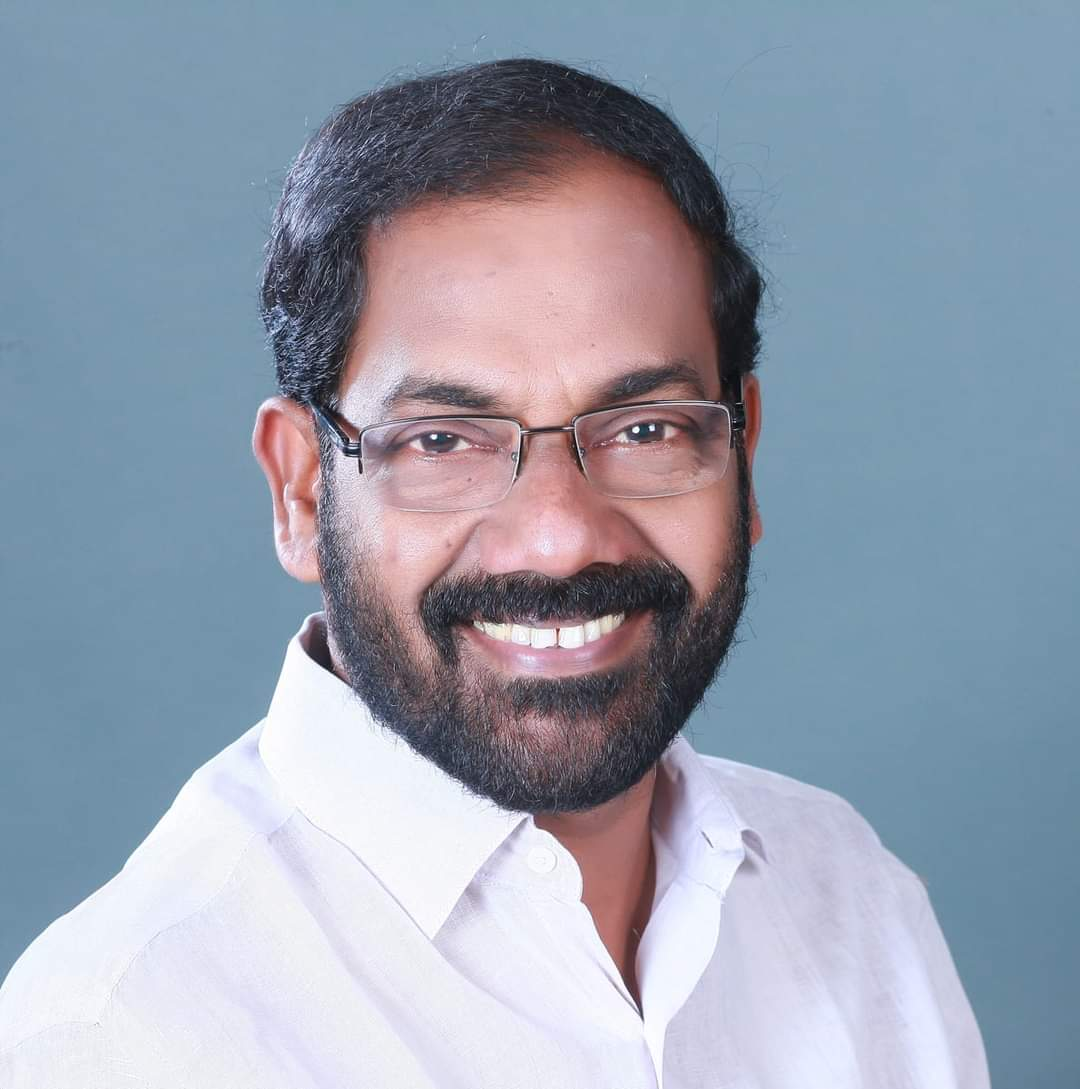
T. J. Anjalose

Thayyil John Anjalose (born 12 March 1959) is an Indian politician and leader of Communist Party of India. He was a Member of parliament representing Alappuzha Lok Sabha constituency from 1991 to 1996. He earlier served as Member of the Legislative Assembly (MLA) of Kerala from 1987 to 1991 representing the Mararikulam Assembly Constituency. Currently he is the secretary of CPI Alappuzha District Council.
