= Alappuzha Lok Sabha constituency =

Lok Sabha Constituency in Kerala

Coordinates: 9.51°N 76.34°E

Alappuzha KL-14
- Lok Sabha constituency
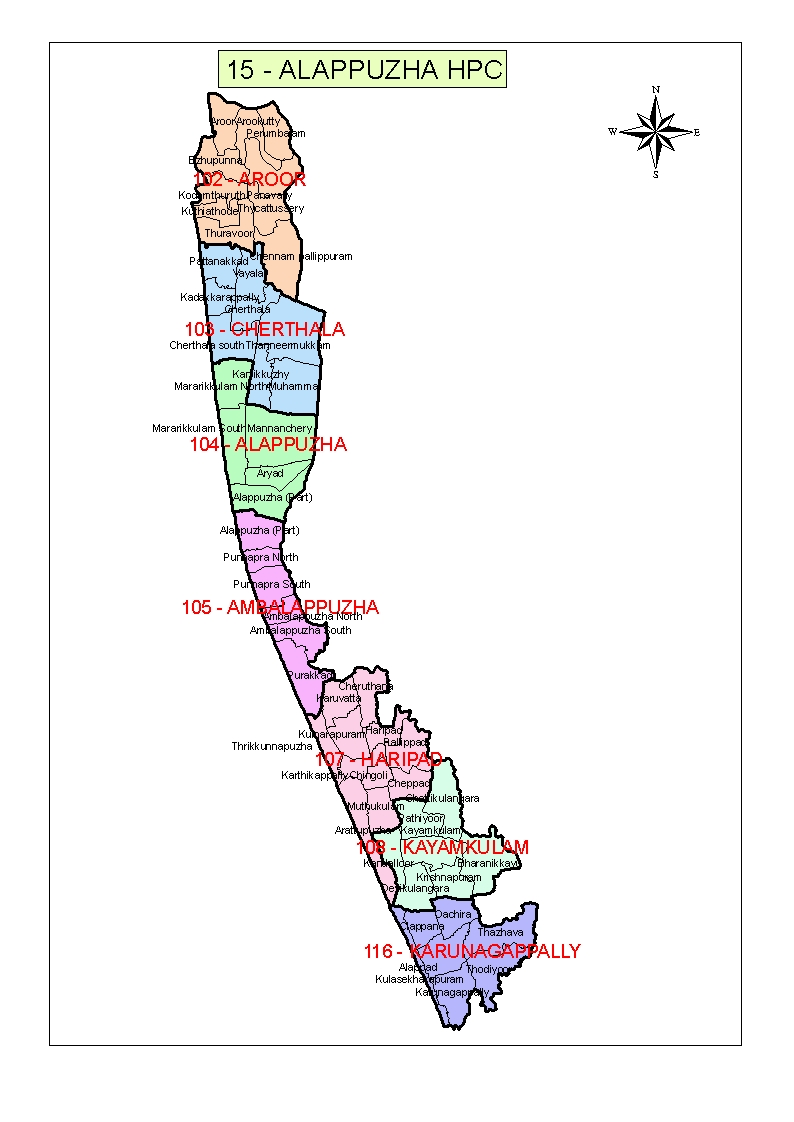
- Alappuzha Lok Sabha constituency

Constituency details
- Country: India
- Region: South India
- State: Kerala
- Assembly constituencies: Aroor; Cherthala; Alappuzha; Ambalappuzha; Haripad; Kayamkulam; Karunagappally
- Established: 1962
- Reservation: None

Member of Parliament
- 18th Lok Sabha
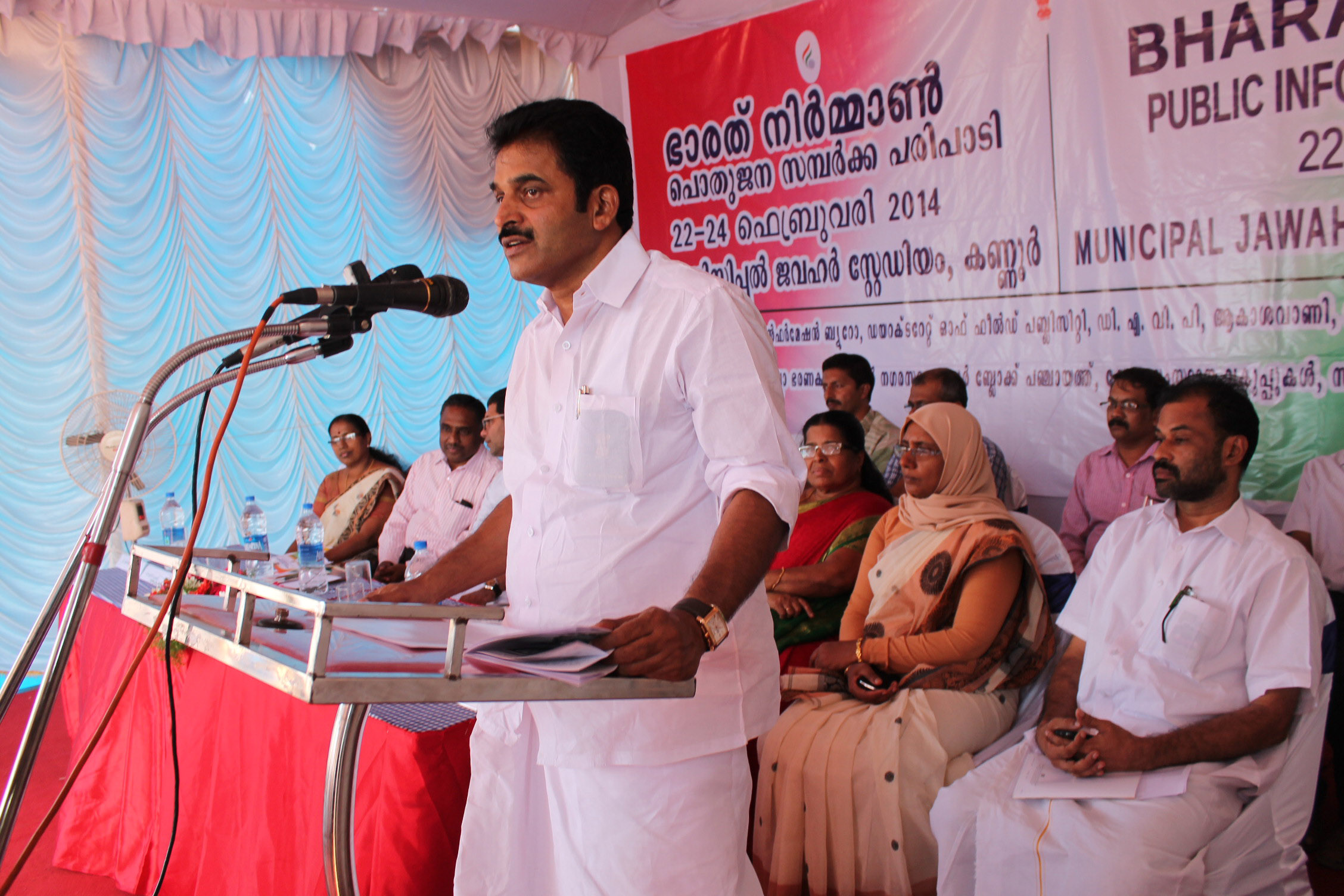
- Incumbent K. C. Venugopal
- Party: INC
- Alliance: UDF
- Elected year: 2024

Alappuzha Lok Sabha constituency is one of the 20 Lok Sabha (parliamentary) constituencies in Kerala state in southern India.

== Assembly segments ==
Alappuzha Lok Sabha constituency is composed of the following assembly segments:

No	Name	District	Member (2026)	Party	2024 Lead
102	Aroor	Alappuzha	Shanimol Osman	INC	INC
103	Cherthala	Alappuzha	P. Prasad	CPI	INC
104	Alappuzha	Alappuzha	A. D. Thomas	INC	INC
105	Ambalappuzha	Alappuzha	G. Sudhakaran	Independent	INC
106	Haripad	Alappuzha	Ramesh Chennithala	INC	INC
108	Kayamkulam	Alappuzha	M. Liju	INC	INC
116	Karunagappally	Kollam	C. R. Mahesh	INC	INC

Former Assembly Segments

- 97. Aroor
- 98. Cherthala
- 99. Mararikulam
- 100. Alappuzha
- 101. Ambalappuzha
- 102. Kuttanad
- 103. Haripad

After the Delimitation Kayamkulam and Karunagappally were added & Kuttanad were moved to Mavelikkara Loksabha Constituency.

== Members of Parliament ==
As Alleppey in Travancore-Cochin

Most Successful parties from Alappuzha Lok Sabha
1. INC (8 Times) (47.0%)
2. CPI(M) (5 Times) (29.4%)
3. CPI (3 Times) (17.6%)
4. RSP (1 Times) (5.88%)

Election	Lok Sabha	Member	Party	Tenure
1952	1st	P.T. Punnoose	Communist Party of India	1952-1957

As Ambalappuzha

Election	Lok Sabha	Member	Party	Tenure
1957	2nd	P.T. Punnoose	Communist Party of India	1957-1962
1962	3rd	P. K. Vasudevan Nair	Communist Party of India	1962-1967
1967	4th	Susheela Gopalan	Communist Party of India (Marxist)	1967-1971
1971	5th	K. Balakrishnan	Revolutionary Socialist Party	1971-1977

As Alappuzha

Election	Lok Sabha	Member	Party	Tenure
1977	6th	V. M. Sudheeran	Indian National Congress	1977-1980
1980	7th	Susheela Gopalan	Communist Party of India (Marxist)	1980-1984
1984	8th	Vakkom Purushothaman	Indian National Congress	1984-1989
1989	9th	Vakkom Purushothaman	Indian National Congress	1989-1991
1991	10th	T. J. Anjalose	Communist Party of India (Marxist)	1991-1996
1996	11th	V. M. Sudheeran	Indian National Congress	1996-1998
1998	12th	V. M. Sudheeran	Indian National Congress	1998-1999
1999	13th	V. M. Sudheeran	Indian National Congress	1999-2004
2004	14th	K. S. Manoj	Communist Party of India (Marxist)	2004-2009
2009	15th	K. C. Venugopal	Indian National Congress	2009-2014
2014	16th	K. C. Venugopal	Indian National Congress	2014-2019
2019	17th	A. M. Ariff	Communist Party of India (Marxist)	2019-2024
2024	18th	K. C. Venugopal	Indian National Congress	Incumbent

== Election results ==
=== General Elections 2029 ===
2029 Indian general election: Alappuzha
Party	Candidate	Votes	%	±%
UDF				
LDF				
NDA				
NOTA	None of the above			
Margin of victory				
Turnout				
		Swing		

=== General Election 2024 ===
2024 Indian general election: Alappuzha
Party	Candidate	Votes	%	±%
INC	K.C. Venugopal	404,560	38.21	▼1.80
CPI(M)	A. M. Ariff	3,41,047	32.21	▼8.76
BJP	Sobha Surendran	2,99,648	28.30	▲11.06
NOTA	None of the above	7,365	0.70	▲0.14
BSP	Muraleedharan Koncherillam	1,626	0.15	▼0.07
SUCI(C)	R. Arjunan	1,319	0.12	▲0.02
Independent	Adv. K. M. Shahjahan	682	0.06	−
Independent	Vayalar Rajeevan	675	0.06	0
Independent	Shahjahan V. A.	576	0.05	−
Independent	Satheesh Shenoi	482	0.05	▼0.02
Independent	Jayakrishnan P.	385	0.04	−
Independent	Jyothi Abraham	338	0.03	−
Majority		63,513	6.00	▲5.04
Turnout		10,68,949	75.99	▼4.36
INC gain from CPI(M)		Swing		

By Assembly Segments
No.	Status (Assembly Constituency)	Votes			Lead
No.	Status (Assembly Constituency)	INC (UDF)	CPI(M) (LDF)	BJP (NDA)	Lead
102	Aroor	60,978	49,962	37,491	11,016
103	Cherthala	62,701	61,858	40,474	843
104	Alappuzha	65,718	47,300	35,594	18,418
105	Ambalappuzha	52,212	37,657	37,547	14,555
107	Haripad	48,466	41,769	47,121	1,345
108	Kayamkulam	50,216	48,020	48,775	1,441
116	Karunagappally	57,955	49,030	48,839	8,925

=== General election 2019 ===
According to Election Commission, there are 13,14,535 registered voters in Alappuzha Constituency for 2019 Lok Sabha Election.

2019 Indian general elections: Alappuzha
Party	Candidate	Votes	%	±%
CPI(M)	A. M. Ariff	445,981	40.96	▼3.41
INC	Shanimol Usman	4,35,496	40.00	▼6.31
BJP	Dr. K. S. Radhakrishnan	1,87,729	17.24	−
NOTA	None of the above	6,065	0.56	▼0.58
SDPI	K. S. Shan	3,595	0.33	▼0.81
BSP	Adv. Prashant Bhim	2,431	0.22	▼0.12
API	A. Akhilesh	1,782	0.16	−
PDP	Varkala Raj	1,689	0.15	−
SUCI(C)	R. Parthasarathy Varma	1,113	0.10	▼0.50
Independent	Satheesh Shenoi	783	0.07	−
Independent	Santhosh Thuravoor	749	0.07	−
Independent	Vayalar Rajeevan	696	0.06	−
Independent	Thahir	571	0.05	−
Margin of victory		10,474	0.96	▼0.99
Turnout		10,90,112	80.35	▲1.50
CPI(M) gain from INC		Swing		

By Assembly Segments
No.	Status (Assembly Constituency)	Votes			Lead
No.	Status (Assembly Constituency)	CPI(M) (LDF)	INC (UDF)	BJP (NDA)	Lead
102	Aroor	65,008	65,656	25,250	648
103	Cherthala	83,221	66,326	22,655	16,895
104	Alappuzha	65,759	65,828	21,303	69
105	Ambalappuzha	52,521	53,159	25,061	638
107	Haripad	55,601	61,445	26,238	5,844
108	Kayamkulam	62,370	58,073	31,660	4,297
116	Karunagappally	58,523	63,303	34,111	4,780

=== General election 2014 ===
2014 Indian general elections: Alappuzha
Party	Candidate	Votes	%	±%
INC	K. C. Venugopal	462,525	46.31	▼5.31
CPI(M)	C. B. Chandrababu	4,43,118	44.37	▼0.90
RSP(B)	A. V. Thamarakshan	43,051	4.31	▲2.11
NOTA	None of the above	11,338	1.14	−−−
SDPI	Thulaseedharan Pallikkal	10,993	1.10	N/A
AAP	D. Mohanan	9,414	0.94	N/A
SUCI(C)	Adv. M. A. Bindu	5,921	0.60	N/A
BSP	P. V. Natesan	3,385	0.34	▼0.19
Independent	Venugopal P. C.	3,149	0.31	N/A
Independent	Chandrababu G.	1,615	0.16	N/A
Independent	T. S. Balakrishnan	1,363	0.14	N/A
Independent	S. B. Basheer	709	0.07	N/A
Independent	Jayachandran Sarasamma	481	0.05	N/A
Independent	M. M. Paulose	402	0.04	N/A
Margin of victory		19,407	1.95	▼4.40
Turnout		9,97,464	78.85	▼0.55
INC hold		Swing	▼5.31	

By Assembly Segments
No.	Status (Assembly Constituency)	Votes			Lead
No.	Status (Assembly Constituency)	INC (UDF)	CPI(M) (LDF)	RSP(B) (NDA)	Lead
102	Aroor	66,584	65,621	6,907	963
103	Cherthala	76,747	75,398	6,149	1,349
104	Alappuzha	70,206	62,507	3,827	7,699
105	Ambalappuzha	54,553	51,316	5,454	3,237
107	Haripad	66,687	57,822	4,794	8,865
108	Kayamkulam	62,662	65,948	6,442	3,286
116	Karunagappally	63,662	62,959	9,433	703

=== General election 2009 ===
2009 Indian general elections: Alappuzha
Party	Candidate	Votes	%	±%
INC	K.C. Venugopal	468,679	51.44	▲5.50
CPI(M)	Dr. K. S. Manoj	4,11,044	45.11	▼0.96
NDA	Sony P. Kalyankumar	19,711	2.20	▼3.83
BSP	K. S. Prasad	4,813	0.53	
Independent	S. Seethilal	2,705	0.30	
JD(U)	P. J. Kurian	1,025	0.11	▼0.25
Margin of victory		57,635	6.33	▲6.19
Turnout		9,11,120	79.42	▲4.42
INC gain from CPI(M)		Swing	▲5.50	

By Assembly Segments
No.	Status (Assembly Constituency)	Votes			Lead
No.	Status (Assembly Constituency)	INC (UDF)	CPI(M) (LDF)	IND (NDA)	Lead
102	Aroor	69,268	58,579	3,947	10,689
103	Cherthala	78,739	71,204	3,753	7,535
104	Alappuzha	73,321	57,418	1,957	15,903
105	Ambalappuzha	58,019	46,282	2,460	11,737
107	Haripad	62,107	56,149	2,141	5,958
108	Kayamkulam	62,540	59,581	2,708	2,959
116	Karunagappally	63,024	60,014	2,713	3,010

=== General election 2004 ===
2004 Indian general elections: Alappuzha
Party	Candidate	Votes	%	±%
CPI(M)	Dr. K. S. Manoj	335,494	46.07	
INC	V. M. Sudheeran	3,34,485	45.94	
BJP	Adv. V. Padmanabhan	43,891	6.03	
Independent	V. S. Sudheeran	8,282	1.14	
JD(U)	P. J. Kurian	2,642	0.36	
Independent	V. I. Bose	2,291	0.31	
SUCI(C)	Parthasarathy Varma	2,024	0.28	
Independent	T. A. Krishnankutty	987	0.13	
Margin of victory		1,009	0.14	
Turnout		7,28,156	75.00	
CPI(M) gain from INC		Swing		

By Assembly Segments (2004)

No.	Constituency	Party	Lead
97	Aroor	INC	7,615
98	Cherthala	CPI(M)	1,822
99	Mararikkulam	CPI(M)	7,423
100	Alappuzha	INC	1,489
101	Ambalappuzha	CPI(M)	2,835
102	Kuttanad	INC	1,003
103	Haripad	INC	1,243

=== General Election 1999 ===
1999 Indian general elections: Alappuzha
Party	Candidate	Votes	%	±%
INC	V. M. Sudheeran	392,700	49.79	
CPI(M)	Muraleedharan Pillai	3,57,606	45.34	
BJP	T. Parameswaran Nair	27,682	3.51	
Democratic Labour Party (Kerala)	K. M. Balanandan	6,422	0.81	
CPI(ML)L	C. K. Sajeev	2,218	0.28	
SUCI(C)	Mini K. Philip	947	0.12	
Independent	Niranam Rajan	695	0.09	
Independent	Ashok Kumar	506	0.06	
Margin of victory		35,094	4.45	
Turnout		7,88,766	76.31	
INC hold		Swing		

By Assembly Segments (1999)

No.	Constituency	Party	Lead
97	Aroor	INC	9,428
98	Cherthala	INC	3,223
99	Mararikkulam	INC	2,084
100	Alappuzha	INC	14,044
101	Ambalappuzha	INC	3,865
102	Kuttanad	INC	599
103	Haripad	INC	1,141

=== General Elections 1998 ===
1998 Indian general election: Alappuzha
Party	Candidate	Votes	%	±%
INC	V. M. Sudheeran	386,180	50.81	
CPI(M)	Sujatha Baby	345,543	45.46	
BJP	Radhamma Satheeshan	27,010	3.55	
Independent	Shaila K. John	1,307	0.17	
Margin of victory		40,637	5.35	
Turnout		7,60,040	76.82	
INC hold		Swing		

=== General Elections 1996 ===
1996 Indian general election: Alappuzha
Party	Candidate	Votes	%	±%
INC	V. M. Sudheeran	369,539	49.71	
CPI(M)	T. J. Anjalose	343,590	46.22	
BJP	Nedunthara Unnikrishnan	17,990	2.42	
PDP	Melpadam Gopi	4,756	0.64	
Independent	Babu Raman	2,908	0.39	
Independent	K. K. Sudevan	2,839	0.38	
Independent	V. Venugopal	1,196	0.16	
Independent	Siraj	541	0.07	
Margin of victory		25,949	3.49	
Turnout		7,43,359	76.38	
INC gain from CPI(M)		Swing		

=== General Elections 1991 ===
1991 Indian general election: Alappuzha
Party	Candidate	Votes	%	±%
CPI(M)	T. J. Anjalose	364,794	49.60	
INC	Vakkom Purushothaman	350,719	47.68	
BJP	V. S. Vijayakumar	15,973	2.17	
Independent	V. Venugopal	2,170	0.30	
Independent	Mohammad Abdul Khader	691	0.09	
Independent	M. Mohanan Madhavan	610	0.08	
Independent	V. Chellappan Pillai	562	0.08	
Margin of victory		14,075	1.92	
Turnout		7,35,519	77.88	
CPI(M) gain from INC		Swing		

=== General Elections 1989 ===
1989 Indian general election: Alappuzha
Party	Candidate	Votes	%	±%
INC	Vakkom Purushothaman	375,763	50.31	
CPI(M)	K. V. Devadas	350,640	46.95	
BJP	K. D. Ramakrishnan	15,127	2.03	
JP	P. J. Antony	2,300	0.31	
Independent	V. Venugopal	2,151	0.29	
Independent	K. Kunjampi Udhalapuzha	858	0.11	
Margin of victory		25,123	3.36	
Turnout		7,46,839	83.89	
INC hold		Swing		

=== General Elections 1984 ===
1984 Indian general election: Alappuzha
Party	Candidate	Votes	%	±%
INC	Vakkom Purushothaman	303,702	51.95	
CPI(M)	Susheela Gopalan	265,968	45.49	
Independent	M. S. Prasanna	10,465	1.79	
Independent	Benjamin	1,835	0.31	
Independent	K. K. Krishnan	1,358	0.23	
Independent	Ammunni	1,308	0.22	
Margin of victory		37,764	6.46	
Turnout		5,84,666	83.60	
INC gain from CPI(M)		Swing		

=== General Elections 1980 ===
1980 Indian general election: Alappuzha
Party	Candidate	Votes	%	±%
CPI(M)	Susheela Gopalan	260,754	62.29	
JP	Omana Pillai	145,990	34.88	
Independent	V. Dinakaran	8,814	2.11	
Independent	P. K. Kunhan	3,038	0.73	
Margin of victory		1,14,764	27.41	
Turnout		4,18,596	64.76	
CPI(M) gain from INC		Swing		

=== General Elections 1977 ===
1977 Indian general election: Alappuzha
Party	Candidate	Votes	%	±%
INC	V. M. Sudheeran	270,451	56.71	
CPI(M)	E. Balanandam	206,435	43.29	
Margin of victory		64,016	13.42	
Turnout		4,76,886	82.22	
INC win (new seat)				

== See also ==
- Alappuzha
- List of constituencies of the Lok Sabha
- Indian general election, 2014 (Kerala)
- 2014 Indian general election
