= BDP =

BDP may refer to:

- BDP Quadrangle, Canadian architects
- Boogie Down Productions, hip hop group
- BrickLink Designer Program, a crowdfunding program
- Building Design Partnership, UK architects
- Bund der Pfadfinderinnen und Pfadfinder (BdP), German Scouting and Guiding organisation

== Political parties ==
- Botswana Democratic Party, the governing political party in Botswana from 1966 to 2024
- Conservative Democratic Party (German: Bürgerlich-Demokratische Partei), a political party in Switzerland
- British Democratic Party (1979), a defunct far-right political party in the United Kingdom
- British Democratic Party (2013), an active far-right political party in the United Kingdom
- Peace and Democracy Party (Turkish: Barış ve Demokrasi Partisi), a mainly Kurdish political party in Turkey existing from 2008 to 2014.

== Science, technology, and medicine ==
- Bandwidth-delay product, the product of a data link's capacity and its round-trip delay time
- 1,3-Benzodioxolylpentanamine, a possible entactogen drug
