= Aryad South =

- village
- Location in Kerala, India Aryad South (India)
- Coordinates: 9°30′0″N 76°20′0″E
- Country: India
- State: Kerala
- District: Alappuzha
- Talukas: Ambalappuzha

Government
  - Type: Panchayati raj (India)
  - Body: Gram panchayat

Languages
  - Official: Malayalam, English
- Time zone: UTC+5:30 (IST)
- PIN: 6XXXXX
- Vehicle registration: KL-
- Lok Sabha constituency: Alappuzha
- Vidhan Sabha constituency: Mararikulam

Aryad South is a village in Alappuzha district in the state of Kerala, India.
