= Mararikulam North =

- Panchayat
- Location in Kerala, India
- Coordinates: 9°36′25″N 76°18′52″E
- Country: India
- State: Kerala
- District: Alappuzha

Government
  - Sarpanch (Panchayat President): Smt. SudarsanBai K
  - MLA: P P Chitaranjan
- Elevation: 5 m (16 ft)

Languages
  - Official: Malayalam, English
- Time zone: UTC+5:30 (IST)
- PIN: 688 549
- Telephone code: 91-(0)478-XXXX XXXX

Mararikulam North is a Gram Panchayat in Alapuzha, Kerala, India. Located on the coast of Arabian Sea, towards the northern end of south Kerala.

== Etymology ==
The name Mararikulam is derived from the name of the main deity at the temple in the area, Lord Shiva. The deity is believed to reside in the temple in the form of Marari, or the enemy of Kamadeva who is also referred as Maran which is also one of his arrows.

== Geography ==
Mararikulam North lies in the southern Region of the South Indian state, Kerala. It is located on the coast of the Arabian Sea, at an average elevation of 2.5 m (8 ft). It is positioned at .

=== Climate ===
The climate is tropical and the average monthly temperature is around 25 C. Summer usually begins in March and Lasts through May and are warm and humid. The region receives two seasons of Monsoons in a year the first from June to September, and the Other In October and November. Winter is relatively non-existent, other than the climate getting drier in December through February.

== Travel ==
=== Air ===
The nearest airport is Cochin International Airport which is at a distance of 75 Kilometers .

=== Rail ===
Mararikulam North is connected via rail to different parts of the country. The railway station is Mararikulam with stops for all local (passenger shuttles) trains and three express trains. Thiruvizha halt railway station is located near northern border of the Panchayath.

=== Road ===
The National Highway No 66 formerly NH 47 passes along the eastern border of Mararikulam North. The main bus stop is Kanjikuzhi (SL Puram). Thiruvizha, Kanichukulangara, SN College and Mararikulam Kalithatt Jn are other main junctions in National Highway. Alappuzha - Fort Cochin Coastal state Highway and Cherthala-Kanichukulangara-Maraikkulam Market Road are also passes through this Panchayath.
