= T. M. Thomas Isaac =

Indian politician and economist

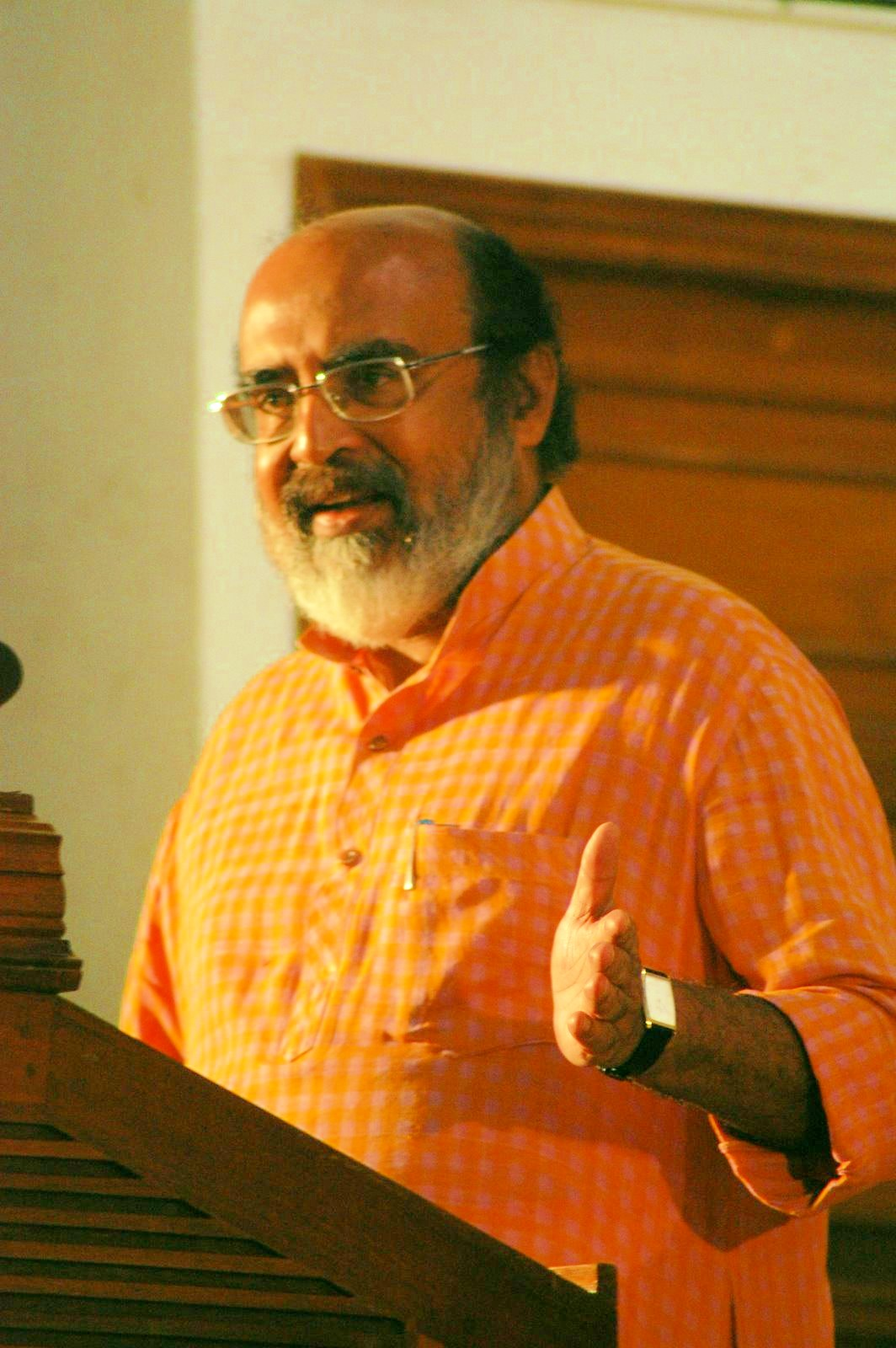

Minister for Finance, Government of Kerala
- In office 25 May 2016 – 3 May 2021
- Chief minister: Pinarayi Vijayan
- Preceded by: K. M. Mani (Note: For Finance)
- Succeeded by: K. N. Balagopal
- In office 18 May 2006 – 16 May 2011
- Chief minister: V. S. Achuthanandan
- Preceded by: K. Sankaranarayanan
- Succeeded by: K. M. Mani

Minister for Coir, Government of Kerala
- In office 25 May 2016 – 3 May 2021
- Preceded by: Adoor Prakash
- Succeeded by: P. Rajeeve

Member of the Kerala Legislative Assembly
- In office 23 May 2011 – 3 May 2021
- Preceded by: A. A. Shukoor
- Succeeded by: P. P. Chitharanjan
- Constituency: Alappuzha
- In office 16 May 2001 – 13 May 2011
- Preceded by: PJ Francis
- Succeeded by: Constituency abolished
- Constituency: Mararikulam

Personal details
- Born: 26 September 1952 (age 74) Kodungallur, Travancore–Cochin, India (Note: Present-day: Kottappuram, Kodungallur, Kerala, India)
- Party: Communist Party of India (Marxist)
- Spouse: Nata Duvvury (div. 1996)
- Children: 2
- Education: University of Kerala (BA, MA); Jawaharlal Nehru University (MPhil); Centre for Development Studies (PhD)
- Occupation: Economist, Politician
- Website: thomasisaac.in

Travancore Mathew Thomas Isaac (born 26 September 1952) is an Indian author and economist who was the Minister for Finance and Coir of the Indian state of Kerala. A central committee member of the Communist Party of India (Marxist), he has authored a number of articles on economics, planning and politics, has published in leading regional, national and international periodicals, presented lectures and papers in National and International Conferences and seminars. Isaac is the author of more than 50 books, both in Malayalam and English.

He represented the Mararikkulam (2001 - 2011) and Alappuzha (2011 - 2021). During his tenure as a member of the Kerala State Planning Board, he was in charge of the Peoples Planning in Kerala. He also served as the Finance Minister of Kerala from 2006 to 2011 and 2016 to 2021. He was LDF Candidate in Pathanamthitta Lok Sabha Constituency at 2024 general election.

== Biography ==
The son of T. P. Mathew and Saramma Mathew, Isaac obtained a PhD from the Centre for Development Studies. His PhD thesis is titled Class Struggle and Industrial Structure: A Study of Coir Weaving Industry in Kerala 1859 - 1980. While a student, he became involved in student politics, being involved with the Students Federation of India (SFI), an organisation which is politically linked with the Communist Party of India (Marxist). He has held posts in the SFI at college, district and state level.

Isaac was a professor at the Centre for Development Studies, Thiruvananthapuram and has published a number of articles and books.

Isaac is divorced from his wife Nata Duvvury who is currently a senior lecturer at University of Galway in Ireland. They have two daughters: Sara Duvisac, and Dora Duvisac.

== Works ==
=== English ===
1. Science for Social Revolution: The Experience of Kerala Shastra Sahithya Parishad With B. Ekbal (1989)
2. Democracy at work in an Indian industrial cooperative: the story of Kerala Dinesh Beedi With Richard W. Franke and Pyaralal Raghavan. Ithaca: Cornell University Press. 1998
3. Kalliasseri experiment in local level planning With P. V. Unnikrishnan, T. Gangadharan, Sreekumar Chathopadhya, Lalitha Bhai Sathyan, and Ajay Kumar Varma. Trivandrum: Centre for Development Studies. Monograph Series: Kerala Research Programme on Local Level Development.1995
4. Modernisation and employment: the coir industry in Kerala. With R. A. Van Stuijvenberg and K. N. Nair. Indo-Dutch Studies on Development Alternatives 10. New Delhi: SAGE Publications. 1992
5. Local Democracy and Development: People's campaign for decentralised planning in Kerala with Richard W. Franke. New Delhi: LeftWord Books. 2000
6. Building Alternatives: The Story of India's Oldest Construction Workers' Cooperative with Michelle Williams. New Delhi: LeftWord Books. 2017.

=== Malayalam ===
1. The Withering Coconut (1985)
2. Political Economy of Poverty (1985)
3. Economics Crisis in the Capitalist World (1987)
4. ABC of Political Economy (1987)
5. The World Bank and IMF (1988)
6. Kerala: Land and Man (1988) [Won the Kerala Sahitya Akademi Award for Scholarly Literature in 1989]
7. Political Economy of Surrender (1992)
8. Peoples Planning: Theory and Practice (1998)
9. Peoples Planning: Questions and Answers (1998)
10. Construction of False Consent : Critique of Malayalam Media 2000 - 2010 (with N. P. Chandrasekharan)
