= 1982 Kerala Legislative Assembly election =

1982 Kerala state assembly election
- 19 May 1982

All 140 seats in the Kerala Legislative Assembly 71 seats needed for a majority
- Turnout: 73.51% (▲1.28%)
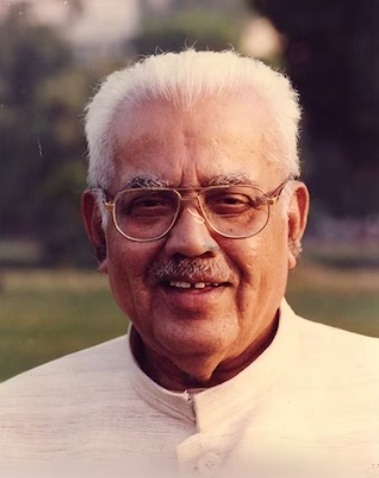

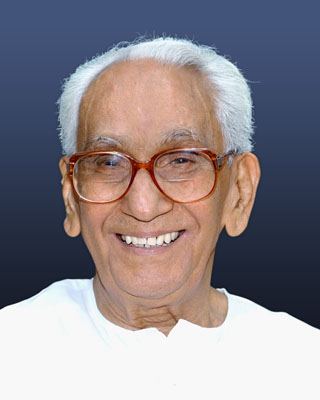
	First party	Second party
Leader	E. K. Nayanar	K. Karunakaran
Party	CPI(M)	INC
Alliance	LDF	UDF
Leader's seat	Malampuzha Assembly constituency	Mala
Last election	35	17
Seats won	28	20
Seat change	▼7	▲3
- Kerala, India; Kerala, one of the states in South India, has an electorate of more than 21 million people.

- Alliance wise Result
Chief Minister before election
President's rule
Elected Chief Minister
K. Karunakaran
INC

The elections to the Seventh Kerala Assembly were held on May 19, 1982.

== Background ==
After the election of 1980, the Left Democratic Front (LDF) formed a government led by E. K. Nayanar. By 20 October 1981, LDF lost their majority in the Assembly when the Congress (A), the Kerala Congress (M) and the Janatha (Gopalan) withdrew support for the government to join the UDF. E.K.Nayanar recommended to the Governor to dissolve the assembly and impose President's rule on 21 October 1981 which led to a mid-term election in 1982.

== Use of electronic voting machines ==
The election of 1982 has historic significance, as it is the first time Electronic Voting Machines (EVM) were used in the country. EVM was used in 50 booths of the Paravoor constituency of Ernakulam district. But it was later challenged in the High Court of Kerala, but the plea was dismissed. The case was moved to the Supreme Court, which ordered re-polling as those 50 booths had no provision in the electoral law for use of voting machines.

== Results ==
=== Party results ===
Party Wise Results
Party	Seats	Total votes	Alliance
Indian National Congress-Indira (Cong-I or INCI)	20	1137374	UDF
Congress (A) (INC(A))	15	920743	UDF
Indian Union Muslim League (IUML)	14	590255	UDF
Kerala Congress- Mani (KCM)	6	559930	UDF
Kerala Congress- Joseph (KCJ)	8	435200	UDF
Janata-Gopalan (JANG)	4	262595	UDF
National Democratic Party (NDP)	4	255580	UDF
Socialist Republican Party (SRP)	2	205250	UDF
Revolutionary Socialist Party-Sreekantan Nair (RSP-S)	1	114721	UDF
Praja Socialist Party (PSP)	1	29011	UDF
Democratic Labour Party (DLP)	1	35821	UDF
Independents (UDF)	1	71025	UDF
Communist Party of India-Marxist (CPI-M)	28	1964924	LDF
Communist Party of India (CPI)	13	838191	LDF
Indian Congress (Socialist) (IC(S))	7	551132	LDF
Revolutionary Socialist Party (RSP)	4	263869	LDF
All Indian Muslim League (AIML)	4	310626	LDF
Janata (JAN)	4	386810	LDF
Democratic Socialist Party (DSP)	1	37705	LDF
Independents (LDF)	2	149928	LDF
Total	140		

=== Constituency results ===
#	AC Name	Type	Winning Candidate	Party	Votes	Runner up	Party	Votes	Margin
1	Manjeswar	GEN	A . Subba Rao	CPI	19554		INC	19391	163
2	Kasaragod	GEN	C. T. Ahammad Ali	IUML	25676		BJP	17657	8,019
3	Udma	GEN	M. Kunhiraman Nambiar	IND	32946		IUML	26327	6,619
4	Hosdrug	SC	K . T. Kumaran	CPI	41728		INC	32144	9,584
5	Trikkarpur	GEN	O . Bharathan	CPI(M)	48197		KC	35995	12,202
6	Irikkur	GEN	K .C. Joseph	IND	39261		JNP	30037	9,224
7	Payyannur	GEN	M. V. Raghavan	CPI(M)	44271		INC	28311	15,960
8	Taliparamba	GEN	C. P. Moossankutty	CPI(M)	46313		IND	35774	10,539
9	Azhicode	GEN	P. Devootty	CPI(M)	36845		JNP	26389	10,456
10	Cannanore	GEN	P. Bhaskaran	IND	34871		IND	32130	2,741
11	Edakkad	GEN	A . K . Sasheendran	ICS	38837		IND	31294	7,543
12	Tellicherry	GEN	Kodiyeri Balakrishnan	CPI(M)	40766		IND	23666	17,100
13	Peringalam	GEN	N. A . Mammoo Haji	AIML	38825		INC	19973	18,852
14	Kuthuparamba	GEN	P . V. Kunhikannan	CPI(M)	42111		KC	26648	15,463
15	Peravoor	GEN	K. P. Noorudin	IND	36903		ICS	36777	126
16	North Wynad	ST	K . Raghavan Master	INC	32225		CPI	25306	6,919
17	Badagara	GEN	K . Chandrasekharan	JNP	42475		IND	30298	12,177
18	Nadapuram	GEN	K . T. Kanaran	CPI	39927		INC	37660	2,267
19	Meppayur	GEN	A . V. Abdurahiman	AIML	42022		IUML	34835	7,187
20	Quilandy	GEN	Manimangalath Kutaly	INC	35293		ICS	33673	1,620
21	Perambra	GEN	A . K . Padmanabhan Master	CPI(M)	41308		KC	34585	6,723
22	Balusseri	GEN	A . C . Shanmukhadas	ICS	34055		IND	27370	6,685
23	Koduvally	GEN	P. V. Muhammad	IUML	35238		JNP	31498	3,740
24	Calicut- I	GEN	N. Chandrasekhara Kurup	CPI(M)	34830		IND	32757	2,073
25	Calicut- Ii	GEN	P. M. Abubacker	AIML	35109		IND	29155	5,954
26	Beypore	GEN	K. Moosakutty	CPI(M)	37592		INC	29015	8,577
27	Kunnamangalam	SC	K. P. Raman	AIML	28901		IND	27266	1,635
28	Thiruvambadi	GEN	P. Cyriac John	IND	30950		IND	27630	3,320
29	Kalpetta	GEN	M. Kamalam	IND	32794		JNP	21919	10,875
30	Sultan's Bathery	GEN	K. K. Ramchandran	INC	31858		CPI(M)	28623	3,235
31	Wandoor	SC	Pandalam Sudhakaram	INC	28637		ICS	22780	5,857
32	Nilambur	GEN	T. K. Hamza	IND	35539		IND	33973	1,566
33	Manjeri	GEN	C. M. Mohammed Koya	IUML	38681		AIML	19031	19,650
34	Malappuram	GEN	P. K. Kunnalikutty	IUML	35464		AIML	13500	21,964
35	Kondotty	GEN	P. Seethi Haji	IUML	37671		AIML	20885	16,786
36	Tirurangadi	GEN	K. Avukader Kutty Naha	IUML	34586		CPI	20527	14,059
37	Tanur	GEN	E. Ahamed	IUML	34632		IND	11168	23,464
38	Tirur	GEN	U. A. Beeran	IUML	36315		AIML	30571	5,744
39	Ponnani	GEN	M. P. Gangadharan	INC	33187		AIML	33094	93
40	Kuttippuram	GEN	Korambayil Ahamed Haji	IUML	31521		AIML	13263	18,258
41	Mankada	GEN	K. P. A. Majeed	IUML	33208		AIML	28845	4,363
42	Perinthalmanna	GEN	Nalakath Sooppy	IUML	34873		IND	31959	2,914
43	Thrithala	SC	K. K. Balakrishnan	INC	31806		CPI(M)	31399	407
44	Pattambi	GEN	K. E. Ismayil	CPI	32013		INC	29870	2,143
45	Ottapalam	GEN	V. C. Kabeer	IND	27689		IND	23994	3,695
46	Sreekrishnapuram	GEN	E. Padmanabhan	CPI(M)	39727		INC	29150	10,577
47	Mannarkkad	GEN	P. Kumaran	CPI	38151		IUML	27665	10,486
48	Malampuzha	GEN	E. K. Nayanar	CPI(M)	37366		KC	20770	16,596
49	Palghat	GEN	C. M. Sundaram	IND	29011		IND	25841	3,170
50	Chittur	GEN	K. Krishnankutty	JNP	37527		INC	31884	5,643
51	Kollengode	GEN	C. Vasudeva Menon	CPI(M)	39245		IND	34360	4,885
52	Coyalmannam	SC	T. K. Arumughan	CPI(M)	41312		INC	27818	13,494
53	Alathur	GEN	C. T. Krishnan	CPI(M)	39982		IND	28668	11,314
54	Chelakara	SC	C. K. Chakrapani	CPI(M)	33030		INC	30907	2,123
55	Wadakkancherry	GEN	K. S. Narayanan Namboodiri	INC	33645		JNP	32007	1,638
56	Kunnamkulam	GEN	K. P. Aravindakshan	CPI(M)	33882		IND	32642	1,240
57	Cherpu	GEN	R. P. Prabhakaran	CPI	33561		INC	29891	3,670
58	Trichur	GEN	Therambil Ramakrishnan	NDP	32410		CPI(M)	30569	1,841
59	Ollur	GEN	Raghavan Pozhakadavil	INC	31691		ICS	28172	3,519
60	Kodakara	GEN	C. G. Janardhanan	ICS	32291		KC	32291	2,750
61	Chalakudi	GEN	K. J. George	JNP	33492		KC	28789	4,703
62	Mala	GEN	K. Karunakaran	INC	35138		CPI	31728	3,410
63	Irinjalakuda	GEN	Lonappan Nambadan	IND	36164		IND	29398	6,766
64	Manalur	GEN	V. M. Sudheeran	IND	31889		CPI(M)	29351	2,538
65	Guruvayoor	GEN	P. K. K. Bava	IUML	31106		IND	20743	10,363
66	Nattika	GEN	Sidharthan Kattungal	IND	28704		CPI	28223	481
67	Kodungallur	GEN	V. K. Raja	CPI	36404		IND	32970	3,434
68	Ankamali	GEN	M. V. Mani	KC	40056		CPI(M)	37679	2,377
69	Vadakkekara	GEN	T. K. Abdu	CPI(M)	33108		IND	31024	2,084
70	Parur	GEN	Sivan Pillai	CPI	30450		IND	30327	123
71	Narakal	SC	P. K. Velayudhan	IND	36604		CPI(M)	32621	3,983
72	Ernakulam	GEN	A. L. Jacob	INC	38051		ICS	30869	7,182
73	Mattancherry	GEN	K. M. Hamsa	IUML	25589		AIML	24031	1,558
74	Palluruthy	GEN	T. P. Peethambaran Master	ICS	37369		KC	37353	16
75	Thrippunithura	GEN	K. G. R. Kartha	IND	39151		CPI(M)	38390	761
76	Alwaye	GEN	K. Mohammedali	IND	40336		CPI(M)	36969	3,367
77	Perumbavoor	GEN	P. P. Thankachan	INC	40131		CPI(M)	33879	6,252
78	Kunnathunad	GEN	T. H. Mustaffa	INC	39155		CPI(M)	33700	5,455
79	Piravom	GEN	Benny Behanan	IND	35451		JNP	33655	1,796
80	Muvattupuzha	GEN	Joseph Varkey	KC	36389		IND	33332	3,057
81	Kothamangalam	GEN	T. M. Jacob	KC	39529		CPI(M)	35467	4,062
82	Thodupuzha	GEN	P. J. Joseph	KC	41020		RSP	25282	15,738
83	Devicolam	SC	G. Varadan	CPI(M)	31365		KC	31219	146
84	Idukki	GEN	Jose Kuttiyani	INC	31472		ICS	27104	4,368
85	Udumbanchola	GEN	M. Jinadevan	CPI(M)	34964		KC	33771	1,193
86	Peermade	GEN	K.K. Thomas	IND	35065		CPI	26036	9,029
87	Kanjirappally	GEN	Thomas Killampally	KC	35840		CPI(M)	27403	8,437
88	Vazhoor	GEN	Kanam Rajendran	CPI	28890		KC	26647	2,243
89	Changanacherry	GEN	C. F. Thomas	KC	37589		IND	27527	10,062
90	Kottayam	GEN	N. Srinivasan	IND	38886		CPI(M)	33548	5,338
91	Ettumanoor	GEN	E. J. Lukose	KC	37444		CPI(M)	31201	6,243
92	Puthuppally	GEN	Oommen Chandy	IND	42066		ICS	26083	15,983
93	Poonjar	GEN	P. C. George	KC	33844		JNP	23814	10,030
94	Palai	GEN	K. M. Mani	KC	39323		IND	26713	12,610
95	Kaduthuruthy	GEN	P. C. Thomas	IND	35711		KC	29761	5,950
96	Vaikom	SC	M. K. Kesavan	CPI	36582		KC	35951	631
97	Aroor	GEN	K. R. Gouri	CPI(M)	41694		KC	35753	5,941
98	Sherthalai	GEN	Vayalar Ravi	IND	36940		CPI	35067	1,873
99	Mararikulam	GEN	A. V. Thamarakshan	RSP	44567		IND	41168	3,399
100	Alleppey	GEN	K. P. Ramachandran Naird	NDP	35014		CPI	33424	1,590
101	Ambalapuzha	GEN	V. Dinakaran	IND	35821		CPI(M)	33937	1,884
102	Kuttanad	GEN	K. C. Joseph	KC	37172		CPI(M)	34184	2,988
103	Haripad	GEN	Ramesh Chennithala	INC	42651		CPI(M)	38074	4,577
104	Kayamkulam	GEN	Thachady Prabhakaran	IND	33996		ICS	33830	166
105	Thiruvalla	GEN	P. C. Thomas	IND	29565		JNP	24197	5,368
106	Kallooppara	GEN	T. S. John	KC	30025		IND	24123	5,902
107	Aranmula	GEN	K. K. Sreenivasan	INC	27864		ICS	22573	5,291
108	Chengannur	GEN	S. Ramachandran Pillai	IND	31156		CPI(M)	27865	3,291
109	Mavelikara	GEN	S. Govinda Kurup	CPI(M)	34743		NDP	33576	1,167
110	Pandalam	SC	V. Kesavan	CPI(M)	38465		IND	36501	1,964
111	Ranni	GEN	Sunny Panavelil	ICS	34490		IND	25245	9,245
112	Pathanamthitta	GEN	K. K. Nair	IND	36676		IND	27217	9,459
113	Konni	GEN	V. S Chandrasekharan Pillai	CPI(M)	32744		INC	31430	1,314
114	Pathanapuram	GEN	A. George	KC	37088		CPI	33160	3,928
115	Punaloor	GEN	Sam Oommen	KC	36091		CPI	34684	1,407
116	Chadayamangalam	GEN	K. R. Chandramohan	CPI	33060		IND	25229	7,831
117	Kottarakara	GEN	R. Balakrishna Pillai	KC	37515		CPI	29371	8,144
118	Neduvathur	SC	C. K. Thankappan	CPI(M)	34973		KC	30898	4,075
119	Adoor	GEN	Thennala Balakrishna Pillai	INC	30911		CPI(M)	29173	1,738
120	Kunnathur	SC	Kottakuzhi Sukumaran	IND	39992		RSP	36602	3,390
121	Karunagapally	GEN	T. V. Vijayarajan	IND	38047		CPI	34406	3,641
122	Chavara	GEN	Baby John	RSP	35907		INC	35286	621
123	Kundara	GEN	Thoppil Ravi	IND	35130		CPI(M)	30931	4,199
124	Quilon	GEN	Kadavoor Sivadasan	IND	35387		RSP	28310	7,077
125	Eravipuram	GEN	R. S. Unni	RSP	37862		IUML	37073	789
126	Chathanoor	GEN	C. V. Padmarajan	INC	37811		CPI	32009	5,802
127	Varkala	GEN	Varkala Radhakrishnan	CPI(M)	27315		IND	25511	1,804
128	Attingal	GEN	Vakkom Purushothaman	IND	31791		ICS	24432	7,359
129	Kilimanoor	SC	Bhargavi Thankappan	CPI	33258		IND	27113	6,145
130	Vamanapuram	GEN	Koliyakodu N. Krishnan Nair	CPI(M)	36303		IND	34349	1,954
131	Ariyanad	GEN	K. Pankajakshan	RSP	30966		IND	28555	2,411
132	Nedumangad	GEN	K. V. Surendranath	CPI	37350		IND	34009	3,341
133	Kazhakuttam	GEN	M. N. Hassan	IND	35028		CPI(M)	33835	1,193
134	Trivandrum North	GEN	G. Karthikeyan	INC	38260		CPI(M)	29414	8,846
135	Trivandrum West	GEN	P. A. Mohammed Kannu	IUML	29795		RSP	24373	5,422
136	Trivandrum East	GEN	K. Sankaranarayana Pillai	ICS	31517		NDP	30865	652
137	Nemom	GEN	K. Karunakaran	INC	36007		CPI(M)	32659	3,348
138	Kovalam	GEN	N. Sakthan Nadar	IND	37705		INC	34348	3,357
139	Neyyattinkara	GEN	S. R. Thankaraj	JNP	43159		NDP	28179	14,980
140	Parassala	GEN	N. Sundaran Nadar	INC	34503		CPI(M)	31782	2,721
