= List of people from Kollam =

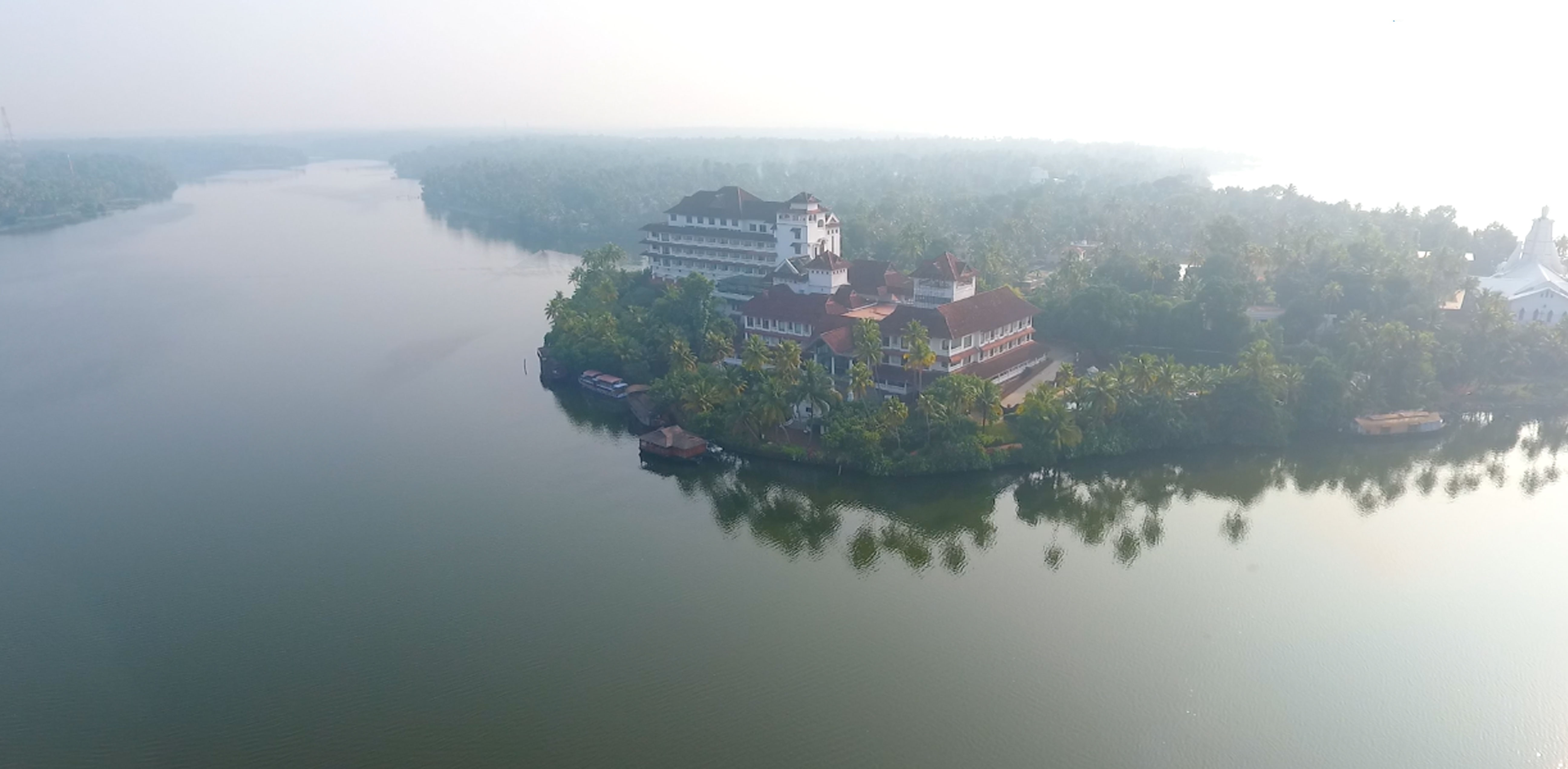
Aerial view of Kollam city

The following is a list of notable people from Kollam, Kerala, India.

== Film and media ==
=== Actors and Actresses ===
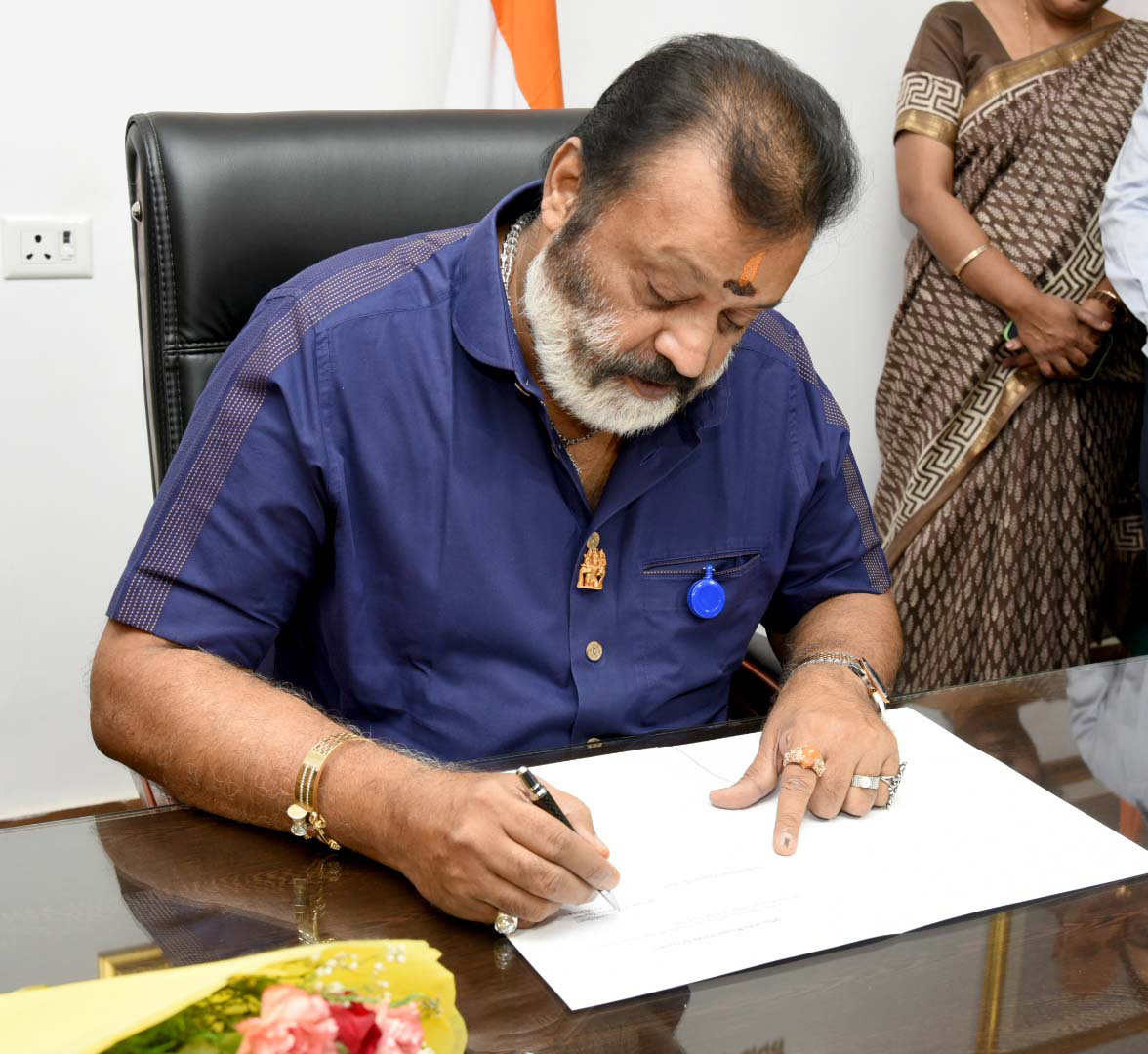
Shri Suresh Gopi, a famous Indian actor and politician with ancestral roots in Kollam, assumed charge as the Minister of State for Tourism in India on 11 June 2024

- Jayan, Indian actor
- Suresh Gopi, Indian actor and politician
- Mohanlal, famous Indian actor
- Urvashi (actress), Indian actress
- Jayabharathi, Indian actress
- Kottarakkara Sreedharan Nair, Indian Actor
- Kollam G. K. Pillai, Indian actor
- Murali (Malayalam actor), Indian actor
- Balachandra Menon, Indian actor and director
- Sai Kumar (Malayalam actor), Indian actor
- Kalaranjini, Indian actress
- Anusree, Indian actress
- Mallika Sukumaran, Malayalam actress
- Narendra Prasad, Malayalam actor
- Aranmula Ponnamma, Malayalam actress
- K. B. Ganesh Kumar, Indian actor and minister
- Shobha Mohan, Indian actress
- Jalaja, Indian actress
- Ambili Devi, Malayalam film actress
- Jayakumar Parameswaran Pillai, Indian television actor
- P. Balachandran, Indian actor
- Anu Mohan, Indian actor
- Vinu Mohan, Indian actor
- Vijay Babu, Indian actor and producer
- Uma Nair, television actress
- Baby Ameya, Indian child actress
- Kundara Johnny, Indian actor
- Aima Rosmy Sebastian, Indian actress
- Shiju A R, Indian actor
- Noorin Shereef, Indian actress
- Vineeth Mohan, Indian actor
- Mukesh, Indian actor and politician
- Jameela Malik, Indian actress
- K. P. A. C. Sunny, Indian actor
- Divyadarshan, Indian actor
- Vinitha Koshy, Indian actress
- O. Madhavan, theatre personality
- Geetha Salam, Indian actor
- Kollam thulasi, Indian actor

=== Directors, Producers and Script-writers ===
- Rahul Riji Nair, Indian film director
- East Coast Vijayan, Indian film producer and lyricist
- K. Ravindranathan Nair, Indian film producer
- G. R. Indugopan, Indian screenwriter
- Amal Neerad, Indian film director
- K. P. Nambiathiri, Indian cinematographer
- R. Sarath, Indian film director and screenwriter
- Anwar Rasheed, Indian film director and producer
- Sajan K. Mathew, Indian film director
- Shaji N Karun, Malayalam movie director
- James Albert, screenwriter and director
- Girish Gangadharan, Indian cinematographer
- Ansar Shah, Indian cinematographer
- M. A. Nishad, Indian film director

=== Sound Engineers ===
- Resul Pookutty, Oscar Award winner, sound engineer
- Tony Babu, Indian film sound designer

== Literature and writing ==
- Azhakathu Padmanabha Kurup, Indian scholar
- P. Madhavan Pillai, writer and translator
- Vennikkulam Gopala Kurup, Indian Politician
- O. N. V. Kurup, Indian writer
- N. P. Nayar, Indian writer
- Sooranad Kunjan Pillai, Indian writer
- S. Guptan Nair, Indian scholar and writer
- Panmana Ramachandran Nair, Malayalam language writer
- Kurissery Gopala Pillai, Indian writer
- Elamkulam Kunjan Pillai, historian and scholar
- Sugathakumari, Indian poet
- K. C. Kesava Pillai, Indian writer
- C. N. Sreekantan Nair, Indian writer
- Lalithambika Antharjanam, Indian writer
- Pamman, Indian writer
- Krishnabhaskar Mangalasserri, Indian writer
- C. V. Kunhiraman, Indian writer
- Thirunalloor Karunakaran, Indian writer
- Vidhu Vincent, Indian writer
- Cheri Viswanath, Indian writer
- Samuel (cartoonist), Indian writer
- P. Bhaskaranunni, Malayalam scholar and literary critic

== Bureaucrats and Politicians ==
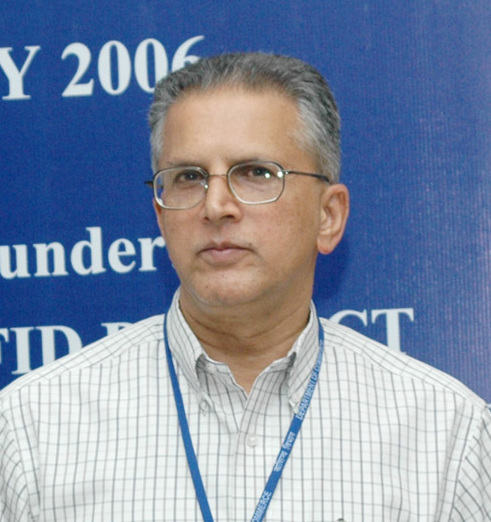
Gopal Krishna Pillai, retired Indian Administrative Service officer and the former Home Secretary in the Government of India

- Gopal Krishna Pillai, Indian administrative officer
- K. Chandrasekhara Pillai, Indian politician
- Thennala Balakrishna Pillai, Indian politician
- R. Balakrishna Pillai, Former minister of kerala
- Kumbalathu Sanku Pillai, politician and freedom fighter
- Eswara Pillai Chandrasekharan Nair, Indian politician and former Minister of Kerala
- K. B. Ganesh Kumar, Indian actor and minister
- K. N. P. Kurup, Indian Politician
- G. Janardhana Kurup, Indian lawyer and politician
- P. R. Madhavan Pillai, Indian politician
- V. P. Ramakrishna Pillai, Indian politician
- N. K. Premachandran, member of Lok Sabha representing Kollam Lok Sabha constituency.
- Rajmohan Unnithan, Indian politician
- P. C. Vishnunadh, Indian politician
- C. R. Mahesh, Indian politician
- E. K. Pillai, Indian politician
- G. S. Jayalal, Indian politician
- P. Aisha Potty, Indian politician and the MLA
- C. Kesavan, Chief minister of erstwhile travancore-cochin(1950–52)
- R. Sankar, former chief minister of kerala
- M. A. Baby, politician
- C. V. Padmarajan, Indian politician and advocate
- P. K. Gurudasan, politician and MLA
- Baby John, politician
- M. Noushad, politician
- A. A. Rahim, politician
- T. M. Varghese, politician and freedom fighter
- J. Chinchu Rani, politician
- Henry Austin (Indian politician), politician

== Business and commerce ==
- B. Ravi Pillai, businessman
- Rajan Pillai, businessman
- K. Ravindranathan Nair, Indian businessman
- Thangal Kunju Musaliar, industrialist & educational visionary
- Sohan Roy, Indian entrepreneur

== Rulers and Nobles ==
- Vira Ravi Ravi Varma, Raja of Venad
- Ettuveetil Pillamar, Landlords and governors of Venad

== Social Service ==
- N. P. Nayar, Administrator of Azad Hind
- Kumbalathu Sanku Pillai, politician and freedom fighter
- Vijayan K. Pillai, professor at the School of Social Work in the University of Texas at Arlington, USA
- Lalithambika Antharjanam, Social reformer

== Stage Artist ==
- Mukundan Pillai, Kathaprasangam Artist
- Madavoor Vasudevan Nair Rama Kurup, Kathakali artist

== Law ==
- Karunakaran Babu, Kerala High Court Judge

== Journalist ==
- Sreekandan Nair, Indian media personality

== Religion and Spiritual ==
- Chattampi Swamikal, Hindu sage
- Matha Amrithananda Mayi, spiritual leader

== Sports ==
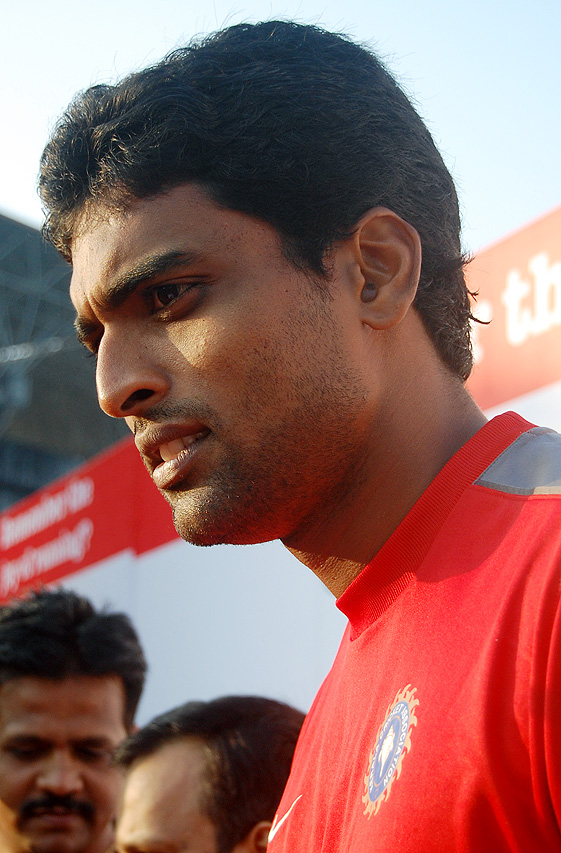
Tinu Yohannan, former Indian cricketer

- Tinu Yohannan, international cricket
- Suresh Babu, Indian long jumper
- Olympian T. C. Yohannan, athlete
- Akshay Kodoth, Indian cricketer
