= Manchalloor =

- Village
- Location within Kerala
- Coordinates: 9.0927°N 76.8612°E
- Country: India
- State: Kerala
- District: Kollam
- Taluk: Pathanapuram

Languages
  - Official: Malayalam, Tamil
- Time zone: UTC+5:30 (IST)
- PIN: 689695
- Telephone code: 0475
- Vehicle registration: KL-02, KL-25, KL-77
- Nearest city: Pathanamthitta Adoor Kottarakara Punalur
- Lok Sabha constituency: Mavelikara
- Assembly constituency: Pathanapuram
- Literacy: 93.63%

Manchalloor is a village situated near Pathanapuram in Kollam District, Kerala state, India. Manchalloor is a part of Pathanapuram Grama panchayat, Block panchayat and Kollam district Panchayat.

== Politics ==
Manchallor is a part of Pathanapuram assembly constituency in Mavelikkara (Lok Sabha constituency). Shri. K. B. Ganesh Kumar is the current MLA of Pathanpuram. Shri.Kodikkunnil Suresh is the current member of parliament of Mavelikkara.

== Geography ==
Manchalloor is a small village on the border of Pathanapuram and Thalavoor panchayats. It is divided by the Kallada River. Manchalloor is a junction in the Pathanapuram-Kottarakkara road. It connects places Kundayam, Nedumparampu, etc. Pidavoor bridge is a main landmark of Manchalloor.

== Demographics ==
Malayalam is the native language of Manchalloor.

== Schools ==
The schools in Manchalloor includes

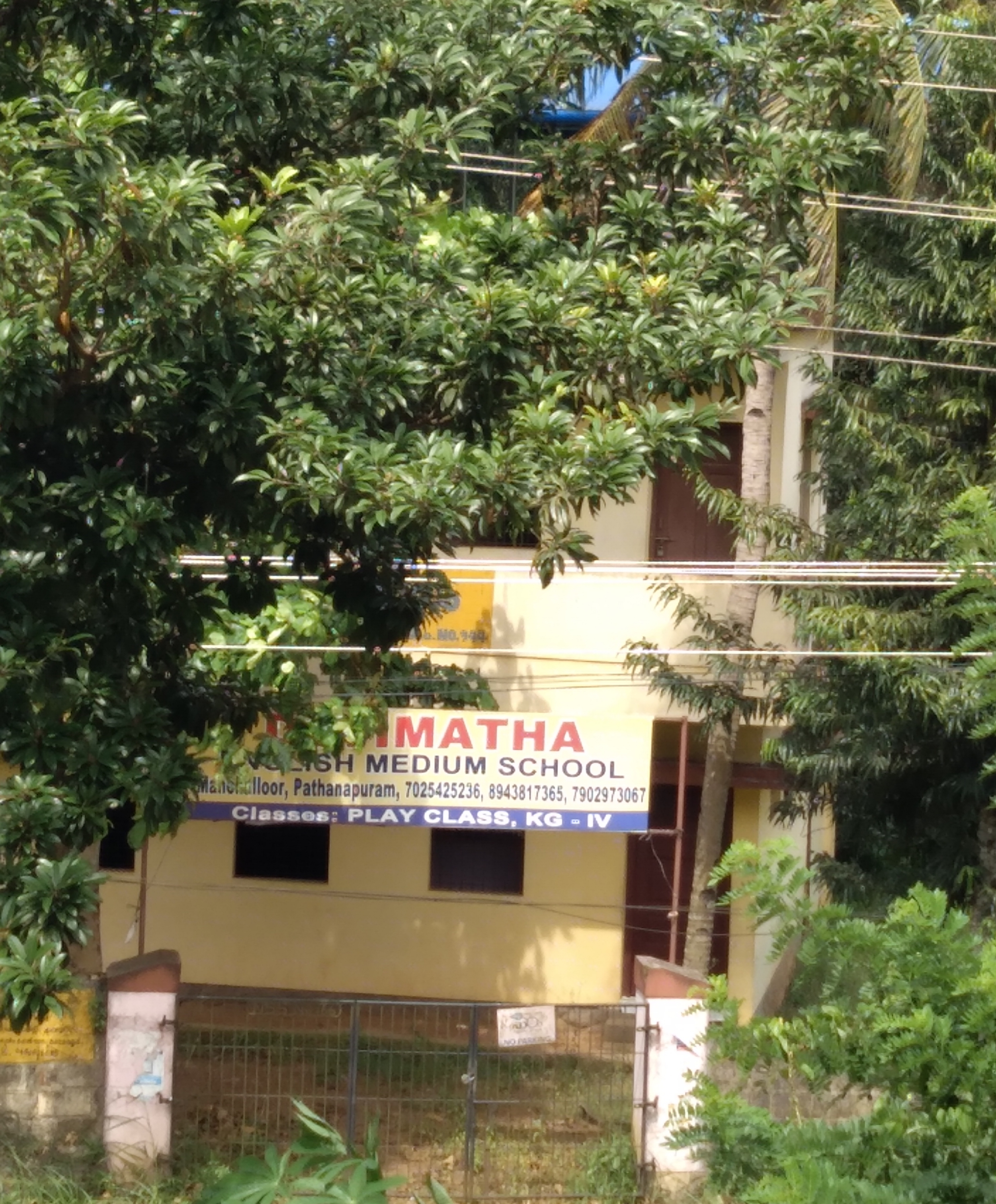
Devi Matha English Medium School, Pathanapuram

- Devi Matha English Medium School

== Gallery ==
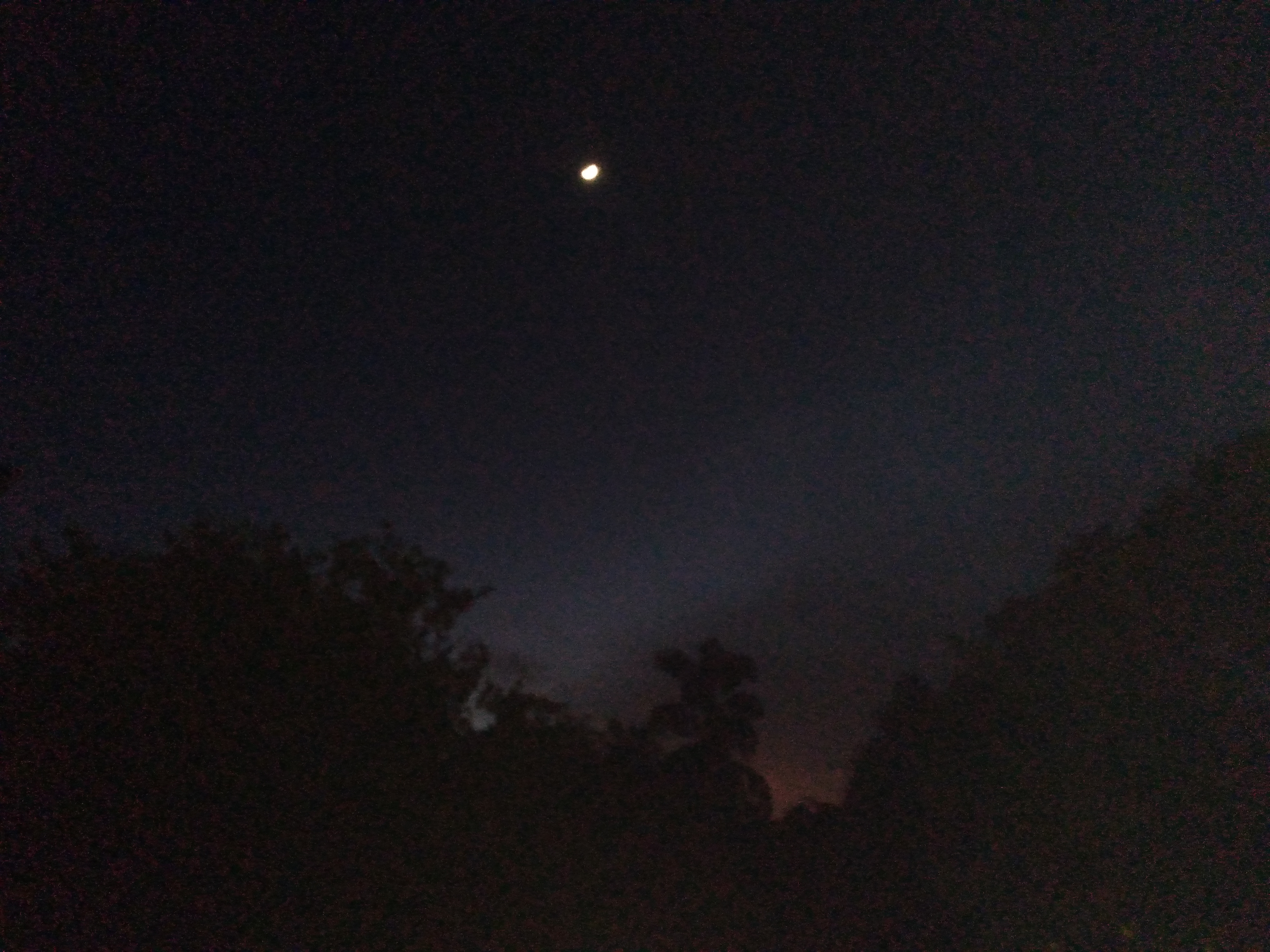
Night sky in Manchalloor

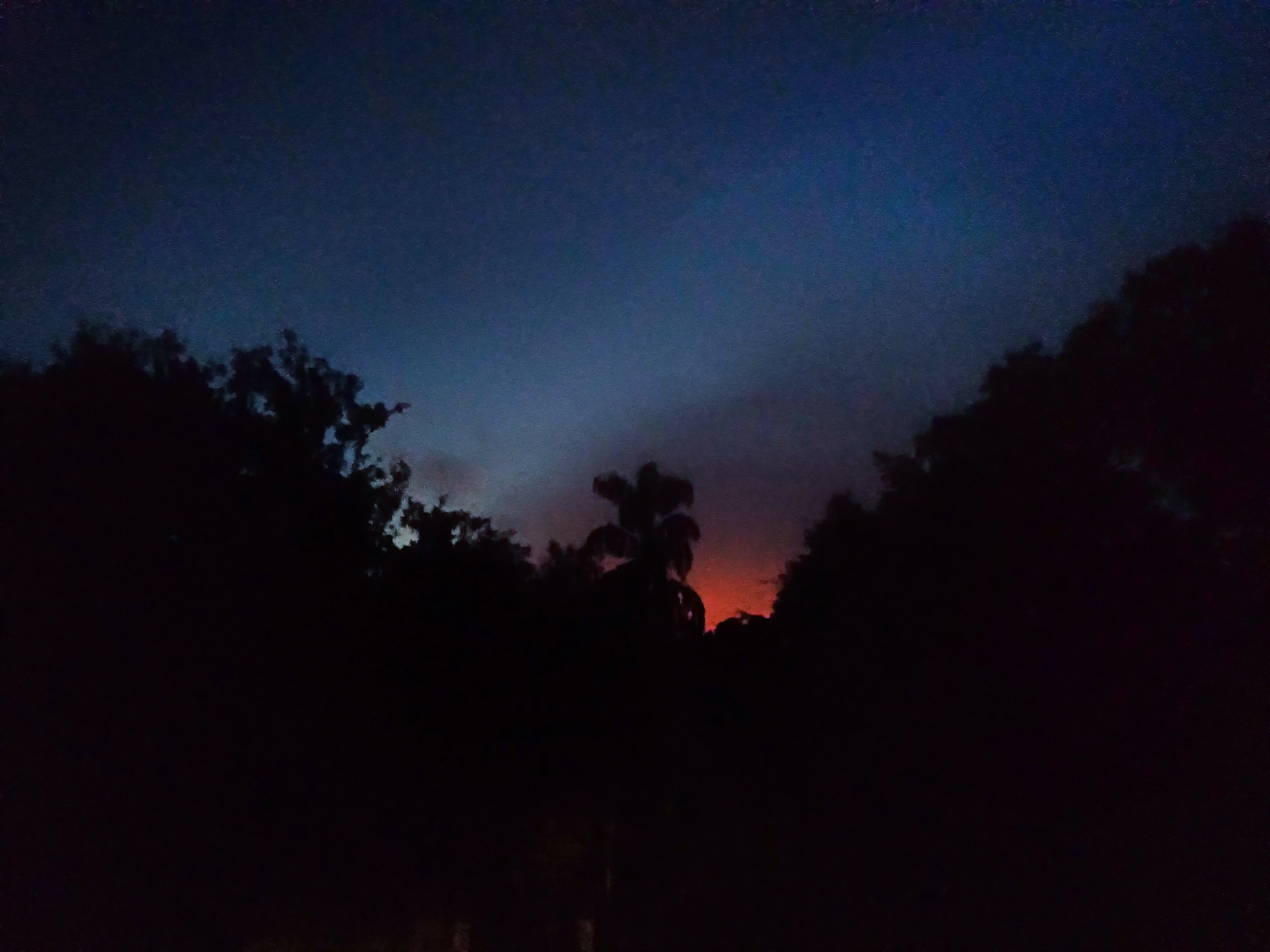
Twilight in Manchalloor
