= Paippad Puthenkavu Bhagavathi Temple =

- Puthenkavu Bhagavathy Temple, Paipad, Kottayam, Kerala

Religion
- Affiliation: Hinduism
- District: Kottayam
- Deity: Puthenkavil Bhagavathiyamma
- Festivals: Kalamezuthu and Pattu

Location
- Location: Paippad
- State: Kerala
- Country: India
- Interactive map of Paippad Puthenkavu Bhagavathi Temple
- Coordinates: 9°25′18.3″N 76°34′02.4″E

Specifications
- Temple: One
- Elevation: 25.93 m (85 ft)

Website
- paippadputhenkavu.org

Paippad Puthenkavu Bhagavathi Temple is an ancient Bhagavathi shrine located at Paippad, Changanacherry, in Kottayam, Kerala, India. It is situated at Paippad, on Changanacherry – Kaviyoor road and 5 km away from Changanacherry. Annual festival is celebrated on Bharani day of Meenam Month (Malayalam Calendar). The procession named Kalamezuthu & Pattu is one of the most important among the celebrations of the nearby temples. Makarabharani Pongala is a significant offering to the goddess of this temple.

The Paippad Puthenkavu Bhagavathy Temple is governed by an elected group of Devaswom members from the NSS Karayogam No:286 Paippad East and NSS Karayogam No: 1794 Paippad West. This Devaswom committee is the authorized body which is responsible for looking the day to affairs of the temple.

== Location ==
This temple is located with the geographic coordinates of 9°25′18.3″N 76°34′02.4″E at Paippad.
