= C. F. Thomas =

Indian politician (1939–2020)

Member of the Kerala Legislative Assembly
- In office 1980 – 27 September 2020
- Preceded by: Joseph Chacko
- Succeeded by: Job Michael
- Constituency: Changanassery

Minister for Registration, Rural Development, Khadi and Village Industries, Government of Kerala
- In office 17 May 2001 – 12 May 2006
- Governor: Sukhdev Singh Kang; Sikander Bakht; T. N. Chaturvedi (Additional Charge); R. L. Bhatia
- Chief Minister: A. K. Antony; Oommen Chandy

Personal details
- Born: Chennikkara Francis Thomas; 30 July 1939 Changanassery, Kingdom of Travancore, British India (present day Kottayam, Kerala, India)
- Died: 27 September 2020 (aged 81) Thiruvalla, Pathanamthitta, Kerala, India
- Party: Kerala Congress
- Spouse: Kunjamma
- Children: 1 Son, 2 Daughters
- Parent(s): Francis and Annamma

Chennikkara Francis Thomas (30 July 1939 – 27 September 2020) was an Indian politician from Changanassery and member of the Kerala Legislative Assembly. He was Minister for Rural Development in the third A. K. Antony ministry and the subsequent first Oommen Chandy ministry. He was also the Chairman of the Kerala Congress and later became its Deputy Chairman.

Before entering politics, he was a teacher at St. Berchmans Higher Secondary School in Changanassery from 1962 to 1980.

== Political career ==
Thomas entered politics in 1956 as an activist of the Kerala Students Union, the student wing of the Indian National Congress. He joined the Kerala Congress in 1964 and was a founder member of the party. He was elected to the Kerala Legislative Assembly for 9 consecutive terms starting from 1980, representing Changanassery constituency.

Thomas was a minister in the third A. K. Antony ministry and the subsequent first Oommen Chandy ministry, holding the portfolios of Registration, Rural Development, Khadi and Village Industries. He was the State Level General Secretary of Kerala Catholic Students League. He was respected for his humility and simple lifestyle.

Starting political activities while a student, he joined Indian National Congress and then became Vice-President of Changanassery Town (West). He joined Kerala Congress on its formation and served as Secretary and President of Changanassery constituency; District Secretary, Kottayam; Member, State Executive Committee. He worked as General Secretary and Chairman of the Kerala Congress (M).

Owing to the amalgamation of the three groups of Kerala Congress, he served as its Deputy Chairman. He allied with the P. J. Joseph faction of KC(M) after the party faced a rift following K. M. Mani's death.

Thomas died at Thiruvalla Believers Church Medical College Hospital on 27 September 2020, at age 81, following a long illness.
