= Kundayam =

- Village
- Location within Kerala
- Coordinates: 9.0927°N 76.8612°E
- Country: India
- State: Kerala
- District: Kollam
- Taluk: Pathanapuram

Languages
  - Official: Malayalam, Tamil, English
- Time zone: UTC+5:30 (IST)
- PIN: 689695
- Telephone code: 0475
- Vehicle registration: KL-02, KL-25, KL-77
- Nearest city: Pathanamthitta Adoor Kottarakara Punalur
- Lok Sabha constituency: Mavelikara
- Assembly constituency: Pathanapuram
- Literacy: 93.63%

Kundayam is a village situated near Pathanapuram in Kollam District, Kerala state, India. Kundayam is a part of Pathanapuram Block Panchayat and Kollam district Panchayat.

== Politics ==
Kundayam is a part of Pathanapuram assembly constituency in Mavelikkara (Lok Sabha constituency). Shri. K. B. Ganesh Kumar is the current MLA of Pathanpuram. Shri. Kodikkunnil Suresh is the current member of parliament of Mavelikkara.
