= Vinu Job Kuzhimannil =

Indian politician from Kerala

Member of the Kerala Legislative Assembly
- Incumbent
- Assumed office 4 May 2026
- Preceded by: Job Maichil
- Constituency: Changanassery

Personal details
- Party: Kerala Congress
- Education: St. Berchmans College

Vinu Job Kuzhimannil (born c. 1968) is an Indian politician from Kerala and a member of the Kerala Congress. He represents the Changanassery Assembly constituency in the Kerala Legislative Assembly, having been elected in the 2026 Kerala Legislative Assembly election.

== Early life and education ==
Vinu Job Kuzhimannil was born in Nalukodi, Paippad, in the Kottayam district of Kerala. He is the son of Job Kuzhimannil. He completed his schooling locally and graduated with a Bachelor of Commerce (B.Com) from St. Berchmans College (S.B. College), Changanassery, under Mahatma Gandhi University.

== Political career ==
Prior to his election to the state assembly, Vinu Job served as a member of the Kottayam District Panchayat, representing the Thrickodithanam division. He is associated with the Kerala Congress, a constituent of the United Democratic Front (UDF).

In the 2026 Kerala Legislative Assembly election, he contested from the Changanassery Assembly constituency and defeated the incumbent MLA, Adv. Job Maichil of Kerala Congress (M), by a margin of 8,368 votes.

His campaign focused on issues such as rubber farmers' welfare, youth employment, and infrastructure development in the Pamba basin region.

== Personal life ==
Vinu Job Kuzhimannil is a resident of Payippad in Kottayam district. He is married, and his spouse is a Higher Secondary School teacher.

== Electoral performance ==
=== 2026 Kerala Legislative Assembly election ===
Changanassery Assembly constituency (99)
Party	Candidate	Votes	%	Margin
Kerala Congress	Vinu Job Kuzhimannil	55,991	46.2%	+8,368
Kerala Congress (M)	Adv. Job Maichil	47,623	39.3%	−8,368
Bharatiya Janata Party	B. Radhakrishna Menon	14,803	12.2%	−41,188
Others		2,733	2.3%	—
