= K. Prakash Babu =

Indian politician (born 1955)

Member of the Kerala Legislative Assembly
- In office 1991–2001
- Preceded by: E. Chandrasekharan Nair
- Succeeded by: K. B. Ganesh Kumar
- Constituency: Pathanapuram

Personal details
- Born: 15 May 1955 (age 71)
- Party: Communist Party of India
- Spouse: S. Sobhana Kumari
- Children: 1 son, 1 daughter
- Parent: G. Krishna Pillai (father)
- Education: BA, BEd, LLB
- Occupation: Teacher, politician

Krishna Pillai Prakash Babu (born 14 May 1955) is an Indian communist politician. He represented Pathanapuram constituency in the Kerala Legislative Assembly from 1991 to 2001. In May 2001, he lost the Kerala Assembly election to Ganesh Kumar of Kerala Congress (B). Prakash Babu was headmaster of Manjakkala U.P. school. In 2012, he was elected the Assistant Secretary of Communist Party of India Kerala State Council.

== Positions held ==
- Chairman, Committee on Subordinate Legislation (1996–98) & (1998-01)
- Member, C.P.I. State Council
- Member CPI District Council
- Member Kerala University Senate
- President, All India Kisan Sabha, Kerala State Council
- AIYF Kollam District
- Headmaster, Manjakkala U.P.S.
