= Pathanapuram Assembly constituency =

Constituency of the Kerala legislative assembly, India

Pathanapuram
- Constituency No. 120 for the Kerala Legislative Assembly
- Pathanapuram within Kollam district

Constituency details
- Country: India
- Region: South India
- State: Kerala
- District: Kollam
- Lok Sabha constituency: Mavelikara
- Established: 1957
- Total electors: 1,85,116 (2021)
- Reservation: None

Member of Legislative Assembly
- 16th Kerala Legislative Assembly
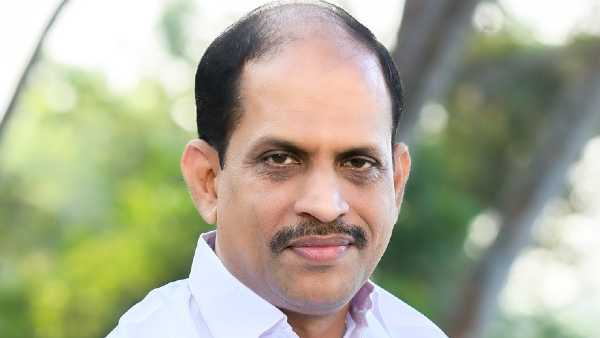
- Incumbent Jyothikumar Chamakkala
- Party: Indian National Congress
- Alliance: UDF
- Elected year: 2026

Pathanapuram Assembly constituency is one of the 140 state legislative assembly constituencies in Kerala, India. It is one of the seven assembly segments that constitute the Mavelikara Lok Sabha constituency. Since 2001, it has been represented by K. B. Ganesh Kumar of the Kerala Congress (B). In the 2026 Kerala Legislative Assembly election, he was defeated by Jyothikumar Chamakkala of the Indian National Congress.

== Local self-governed segments ==
Pathanapuram Assembly constituency is composed of the following local self-governed segments:

Sl no.	Name	Status (Grama panchayat/Municipality)	Taluk
1	Pathanapuram	Grama panchayat	Pathanapuram
2	Pattazhy	Grama panchayat	Pathanapuram
3	Pattazhy Vadakkekara	Grama panchayat	Pathanapuram
4	Piravanthoor	Grama panchayat	Pathanapuram
5	Thalavoor	Grama panchayat	Pathanapuram
6	Vilakkudy	Grama panchayat	Pathanapuram
7	Melila	Grama panchayat	Kottarakkara
8	Vettikkavala	Grama panchayat	Kottarakkara

== Members of the Legislative Assembly ==
The following list contains all the members of the Kerala Legislative Assembly who have represented the Pathanapuram Assembly constituency during various legislative assemblies.

Key

CPI INC KEC KC(B)

Election	Member	Party
1957	N. Rajagopalan Nair	Communist Party of India
1960	R. Balakrishna Pillai	Indian National Congress
1967	P. K. Raghavan	Communist Party of India
1970	P. K. Raghavan	Communist Party of India
1977	E. K. Pillai	Communist Party of India
1980	E. K. Pillai	Communist Party of India
1982	A. George	Kerala Congress
1987	E. Chandrasekharan Nair	Communist Party of India
1991	K. Prakash Babu	Communist Party of India
1996	K. Prakash Babu	Communist Party of India
2001	K. B. Ganesh Kumar	Kerala Congress (B)
2006	K. B. Ganesh Kumar	Kerala Congress (B)
2011	K. B. Ganesh Kumar	Kerala Congress (B)
2016	K. B. Ganesh Kumar	Kerala Congress (B)
2021	K. B. Ganesh Kumar	Kerala Congress (B)
2026	Jyothi Kumar Chamakkala	Indian National Congress

== Election results ==
Percentage change (±%) denotes the change in the number of votes from the immediate previous election.

=== 2026 ===
2026 Kerala Legislative Assembly election: Pathanapuram
Party	Candidate	Votes	%	±%
INC	Jyothi Kumar Chamakkala	68,275	49.61	▲10.58
KC(B)	K. B. Ganesh Kumar	59,965	43.57	▼5.52
TTP	S. Anilkumar	7,031	5.11	▼3.94
NOTA	None of the above	613	0.45	▲0.10
Margin of victory		8310	6.03	▼4.44
Turnout		1,37,623		
INC gain from KC(B)		Swing		

=== 2021 ===
There were 1,85,116 registered voters in the Pathanapuram constituency for the 2021 Kerala Assembly election.

2021 Kerala Legislative Assembly election: Pathanapuram
Party	Candidate	Votes	%	±%
KC(B)	K. B. Ganesh Kumar	67,276	49.09	▼3.30
INC	Jyothikumar Chamakkala	52,940	38.63	▲3.53
BJP	V. S. Jithin Dev	12,398	9.05	▲0.81
Marxist Communist Party of India	P. Krishnammal	2,091	1.53	–
SDPI	Adv. Faizy. M. Pasha	1,192	0.87	▼1.84
NOTA	None of the above	474	0.35	▲0.03
Anna DHRM	Baiju Pathanapuram	411	0.30	–
Independent	Aji Kadassery	254	0.19	–
Margin of victory		14,336	10.47	▼6.82
Turnout		1,37,327	74.18	▼0.65
KC(B) hold		Swing	▼3.30	

=== 2016 ===
There were 1,89,837 registered voters in the Pathanapuram constituency for the 2016 Kerala Assembly election.

2016 Kerala Legislative Assembly election: Pathanapuram
Party	Candidate	Votes	%	±%
KC(B)	K. B. Ganesh Kumar	74,429	52.39%	▼3.25
INC	P. V. Jagadish Kumar	49,867	35.10%	–
BJP	Raghu Damodharan	11,700	8.24%	▲6.03
SDPI	Adv. Faizy M. Pasha	3,843	2.71%	–
BSP	Perinadu Gopalakrishnan	846	0.60%	▼0.07
NOTA	None of the above	454	0.32%	–
Independent	Rekhu P.	366	0.26%	–
SS	Sudheer M. G.	254	0.18%	–
Independent	Chandrasekhara Pillai M. G.	194	0.14%	–
Independent	Madhu R.	105	0.07%	–
Margin of victory		24,562	17.29%	▲1.39
Turnout		1,42,058	74.83%	▲0.60
KC(B) hold		Swing	▼3.25	

=== 2011 ===
There were 1,72,946 registered voters in the Pathanapuram constituency for the 2011 Kerala Assembly election.

2011 Kerala Legislative Assembly election: Pathanapuram
Party	Candidate	Votes	%	±%
KC(B)	K. B. Ganesh Kumar	71,421	55.64%	▲2.16
CPI(M)	K. Rajagopal	51,019	39.74%	–
BJP	R. Subhash Pattazhy	2,839	2.21%	▼0.04
Independent	Aneesh Anthony	1,613	1.26%	▲0.44
BSP	Punalur Salim	864	0.67%	▲0.16
Independent	N. Sunilkumar	611	0.48%	–
Margin of victory		20,402	15.90%	▲4.53
Turnout		1,28,367	74.23%	▲2.10
KC(B) hold		Swing	▲2.16	

=== 2006 ===
There were 1,44,025 registered voters in the Pathanapuram constituency for the 2006 Kerala Assembly election.

2006 Kerala Legislative Assembly election: Pathanapuram
Party	Candidate	Votes	%	±%
KC(B)	K. B. Ganesh Kumar	55,554	53.48	▲0.72
CPI	K. R. Chandramohanan	43,740	42.11	▼1.65
BJP	Vilakkudi Chandran	2,334	2.25	▼0.04
Independent	Aneesh Antony	859	0.82	–
Independent	Madappara Muraleedharan	615	0.59	–
BSP	Kuzhicheyil Sunil	526	0.51	–
Independent	S. Krishnankutty	248	0.24	–
Margin of victory		11,814	11.37	▲2.37
Turnout		103,883	72.13	▲1.10
KC(B) hold		Swing	▲0.72	

=== 2001 ===
There were 1,55,397 registered voters in the Pathanapuram constituency for the 2001 Kerala Assembly election.

2001 Kerala Legislative Assembly election: Pathanapuram
Party	Candidate	Votes	%	±%
KC(B)	K. B. Ganesh Kumar	58,224	52.76	▲7.44
CPI	Adv. K. Prakash Babu	48,293	43.76	▼6.13
BJP	A. V. Muraleedharan	2,525	2.29	–
Independent	Thomas Baby	1,319	1.20	–
Margin of victory		9,931	9.00	▲4.43
Turnout		110,383	71.03	▲1.18
KC(B) gain from CPI		Swing	▲7.44	

== See also ==
- Pathanapuram
- Kollam district
- List of constituencies of the Kerala Legislative Assembly
- 2016 Kerala Legislative Assembly election
