= A. M. Kalyanakrishnan Nair =

Indian politician

A. M. Kalyanakrishnan Nair (7 March 1926 – 13 May 2008) was an Indian politician and leader of Communist Party of India. He represented Changanassery constituency in 1st Kerala Legislative Assembly. He became active in politics in 1954 when he was elected as the Municipal Councilor of Changanassery as a law student. He was also the Councilor of Changanassery Municipality, President of Nagara Sevak Samithi (Changanassery), President of Kottayam District Agricultural Workers Council and Teacher (later Headmaster).

He died on 13 May 2008, in a nursing home in Ernakulam.
