= Changanassery Assembly constituency =

Constituency of the Kerala legislative assembly in India

Changanassery
- Constituency No. 99 for the Kerala Legislative Assembly
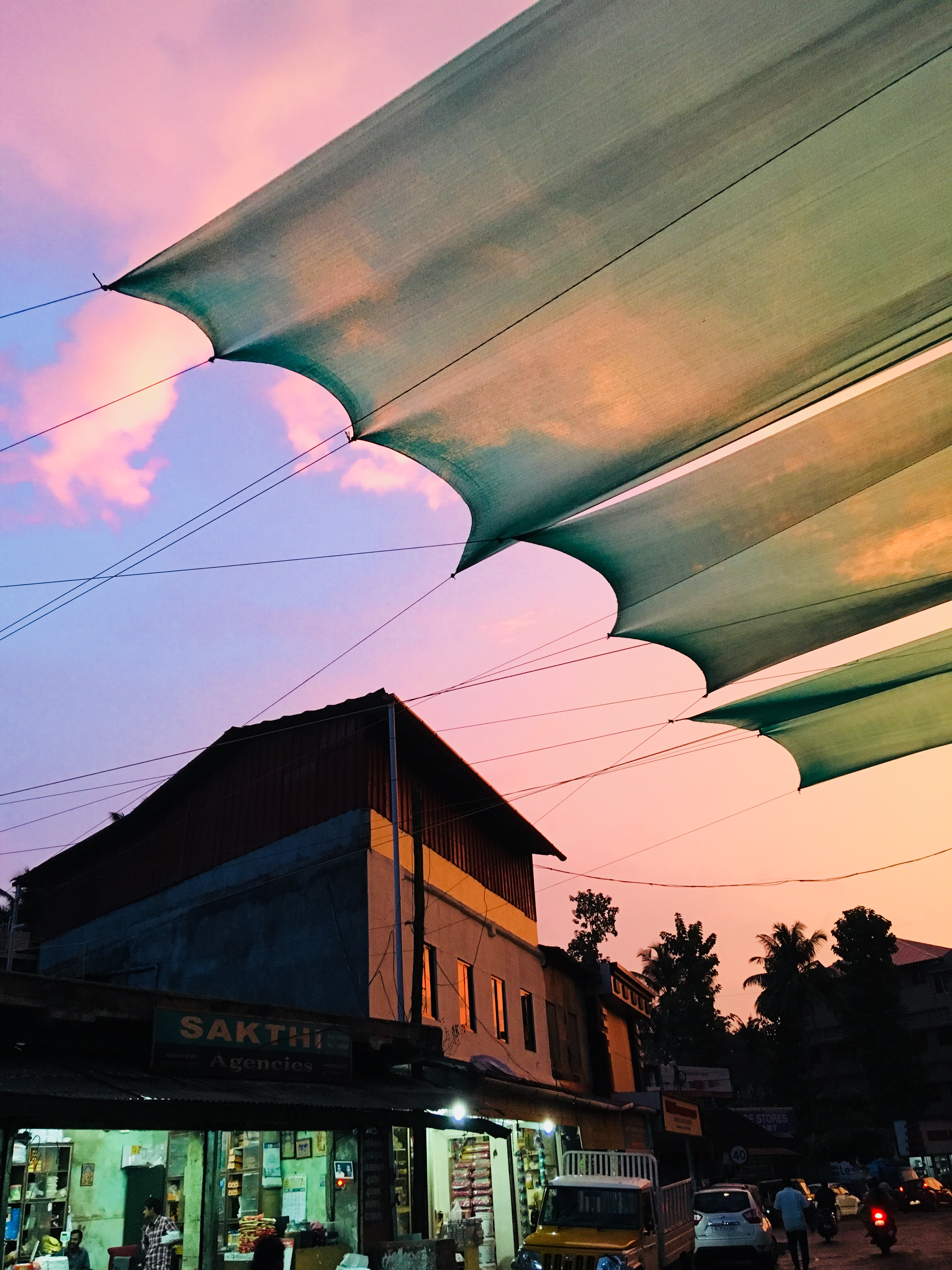
- A street at Changanassery Market.

Constituency details
- Country: India
- Region: South India
- State: Kerala
- District: Kottayam
- Established: 1957
- Total electors: 1,67,180 (2016)
- Reservation: None

Member of Legislative Assembly
- 16th Kerala Legislative Assembly
- Incumbent Vinu Job Kuzhimannil
- Party: Kerala Congress

Changanassery State assembly constituency is one of the 140 state legislative assembly constituencies in Kerala in southern India. It is also one of the seven state legislative assembly constituencies included in Mavelikara Lok Sabha constituency. In the 2026 Kerala Legislative Assembly election, Vinu Job of the Kerala Congress was elected from the constituency.

Changanassery is home to Nair Service Society and Syro Malabar Archeparchy of Changanacherry.

== Local self-governed segments ==
Changanassery Assembly constituency is composed of the following local self-governed segments:

Name	Status (Grama panchayat/Municipality)	Taluk
Changanassery	Municipality	Changanassery
Kurichy	Grama panchayat	Changanassery
Madappally	Grama panchayat	Changanassery
Paippad	Grama panchayat	Changanassery
Thrikkodithanam	Grama panchayat	Changanassery
Vazhappally	Grama panchayat	Changanassery

== Members of Legislative Assembly ==
The following list contains all members of Kerala Legislative Assembly who have represented the constituency:

Year	Name	Political party
1957	A. M. Kalyanakrishnan Nair	Communist Party of India
1960	N. Bhaskaran Nair	Indian National Congress
1967	K. G. Neelakantan Nambudiripad	Communist Party of India
1970	K. J. Chacko	Kerala Congress
1977	K. J. Chacko	Kerala Congress
1980	Chennikkara Francis Thomas	Kerala Congress
1982	Chennikkara Francis Thomas	Kerala Congress
1987	Chennikkara Francis Thomas	Independent politician
1991	Chennikkara Francis Thomas	Kerala Congress (M)
1996	Chennikkara Francis Thomas	Kerala Congress (M)
2001	Chennikkara Francis Thomas	Kerala Congress (M)
2006	Chennikkara Francis Thomas	Kerala Congress (M)
2011	Chennikkara Francis Thomas	Kerala Congress (M)
2016	Chennikkara Francis Thomas	Kerala Congress (M)
2021	Job Maichil	Kerala Congress (M)
2026	Vinu Job Kuzhimannil	Kerala Congress

== Election results ==
Percentage change (±%) denotes the change in the number of votes from the immediately previous election.

=== 2026 ===
2026 Kerala Legislative Assembly election: Changanassery
Party	Candidate	Votes	%	±%
KEC	Vinu Job	55,991	46.22	
KC(M)	Job Maichil	47,623	39.31	
BJP	B. Radhakrishna Menon	14,803	12.22	
NOTA	None of the above	532	0.44	
Margin of victory		8368		
Turnout		121150		
KEC gain from KC(M)		Swing		

Local body-wise votes in the 2026 Kerala Legislative Assembly election
Local body	No. of polling stations	UDF	LDF	BJP/NDA	Leading alliance	Lead
Kurichy	38	9,070	9,909	2,688	LDF	839
Vazhappally	40	11,678	9,275	2,814	UDF	2,403
Madappally	30	9,231	6,106	2,016	UDF	3,125
Thrikkodithanam	35	8,885	8,205	2,617	UDF	680
Changanassery Municipality	40	9,823	8,144	3,112	UDF	1,679
Paippad	22	6,307	5,319	1,292	UDF	988
Total EVM votes		54,994	46,958	14,539	UDF	8,036
Postal ballot votes		997	665	264	UDF	332
Final constituency total		55,991	47,623	14,803	UDF	8,368

=== 2021 ===
C. F. Thomas, who had represented the constituency for 40 years, died in September 2020. Because of the COVID-19 pandemic and also the nearby legislative assembly elections, a by-election was not held. The Kerala Congress (M) had left the UDF and had joined the LDF. The Kerala Congress (Joseph) tied up with the Kerala Congress led by P. C. Thomas and contested the elections as Kerala Congress for the UDF. Kerala Congress lost in eight of the ten seats they contested, including Changanassery. The incumbent seat holding Kerala Congress (M) won the seat.

2021 Kerala Legislative Assembly election: Changanassery
Party	Candidate	Votes	%	±%
KC(M)	Job Maichil	55,425	44.85	▲4.81
KEC	V. J. Laly	49,366	39.94	−
BJP	Adv. G Raman Nair	14,491	11.73	▼5.33
Independent	Tijo Karikkanadam	1094	0.89	−
BSP	Amruth Dev T	1,079	0.87	▲0.33
SDPI	M. K. Nizamuddin	1,075	0.87	▼0.56
NOTA	None of the Above	434	0.35	▼0.1
SUCI(C)	Rejitha Jayaram	328	0.27	▲0.02
Independent	Joemon Joseph Srampickal	157	0.13	−
Independent	Babychen Mukkadan	136	0.11	−
Margin of victory		6,059	4.91	▲3.44
Turnout		1,23,585	70.23	▼5.02
LDF gain from UDF		Swing		

=== 2016 ===
There were 1,67,180 registered voters in the constituency for the 2016 Kerala Assembly election.

2016 Kerala Legislative Assembly election: Changanassery
Party	Candidate	Votes	%	±%
KC(M)	C. F. Thomas	50,371	40.04	▼7.09
JKC	K. C. Joseph	48,522	38.57	−
BJP	Ettumanoor Radhakrishnan	21,455	17.06	▲11.26
SDPI	Althaph Hassan	1,797	1.43	▲0.59
Independent	Sojan Paviyanose	1,050	0.83	−
BSP	Raji Rajan	676	0.54	▼0.44
Independent	Suresh K.	596	0.47	−
NOTA	None of the above	571	0.45	−
SUCI(C)	K .N. Rajan	312	0.25	▼0.01
Kerala Congress (Secular)	Babu Varghese	292	0.23	−
Independent	Kunjimon Abraham	151	0.12	−
Margin of victory		1,849	1.47	▼0.89
Turnout		1,25,793	75.24	▲2.68
KC(M) hold		Swing	▼7.09	

=== 2011 ===
There were 1,49,193 registered voters in the constituency for the 2011 election.

2011 Kerala Legislative Assembly election: Changanassery
Party	Candidate	Votes	%	±%
KC(M)	C. F. Thomas	51,019	47.13	▼4.98
CPI(M)	B. Ekbal	48,465	44.77	▲2.63
BJP	M. B. Rajagopal	6,281	5.80	▲2.14
BSP	Mathews John	1,058	0.98	▼0.12
SDPI	Mansoor	907	0.84	▼1.00
SUCI(C)	K. Sadanandan	281	0.26	−
Independent	Naseer K. M.	246	0.23	
Margin of victory		2,554	2.36	▼7.61
Turnout		1,08,257	72.56	▲4.78
KC(M) hold		Swing	▼4.98	

=== 2006 ===
There were 1,42,799 registered voters in the constituency for the 2006 election.

2006 Kerala Legislative Assembly election: Changanassery
Party	Candidate	Votes	%	±%
KC(M)	C. F. Thomas	50,435	52.11	▲0.08
CPI(M)	A. V. Russel	40,782	42.14	▲2.60
BJP	Sailamma Rajappan	3,544	3.66	▼3.17
BSP	Rajeev	1,061	1.10	
Independent	K. Sadanandan	557	0.58	
Independent	Raghunathan	404	0.42	
Rejected	Rejected & Missing Votes	12		
Margin of victory		9,653	9.97	▼2.68
Turnout		96,783	67.78	▼0.20
KC(M) hold		Swing	▲0.08	

=== 2001 ===
There were 1,51,747 registered voters in the constituency for the 2001 election.

2001 Kerala Legislative Assembly election: Changanassery
Party	Candidate	Votes	%	±%
KC(M)	C. F. Thomas	53,824	52.19	
CPI(M)	James Manimala	40,783	39.54	
BJP	P. K. Balakrishna Kurup	7,041	6.83	
Independent	Mini K. Philip	1,474	1.43	
Rejected	Rejected & Missing Votes	28		
Margin of victory		13,041	12.65	
Turnout		1,03,160	67.98	
KC(M) hold		Swing		

== See also ==
- Changanassery
- Kottayam district
- List of constituencies of the Kerala Legislative Assembly
- 2016 Kerala Legislative Assembly election
