= N. Rajagopalan Nair =

Indian politician

Member of the Kerala Legislative Assembly
- In office 16 March 1957 – 31 July 1959
- Preceded by: Position Established
- Succeeded by: R. Balakrishna Pillai
- Constituency: Pathanapuram

Personal details
- Born: 10 May 1925
- Died: 2 January 1993 (aged 67)
- Party: Communist Party of India
- As of 28 November, 2011 Source: Niyamasabha

N. Rajagopalan Nair (10 May 1925 – 2 January 1993) was an Indian politician and leader of Communist Party of India. He represented Pathanapuram constituency in 1st Kerala Legislative Assembly. He was also member at Travancore Cochin Legislative Assembly from 1952 to 1954.

A law graduate, he joined the Congress in 1940. He was active in student politics, later joined the Income Tax Department. However, he was soon fired and had to serve time in prison in 1949–50. He was the Punalur Grama Panchayat President and trade union leader, was above all a Harikatha artist.
