= E. K. Pillai =

Indian politician

Member of the Kerala Legislative Assembly
- In office 1977–1982
- Preceded by: P. K. Raghavan
- Succeeded by: A. George
- Constituency: Pathanapuram

Personal details
- Born: May 4, 1926
- Died: July 12, 2000 (aged 74)
- Party: Communist Party of India
- As of November 28, 2011 Source: Niyamasabha

E. K. Pillai (4 May 1926 – 12 July 2000) was an Indian politician and leader of Communist Party of India. He represented Pathanapuram constituency in 5th and 6th Kerala Legislative Assembly.
