= Mavelikara Lok Sabha constituency =

Lok Sabha Constituency in Kerala

Coordinates: 9.24°N 76.54°E

Mavelikara KL-16
- Lok Sabha constituency
- Mavelikara Lok Sabha constituency

Constituency details
- Country: India
- Region: South India
- State: Kerala
- Assembly constituencies: Changanassery; Kuttanad; Mavelikara; Chengannur; Kunnathur; Kottarakkara; Pathanapuram
- Established: 1962
- Total electors: 13,01,067 (2019)
- Reservation: SC

Member of Parliament
- 18th Lok Sabha
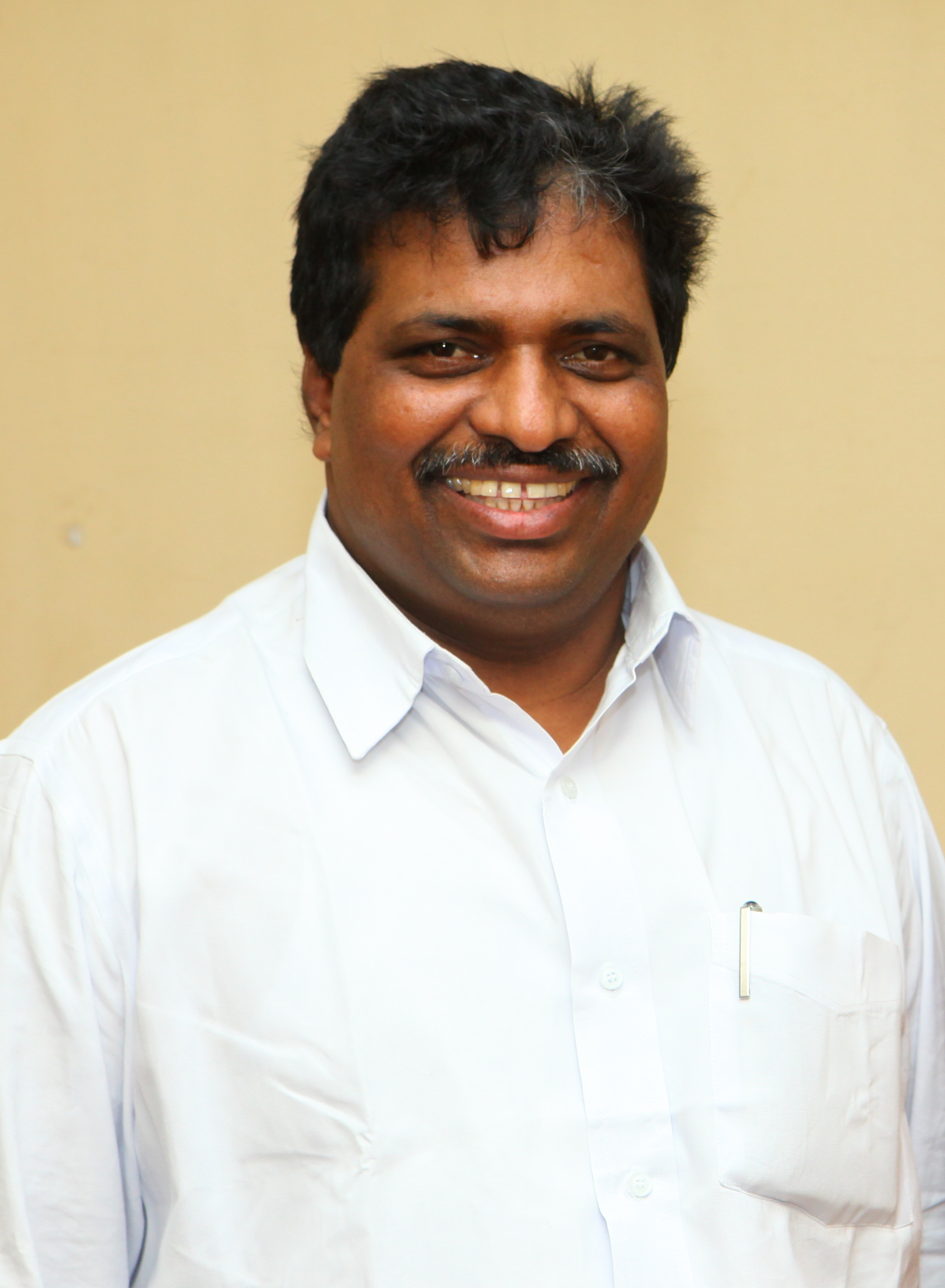
- Incumbent Kodikunnil Suresh
- Party: INC
- Alliance: UDF
- Elected year: 2024

Mavelikara is one of the 20 Lok Sabha (parliamentary) constituencies in Kerala state in southern India.

== Assembly segments ==
Mavelikkara Lok Sabha constituency is composed of the following assembly regions:

| No | Name | District | Member | Party | 2024 Lead |
|---|---|---|---|---|---|
| 99 | Changanassery | Kottayam | Vinu Job Kuzhimannil | KEC | INC |
| 106 | Kuttanad | Alappuzha | Reji Cheriyan | KEC | INC |
| 109 | Mavelikara(SC) | Alappuzha | M. S. Arun Kumar | CPI(M) | CPI |
| 110 | Chengannur | Alappuzha | Saji Cherian | CPI(M) | INC |
| 118 | Kunnathur (SC) | Kollam | Ullas Kovoor | RSP | CPI |
| 119 | Kottarakkara | Kollam | K. N. Balagopal | CPI(M) | CPI |
| 120 | Pathanapuram | Kollam | Jyothi Kumar Chamakkala | INC | INC |

== Members of Parliament ==
As Thiruvalla

| Election | Lok Sabha | Member | Party | Tenure |
|---|---|---|---|---|
| 1952 | 1st | C. P. Mathen | Indian National Congress | 1952-1957 |
| 1957 | 2nd | P. K. Vasudevan Nair | Communist Party of India | 1957-1962 |
| 1962 | 3rd | Ravindra Varma | Indian National Congress | 1962-1967 |

As Mavelikara General constituency

| Election | Lok Sabha | Member | Party | Tenure |
|---|---|---|---|---|
| 1962 | 3rd | R. Achuthan | Indian National Congress | 1962-1967 |
| 1967 | 4th | G. P. Mangalathumadom | Samyukta Socialist Party | 1967-1971 |
| 1971 | 5th | R. Balakrishna Pillai | Kerala Congress | 1971-1977 |
| 1977 | 6th | B. K. Nair | Indian National Congress | 1977-1980 |
| 1980 | 7th | P. J. Kurien | Indian National Congress (U) | 1980-1984 |
| 1984 | 8th | Thampan Thomas | Janata Party | 1984-1989 |
| 1989 | 9th | P. J. Kurien | Indian National Congress | 1989-1991 |
| 1991 | 10th | P. J. Kurien | Indian National Congress | 1991-1996 |
| 1996 | 11th | P. J. Kurien | Indian National Congress | 1996-1998 |
| 1998 | 12th | P. J. Kurien | Indian National Congress | 1998-1999 |
| 1999 | 13th | Ramesh Chennithala | Indian National Congress | 1999-2004 |
| 2004 | 14th | C. S. Sujatha | Communist Party of India (Marxist) | 2004-2009 |

As Mavelikara (SC)

| Election | Lok Sabha | Member | Party | Tenure |
|---|---|---|---|---|
| 2009 | 15th | Kodikunnil Suresh | Indian National Congress | 2009-2014 |
| 2014 | 16th | Kodikunnil Suresh | Indian National Congress | 2014-2019 |
| 2019 | 17th | Kodikunnil Suresh | Indian National Congress | 2019-2024 |
| 2024 | 18th | Kodikunnil Suresh | Indian National Congress | Incumbent |

== Election results ==
=== General Elections 2029 ===
2029 Indian general election: Mavelikara
| Party | Candidate | Votes | % | ±% |
|---|---|---|---|---|
| UDF | | | | |
| LDF | | | | |
| NDA | | | | |
| NOTA | None of the above | | | |
| Margin of victory | | | | |
| Turnout | | | | |
| | | Swing | | |

=== General Election 2024 ===
2024 Indian general election: Mavelikara
| Party | Candidate | Votes | % | ±% |
|---|---|---|---|---|
| INC | Kodikunnil Suresh | 369,516 | 41.29 | ▼4.07 |
| CPI | Adv. C. A. Arun Kumar | 358,648 | 40.07 | ▲1.01 |
| BDJS | Baiju Kalasala | 142,984 | 15.98 | ▲2.23 |
| NOTA | None of the above | 9,883 | 1.1 | ▲0.51 |
| Independent | C. Monichen | 4,974 | 0.6 | |
| BSP | Santhosh Palathumpadan | 4,306 | 0.5 | |
| API | Suresh Nooranad | 1,505 | 0.2 | |
| SUCI(C) | K. Bimalji | 1,370 | 0.2 | ▲0.05 |
| Independent | Manthara Velayudhan | 929 | 0.1 | |
| Independent | Kozhuvasseril Suresh | 856 | 0.1 | |
| Majority | | 10,868 | 1.22 | ▼5.07 |
| Turnout | | 8,98,111 | 67.07 | ▼7.26 |
| INC hold | | Swing | ▼4.07 | |

By Assembly Segments
| No. | Status (Assembly Constituency) | Votes | | | Lead |
| No. | Status (Assembly Constituency) | INC (UDF) | CPI (LDF) | BDJS (NDA) | Lead |
|---|---|---|---|---|---|
| 99 | Changanassery | 54,843 | 38,393 | 14,276 | 16,450 |
| 106 | Kuttanad | 45,736 | 44,865 | 15,553 | 871 |
| 109 | Mavelikara (SC) | 49,317 | 55,483 | 24,584 | 6,166 |
| 110 | Chengannur | 49,031 | 47,393 | 25,424 | 1,638 |
| 118 | Kunnathur (SC) | 59,155 | 60,502 | 22,473 | 1,347 |
| 119 | Kottarakkara | 53,526 | 56,929 | 20,999 | 3,403 |
| 120 | Pathanapuram | 50,601 | 49,143 | 17,261 | 1,458 |

=== 2019 ===
2019 Indian general elections: Mavelikara
| Party | Candidate | Votes | % | ±% |
|---|---|---|---|---|
| INC | Kodikunnil Suresh | 440,415 | 45.36 | ▲0.11 |
| CPI | Chittayam Gopakumar | 379,277 | 39.06 | ▼2.51 |
| BDJS | Thazhava Sahadevan | 133,546 | 13.75 | ▲4.78 |
| NOTA | None of the above | 5,754 | 0.59 | ▼0.47 |
| BSP | Thollur Rajagopalan | 3,864 | 0.4 | − |
| Independent | Kuttan Kattachira | 1,982 | 0.2 | |
| Independent | Usha Kottarakkara | 1,620 | 0.2 | |
| SUCI(C) | K. Bimalji | 1,450 | 0.15 | ▼0.35 |
| Independent | Raghavan R. | 1,314 | 0.1 | |
| Independent | Ajayakumar | 1,211 | 0.1 | |
| Independent | Aji Pathanapuram | 602 | 0.1 | |
| Margin of victory | | 61,138 | 6.29 | ▲2.61 |
| Turnout | | 9,72,360 | 74.33 | ▲2.98 |
| INC hold | | Swing | ▲0.11 | |

By Assembly Segments
| No. | Status (Assembly Constituency) | Votes | | | Lead |
| No. | Status (Assembly Constituency) | INC (UDF) | CPI (LDF) | BDJS (NDA) | Lead |
|---|---|---|---|---|---|
| 99 | Changanassery | 64,368 | 40,958 | 13,884 | 23,410 |
| 106 | Kuttanad | 55,253 | 52,630 | 14,476 | 2,623 |
| 109 | Mavelikara (SC) | 60,392 | 59,423 | 23,387 | 969 |
| 110 | Chengannur | 61,242 | 51,403 | 24,854 | 9,839 |
| 118 | Kunnathur (SC) | 69,500 | 62,327 | 21,136 | 7,173 |
| 119 | Kottarakkara | 62,998 | 60,224 | 19,091 | 2,754 |
| 120 | Pathanapuram | 64,244 | 49,512 | 15,495 | 14,732 |

=== General election 2014 ===
2014 Indian general elections: Mavelikara
| Party | Candidate | Votes | % | ±% |
|---|---|---|---|---|
| INC | Kodikunnil Suresh | 402,432 | 45.25 | ▼4.17 |
| CPI | Chengara Surendran | 369,695 | 41.57 | ▼1.87 |
| BJP | P. Sudheer | 79,743 | 8.97 | ▲3.87 |
| NOTA | None of the above | 9,459 | 1.06 | −−− |
| SDPI | Jyothish Perumpulickal | 8,946 | 1.0 | |
| AAP | N. Sadanandan | 7,753 | 0.9 | |
| SUCI(C) | Sasikala K. S. | 4,736 | 0.5 | |
| BSP | Adv. P. K. Jayakrishnan | 3,603 | 0.4 | ▼0.7 |
| Independent | Pallickal Surendran | 1,486 | 0.2 | |
| Independent | Piravathoor Sreedharan | 1,207 | 0.1 | |
| Margin of victory | | 32,737 | 3.68 | ▼2.30 |
| Turnout | | 889,060 | 71.35 | ▲0.85 |
| INC hold | | Swing | ▼4.17 | |

By Assembly Segments
| No. | Status (Assembly Constituency) | Votes | | | Lead |
| No. | Status (Assembly Constituency) | INC (UDF) | CPI(M) (LDF) | BJP (NDA) | Lead |
|---|---|---|---|---|---|
| 99 | Changanassery | 52,020 | 41,624 | 9,239 | 10,396 |
| 106 | Kuttanad | 51,703 | 50,508 | 8,739 | 1,195 |
| 109 | Mavelikara (SC) | 54,883 | 61,350 | 13,067 | 6,467 |
| 110 | Chengannur | 55,769 | 47,951 | 15,716 | 7,818 |
| 118 | Kunnathur (SC) | 63,686 | 63,599 | 11,902 | 87 |
| 119 | Kottarakkara | 61,444 | 56,799 | 11,785 | 4,645 |
| 120 | Pathanapuram | 61,980 | 47,061 | 9,218 | 14,919 |

=== 2009 ===
2009 Indian general elections: Mavelikara
| Party | Candidate | Votes | % | ±% |
|---|---|---|---|---|
| INC | Kodikunnil Suresh | 397,211 | 49.57 | ▲7.2 |
| CPI | R. S. Anil | 349,163 | 43.58 | − |
| BJP | P. M. Velayudhan | 40,992 | 5.12 | ▼7.8 |
| BSP | Dr. N. D. Mohan | 8,681 | 1.08 | ▲0.3 |
| Independent | Sooranad Sukumaran | 3,197 | 0.40 | |
| SUCI(C) | K. S. Sasikala | 2,369 | 0.30 | |
| Independent | G. Anil Kumar | 2,189 | 0.27 | |
| Margin of victory | | 48,048 | 6.0 | ▲4.8 |
| Turnout | | 803,802 | 70.31 | ▼3.3 |
| INC gain from CPI(M) | | Swing | ▲7.2 | |

By Assembly Segments (2009)

| No. | Constituency | Party | Lead |
|---|---|---|---|
| 99 | Changanassery | INC | 17,086 |
| 106 | Kuttanad | INC | 4,429 |
| 109 | Mavelikara (SC) | CPI | 696 |
| 110 | Chengannur | INC | 10,591 |
| 118 | Kunnathur (SC) | INC | 2,026 |
| 119 | Kottarakkara | INC | 3,591 |
| 120 | Pathanapuram | INC | 11,213 |

=== 2004 ===
2004 Indian general elections: Mavelikara
| Party | Candidate | Votes | % | ±% |
|---|---|---|---|---|
| CPI(M) | C. S. Sujatha | 278,281 | 43.17 | |
| INC | Ramesh Chennithala | 270,867 | 42.02 | |
| BJP | S. Krishnakumar | 83,013 | 12.88 | |
| BSP | Adv. Saji K. Cheraman | 4,918 | 0.76 | |
| Social Action | Adv. V. C. Zachariah | 2,987 | 0.46 | |
| Independent | S. Radhamani | 2,353 | 0.37 | |
| Independent | Dr K Kishorekumar | 1,298 | 0.20 | |
| Independent | R. Kavitha | 897 | 0.14 | |
| Margin of victory | | 7,414 | 1.15 | |
| Turnout | | 6,44,614 | 73.98 | |
| CPI(M) gain from INC | | Swing | | |

By Assembly Segments (2004)

| No. | Constituency | Party | Lead |
|---|---|---|---|
| 104 | Kayamkulam | CPI(M) | 6,657 |
| 105 | Thiruvalla | INC | 8,345 |
| 106 | Kallooppara | INC | 3,540 |
| 107 | Aranmula | INC | 158 |
| 108 | Chengannur | INC | 1,546 |
| 109 | Mavelikara | CPI(M) | 7,814 |
| 110 | Pandalam | CPI(M) | 6,153 |

=== 1999 ===
1999 Indian general elections: Mavelikara
| Party | Candidate | Votes | % | ±% |
|---|---|---|---|---|
| INC | Ramesh Chennithala | 310,455 | 46.76 | |
| Independent | Ninan Koshy | 277,012 | 41.72 | |
| BJP | K. Raman Pillai | 73,668 | 11.10 | |
| Independent | Anil Thomas | 1,128 | 0.17 | |
| Independent | Ninan K. Daniel | 896 | 0.13 | |
| Independent | Niranam Rajan | 748 | 0.11 | |
| Margin of victory | | 33,433 | 5.04 | |
| Turnout | | 663,907 | 70.85 | |
| INC hold | | Swing | | |

By Assembly Segments (1999)

| No. | Constituency | Party | Lead |
|---|---|---|---|
| 104 | Kayamkulam | INC | 5,249 |
| 105 | Thiruvalla | INC | 7,720 |
| 106 | Kallooppara | INC | 5,990 |
| 107 | Aranmula | INC | 4,681 |
| 108 | Chengannur | INC | 4,400 |
| 109 | Mavelikara | INC | 3,638 |
| 110 | Pandalam | INC | 1,727 |

=== 1998 ===
1998 Indian general election: Mavelikara
| Party | Candidate | Votes | % | ±% |
|---|---|---|---|---|
| INC | P. J. Kurien | 275,001 | 44.26 | |
| Independent | Ninan Koshy | 273,740 | 44.06 | |
| BJP | Rajan Moolaveettil | 68,450 | 11.02 | |
| BSP | K. Sasikumar | 3,185 | 0.51 | |
| Independent | C. S. Kanakambaran | 983 | 0.16 | |
| Margin of victory | | 1,261 | 0.20 | |
| Turnout | | 6,21,359 | 69.53 | |
| INC hold | | Swing | | |

=== 1996 ===
1996 Indian general election: Mavelikara
| Party | Candidate | Votes | % | ±% |
|---|---|---|---|---|
| INC | P. J. Kurien | 290,524 | 47.02 | |
| CPI(M) | M. R. Gopalakrishnan | 269,448 | 43.61 | |
| BJP | K. K. R. Kumar | 45,325 | 7.34 | |
| Independent | Niranam Rajan | 5,710 | 0.92 | |
| Independent | Prakash P. Thomas | 5,668 | 0.92 | |
| Independent | C. R. Karoli | 1,134 | 0.18 | |
| Margin of victory | | 21,076 | 3.41 | |
| Turnout | | 6,17,809 | 70.09 | |
| INC hold | | Swing | | |

=== 1991 ===
1991 Indian general election: Mavelikara
| Party | Candidate | Votes | % | ±% |
|---|---|---|---|---|
| INC | P. J. Kurien | 304,519 | 49.09 | |
| CPI(M) | K. Suresh Kurup | 279,031 | 44.98 | |
| BJP | C. Gopalakrishnan Nair | 25,665 | 4.14 | |
| SJP | Thomas Kuthiravattom | 5,018 | 0.81 | |
| Independent | Niranam Rajan | 3,441 | 0.55 | |
| BSP | Samkutty Jacob | 2,655 | 0.43 | |
| Margin of victory | | 25,488 | 4.11 | |
| Turnout | | 6,20,329 | 71.94 | |
| INC hold | | Swing | | |

=== 1989 ===
1989 Indian general election: Mavelikara
| Party | Candidate | Votes | % | ±% |
|---|---|---|---|---|
| INC | P. J. Kurien | 334,864 | 51.15 | |
| JD | Thampan Thomas | 277,682 | 42.41 | |
| BJP | Prathapachandra Varma | 30,229 | 4.62 | |
| JP | S. Jayasankar | 6,554 | 1.00 | |
| Independent | M. K. Ramesh Babu | 1,961 | 0.30 | |
| BSP | C. K. John | 1,725 | 0.26 | |
| Independent | C. R. Karoli | 743 | 0.11 | |
| Independent | Niranam Rajan | 561 | 0.09 | |
| Independent | Thankan | 192 | 0.03 | |
| Independent | Mavelikara Sudarsanan | 189 | 0.03 | |
| Margin of victory | | 57,182 | 8.74 | |
| Turnout | | 6,54,700 | 78.14 | |
| INC gain from JP | | Swing | | |

=== 1984 ===
1984 Indian general election: Mavelikara
| Party | Candidate | Votes | % | ±% |
|---|---|---|---|---|
| JP | Thampan Thomas | 232,339 | 46.52 | |
| NDP | T. N. Upendranatha Kurup | 231,052 | 46.26 | |
| BJP | P. K. Vishnu Namboothiri | 25,124 | 5.03 | |
| Independent | C. George | 5,119 | 1.02 | |
| Independent | Chellappan Pillai | 3,364 | 0.67 | |
| Independent | M. Gopalakrishna Panicker | 2,465 | 0.49 | |
| Margin of victory | | 1,287 | 0.26 | |
| Turnout | | 4,99,463 | 74.70 | |
| JP gain from INC(U) | | Swing | | |

=== 1980 ===
1980 Indian general election: Mavelikara
| Party | Candidate | Votes | % | ±% |
|---|---|---|---|---|
| INC(U) | P. J. Kurien | 226,645 | 54.09 | |
| NDP | Thevally Madhavan Pillai | 163,523 | 39.03 | |
| Independent | C. C. Thampi | 27,635 | 6.60 | |
| Independent | T. Kesava Pillai | 1,186 | 0.28 | |
| Margin of victory | | 63,122 | 15.06 | |
| Turnout | | 4,18,919 | 67.62 | |
| INC(U) gain from INC | | Swing | | |

=== 1977 ===
1977 Indian general election: Mavelikara
| Party | Candidate | Votes | % | ±% |
|---|---|---|---|---|
| INC | B. K. Nair | 238,169 | 53.61 | |
| Independent | B. G. Varghese | 181,617 | 40.88 | |
| Independent | K. Gopalakrishnan | 24,450 | 5.50 | |
| Margin of victory | | 56,552 | 12.73 | |
| Turnout | | 4,44,236 | 79.46 | |
| INC gain from KEC | | Swing | | |

=== 1971 ===
1971 Indian general election: Mavelikara
| Party | Candidate | Votes | % | ±% |
|---|---|---|---|---|
| KEC | R. Balakrishna Pillai | 212,210 | 56.01 | |
| CPI(M) | S. Ramachandran Pillai | 156,683 | 41.36 | |
| Independent | C. Thomas | 9,969 | 2.63 | |
| Margin of victory | | 55,527 | 14.65 | |
| Turnout | | 3,78,862 | 74.22 | |
| KEC gain from SSP | | Swing | | |

=== 1967 ===
1967 Indian general election: Mavelikara
| Party | Candidate | Votes | % | ±% |
|---|---|---|---|---|
| SSP | G. P. Mangalathumadom | 147,872 | 42.24 | |
| INC | M. P. S. V. Pillai | 129,178 | 36.90 | |
| KEC | M. G. Pillai | 72,991 | 20.85 | |
| Margin of victory | | 18,694 | 5.34 | |
| Turnout | | 3,61,923 | 78.70 | |
| SSP gain from INC | | Swing | | |

== See also ==
- Mavelikara
- List of constituencies of the Lok Sabha
- Indian general election, 2014 (Kerala)
- 2014 Indian general election
