= R. Balakrishna Pillai =

Indian politician (1935–2021)

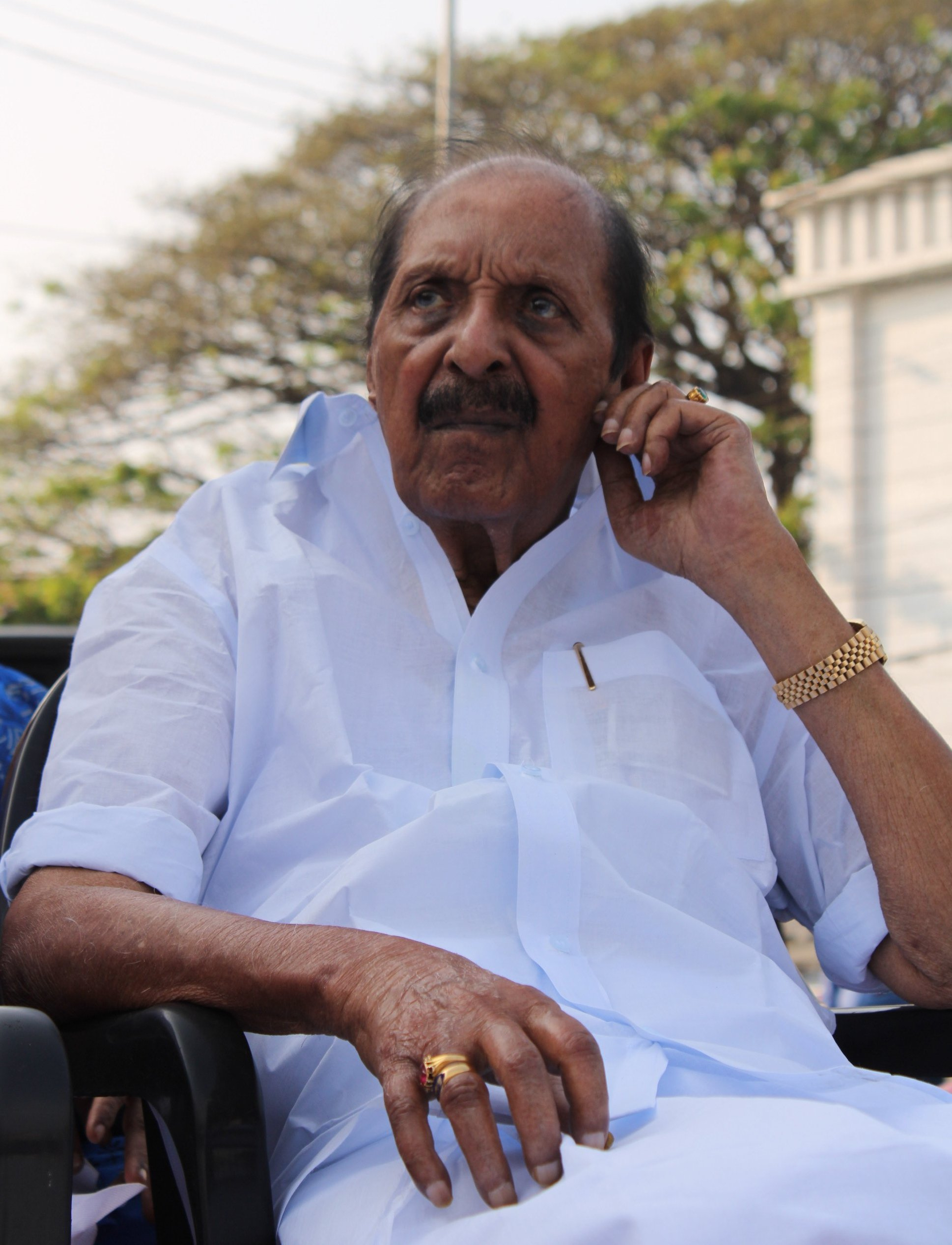

Minister for Transport, Government of Kerala
- In office 10 March 2003 – 29 August 2004
- Preceded by: Ganesh Kumar
- Succeeded by: N. Sakthan
- In office 22 March 1995 – 28 July 1995
- Preceded by: Himself
- Succeeded by: P. R. Kurup
- In office 24 June 1991 – 16 March 1995
- Preceded by: K. Sankaranarayanan Pillai
- Succeeded by: Himself
- In office 26 December 1975 – 25 June 1976
- Preceded by: M. N. Govindan Nair
- Succeeded by: K. M. George

Minister for Electricity, Government of Kerala
- In office 25 May 1986 – 25 March 1987
- Preceded by: K. M. Mani (Additional Charge)
- Succeeded by: T. Sivadasa Menon
- In office 24 May 1982 – 5 June 1985
- Preceded by: K. Karunakaran
- Succeeded by: K. M. Mani (Additional Charge)
- In office 25 January 1980 – 20 October 1981
- Preceded by: Dr. A. Neelalohithadasan Nadar
- Succeeded by: K. Karunakaran

Member of Parliament, Lok Sabha
- In office 1971–1977
- Preceded by: G. P. Mangalathumadom
- Succeeded by: B. K. Nair
- Constituency: Mavelikara

Member of the Kerala Legislative Assembly
- In office 25 March 1977 – 12 May 2006
- Preceded by: Kottara Gopalakrishnan
- Succeeded by: P. Aisha Potty
- Constituency: Kottarakkara
- In office 1960 – 1965
- Preceded by: N. Rajagopalan Nair
- Succeeded by: P. K. Raghavan
- Constituency: Pathanapuram

Chairman of the Kerala State Welfare Corporation for Forward Communities
- In office 17 May 2017 – 3 May 2021
- Preceded by: Justice A.V. Ramakrishna Pillai
- Succeeded by: K. G. Premjith
- In office 23 July 2013 – 26 January 2015
- Preceded by: Office established
- Succeeded by: Justice A.V. Ramakrishna Pillai

Personal details
- Born: 3 April 1934 Valakom, Kottarakara, Kingdom of Travancore
- Died: 3 May 2021 (aged 87) Kottarakara, Kollam, Kerala, India
- Party: Indian National Congress (1950s‍–‍1964); Kerala Congress (1964‍–‍1977, 1985‍–‍1991); Kerala Congress (B) (1977‍–‍1985, 1991‍–‍2021)
- Spouse: Vatsala (died 2018)
- Children: 3 (incl. Ganesh Kumar)
- Occupation: Politician

Keezhoote Raman Balakrishna Pillai (3 April 1934 – 3 May 2021) was an Indian politician who served as minister of the state of Kerala in India, holding portfolios such as Transport and Electricity. He was a member of the Kerala Legislative Assembly from Kottarakara constituency in Kollam district for almost three decades. He was the Chairman of Kerala Congress (B). Throughout his political career, Pillai remained a controversial figure in Kerala state politics. He was the first Kerala minister to be imprisoned for corruption. A consummate politician, he had the rare honour of serving as grama panchayat president and Cabinet Minister at the same time in the mid-1990s.

Gandeevam, a biography of Pillai written by Vrindavanam Venugopalan with a foreword by Sooranad Kunjan Pillai, was published by Viswakeralam Daily. Pillai's autobiography was published by DC Books in 2011. He also acted in two Malayalam movies in 1979 and 1980 - Vedikkettu and Ival Oru Naadody. Prisoner 5990 is his autobiography.

== Personal life ==
Balakrishna Pillai was born on 3 April 1934, in Valakom near Kottarakkara in Kollam district, as the son of Keezhoote Raman Pillai, a member of the Sree Moolam Popular Assembly and Karthyayani Amma. His father was a wealthy Nair landlord with plenty of land in the present-day Kerala and Tamil Nadu states. He was married to Vatsalakumari and has two daughters and a son. The latter, K. B. Ganesh Kumar, is a film actor and politician who served as a state minister during 2001–03, 2011–13, and 2023-26. His wife Vatsalakumari died on 3 January 2018 aged 76.

Pillai died on 3 May 2021, at Vijaya hospital in Kottarakkara. He was admitted to the hospital a few days earlier owing to respiratory issues and was on ventilator support. His body was cremated with full state honours at his home in Kottarakkara. He is survived by his three children - two daughters named Usha and Bindu, and his only son Ganesh Kumar. Valsala, his wife, predeceased him in 2018.

== Political career ==
=== Student politics ===
R. Balakrishna Pillai was a member of Thiruvathankur Students' Union (which later became Tirukochi Vidyarthi Federation and later Kerala Students' Union).

=== Indian National Congress ===
Balakrishna Pillai later joined the Indian National Congress (INC). In 1960, he became member of the Kerala Pradesh Congress Committee executive and of the All India Congress Committee.

He was elected to the Kerala Legislative Assembly for the first time in 1960 from the Pathanapuram Assembly Constituency of Kollam district, as an INC candidate, at the age of 25 and holds the record for becoming the youngest MLA of Kerala.

=== Kerala Congress formation ===
In 1964, fifteen MLAs led by K. M. George (including Balakrishna Pillai) left the Congress and formed a regional party called the Kerala Congress, with George as the chairman and Pillai as general secretary. Pillai won the elections from his home constituency Kottarakara in 1965 but was defeated in the next two elections of 1967 and 1970. He was elected to the Lok Sabha in the 1971 General Election from Mavelikara constituency and served as the Member of Parliament (MP) until 1977.

From December 1975 to June 1976, he served as the Minister for Transport, Excise and Jails in the Kerala Cabinet.

=== Kerala Congress split ===
After the death of K. M. George in 1976, there was tussle for control of the party between Balakrishna Pillai and K. M. Mani. In 1977, the party split into the Mani and Pillai groups. He was re-elected to the state legislature in 1977 and then again in the general elections of 1980, 1982, 1987, 1991, 1996, and 2001, but was defeated in the 2006 election. His victory margin of 37,000 votes in 1980 remained a record for the State Assembly polls for more than a quarter century.

He was a founder member of United Democratic Front (UDF). He was Minister for several years starting in different Ministries headed by C. Achutha Menon, K. Karunakaran, E. K. Nayanar, and A. K. Antony.

== Punishment by Supreme Court ==
The government appointed Justice K. Sukumaran to inquire into allegations related to the Idamalayar and Kallada Dam construction projects. Based on his report, R. Balakrishna Pillai and others were prosecuted by a Special Court. The Supreme Court on 10 February 2011 sentenced R. Balakrishna Pillai and two others to one-year imprisonment for allegedly abusing their position in the award of a contract for the Edamalayar hydroelectric power project. The apex court bench of Justices P. Sathasivam and B. S. Chauhan reversed the Kerala High Court judgment which had acquitted all three. Chief Minister V. S. Achuthanandan had moved the Supreme Court, in his personal capacity, challenging the verdict of acquittal and the apex court allowed Achuthanandan's appeal.

== Filmography ==
- Mukhyamanthri
- Vedikkettu
- Ival Oru Naadody
- Neelasaree
