= K. G. Neelakantan Nambudiripad =

Indian politician

K. G. Neelakantan Nambudiripad (27 May 1924 – 20 September 2012) was an Indian politician and leader of Communist Party of India. He represented the Changanassery constituency in the 3rd Kerala Legislative Assembly.
