= Vedikkettu =

- Theatrical release poster
- Directed by: K. A. Sivadas
- Written by: Thevannur Maniraj; T. V. Gopalakrishnan (dialogues)
- Screenplay by: T. V. Gopalakrishnan
- Produced by: Thevannur Maniraj; Santha Gopinathan Nair
- Starring: Sukumaran; Jalaja; Prameela; Ramesh
- Cinematography: G. V. Suresh
- Edited by: K. Sankunni
- Music by: M. K. Arjunan
- Production company: Masi Pictures
- Distributed by: Masi Pictures
- Release date: 27 September 1980
- Country: India
- Language: Malayalam

Vedikkettu (transl. Firework) is a 1980 Indian Malayalam-language film directed by K. A. Sivadas and produced by Thevannur Maniraj and Santha Gopinathan Nair. The film stars Sukumaran, Jalaja, Prameela and Ramesh in the lead roles. The film has musical score by M. K. Arjunan.

== Cast ==
- Sukumaran
- Jalaja
- Prameela
- Ramesh
- Alummoodan
- G. K. Pillai
- Kaduvakulam Antony
- Kottarakkara Sreedharan Nair
- Kuthiravattam Pappu
- Nellikode Bhaskaran
- Stanley
- Vettoor Purushan
- Vijaya Kumari
- R. Balakrishna Pillai
- Kollam G. K. Pillai

== Soundtrack ==
The music was composed by M. K. Arjunan.

No.	Song	Singers	Lyrics	Length (m:ss)
1	"Maanam Irundu"	K. J. Yesudas		
2	"Paalaruvikkarayile"	Vani Jairam		
