= Jyothikumar Chamakkala =

Indian politician (born 1964)

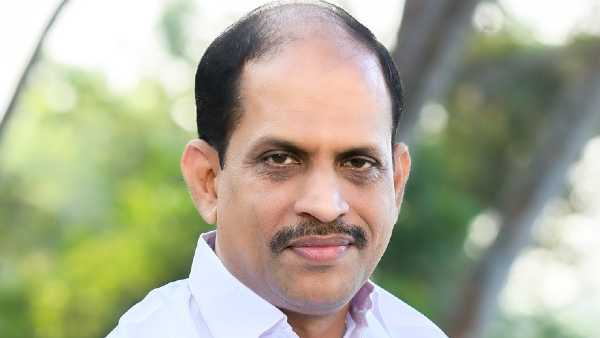
- in 2022

Member of the Kerala Legislative Assembly
- Incumbent
- Assumed office May 2026
- Preceded by: K. B. Ganesh Kumar
- Constituency: Pathanapuram

Personal details
- Born: 1973 (age 52–53) Kollam, Kerala, India
- Party: Indian National Congress
- Spouse: Gayathri
- Children: 2
- Education: University of Kerala (BSc); Kuvempu University (BE)
- Occupation: Politician, Businessman

Jyothikumar Chamakkala (Malayalam: ജ്യോതികുമാർ ചാമക്കാല) is an Indian politician from Kerala belonging to the Indian National Congress. He is the current Member of the Legislative Assembly (MLA) representing the Pathanapuram constituency since 2026.

== Early life and education ==
Jyothikumar Chamakkala was born to Bhaskkara Kurup in Kollam, Kerala. He completed his schooling in Kerala before pursuing higher education in science and engineering. He earned a Bachelor of Science degree in Chemistry from M.G. College, Trivandrum, affiliated with the University of Kerala, in 1992. He later graduated with a Bachelor of Engineering in Mechanical Engineering from the Adichunchanagiri Institute of Technology (AIT) in Chikmagalur, under Kuvempu University, in 1998.

=== Electoral history ===
In the 2021 Kerala Legislative Assembly election, Chamakkala contested from the Pathanapuram constituency. He secured 52,940 votes but was defeated by the incumbent MLA, K. B. Ganesh Kumar, by a margin of 14,336 votes.

In the 2026 Kerala Legislative Assembly election, Chamakkala again contested from Pathanapuram in a high-profile rematch. He won the seat by polling 68,275 votes, defeating K. B. Ganesh Kumar of the Kerala Congress (B) by a margin of 8,310 votes. His victory ended a 25-year tenure held by the Kerala Congress (B) in the constituency.

== Personal life ==
Chamakkala is involved in business ventures outside of his political career. He is married to Gayathri, who serves as an assistant professor and the couple have two daughters.

== Political career ==
Chamakkala is a prominent spokesperson for the Kerala Pradesh Congress Committee (KPCC). In the 2021 Kerala Legislative Assembly election, he contested from Pathanapuram but lost to the incumbent K. B. Ganesh Kumar.

In the 2026 Kerala Legislative Assembly elections, he won the Pathanapuram seat by a margin of 8,310 votes, defeating K. B. Ganesh Kumar of the Kerala Congress (B).
