= Paippad =

- Census Town
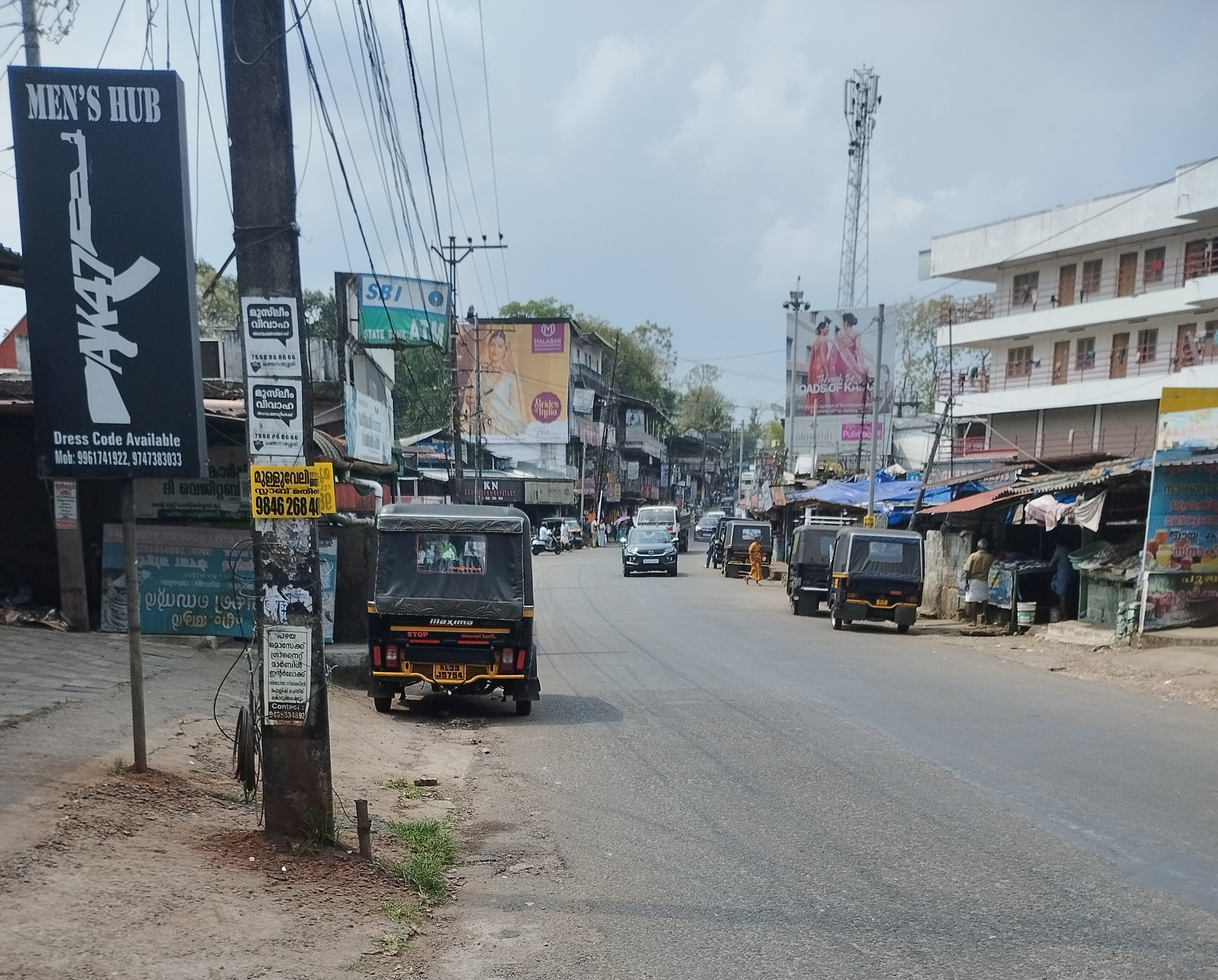

- Location in Kerala, India Paippad (India)
- Coordinates: 9°25′28.8″N 76°35′05.9″E
- Country: India
- State: Kerala
- District: Kottayam

Government
  - Type: Panchayat raj
  - Body: Paippad Grama Panchayat

Area
  - Total: 8.86 km^{2} (3.42 sq mi)

Population (2011)
  - Total: 21,338
  - Density: 2,410/km^{2} (6,240/sq mi)

Languages
  - Official: Malayalam, English
- Time zone: UTC+5:30 (IST)
- Postal codes: 686537, 686548
- Vehicle registration: KL- 33

Paippad is a census town and grama panchayat in Changanassery taluk of Kottayam district in the Indian state of Kerala. It is part of the Changanassery urban agglomeration. It lies approximately 7 km (4.3 mi) southeast of Changanassery and 5 km (3.1 mi) north of Thiruvalla.

== Geography ==
Paippad lies within the Madappally Administrative Block. It is bordered by Changanassery to the Northwest, Thiruvalla to the Southwest, Mallappally to the East and Chengannur to the far South.

== Demographics ==
As per the 2011 Census of India, Paippad had a population of 21,338, comprising 10,321 males and 11,017 females. Children below six years constituted about 9.2% of the population. The town boasts a high literacy rate of 97.7%, well above the state average.

== Administration ==
The town is governed by the Paippad Grama Panchayat under the Madappally Block and Changanassery Taluk. It is responsible for managing civic infrastructure, water supply, sanitation, and local development.

- Lok Sabha constituency: Kottayam Lok Sabha constituency
- Assembly constituency: Changanassery Assembly constituency
- District: Kottayam district

== Economy ==
The local economy is driven by agriculture, retail, and construction. Key crops include rubber, coconut, and bananas. Overseas remittances from Gulf Countries form a substantial part of local household income. Migrant workers from northern India contribute to local industries and labor sectors.

== Education ==
- Government High School, Paippad
- MST Public School (CBSE-affiliated)
- University College of Teacher Education (UCTE), affiliated with Mahatma Gandhi University, Kerala

Nearby major colleges include St. Berchmans College, Changanassery and institutions in Thiruvalla.

== Healthcare ==
Major multi-specialty hospitals accessible from Paippad include:

- Believers Church Medical College Hospital, Thiruvalla (~2.5 km)
- Tiruvalla Medical Mission Hospital, Thiruvalla (~4 km)
- Pushpagiri Medical College Hospital, Thiruvalla (~6 km)

Basic health services are provided by the Government Primary Health Centre (PHC) located within Paippad.

== Transportation ==
- Roads: Located on National Highway 183 (India) (Changanassery–Kaviyoor corridor)
- Bus: KSRTC and private services to Changanassery, Thiruvalla, Mallappally, and Chengannur
- Rail: Nearest stations – Changanasseri railway station (7 km), Tiruvalla railway station (5 km), Chengannur railway station (14 km)
- Airports: Cochin International Airport (~110 km), Trivandrum International Airport (~130 km)

== Religious Places of Worship ==
- Temple - Paippad Sree Puthenkavu Bhagavathy Temple
- Church
- Lourde Matha Church Syro Malabar Church
- St. George Malankara Syriac Catholic Church
- Sehion Mar Thoma Syrian Church, Varicadu
- Masjid - Paippad Puthanpalli Juma Masjid – A historic mosque, renovated in 2023, originally established in 1897

== Climate ==
Paippad has a Tropical monsoon climate. Average annual temperatures range from 22 °C to 34 °C, and rainfall averages 1,800–3,000 mm per year, concentrated in the monsoon season (June–September).

== Utilities and Services ==
- Electricity: Kerala State Electricity Board (KSEB)
- Water: Kerala Water Authority and Panchayat pipelines
- Telecommunications: 4G coverage by BSNL, Jio, Airtel, and Vi
- Banking: Branches of public and private sector banks are operational nearby
- Internet: Fiber/broadband provided by BSNL and private ISPs
- Public Services: Includes post office, village office, and co-operative societies

== Tourism ==
Paippad is connected to tourism attractions such as:

- Alappuzha backwaters (~40 km)
- Kumarakom (~40 km)
- Aranmula Parthasarathy Temple (~20 km)
- Sabarimala (via Chengannur, ~90 km)

== See also ==
- Changanassery
- Thiruvalla
- Chengannur
- Kochi
- Trivandrum
