= Vijayan K. Pillai =

Dr. Vijayan K. Pillai
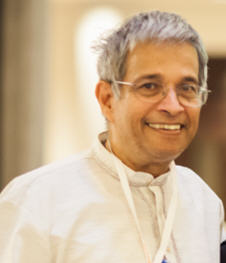
- Occupations: Professor, Social Work at the University of Texas at Arlington

Academic background
- Education: Ph.D., University of Iowa, MA, University of Indore, BS, University of Kerala

Academic work
- Discipline: Sociologist
- Institutions: University of Texas at Arlington

Vijayan Kumara Pillai, Ph.D. (born c. 1948), is a sociologist. He is a professor at the School of Social Work in the University of Texas at Arlington. He is an Honorary Adjunct Professor at Amrita University.

== Early life ==
He received his Ph.D. from the University of Iowa in 1983, with a thesis titled "Determinants of the first birth interval."

== Career ==
He taught at the University of North Texas, University of Iowa, and University of Zambia. He has published over 170 papers and book chapters, and co-authored or edited fourteen books. His research interests include the accessibility of health services in developing countries, women's rights and reproductive health, social development, sustainability, adolescent health and sexual behavior, acute malnutrition, and stunting. He is a referee to over fifty academic journals on sociology and related topics.

== Publications ==
=== Books ===
- Sunil, T. S., and Vijayan K. Pillai. Women's Reproductive Health in Yemen. Amherst, N.Y.: Cambria Press, 2010. ISBN 978-1-60497-662-5
- Review, Reference & Research Book News May 2010
- Littell, Julia H., Jacqueline Corcoran, and Vijayan K. Pillai. Systematic Reviews and Meta-Analysis. Oxford: Oxford University Press, 2008. ISBN 978-0-19-971686-9 Held in 384 libraries according to
  - Review, Research on Social Work Practice v. 18 no. 5 (Sept. 2008).
  - Review, Children & Youth Services Review v. 31 no. 4 (Apr. 2009).
- Crow, Thomas, and Vijayan K. Pillai. Designing a Teenage Pregnancy Prevention Program: The Behavioral Performance Theory. Lewiston, N.Y.: Edwin Mellen Press, 2006. ISBN 978-0-7734-5955-7
  - Review, SciTech Book News June 2006
- Weinstein, Jay A., and Vijayan K. Pillai. Demography: The Science of Population. Boston, Mass: Allyn and Bacon, 2001. ISBN 978-0-205-28321-7
- Achola, Paul Pius Waw, and Vijayan K. Pillai. Challenges of Primary Education in Developing Countries: Insights from Kenya. Aldershot: Ashgate, 2000. ISBN 978-1-84014-889-3
- Pillai, Vijayan K., Lyle W. Shannon, and Judith L. McKim., eds. Developing Areas: A Book of Readings and Research. Oxford: Berg, 1995. ISBN 978-1-85973-002-7
  - Review WorldViews: A Quarterly Review of Resources for Education and Action Jan 1996 v12 p6
- Pillai, Vijayan K., and Guang-zhen Wang. Women's Reproductive Rights in Developing Countries. Aldershot, Hants, England: Ashgate, 1999. ISBN 978-1-84014-908-1. In 316 libraries according to worldCat
  - Review Journal of Economic Literature Dec 1999 v37 i4 p1794
  - Review, Reference & Research Book News Nov 1999 v14 p109
  - Review, CHOICE: Current Reviews for Academic Libraries Oct 1999 v37 i2 p416(1)

== Selected journal articles ==
His most-cited peer-reviewed journal articles are:

- Pampel, Pillal, V.K. "Patterns and determinants of infant-mortality in developed nations, 1950-1975", Demography volume: 23 issue: 4 pages: 525-542 published: Nov 1986.
- Pei XM, Pillai VK, "Old age support in China: The role of the state and the family" International Journal of Aging and Development Volume: 49 Issue: 3 Pages: 197-212 Published: 1999
