= P. Bhaskaranunni =

Malayali historian (1924-1994)

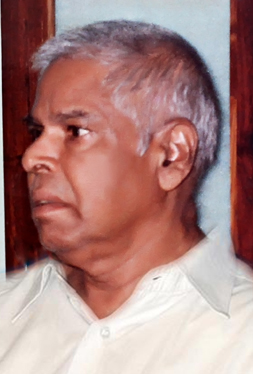
- Born: 17 December 1924; Kollam, India
- Died: 8 April 1994
- Occupations: Teacher, Historian, Critic
- Writing career
- Notable works: Pathompatham nootandile Keralam; Smartha Vicharam

P. Bhaskaranunni (17 Dec 1926 – 8 April 1994) was a historian and Malayalam literary critic. He received many awards from multiple different agencies of state and central governments.

== Life ==
Bhaskaranunni was born in Kaval Thankasseri, Kollam, to E. V. Parameswran and K. Karthyayani. Later he permanently resided at Eravipuram, Kollam. He was educated at St. Antony's school Vaddy, Mayyanad High School, Kollam Sanskrit School and Kollam SN College. He took on many different journalistic roles such as a Sub editor in the Janayugam Daily and Editorial Board member for the Samskarika daily of the Kerala Sahithya Academy. He was nominated as a member to the Kerala state archives. He was a Library council activist and worked in many other social, Political and cultural fields.

He was a teacher at Mayyanad High school.

== Writing ==
- Pathompatham Nootandile Keralam – Kerala Sahithya Academy
- Keralam-Erupatham Nootandinte Aarambhathil – Kerala Sahithya Academy
- Velicham Veesunnu – National Press, Kollam
- Smarthavicharam – NBS
- Kausthoobham – NBS
- Antharjanam muthal Madhavikkutti vare – NBS
- Aasante Vicharasaili – NBS
- Pattiniyum Avarodhavum – Kerala State Institute of Language
- Sahithyathile Neriyum Nerikedum – Prabhath Book House
- Vallatholinte Kavitha – Prabhath Book House
- Kuttikalude Budhadevan – Mathrubhumi Books
- Ayyappante Kavyasilpan – Indian Atheist Publishers
- Kollathinte Charithram – Kollam Public Library
- Keralam Mukhaprasamgangaliloode – Kerala Press Academi

== Awards and honours ==
- Fellowship from Human resources ministry
- Kerala History Association Award
- Kerala Press Academy Scholarship
