= Kollam Babu =

Indian artist (1941–2021)

Mukundan Pillai
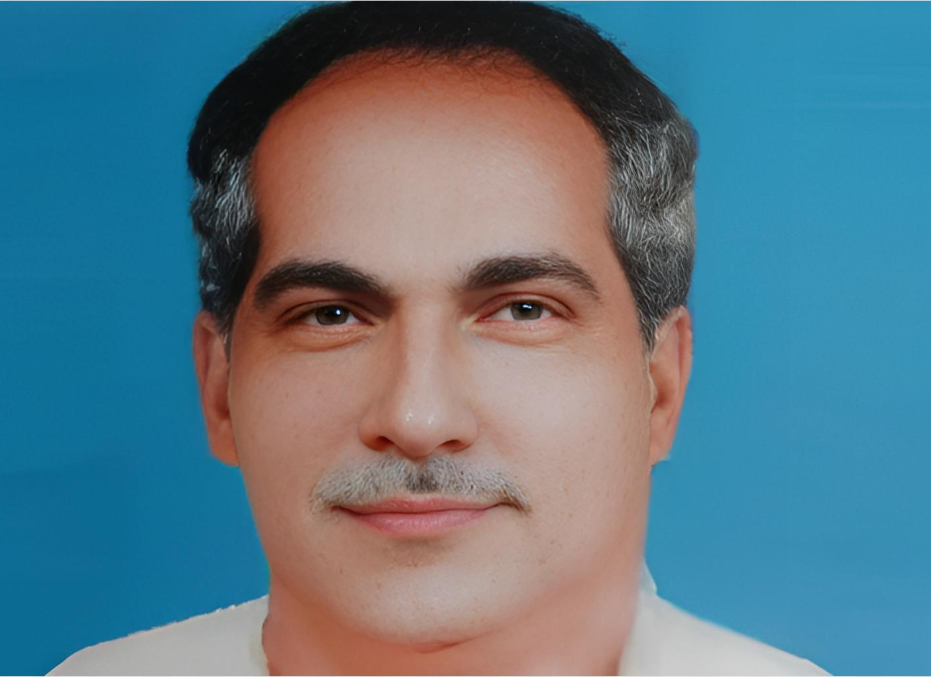
- Born: Mukundan Pillai; 1941; Kollam, Travancore
- Died: 12 September 2021; Kollam, Kerala, India
- Occupation: Drama artist
- Years active: 1959

Kollam Babu (1941 – 12 September 2021), born as Mukundan Pillai, was a well-known Kadhaprasangam artist in Kerala, India. He performed Kadhaprasangam at more than 15,000 venues.

== Early life ==
Mukundan Pillai was born into a Travancore-based Nair family in Kollam district, Kerala. He has a brother, Gopinathan Nair, who is a singer. He completed his education up to class 10. He debuted as a theatre performer at the age of 13, playing a 60-year-old character.

== Career ==
Initially he worked as a government employee in Kollam, Kerala later he exit that job for a full time drama artist. He present all Type of Indian language poems as Kadhaprasangam with his official drama troupe, "Kollam Yavana." He presented more than 35 stories in more 1000 stages in Kerala. 3 January 1959 his debut in Kadhaprasangam, his Kadhaprasangam career is until 1990s (35 years).

== Awards ==
Recipient of numerous honors, including the Kerala Sangeetha Nataka Akademi Award, he performed on thousands of stages. Kollam Babu was well-known in theatre circles, having started his career on the stage.

== Death ==
He died on Sunday, 12 September 2021, in Kollam, Kerala, due to an age-related ailment.
