= Samuel (cartoonist) =

Thomas Samuel (1925–2012), a.k.a. T. Samuel or Samuval, was a cartoonist from Kerala who published under the name 'Samuel'. He is considered to be the father of box or pocket cartoons in India.

== Early life ==
Samuel was born in Kollam on 25 January 1925 (1926 according to some sources). Comics researcher Ritu Gairola Khanduri writes that he was a graduate of Lahore’s Mayo School of Industrial Arts (now National College of Arts).

== Career ==
After the War he worked in Lahore as a portrait painter. His first stint as cartoonist was in Lahore at the Civil & Military Gazette. Following the Partition of India in 1947, he came to Delhi where he joined Shankar's Weekly contributing the silent strip cartoon Kalu and Meena and other social cartoons. This early strip was about two children of refugees from Lahore.

After four years, he left to join the Delhi edition of The Times of India as staff cartoonist, creating the country's first pocket cartoon, 'This is Delhi' in 1953. It even found a post-Partition readership across the border, and the Pakistani papers ran it as 'This is Lahore'. The pocket cartoon was later renamed "Babuji" after its main character and became popular under that name. The strip was appreciated primarily because it echoed the thoughts of the middle class Indian. According to Ritu Gairola Khanduri, "Although Laxman’s "You Said It" pocket cartoon series and his common man character caught the public imagination, more credit than has been accorded, is due to Samuel and "Babuji". "Babuji" inaugurated the concept of the common man — an office clerk, and his travails in India’s pocket cartoon-world. Bibiji was pictured too. Samuel spent time living in a clerk’s home to observe the humdrum he was to caricature".

With editor Frank Moraes, Samuel went to the Indian Express in 1957 where he continued "Babuji" and also contributed the cartoon strip "Garib" besides regular political cartoons. He worked at the Express till 1961. His final stint was at The Times of India and the NavBharat Times where he remained till his retirement in 1985. He contributed a strip to the Times of India's Hindi magazine Dharmyug in the fifties, which was a precursor to later strips like Abid Surti's 'Dabbuji'.

At the Times Samuel shared the same workspace as cartoonist Sudhir Tailang. His works were shown at the Kollam Press Club which honoured him for his pioneering contribution.

== Other work ==
Samuel also drew cartoons and sketches for public service campaigns, notably for W.H.O and commissions for Indian Airlines, the Railway Board, the Indian Standards Institution etc.

== Books ==
- Samuel, T. (1971). Babuji: 100 selected cartoons. Delhi: Hind Pocket Books.
- Samuel, T. (1979?). Babuji's thoughts. Delhi: MBS Publishers. Reviewed in Indian and Foreign Review, which quotes Samuel's dedication of the book to the 'endearing community of secretariat clerks whose thoughts remain close to my heart'.
- Samuel, T. (?) The Best of Garib
- Samuel, T. (2009) Never a Dull Moment Allahabad: Genesis Publishing.
