= N. P. Nayar =

Freedom fighter and author

N. Parameswaran Nayar
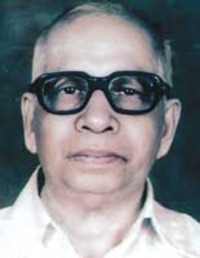
- Born: N. Parameswaran Nayar; 10 December 1913; Kollam, Kerala, india
- Died: 23 January 2011 (aged 97)
- Parent(s): S. Narayana Pillai; Devi Nangeli Amma

N. Parameswaran Nayar, popularly known as N. P. Nayar (10 December 1913 – 23 January 2011) was an Indian freedom fighter and author from Kollam.

== Early life ==
Nayar was born to S. Narayana Pillai and Devi Nangeli Amma on 10 December 1913 at Kollam. He completed his schooling from Anchalummood Public School and Kollam Boys High School. After his Intermediate studies, he took B.A. in Chemistry in 1934 from Travancore Science College. He started his career as a chemist in agricultural research in Malaya.

== Freedom movement ==
In 1943, Nayar resigned his job and joined Netaji Subhas Chandra Bose's Azad Hind Dal as civil administrator. He served as Superintendent of Stocks at Jayawadi complex during April–June, 1944 while Operation U was on. He was then transferred to Mawlamyine in Lower Burma. He was arrested by the British later and was sent to jail. In June 1946, he was released from jail.

== Later life ==
Nayar joined the agriculture department of Madras Presidency as an agriculture research analyst in 1946 and worked there till 1950. Thereafter, he returned to Kollam at the request of Mannathu Padmanabhan and worked as a teacher in NSS schools, before retiring as headmaster from NSS High School for Boys, Pandalam in 1974.

In 1992, Nayar founded the non-profit organisation Netaji Smarak Nidhi in Kollam. He was a member of Kerala Ex-INA Association and Kerala Freedom Fighters' Association.

Nayar was paralysed in 2010 and died in 2011. He was married to Bhargavi Amma and had two sons and two daughters.

== Author ==
Nayar wrote several books on the freedom movement and the life and times of Bose, and also on the disappearance mystery of Bose. He authored the books Jallianwalla Durantham, Quit India Samaram, Netaji Subhas Chandra Bose, Operation Blue Star, Subhasinte Sahasika Yathrakal, Netajiyude Rashtra Sevanangal, Netaji Evite, and 1946-le Indian Navika Lahala. He also wrote a translation INA-yum Netaji-yum and a travelogue Andamaniloode. For the Kerala education department, he wrote the books Sphotakavasthukkal and Railway – Innale, Innu, Naale.

== See also ==
- List of persons from Kerala
