= Job Maichil =

Indian politician

Job Michael

Member of Kerala Legislative Assembly
- In office 2021–2026
- Constituency: Changancherry

Personal details
- Party: Kerala Congress (M)
- Spouse: Jijy

Job Michael is an Indian politician who served as a member of the Kerala Legislative Assembly, representing Changanacherry assembly constituency. He won the 2021 assembly elections.
