= P. K. Raghavan =

Indian politician

Personal details
- Born: 23 April 1934
- Died: 19 August 2005 (aged 71)
- Party: Communist Party of India
- Spouse: Saraswathi

P. K. Raghavan (23 April 1934 – 19 August 2005) was an Indian politician and former Minister of Kerala State. He came to active politics through the Student movement of the Communist Party of India.

== Political life ==
He became a member of the Communist Party of India in 1953. In 1967 and 1970 he was elected to the Kerala Legislative Assembly from Pathanapuram constituency. He was Minister for a short term in the C. Achutha Menon Ministry in 1970 and held the portfolios of Harijan Welfare.

In 1987, he represented Vaikom constituency and was Minister for Harijan Welfare in the E. K. Nayanar Ministry from 1987 to 1991. He was the State Executive Member of the Communist Party of India in Kerala and also the General Secretary of the Kerala Pulayar Mahasabha.

He is survived by his wife Smt. Saraswathi. He has three children; his son R. S. Anil contested to the Lok Sabha in the General Elections of 2009 from Adoor constituency but was defeated.
