= Kerala Congress (B) =

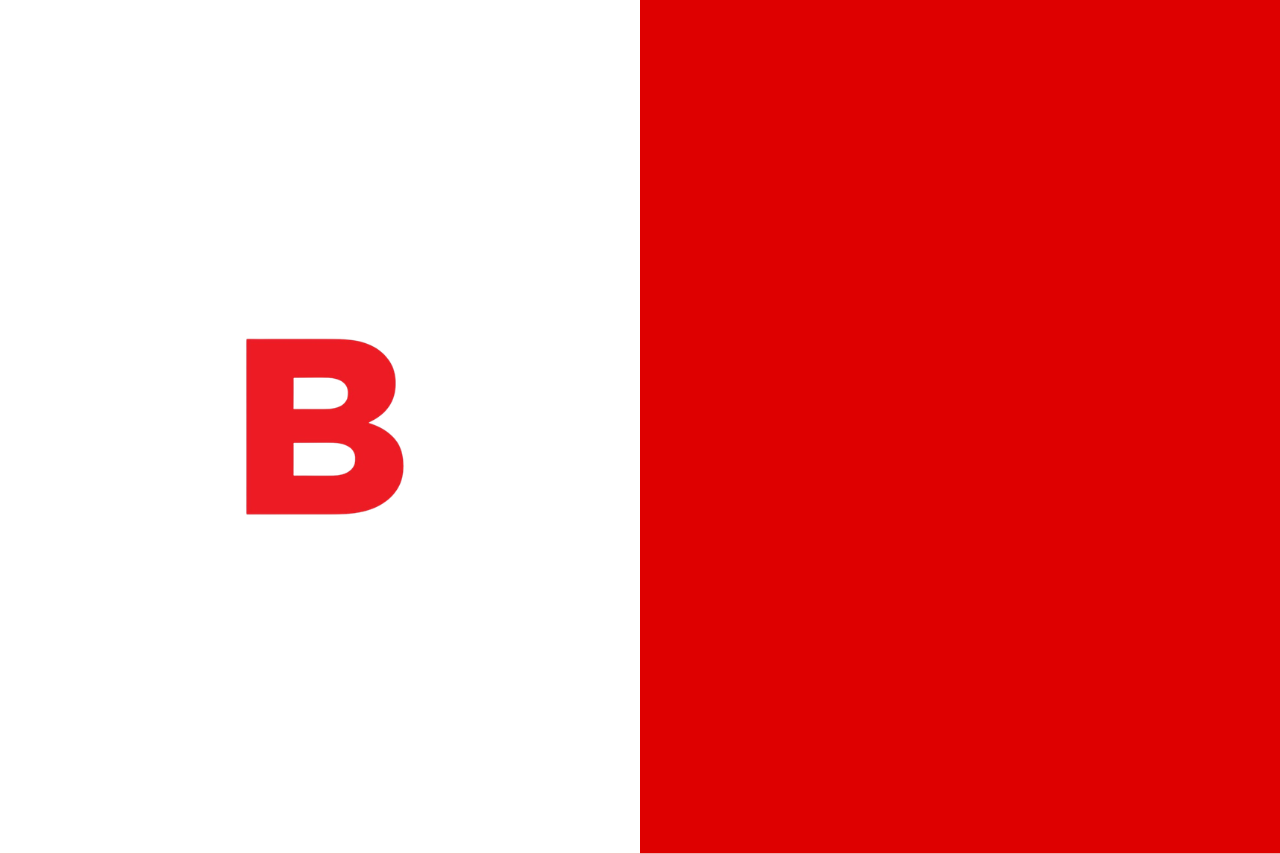
- Abbreviation: KC (B)
- Chairperson: K. B. Ganesh Kumar (official); Usha Mohandas (splinter group)
- Founder: R. Balakrishna Pillai
- Founded: 1977; 49 years ago
- Split from: Kerala Congress
- Headquarters: P. T. Chacko Smaraka Mandiram, S. S. Kovil Road, Thampanoor, Thiruvananthapuram-695001, Kerala
- Ideology: Democratic socialism
- Political position: Left-wing
- Colours: White and Red
- ECI status: Registered-Unrecognized
- Alliance: LDF (1977 – 1982) (2015 – present); UDF (1982–2014); Independent (2014–2015)
- Seats in Kerala Legislative Assembly: 0 / 140
- Number of states and union territories in government: 0 / 31

Kerala Congress (B) (Abbr. KC(B)) is a registered political party in Kerala, formed by R. Balakrishna Pillai, a former minister of the government of Kerala. At present, the party does not have an MLA in the state Legislative Assembly. The KC(B) is the part of Left Democratic Front (LDF).

== History ==
The party was formed in 1977, following the split in Kerala Congress that occurred after the death of K. M. George due to differences that arose between K. M. Mani and R. Balakrishna Pillai. The party was a constituent of LDF on formation. Later it moved to UDF and became a part of the Third Karunakaran ministry. The party chief R. Balakrishna Pillai was the minister of Transport in that ministry. During this period Pillai's home turf Kottarakkara got developed as a major KSRTC hub of the state.

In 1985, the Mani, Joseph and Pillai led KC(B) merged to form Kerala Congress. In 1987, Mani broke away from this merger and left the coalition government. However Pillai stayed with Joseph till 1989 and the KC(B) was revived again in 1989. In 1995, Joseph M. Puthussery faction split and parted ways with Kerala Congress (B).

In 2015, KC (B) joined LDF by leaving the UDF.

On 3 May 2021, R. Balakrishna Pillai dies due to age-related ailments. From 2017 onwards, he had been serving as the chairman of the Kerala State Welfare Corporation for Forward Communities, with cabinet rank. After Pillai's death, the State committee elected K. B. Ganesh Kumar as party chairman on 10 May 2021.

== Performance in elections ==
The party chief, R. Balakrishna Pillai was elected to the Lok Sabha in 1971 and the State Assembly nine times since 1960 (1965, 1977, 1980, 1982, 1987, 1991,1996, 2001). However, in the 2006 election he was defeated by a little-known opponent belonging to the CPIM.

His son Ganesh Kumar, a Malayalam film and television actor, made his electoral debut in 2001, when he was elected from Pathanapuram (State Assembly constituency). It was the election that the KC(B) reached its highest tally of 2 members in the Kerala Legislative Assembly. Ganesh went on to become Transport Minister in the Third Antony ministry. In a brief period of 2 years as minister he earned wide popularity for giving face-lift to the loss making KSRTC. In 2003 Ganesh resigned and Pillai became the minister. Ganesh is currently the Acting Chairman of the Kerala Congress (B).

Ganesh won the 2011 Kerala Legislative Assembly election and was the Minister for Forest, Sports, and Cinema in the second Oommen Chandy Ministry from 2011 to 2013. He had to resign following complaints from his wife regarding domestic violence. The Party fielded two candidates in the 2011 election to the Kerala Assembly. N. N. Murali, a well known surgeon, is the party's candidate from Kottarakkara. Ganesh Kumar achieved a hat-trick win from the Pathanapuram constituency. But Murali was defeated by his relative and LDF candidate P. Aisha Potty and only Ganesh Kumar could become MLA.

In 2015, the party left UDF and joined LDF. Ganesh Kumar again contested from Pathanapuram in the 2016 Kerala Legislative Assembly election, and won for a fourth consecutive time, this time defeating another famous film actor Jagadish by a huge margin. Pathanapuram constituency got statewide attention in those elections as the three major contestants from the constituency were all film actors – Ganesh Kumar, Jagadish and Bheeman Raghu.

In the 2021 Kerala Legislative Assembly election, the party is contesting from only one seat under the LDF, in the Pathanapuram (State Assembly constituency) with Ganesh Kumar as the candidate.

Kerala Legislative Assembly election results
Election Year	Alliance	Seats contested	Seats won	Total Votes	Percentage of votes	± Vote
2026	LDF	1	0 / 140	59,965	0.28%	▼
2021	LDF	1	1 / 140	67,276	0.32%	▼0.05%
2016	LDF	1	1 / 140	74,429	0.37%	▼0.35%
2011	UDF	2	1 / 140	124,898	0.72%	▼0.10%
2006	UDF	2	1 / 140	95,710	0.62%	▼0.10%
2001	UDF	2	2 / 140	113,915	0.72%	▲0.08%
1996	UDF	2	1 / 140	91,968	0.64%	▲0.31%
1991	UDF	1	1 / 140	47,122	0.33%	▼0.47%
1980	LDF	2	1 / 140	76,758	0.80%	▼3.73%
1977	LDF	15	2 / 140	397,814	4.53%	New

== See also ==
- List of political parties in India
