= Believers Church Medical College Hospital =

- Believers Eastern Church
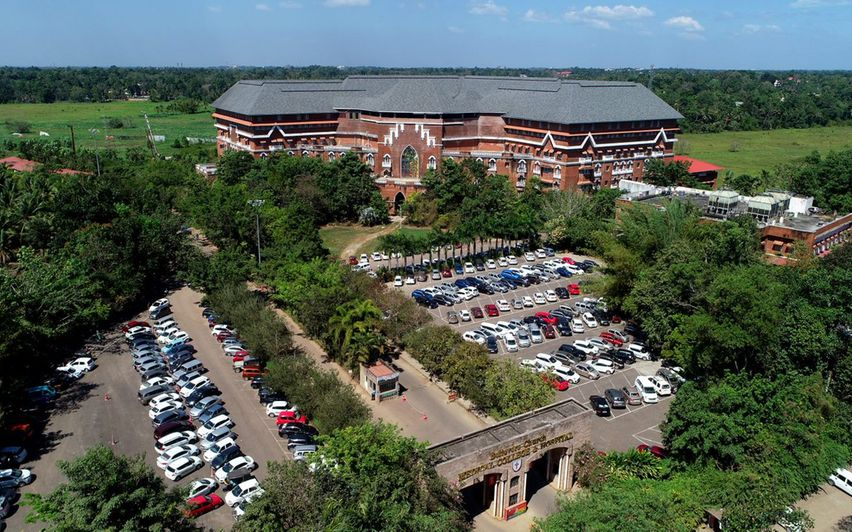

Geography
- Location: St. Thomas Nagar, Kuttapuzha, Thiruvalla, Kerala, India
- Coordinates: 9.4167481°N 76.5750611°E

Organisation
- Care system: Private
- Type: Teaching
- Affiliated university: Kerala University of Health Sciences
- Patron: Moran Mor Athanasius Yohan Metropolitan
- Network: Believers Church Health Care Institutions

Services
- Emergency department: Yes
- Beds: 745

History
- Opened: 2014

Links
- Website: www.bcmch.org
- Lists: Hospitals in India

Believers Church Medical College Hospital (BCMCH) is a healthcare institution of Believers eastern Church based in Thiruvalla, Kerala, India. The Medical College is attached to a 750-bed, multi-speciality hospital. The Medical College, established in 2016, and is situated in a campus of about 25 acres (10 ha). The BCMCH is affiliated to the Kerala University of Health Sciences (KUHS)
