= K. B. Ganesh Kumar =

Indian actor and politician (born 1966)

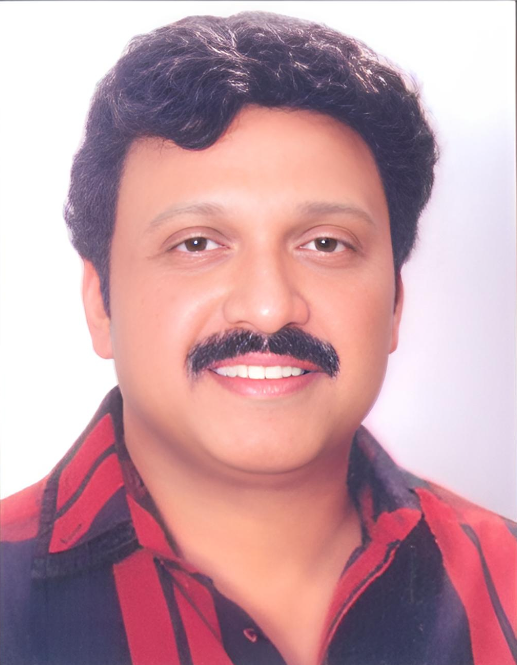
- Kumar in 2018

Minister of Transport, Government of Kerala
- In office 29 December 2023 – 23 May 2026
- Governor: Arif Mohammad Khan; Rajendra Vishwanath Arlekar
- Chief Minister: Pinarayi Vijayan
- Portfolios: Transport Department; Motor Vehicles; Water Transport; KSRTC
- Preceded by: Antony Raju
- Succeeded by: C. P. John
- In office 17 May 2001 – 2003
- Preceded by: C. K. Nanu
- Succeeded by: N. Sakthan

Chairman of Kerala Congress (B)
- Incumbent
- Assumed office 10 May 2021
- Preceded by: R. Balakrishna Pillai

Member of the Kerala Legislative Assembly
- In office 13 May 2001 – 23 May 2026
- Preceded by: K. Prekash Babu
- Succeeded by: Jyothi Kumar Chamakkala
- Constituency: Pathanapuram

Minister of Forests & Environment, Sports and Cinema, Government of Kerala
- In office 23 May 2011 – 1 April 2013
- Preceded by: Binoy Viswam
- Succeeded by: Thiruvanchoor Radhakrishnan

President of Nair Service Society, Pathanapuram Taluk Union
- In office 27 December 2021 – 14 March 2026
- Preceded by: R. Balakrishna Pillai
- Succeeded by: K. Thankappan Pillai (as the Chairman of the interim ad hoc committee)

Personal details
- Born: 25 May 1966 (age 60) Kollam, Kerala, India
- Party: Kerala Congress (B) (UDF: 2001–2014) (Independent 2014-2015) (LDF: 2015–present)
- Spouses: Dr. Yamini Thankachy (m. 1994; div. 2013); Bindhu Menon (m. 2014)
- Children: 2
- Parents: R. Balakrishna Pillai; Valsala Kumari
- Occupation: Actor; television presenter; television host; politician
- Website: kbganeshkumar.net

Keezhoote Balakrishna Ganesh Kumar (born 25 May 1966), known as K. B. Ganesh Kumar, is an Indian politician, actor and television host. He served as the Minister for Transport in the Government of Kerala in the Kerala Congress from 2001 to 2003 and again from December 2023 to May 2026 in the Communist Party of India (Marxist). He also served as the Minister for Forests, Environment, Sports and Cinema from 2011 to 2013. He was a member of the Kerala Legislative Assembly representing the Pathanapuram Assembly constituency from 2001 to 2026. He made his debut as an actor in the film Irakal (1985) directed by K. G. George. He has starred in over 100 Malayalam films, performing a variety of roles.

He was the Minister for Forests & Environment, Sports and Cinema in the Government of Kerala beginning May 2011 until his resignation on 1 April 2013. He was elected from Pathanapuram in 2001 and has represented the constituency till the year 2026. He was Transport Minister from May 2001 to March 2003. He is the son of R. Balakrishna Pillai, former Minister of Kerala. In 2023, the Nair Service Society appointed Ganesh Kumar in the NSS Board of Directors, replacing Kalanjoor Madhu, the elder brother of K. N. Balagopal, the Minister for Finance, Government of Kerala. In March 2026, the NSS Pathanapuram Taluk Union governing body, which Ganesh Kumar presided over, was dissolved by the Karayogam Registrar after 11 of its 19 members resigned. The mass resignation was triggered by allegations of financial irregularities regarding a ₹4 crore building construction project in Punalur, alongside accusations of an authoritarian administrative style. Consequently, an ad-hoc committee was appointed to run the union. The internal mutiny culminated in June 2026 when the NSS leadership chose not to reappoint Ganesh Kumar to the Board of Directors upon the expiration of his term. While the terms of the other eight sitting directors were renewed, Ganesh Kumar was explicitly replaced by B.R.K. Babu, a move he publicly criticized as undemocratic.

== Political career ==
In May 2001, Ganesh Kumar was elected to the Kerala Assembly from Pathanapuram on a Kerala Congress (B) ticket. He defeated K. Prakash Babu, by a margin of 9,931 votes. Ganesh Kumar's father and former Minister, R. Balakrishna Pillai had been elected from the neighbouring constituency of Kottarakara, which he had represented for several decades.

Ganesh Kumar became Transport Minister in the Antony cabinet in May 2001 and went on to give a good account of himself. Though a political novice at that time, he turned around the ailing KSRTC and earned a reputation for providing a clean and efficient administration. In March 2003, he stepped down from his ministerial post to facilitate his father's induction into the Cabinet.

In the 2006 Assembly elections, Ganesh Kumar was once again elected from Pathanapuram, this time realising an increased victory margin of 11,814 votes by defeating K. R. Chandramohanan of CPI. LDF had made a clean sweep, winning 11 out of 12 seats in Kollam District and a formidable majority in the State Assembly, thereby making Ganesh Kumar the only UDF MLA from Kollam district. The election also saw the defeat of many of his former ministerial colleagues, including M. K. Muneer, P. K. Kunhalikutty, Babu Divakaran and Ganesh Kumar's father Balakrishna Pillai.

In the 2011 Assembly elections, Ganesh Kumar scored a hat-trick win from Pathanapuram with an even bigger margin of 20,402 votes, trouncing his veteran CPM rival, K. Rajagopal. He went on to become a Minister for Forests, Sports and Cinema in the Oommen Chandy cabinet in May 2011. He resigned from cabinet due to the domestic violence case filed by his wife Yamini Thankachi on 7 April 2013.

In the 2016 Assembly elections, Ganesh Kumar become an LDF candidate and defeated Jagadish of Indian National Congress by a margin of 24,562 votes.

In the 2021 Assembly elections, Ganesh Kumar become an LDF candidate and defeated Jyothi Kumar Chamakkala of Indian National Congress by a margin of 14,674 votes.

However, in the 2026 Assembly elections, Ganesh Kumar contested as LDF candidate lost for the first time in the Pathanapuram constituency, Jyothi Kumar Chamakkala of the Indian National Congress defeated him by a margin of 8,310 votes.

== Personal life ==
Ganesh was born as the son of former minister R. Balakrishna Pillai and Valsala Kumari in Kollam, Kerala on 25 May 1966. He was an alumnus of Government Arts College, Thiruvananthapuram.

On 20 May 1994, he married Dr. Yamini Thankachy, who worked as a senior research fellow at the Achutha Menon Centre for Health Science Studies while pursuing her Ph.D. in Adolescent health. The couple have two sons, Adithyan and Devaraman. The couple later divorced due to irreconcilable differences due to Kumar's infidelity and domestic violence. Ganesh married Bindhu Menon on 24 January 2014 who works as marketing head in Asianet.

== Film career ==
Ganesh Kumar made his debut in the 1985 Malayalam film Irakal directed by K. G. George. The film was adjudged the second best film for the year. Over the years he made his a mark on the silver screen as a supporting actor, performing a variety of roles during the last two decades. Since 2001 he has balanced his role as MLA with his acting duties.

Ganesh Kumar's early films saw him frequently donning the role of villain or anti-social, as portrayed in Cheppu (1987) and Rakuyilin Ragasadassil. The film Lion (2005), starring Dileep and Kavya Madhavan was loosely based on Ganesh Kumar's life. The movie fared well at the box office.

In March 2008, Ganesh Kumar was chosen by the Frame Media Gallup poll to receive the best actor award for his role in the Amrita TV serial Aliyanmarum Penganmarum. He went on to win the State Award for Best Television Actor (2007) for his role in the serial Madhavam, aired on Surya TV.

== Controversy ==
Fenny Balakrishnan, the former lawyer and counsel for Saritha S Nair, the prime accused in the 2013 solar scam, had raised serious allegations against Ganesh Kumar, saying that Ganesh Kumar added four pages to Saritha S. Nair's letter, bringing the total number of pages to 25.

In 2018, he allegedly assaulted a youth in a road rage incident, with the youth ending up in a hospital for injury treatment. Later that year he allegedly manhandled a school headmaster in a school event, facing charges.

== Filmography ==
Year	Film	Role	Notes
1985	Irakal	Baby	
1986	Sukhamo Devi	Chandran	
1986	Yuvajanotsavam	Rajeevan	
1987	Cheppu	Ranjith	
1987	Kadhakku Pinnil	Mohanan	
1987	Bhoomiyile Rajakkanmar	Raju	
1987	Sarvakalashala	Panchara	
1987	Oru Vivada Vishayam	Unni	
1988	Kakkothikkavile Appooppan Thaadikal		
1988	Oru Muthassi Katha	Unnikrishnan	
1988	Chithram	Lissy's Brother	
1988	Janmandharam	Murali	
1988	Dhinarathrangal	Chekutty	
1988	Mrithyunjayam	Robin	
1988	Sangham	Anil	
1988	Mukthi	Vinod	
1988	Manasa Maine Varu	Raju	
1989	Puthiya Karukkal	Suresh	
1989	Devadas	Rajashekharan Thampi	
1989	Vandanam	Raghu	
1989	Adharvam	Vishnu	
1989	Jagratha	Kumar	
1989	Nair Saab	Cadet Ganeshan	
1989	Eenam Thettatha Kattaru	Rajesh	
1990	Randam Varavu	Tomy	
1990	Gajakesariyogam	Vasu	
1990	Aye Auto	Suresh	
1990	Veena Meettiya Vilangukal		
1990	Malayogam	Georgekutty	
1990	Kottayam Kunjachan	Mathan	
1990	Ponnaranjanam	Gilbert	
1991	Parallel College	Vikraman	
1991	Abhimanyu	Gopalakrishnan	
1991	Kakkathollayiram	Balakrishnan	
1991	Njan Gandharvan	Pradeep	
1991	Kuttapathram	Peter	
1991	Apoorvam Chilar	Benny	
1991	Kilukkam	Justice Pillai's son	
1991	Nayam Vyakthamakkunnu	Journalist	
1992	Aardram	Abu	
1992	Manyanmaar	Vikraman's third son	
1992	Kaazhchakkppuram	Vijayan	
1992	Kasargod Khader Bhai		
1992	Ootty Pattanam	Rama Varma	
1992	Kizhakkan Pathrose	James	
1992	Neelakurukkan	Nassar	
1992	Mahanagaram	Raju	
1993	Ammayane Sathyam	Cherian	
1993	Mafia	Murukan	
1993	Janam	Mahesh	
1993	Customs Diary	Jamal	
1993	Manichithrathazhu	Dasappan Kutty	
1993	Sthalathe Pradhana Payyans	Prasannan	
1993	Ekalavyan	Unni Joseph Mulaveedan	
1994	Gamanam	Bhasi	
1994	Pakshe	Nandini's brother	
1994	Nandini Oppol	Anil	
1994	Commissioner	Prasad	
1994	Rudraksham	Surendra Reddy	
1995	Vishnu	Chandramohan	
1995	Agrajan	Anto Joseph	
1995	The King	Prasad	
1996	Samoohyapadom		
1996	Mahatma The Great		
1996	Aayiram Naavulla Ananthan	Raju	
1997	Asuravamsam	Dr. Mohan	
1997	Kalyanappittannu		
1997	Guru		
1997	Aaram Thamburan	Ashok Kumar	
1997	Varnapakittu	Tonichen	
1998	The Truth	SIT Team Member	
1999	Ustaad	Sethu	
1999	F.I.R	Roy Alex	
1999	Crime File	Raju Namasivaya	
1999	Aayiram Meni	Lalichan	
1999	Olympian Antony Adam	ASP Nasser IPS	
2000	Susanna	Johny	
2000	Dada Sahib	Das	
2000	Pilots	Vinayachandran	
2003	Kilichundan Mampazham	Umar	
2004	Vismayathumbathu	Medical College Professor	
2006	Photographer	Ananthan	
2007	Hallo	Sudheesh Nambiar	
2007	Ali Bhai	Therandi Ramu	
2008	Veruthe Oru Bharya	Doctor	
2009	Sagar Alias Jacky Reloaded	Hari	
2009	Keralotsavam		
2009	Kadha, Samvidhanam Kunchakko	SP Manoj Pothan	
2009	Rahasya Police	Parampathu Raju	
2009	Vellathooval	City Police Commissioner Aby	
2009	Swantham Lekhakan	Vishnu	
2009	Red Chillies	Inspector Upendra Verma	
2009	Ivar Vivahitharayal	Jeevan	
2010	Janakan	ACP Rajeev Kumar	
2010	Alexander the Great	Ravi Varma	
2010	Kaaryasthan	CI Sabarinathan	
2010	Four Friends	Dr. Nandhagopal	
2011	Nakharam		
2011	Priyappetta Nattukare		
2012	My Boss	Tom George	
2012	Spirit	Ashraf	
2013	Up & Down: Mukalil Oralundu	Siyad Ahemmed	
2013	Ladies and Gentleman	Shivashankara Menon	
2014	Avatharam	Sudhakaran	
2014	Mizhi Thurakku		
2014	Villali Veeran	Pavithran	
2016	Hallelooya	Father Francis	
2018	Mandharam	Rajesh's father	
2019	Kodathi Samaksham Balan Vakeel	Vincent Thomas	
2019	Mera Naam Shaji	Dominic George	
2021	Saajan Bakery Since 1962	Cheriyan	
2021	Drishyam 2	CI Philip Mathew	
2021	Marakkar: Arabikadalinte Simham	Verkkottu Panicker	
2022	Aaraattu	SP Joseph Cherian	
2022	Monster	SP Joseph Cherian IPS	
2023	Neru	CI Paul Varghese	
2024	Gaganachari	Major Victor Vasudevan	
2026	Drishyam 3	DySP Philip Mathew	
2026	Thudakkam		

== Television ==
- Ammayi (Doordarshan)
- Dr. Harischadra (Doordarshan)
- Samayam (Asianet)
- Gandharva Yamam (Asianet)
- Sindhooram (Asianet)
- Radhamadhavam (Surya TV)
- Mohangal (Doordarshan)
- Oru Kudayum Kunjipengalum (Doordarshan)
- Melappadam (Doordarshan)
- Jwalayayi (Doordarshan)
- Madhavam (Surya TV)
- Megham (Asianet)
- Vikramadithyan (Asianet)
- Ammathottil (Asianet)
- Aliyanmarum Penganmarum (Amrita TV)
- Mandaram (Kairali TV)
- Bhamini Tholkkarilla (Asianet)
- Jagratha (Amrita TV)
- Kalyani (Mazhavil Manorama)

=== TV shows as Host ===
- Nammal Thammil (Asianet)

== Awards ==
=== Kerala State Television Awards ===
- 2007: Kerala State Television Award for Best Actor in a Lead role - Male - Madhavam
