= Kalidasa Kalakendram =

Indian theatrical group

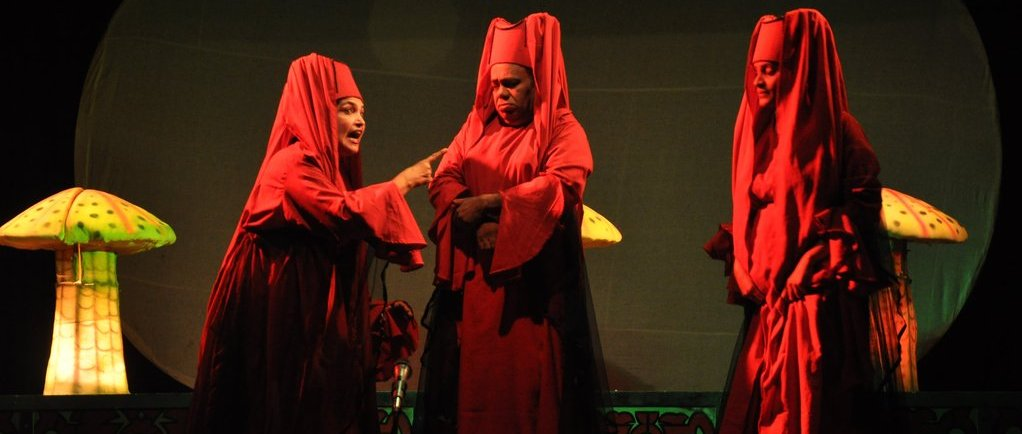
- A scene from Macbeth by Kalidasa Kalakendram
- Formation: 25 January 1963
- Type: Theatre group
- Location: Pattathanam, Kollam
- Members: O. Madhavan - Founder; Vijayakumari - Secretary; Mukesh - Promoter
- Artistic director: E. A. Rajendran

Kalidasa Kalakendram is a professional drama theatrical group founded by O. Madhavan, a well-known Malayalam theatre director, in Kollam, Kerala. The group was founded on 25 January 1963 as a society under the parent organisation, Paul Foundation.

== History ==
The city of Kollam in Kerala is well known for its affinity to drama and drama theaters. There were more than 450 drama troupes in Kollam in the past. Kalidasa Kalakendram is one among them, founded by thespian O. Madhavan on 25 January 1963 with the support of O. N. V. Kurup, Vaikom Chandrasekharan Nair and Devarajan Master. Now the troupe is managed by Sandhya Rajendran(daughter of O. Madhavan), E. A. Rajendran(son-in-law of O. Madhavan), Actor Mukesh(son of O. Madhavan), Jayasree Syamlal(daughter of O. Madhavan) and Syamlal(son-in-law of O. Madhavan).

== Famous plays by Kalidasa Kalakendram ==
- Aagamam
- Chakravarthy
- Chakravyooham
- Circus
- Deepthi
- Doctor
- Hamsageetham
- Janani Janmabhoomi
- Kaakkapponnu
- Kadalpalam
- Kadannalkoodu
- Karuna
- Kuttavum Sikshayum
- Macbeth
- Muthuchippi
- Pravaham
- Rainbow
- Rakthanakshathram
- Rashtrabhavan
- Sangamam
- Sankhumudra
- Simhanaadam
- Swantham Lekhakan
- Thanneer Panthal
- Theeram
- Thuramukham
- Yamuna
- Yudhabhoomi
- Vilambaram

== Movies ==
In 2012, Kalidasa Kalakendram ventured into film production through the Malayalam movie Hide N' Seek, directed by Anil. Divyadarshan, the grandson of O. Madhavan, played the lead role in the movie. The movie production house of Kalidasa Kalakendram was named as Kalidasa International Movies.

== Gallery ==
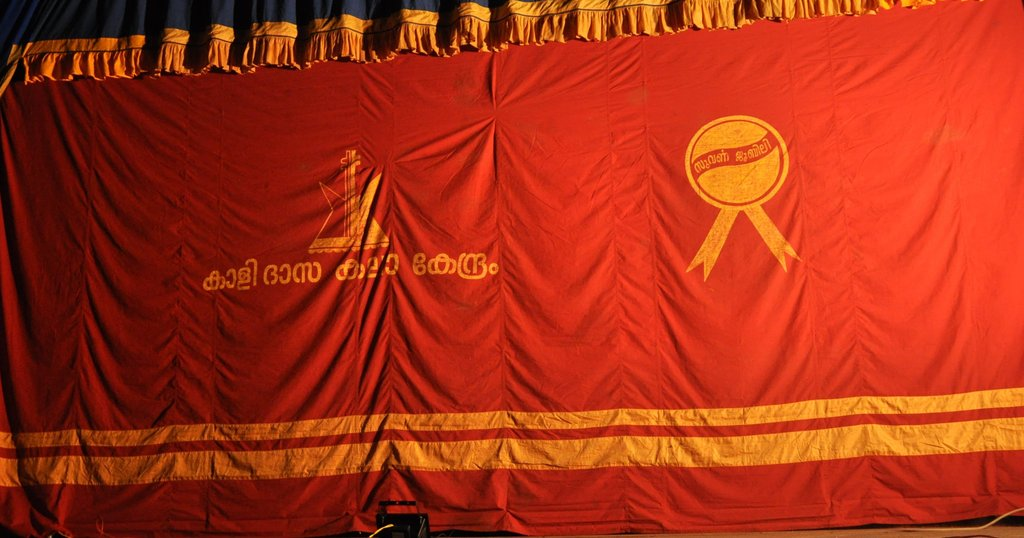
Curtain raising - Kalidasa Kalakendram

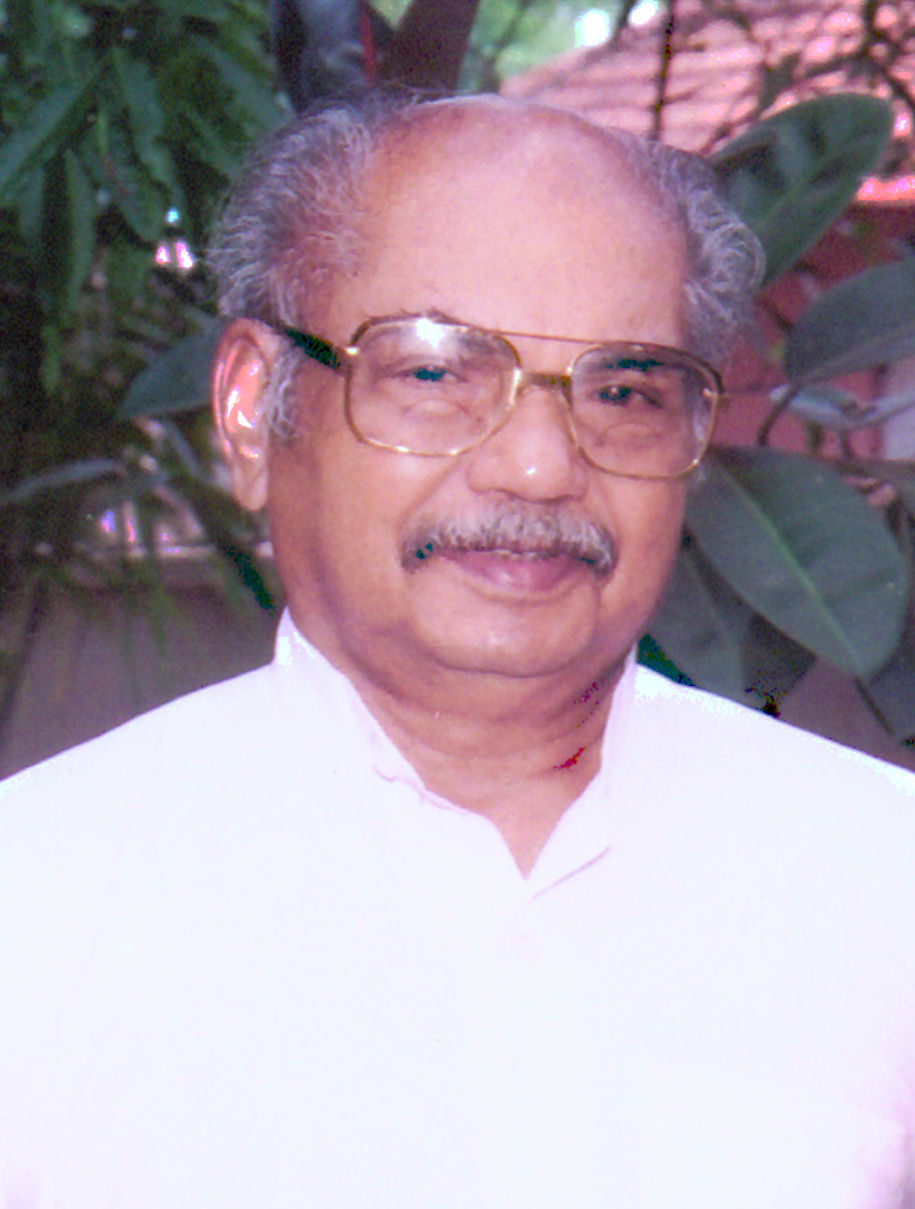
Founder - O. Madhavan

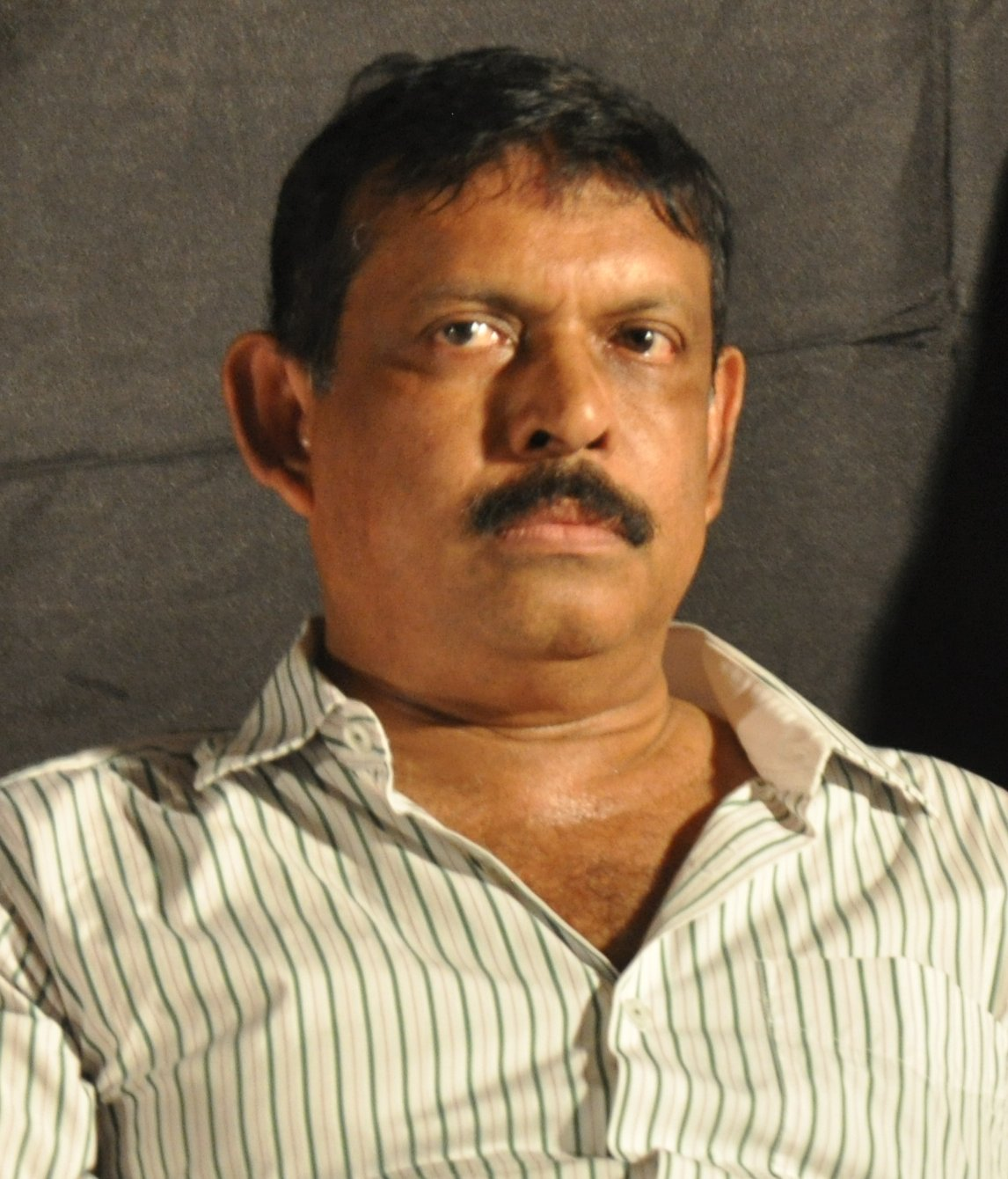
Chairman & Artistic Director - E.A. Rajendran

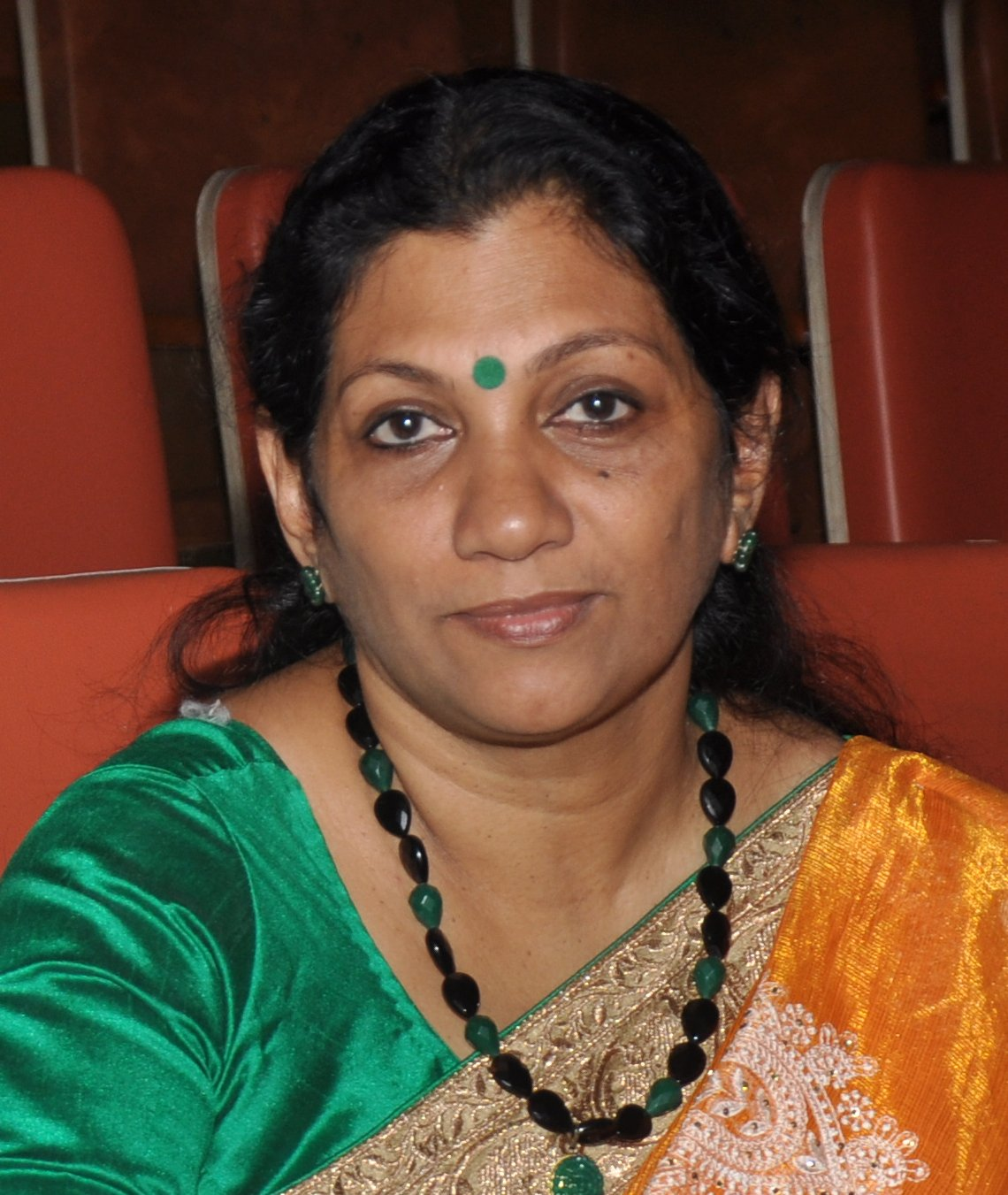
Treasurer - Sandhya Rajendran

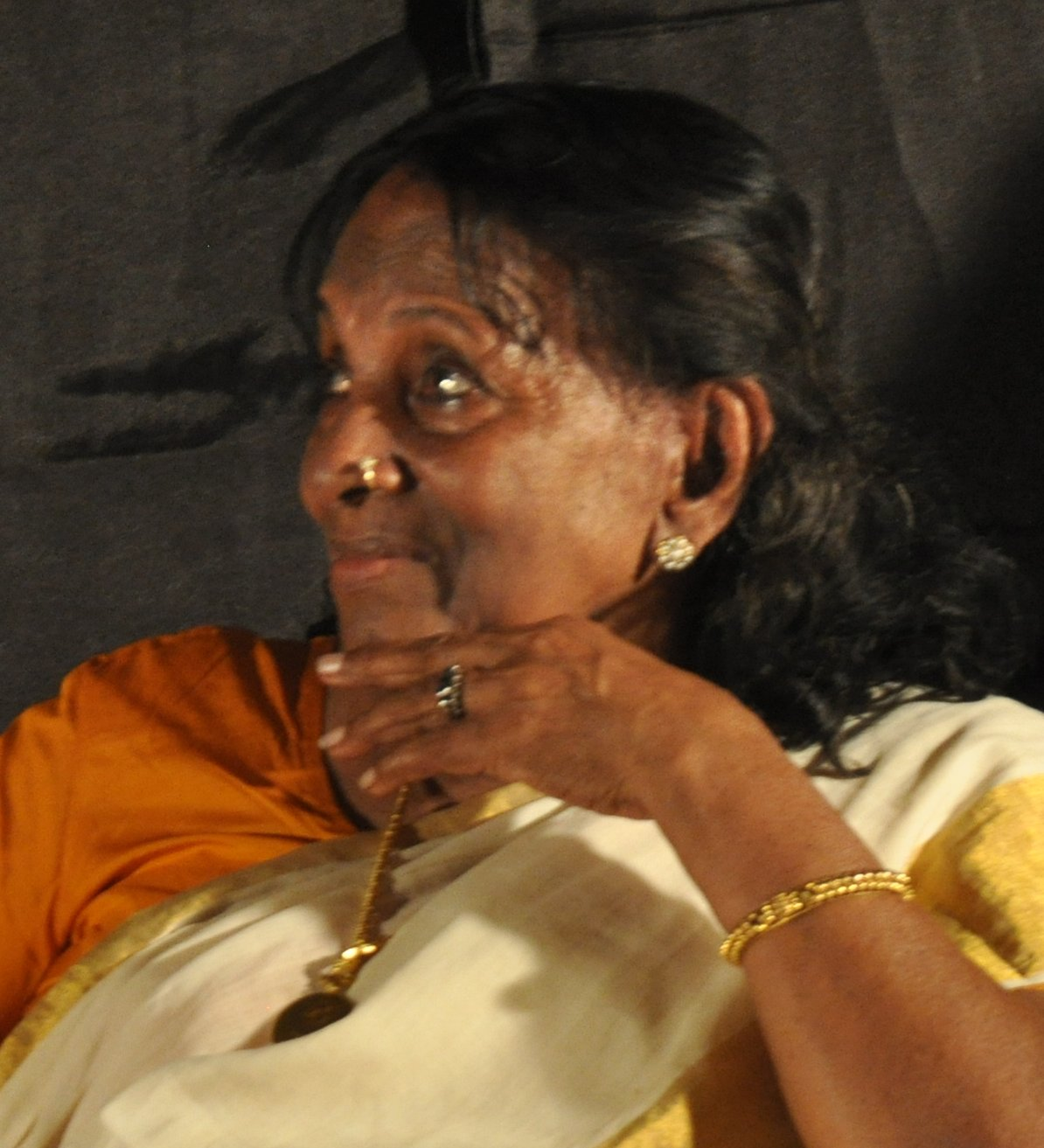
Secretary - Vijayakumari
