= Sreeja =

Indian actress (born 1971)

- Born: 18 April 1971 (age 55); Thiruvananthapuram, Kerala, India
- Occupations: Actress; dancer
- Years active: 1989–1994
- Spouse: Sandhana Pandian (m. 1993)
- Children: 2

Sreeja is a former Indian actress who was active in Malayalam films from 1989 to 1994. Her lead roles in Indrajaalam (1990) as Mohanlal's heroine and Cheriya Lokavum Valiya Manushyarum (1990) are well noted. She had acted only in a few films.

== Early life and education ==
Sreeja was born to theatre artists Sreedharan and Usha on 18 April 1971 in Thiruvananthapuram, Kerala. She had her primary education at Karthika Thirunal Government Vocational Higher Secondary School for Girls, Thiruvananthapuram and her bachelors from NSS Arts College for Women, Thiruvananthapuram. She has acted in a few dramas with her parents before entering the film industry.

== Career ==
Sreeja made her debut as a child artist with the 1982 Malayalam film Nidhi. She continued to act in small roles after that. She acted as a sister to Kamalahasan in Chanakyan (1989) and Jayaram in Mazhavilkavadi (1989). She made her debut as a heroine with Annakutty Kodambakkam Vilikkunnu (1989), the first film directed by Jagathy Sreekumar. She went on to act as a heroine to many actors, including Mohanlal in Indrajaalam (1990) and Mukesh in Cheriya Lokavum Valiya Manushyarum (1990) and Kazhchakkappuram (1992).

== Personal life ==
She is married to Sandhana Pandian who is from Tamil Nadu, co-star of her film Sevvanthi since 2 June 1993. The couple have a son and a daughter.

== Filmography ==
Year	Title	Role	Notes
1982	Nidhi		Child artist
1985	Mutharamkunnu P.O.		
1987	Oru Maymasa Pulariyil		
1988	Ormayil Oru Maninaadam		
1989	Annakutty Kodambakkam Vilikkunnu	Annakutty	
1989	Mazhavilkavadi	Vilasini	
1989	Chanakyan	Johnson's sister	
1989	Jagratha	Vandana	
1990	Dr. Pasupathy	Usha	
1990	Indrajaalam	Vinu	
1990	Champion Thomas	Selin	
1990	Mounam Sammadham	Vijayalakshmi	Tamil film
1990	Cheriya Lokavum Valiya Manushyarum	Neethu	
1991	Cheran Pandiyan	Vennila	Tamil film
1991	MGR Nagaril	Sr. Josephine/Ruby Philp	Tamil film
1991	Thaiyalkaran	Omana	Tamil film
1991	Daivasahayam Lucky Centre	Shalini	
1991	Kuttapathram	Sherley	
1991	Ezhunnallathu	Asha	
1992	Kaazhchakkappuram	Soudamini	
1992	Mudhal Kural	Rekha	Tamil film
1993	Ghoshayaathra	Safiya	
1993	Thanga Pappa	Thulasi	Tamil film
1994	Purushanai Kaikulla Poottukanum	Chithra	Tamil film
1994	Sevvanthi	Sevvanthi	Tamil film
1994	En Rajangam	Kalyani	Tamil film

== TV serials ==
- Oru Poo Viriyunnu (Doordarshan)
- Manushyabandhangal (Doordarshan)
- Kanakachilanka
- Ithikasa kathaigal (Raj TV) as Shakunthala
