= Mama Alludu =

- Directed by: Relangi Narasimha Rao
- Written by: Kaasi Viswanath (story / dialogues)
- Screenplay by: Relangi Narasimha Rao
- Produced by: Dasari Narayana Rao
- Starring: Rajendra Prasad; Dasari Narayana Rao; Vani Viswanath
- Cinematography: V. Pratap
- Edited by: B. Krishnam Raju
- Music by: Vasu Rao
- Production company: Dasari Cine Chitra
- Release date: 30 April 1990
- Running time: 134 mins
- Country: India
- Language: Telugu

Mama Alludu (transl. Father-in-law-Son-in-law) is a 1990 Telugu-language comedy film, produced by Dasari Narayana Rao and directed by Relangi Narasimha Rao. It stars Rajendra Prasad, Dasari Narayana Rao and Vani Viswanath. The film was remade in Kannada as Hendtheere Hushar (1992) and in Tamil as Purushanai Kaikulla Poottukanum (1994).

== Cast ==
- Rajendra Prasad as Vijay
- Dasari Narayana Rao as Rajeswara Prasad
- Vani Viswanath as Jaya
- Suthi Velu as Deku
- Brahmanandam
- Kaasi Viswanath as Watchman
- Kallu Chidambaram as Constable
- Peketi Sivaram
- Jayachitra as Bhavani Devi
- Vijaya Lalitha as Chamundeswari
- Anuradha as Alochana Devi
- Devi as Lila
- Chandrika as Patrika

== Soundtrack ==
Music composed by Vasu Rao.

| S. No. | Song title | Lyrics | Singers | length |
|---|---|---|---|---|
| 1 | "Idi Manmadha Samrajyam" | Dasari Narayana Rao | Mano, Radhika | 4:28 |
| 2 | "Mangalyam Tantunanena" | Dasari Narayana Rao | Mano, Radhika | 4:20 |
| 3 | "Gundelo Gusagusalu" | Varma | Mano, P. Susheela | 3:42 |
| 4 | "Seetapati Chapegathi" | Dasari Narayana Rao | Mano, Ravi Khanna, Vani Jayaram, P. Susheela | 4:30 |
| 5 | "Maavo Maavo Vankaya" | Dasari Narayana Rao | Mano, Murali Krishna | 5:30 |
