= Sevvanthi =

- Poster
- Directed by: P. S. Nivas
- Written by: Sundar Babu (dialogues)
- Story by: Harikrishnan
- Produced by: Shobha nivas
- Starring: Santhana Pandian; Sreeja
- Cinematography: P. S. Nivas
- Edited by: T. R. Sekar; K. R. Shankar
- Music by: Ilaiyaraaja
- Production company: Dhanisha Pictures
- Release date: 29 July 1994
- Running time: 160 minutes
- Country: India
- Language: Tamil

Sevvanthi is a 1994 Indian Tamil-language romantic drama film direction and photographed by P. S. Nivas, in his final directorial credit. The film stars Santhana Pandian and Sreeja, with Janagaraj, Charan Raj and Vennira Aadai Moorthy in supporting roles. It was released on 29 July 1994.

== Cast ==
- Santhana Pandian
- Sreeja as Sevvanthi
- Shanmugasundaram as Village Nattamai
- K. K. Soundar
- Janagaraj as Sevvanthi

Father

- C. R. Saraswathi as Sevvanthi

Mother

- Charan Raj
- Vennira Aadai Moorthy
- Meesai Murugesan

== Production ==
The film was in making for three years due to many problems. Actor Santhana Pandian (son of C. Aranganayagam) made his debut in the film. He and lead actress Sreeja got married during the filming of the film. It is Nivas' final film as director.

== Soundtrack ==
The music was composed by Ilaiyaraaja.

Song	Singer	Lyrics
Vaasamalli Poovu	Uma Ramanan	Ponnadiyan
Punnaivana Poonguyil	Arunmozhi, Swarnalatha	Piraisoodan
Ponnatam Poovattam	Mano, Swarnalatha	Vaali
Semmeene Semmeene	P. Jayachandran, Sunanda	Vaali
Anbe Aaruyire	S. P. Balasubrahmanyam	Muthulingam

== Reception ==
Reviewing the film for The Indian Express, Malini Mannath mentioned that "though his fairly neat, there is not much in the film which will hold the audience to their seats". Regarding the hero of the film, she mentioned that "He is confident and uninhibited before the camera and gets his expression right. His dialogue delivery reminds one of actor Ramarajan". R. P. R. of Kalki wrote that the one needs patience to watch this film; however he praised Ilaiyaraaja's music and Nivas' cinematography, calling them the only strong points of the film.
