= Champion Thomas =

- Poster
- Directed by: Rex
- Written by: Jagathy Sreekumar
- Produced by: Rex
- Starring: Jagathy Sreekumar; Sreeja; Sunny Augustine; Innocent; Mukesh
- Cinematography: Prathapan
- Edited by: L. Bhoominathan
- Music by: M. G. Radhakrishnan
- Production company: Jayjeevan Productions of India
- Distributed by: Jayjeevan Productions of India
- Release date: 15 November 1990
- Country: India
- Language: Malayalam

Champion Thomas is a 1990 Indian Malayalam-language film directed and produced by Rex and written by Jagathy Sreekumar. It stars Sreekumar, Sreeja, Sunny Augustine, Innocent, and Mukesh. The film has a musical score by M. G. Radhakrishnan.

== Plot ==
Velayudhan leads a normal life until he is discharged from the hospital after being cured of TB. On the way to his home, he encounters the strange spiritual strength of the deceased Thomas and gains his athletic personality. He reaches home and leads a normal life until he is noticed with this strange physical strength which gets his family in trouble. He is now admitted to a mental hospital against his wishes. Meanwhile, the bereaved wife of Thomas is being cajoled to marry Dr. Mathews who is treating Velayudhan. Thomas' spirit is awakened and warns Mathews to help Velayudhan by allowing him to compete in athletics and win against his arch-rival. His wish is granted, and Velayudhan wins the memorial athletics competition and subsequently, Thomas relieves him of his spirit.

== Cast ==
- Jagathy Sreekumar as Velayudhan
- Sreeja as Selin
- Sunny Augustine as Thomas George
- Innocent as Dr. Unnithan
- Mukesh as Dr. Mathews
- Thilakan as PC Nair
- Nedumudi Venu as Madhavan
- Aranmula Ponnamma
- Bobby Kottarakkara as Paramu
- Janardanan
- Kanakalatha as Nalini
- Mamukkoya
- Philomina
- Ajayan Adoor as Raghavan

== Soundtrack ==
The music was composed by M. G. Radhakrishnan, and the lyrics were written by K Jayakumar.

| No. | Song | Singers | Lyrics | Length (m:ss) |
|---|---|---|---|---|
| 1 | "Lillyppoomizhi" | K. J. Yesudas | K. Jayakumar | |
| 2 | "Lillyppoomizhi" (F) | K. S. Chithra | K. Jayakumar | |
| 3 | "Mey Thalarnnaalum" | K. J. Yesudas, K. S. Chithra | K. Jayakumar | |
