= Vijayakumari =

Indian actress

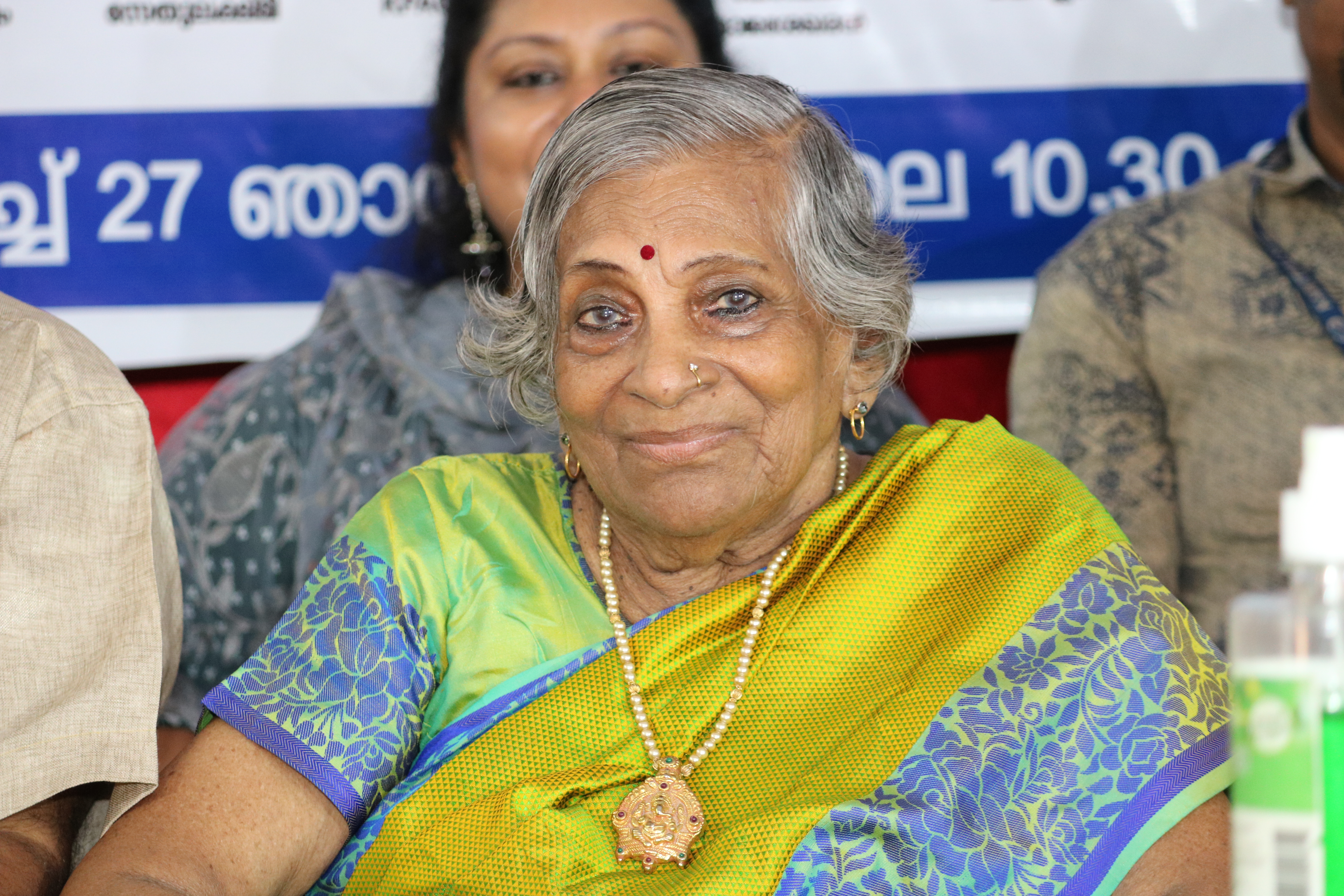
- Vijayakumari in 2013
- Born: 1936 (age 89–90); Kingdom of Travancore, British India (present day Kerala, India)
- Occupation: Actress
- Years active: 1964 – present
- Spouse: O. Madhavan
- Children: 3; including Mukesh
- Parents: Paramu Panicker; Bhargaviyamma
- Relatives: Divyadarsan R. Engoor (grandson)

Vijayakumari is an Indian stage, television and film actress. She was a stage actress at Kerala People's Arts Club and Kalidasa Kalakendra. She is the winner of the Kerala State award for best stage actress. She received the Kerala Sangeetha Nataka Akademi Award in 1976 and the Kerala Sangeetha Nataka Akademi Fellowship in 2005. Currently she is the Secretary of Kalidasa Kalakendra.

== Early and personal life ==
Vijayakumari was born to Paramu Panicker and Bhargaviyamma in a Ezhava family at Kollam. Her father was a boat captain and her mother was a cashew nut worker in a cashew factory at Kollam. Her father died when she was very young. She has a younger sister. She had her primary education from Cantonment School, Kollam.

She is married to O. Madhavan. They have three children, Mukesh, Sandhya Rajendran, (both are actors) and Jayasree Syamlal. Sandhya's husband, E. A. Rajendran is also a film actor.

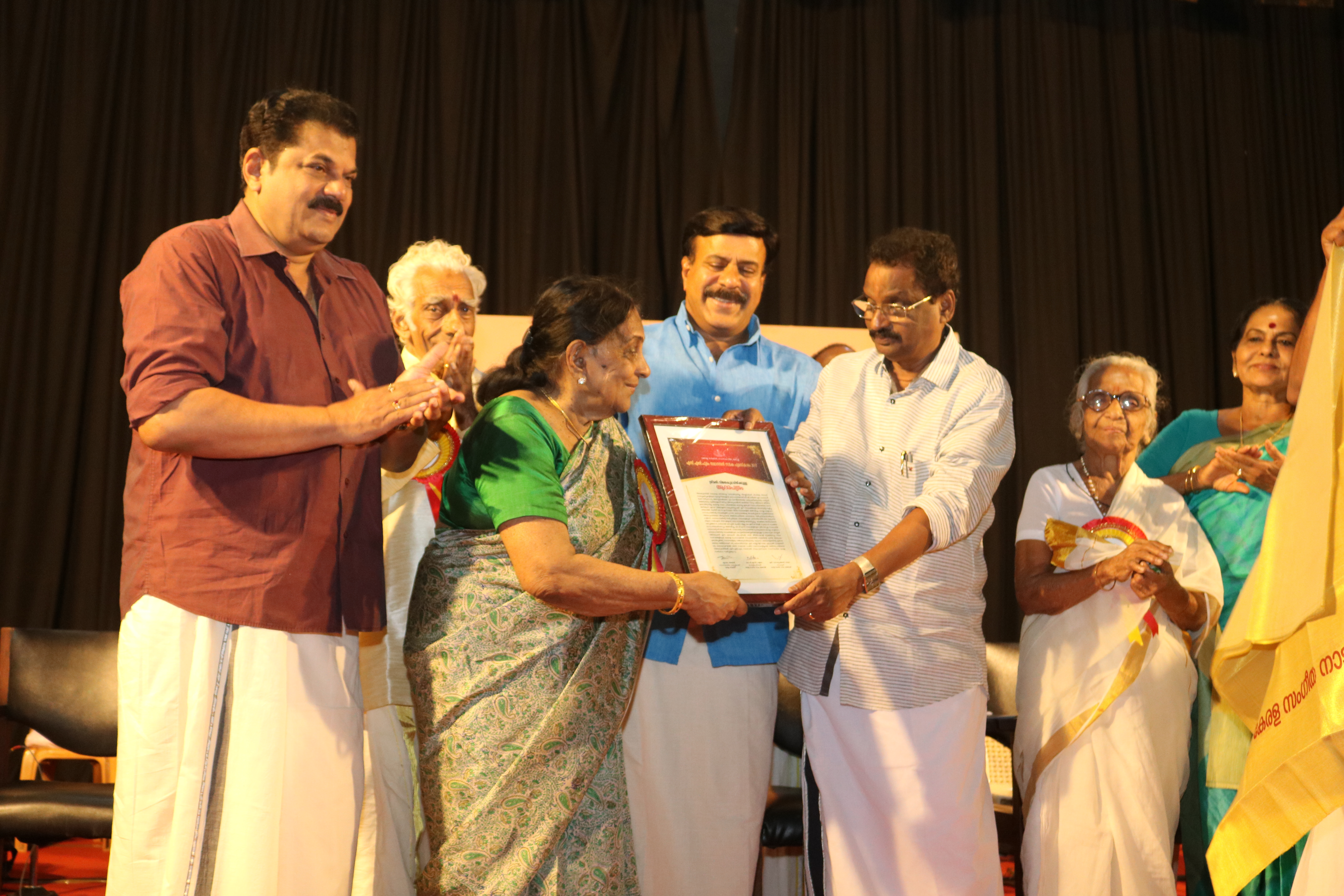
Vijayakumari KSNA S.L. Puram Award distribution 2019

== Filmography ==
- Ayisha (1964) .... Suhra
- Kochumon (1965) .... Gracy
- Kaattupookkal (1965)
- Thaara (1970) .... Kaalikutty
- Ningalenne Communistakki (1970)...Kalyani
- Panchavankaadu (1971) .... Naniyachi
- Lora Nee Evide (1971)
- Agnimrigam (1971)
- Oru Sundariyude Katha (1972)...Kunjiyamma
- Achanum Baappayum (1972) .... Yashodha
- Thottavadi (1973)
- Rajankanam (1976)
- Anavaranam (1976)
- Vedikkettu (1980)
- Venal (1980)
- Nattuchakkiruttu (1981)
- Artham (1989)
- Shubhayathra (1990)
- Aparna (1993)
- City Police (1993) ... Voice only
- Thenali (2000) ... Kamakshi
- Nandanam (2002) ... Parootty Amma
- Mizhi Randilum (2003)... Yashodhara
- Ammakilikoodu (2003) ...Kouslaya
- Jalolsavam (2004) ...Pappiyamma
- Madhuchandralekha (2006)...Chandramathi's mother
- Chiratta Kalippattangal (2006) .... Grandmother
- Chota Mumbai (2007)... Nadeshan's mother
- Heart Beats (2007)... Therutha chedathi
- Chandranilekkoru Vazhi (2008) ... Thumba
- Meghatheertham (2009) ... Artist
- Kadaaksham (2010) .... Old lady
- Chithrakkuzhal (2010)
- Anwar (2010) .... Umma
- Thaappana (2012) ... Bhavani
- Hide N' Seek (2012) ... Niranjan's mother
- Nadan (2013) ... Icheyi
- Ottamandaaram (2014)
- Karnavar (2014) ... Muthassi
- Veyilum Mazhayum (2014) ... Grandma
- Oru Second Class Yathra (2015) ... Old lady on the train
- Parayanullath (2015) ... Amma
- Olappeeppi (2016) ... Sreedharan's mother
- Oru KPAC Kaalam (2017) ... Herself
- Bottle Lockdown (2020) ... Omana
- Vidhi:The Verdict (2021) .... Eliyamma
- Acquarium (2022) ... Lady at garden
- Turning Point (2022)
- Ormakalil - a mother's passion (2022)
- Kanneerinum Madhuram

== Television serials ==
- Kanyadanam (Malayalam TV series)
- Pranayavarnangal
- Moonnumani
- Sandhyalakshmi
- Ezhilam Pala
- Manassu Parayunna Karyangal
- Mukesh Kathakal
- Neelaviriyitta Jalakam
- Santhwanam {telefilm}

== Drama ==
- Ningalenne Communistakki
- Mudiyanaya Puthran
- Doctor
- Puthiya Akasham Puthiya Bhoomi
- Kadalpalam
- Yudhabhoomi
- Althara
- Ramanan
- Swantham Leghakan
- Rainbow
