= Ezhunnallathu =

- Poster
- Directed by: Harikumar
- Screenplay by: S. Bhasurachandran
- Story by: Harikumar
- Produced by: Radhakrishnan
- Starring: Jayaram; Mukesh; Siddique
- Cinematography: Saroj Padi
- Edited by: G. Murali
- Music by: Johnson
- Production company: Chellam Films
- Distributed by: Priyanka Films
- Release date: 1991
- Country: India
- Language: Malayalam

Ezhunnallathu (transl. Procession) is a 1991 Indian Malayalam-language drama film directed by Harikumar and written by S. Bhasurachandran from a story by Harikumar. It stars Jayaram, Mukesh and Siddique.

== Plot ==
Josutty is in search of his brother from a pre-marital relationship of his father. Dasappan and Subramanyam join the search whereas Josutty has heart problems and wants someone to look after his mother and wealth. To his despair, he finds he was the son of his father born from pre-marital relationship. He finds himself in love and decides to go to abroad for the surgery.

== Cast ==
- Jayaram as Josutty
- Mukesh as Dasappan
- Siddique as Subramaniam
- Sithara as Ramani
- Sreeja as Asha
- Jagathy Sreekumar as Soman Pilla
- Innocent
- Kaviyoor Ponnamma
- Suchitra Murali as Sunanda
- Rajan P Dev as Ranger Uncle
- Philomina as Ammachy
- K. P. A. C. Sunny as Adv. V.B. Menon
- Jagannathan as Subramaniam's father
- Shivaji as Karunan
- Krishnankutty Nair as Njani Vasu Pillai
- Indrans as watch shop owner
