= Pranayavarnangal (TV series) =

Indian Malayalam-language soap opera

- Genre: Soap opera
- Created by: Shashi Mittal
- Based on: Ki Kore Bolbo Tomay
- Story by: Prashant Rathi; Manali Karia
- Directed by: K. K. Rajeev
- Starring: Richard Jose; Swathy Nithyanand
- Country of origin: India
- Original language: Malayalam
- No. of seasons: 1
- No. of episodes: 341

Production
- Producer: Divyadarshan
- Camera setup: Multi-camera
- Running time: 20-25 minutes
- Production company: Kalidasa Video Division

Original release
- Network: Zee Keralam
- Release: 18 October 2021 – 23 December 2022

Pranayavarnangal (transl. Colours of love) is an Indian Malayalam-language soap opera directed by K. K. Rajeev. The show premiered on 18 October 2021 on Zee Keralam and streams on-demand through ZEE5. The show is an official remake of Bengali series Ki Kore Bolbo Tomay. It portrays the love story of a fashion tycoon, Siddharth (Richard Jose) and his creative head, Aparna (Swathy Nithyanand).

== Cast ==
=== Main ===
- Richard Jose as Siddharth Narayanan (Siddhu)
- Swathy Nithyanand as Aparna Murali (Appu)

=== Recurring ===
- Divyadarshan as Balu Shankar (Balu)
- Ameya Nair as Riya
- Jismy as Thanusree (Thanu)
- Manju Satheesh as Amala Shankar (Aami)
- Lishoy as Sethupathi Narayan
- Manju Pathrose as Swayam Prabha
- E .A. Rajendran as Madhu Shankar
- Chinthu P as Sharath Das
- Joobi as Rukmini
- Sreelakshmi as Prathibha
- Jayachandran as Sathyardha Narayanan
- Greeshma as Swetha
- Shifa Yaazir
- Sajna Firoz as Bhavana
- Fawas as Shivakumar
- Veda Biju as Diya
- Shylaja Sreedharan Nair as Manju Sethupathi Narayan
- Kripa as Kripa
- Vijayakumari

=== Guest ===
- Ajay Vasudev as Himself
- Arun G Raghavan as Dev Krishna (DK)
- Meghna Vincent as Jyothirmayi (Jyothi)

== Production ==
=== Development ===
Pranayavarnangal is an official remake of Bengali television show Ki Kore Bolbo Tomay.

=== Casting ===
Lead actor Richard Jose lost almost 7 kg and grew his hair to transform as his character. He played Siddharth, a leading fashion designer. Swathy Nithyanand plays the female lead, Aparna. The show is directed by K. K. Rajeev.

=== Integration episodes ===
Lead actors Richard Jose and Swathy Nithyanand made guest appearances as their characters, Siddharth and Aparna in soap operas Kaiyethum Doorath and Mrs. Hitler, both in 2022.

== Soundtrack ==
Original Songs
No.	Title	Music	Singer(s)	Length
1.	"Mazhanananja Ravil"	Alphonse Joseph	Mridula Warrier, Arvind Venugopal	3:10
Total length:				3:10

== Reception ==
Reviewing the first episode of the show, a reviewer from The Times of India defined the show as, "a romantic tale in the backdrop of the stylish fashion industry". The reviewer praised the introduction scenes of the two leads, Aparna and Siddharth and also appreciated the other castings.

In a poll conducted on the official Instagram account of ETimes TV to pick the best entertainer between Thumbapoo and Pranayavarnangal, 69% of the respondents voted in favour of Pranayavarnangal.

== Adaptations ==
Language	Title	Original release	Network(s)	Last aired	Notes
Bengali	Ki Kore Bolbo Tomay কি কোরে বলবো তোমায়	16 December 2019	Zee Bangla	6 August 2021	Original
Malayalam	Pranayavarnangal പ്രണയവർണ്ണങ്ങൾ	18 October 2021	Zee Keralam	23 December 2022	Remake
