= Hide N' Seek (2012 film) =

- Promotional Poster
- Directed by: Anil
- Written by: Vikram S Nair
- Produced by: Sandhya Rajendran
- Starring: Mukesh; Shankar
- Cinematography: Anandakuttan
- Edited by: P.C.Mohanan
- Music by: Rajamani
- Production company: Kalidasa International Movies
- Release date: 8 December 2012
- Country: India
- Language: Malayalam

Hide N' Seek is a 2012 Indian Malayalam-language drama film directed by Anil. The film stars Mukesh, Divyadarshan, Sonia Mann and Shankar in pivotal roles. Kalidasa Kalakendram, a renowned drama company founded by O. Madhavan, ventured into film production through the film under Kalidasa International Movies. The film is loosely based on the critically acclaimed South Korean romantic drama film 3-Iron by Kim Ki-duk.

== Cast ==
- Mukesh as Solomon / Niranjan
- Shalu kurian as Mukesh's wife
- Divyadarshan as Naveen
- Natasha Doshi as Gowri
- Shankar as Niranjan
- Maha Gaida as Miryam, a Tunisian actress and an Arabic cinema expert
- Anil Murali

== Production ==
This was Rajamani's last film as music director. The director of photography of the film was Anandakkuttan and the songs were written by O. N. V. Kurup. The trio died in 3 consecutive days (13 February 2016 - ONV Kurup, 14 February 2016 - Anandakkuttan, 15 February 2016 - Rajamani).
