= Thanga Pappa =

- Directed by: R. Aravindraj
- Written by: R. Aravindraj
- Produced by: G. Jayachandran
- Starring: Shamili; Ramki; M. N. Nambiar; Thalaivasal Vijay; Aishwarya; Sreeja
- Cinematography: A. Ramesh Kumar
- Edited by: G. Jayachandran
- Music by: Deva
- Production company: Aarthi Films
- Release date: 2 July 1993
- Running time: 140 minutes
- Country: India
- Language: Tamil

Thanga Pappa (transl. Golden Baby) is a 1993 Indian Tamil-language supernatural horror film directed by R. Aravindraj. The film stars Shamili, Ramki, M. N. Nambiar, Thalaivasal Vijay, Aishwarya and Sreeja, with Chandrasekhar, Keerikkadan Jose, Thyagu, Raviraj, Murali Kumar and Prabhakaran playing supporting roles. The film, produced by the film editor G. Jayachandran, and Deva, was released on 2 July 1993.

== Plot ==
Ravi, his wife Gowri and their little daughter Abhirami move in an abandoned house. Ravi starts to work as an export manager in Ananthu and Swamy's company. Ravi is helped in his work by the police officer Rajasekhar, the customs officer Ameer, and Ananthu's son Balaji. That night, strange things happen in their house. Abhirami often meets the old man Adaikalam after the school in secret.

One day, Ameer, scared of something, accidentally falls off the ship and dies. The next day, Balaji is set on fire and dies from severe burns. Adaikalam then confesses to Gowri that Abhirami is in fact possessed by the spirit of his granddaughter Angela.

Four years ago, Adaikalam's son Assistant Commissioner of Police Lawrence got a transfer in a harbour city. He and his pregnant wife Thulasi moved to the city and eagerly waited for the birth of their baby. The scanning had revealed that the baby is a girl, so they named her Angela. From the very earliest days of his posting, Lawrence became well known by the local criminals. The smuggler Ananthu, his brother Swamy, and Balaji even threatened Lawrence and his wife, but Lawrence continued to seize Ananthu's illegal loads. Lawrence became friends with the Deputy Superintendent of Police Rajasekhar, his colleague. One night, Lawrence arrested Ananthu, Swamy, Balaji, and Ameer. They were all locked in the local police station. Rajasekhar released them and betrayed Lawrence's trust. Later that night, Lawrence was brutally killed and Thulasi was severely beaten up by the criminals in their house, resulting in abortion which left her mentally ill.

Ananthu, Swamy, and Rajasekhar also realise that Abhirami is possessed by the spirit. They are urged to kill the little girl. What transpires next forms the rest of the story.

== Cast ==
- Shamili as Abhirami
- Ramki as Lawrence (guest appearance)
- M. N. Nambiar as Adaikalam
- Thalaivasal Vijay as Ravi
- Aishwarya as Gowri
- Sreeja as Thulasi
- Chandrasekhar as Doctor Kurian
- Keerikkadan Jose as Ananthu
- Thyagu as Swamy
- Raviraj as Rajasekhar
- Murali Kumar as Ameer
- Prabhakaran as Balaji
- Veera Raghavan as Judge
- Peeli Sivam as Lawyer
- Krishnamoorthy as Lawyer
- Dakshinamoorthy as Church father
- Annadurai Kannadasan as Doctor

== Soundtrack ==
The music was composed by Deva, with lyrics written by the director Aravindraj.

Song	Singer	Duration
"Naan Paadum Thalattu"	Sunandha	4:01
"Aarararo Aariraaro"	Sunandha	3:31
"Thanga Pappa Santham"	S. P. Balasubrahmanyam, K. S. Chithra	4:39
"Abhirami Enakkoru Bathil	K. S. Chithra	2:20
"Berika Berika"	Kalpana	3:46

== Reception ==
Malini Mannath of The Indian Express called it a "fairly watchable film", she praised Deva's background score and Shamili's acting. At the 14th Cinema Express Awards, Shamili won the Best Child Artist award.
