= Kuttapathram =

- Directed by: R. Chandru
- Produced by: R. Chandru
- Starring: Suresh Gopi; Babu Antony; Sreeja; Jagathy Sreekumar
- Cinematography: Tony
- Edited by: P. C. Mohanan
- Music by: Rajamani
- Release date: 23 October 1991
- Country: India
- Language: Malayalam

Kuttapathram is a 1991 Indian Malayalam-language action thriller film directed and produced by R. Chandru. The film stars Suresh Gopi, Babu Antony, Sreeja and Jagathy Sreekumar in the lead roles. The film has musical score by Rajamani.

== Cast ==
- Suresh Gopi as Customs officer Alex
- Babu Antony as Vicky
- Sreeja as Shirley
- Jagathy Sreekumar as Viswambharan
- Innocent as Innocent
- Baiju as Tony
- Mahesh as Mahesh
- Rajan P. Dev as Augustine Fernandez
- Vijayaraghavan as Dysp Sethu
- Krishnankutty Nair as Mithran
- Ganesh Kumar as Peter
- Jalaja as Geetha
- Kollam Thulasi as Adv. Narendran
- Shivaji as SI Aravindan
- Valsala Menon as Clara

== Soundtrack ==
The music was composed by Rajamani and the lyrics were written by Mankombu Gopalakrishnan.

No.	Song	Singers	Lyrics	Length (m:ss)
1	"Eeran Chodikalil"	K. S. Chithra, M. G. Sreekumar	Mankombu Gopalakrishnan	
2	"Kaalam Panchari"	M. G. Sreekumar, Chorus	Mankombu Gopalakrishnan	
