= Richard N. J. =

Indian television actor

- Born: 11 December
- Other name: Richard Jose
- Occupation: Actor
- Years active: 2012–present

Richard N. J., also known as Richard Jose, is an Indian television actor who appears in Malayalam-language television shows. After making his debut in the 2012 TV series Pattu Saree, he rose to fame by playing the leading role of Jayachandran in the soap opera Karuthamuthu from 2014 to 2017.

== Career ==
Richard made his television debut through Pattu Saree aired in Mazhavil Manorama from 2012 to 2014. He played the parallel lead character of Jayachandran in Asianet's popular soap-opera drama Karuthamuthu. He then appeared in serials, Mizhi Randilum, Ennu Swantham Jani, Mangalyapattu and Mamattikutty. He played a possessive husband, Suryanarayana Varma in television series Sumangali Bhava. He played a leading fashion designer, Siddharth Narayan in Pranayavarnangal alongside Swathy Nithyanand.

== Filmography ==
=== Television ===
Year(s)	Show	Role	Channel	language	Notes	Ref.
2012–2014	Pattu Saree	Abhijith Chettiyar (Abhikuttan)	Mazhavil Manorama	Malayalam	Debut	
2014–2017	Karuthamuthu	Jayachandran (Jayan)	Asianet	Malayalam	breakthrough role	
2016	Mizhi Randilum	Nakulan	Surya TV	Malayalam		
2016–2017	Ennu Swantham Jaani		Surya TV	Malayalam		
2016–2017	Mangalyapattu	Renjith Kartha	Mazhavil Manorama	Malayalam		
2017	Mamattikutty	Sachy	Flowers TV	Malayalam		
2017	Sathyam Shivam Sundaram		Amrita TV	Malayalam		
2019–2021	Sumangali Bhava	Suryanarayana Varma	Zee Keralam	Malayalam		
2021–2022	Pranayavarnangal	Siddharth Narayan	Zee Keralam	Malayalam		
2022	Kaiyethum Doorath	Siddharth	Zee Keralam	Malayalam	Cameo appearance	
2022	Mrs. Hitler	Siddharth	Zee Keralam	Malayalam	Cameo appearance	
2023	Madhanakamarajan	Madhanan	YouTube	Malayalam	web serial	
2023–2025	Idhayam	Aadhi	Zee Tamil	Tamil		
2023–present	Nindu Noorella Savaasam	Major Amarendra Varma	Zee Telugu	Telugu		
2025– present	Idhayam – Season 2	Aadhi	Zee Tamil	Tamil		

==== TV shows ====
Year(s)	Show	Role	Channel	Notes	Ref.
2017	Onnum Onnum Moonu	Guest	Mazhavil Manorama		
2020	Onamamangam	Guest	Surya TV		
2020	Let's Rock N Roll	Contestant	Zee Keralam		
2021	Sa Re Ga Ma Pa Keralam	Guest	Zee Keralam		
2021	Manju Bhavangal	Guest	Zee Keralam		
2022	Red Carpet	Mentor	Amrita TV		
