= Purushanai Kaikkulla Pottukkanum =

1994 film by Balanna

- Directed by: Balanna
- Story by: Dasari Narayana Rao
- Produced by: M. Vijay Kothari
- Starring: Janagaraj; Manjula; Nizhalgal Ravi; Sreeja; John Babu; Pallavi
- Cinematography: G. Rajendran
- Edited by: A. P. Manivannan
- Music by: S. A. Rajkumar
- Production company: Kothari Creations
- Release date: 18 March 1994
- Country: India
- Language: Tamil

Purushanai Kaikkulla Pottukkanum (transl. Keep your husband under your thumb) is a 1994 Indian Tamil-language comedy film directed by Balanna in his debut. The film stars Janagaraj, Manjula, Nizhalgal Ravi, Sreeja and Pallavi. It is a remake of the 1990 Telugu film Mama Alludu. The film was released on 18 March 1994.

== Cast ==
- Janagaraj
- Manjula
- Nizhalgal Ravi
- Sreeja
- John Babu
- Pallavi

== Production ==
Purushanai Kaikkulla Pottukkanum, a remake of the 1990 Telugu film Mama Alludu, is the directorial debut of Balanna. It was produced by M. Vijay Kothari of Kothari Creations. Cinematography was handled by G. Rajendran, and editing by A. P. Manivannan.

== Soundtrack ==
The soundtrack was composed by S. A. Rajkumar, who also worked as lyricist alongside Vairamuthu.

Track listing
| No. | Title | Singer(s) | Length |
|---|---|---|---|
| 1. | "Enga Thodanga" | Mano, K. S. Chithra |
| 2. | "Idhu Aadham" | Mano, K. S. Chithra |
| 3. | "Kannu Sokkuthu" | Mano, Malaysia Vasudevan |
| 4. | "Mappillai" | Mano, Malaysia Vasudevan |

== Release and reception ==
Purushanai Kaikkulla Pottukkanum was released on 18 March 1994. Malini Mannath of The Indian Express called it "an average entertainer that lays more emphasis on the spoken word than visuals." R. P. R. of Kalki said the film's plus points were the clear purpose and non-confusing screenplay.
