= E. A. Rajendran =

Indian actor and director (1955–2026)

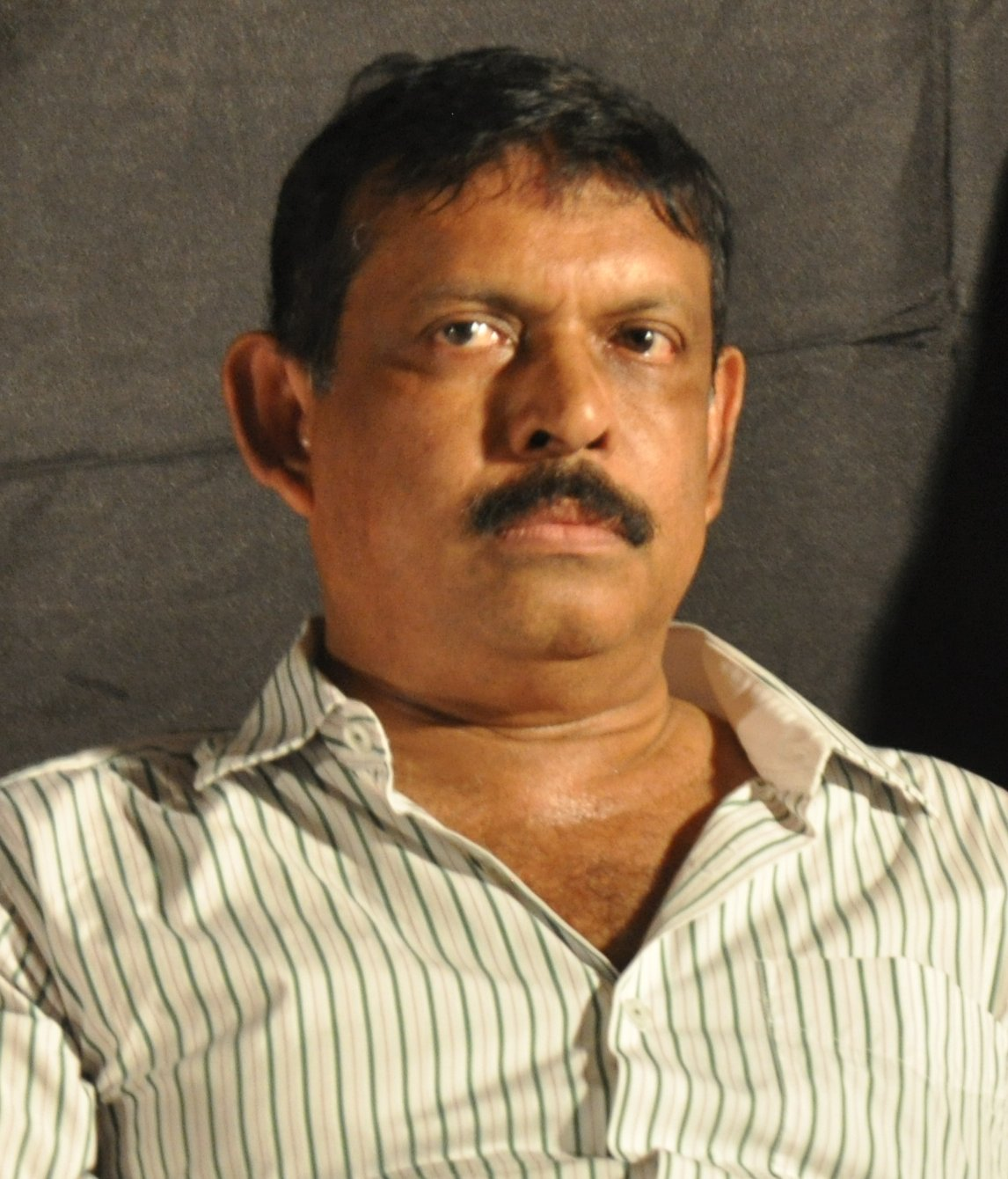
- Rajendran in 2013
- Born: E. A. Rajendran; 1955; Thrithallur, Thrissur, Kerala, India
- Died: 26 March 2026 (aged 70–71); Pattathanam, Kollam, Kerala, India
- Occupations: Actor, producer
- Years active: 1981 − 2026
- Spouse: Sandhya Rajendran
- Children: Divyadarsan (son)
- Relatives: Mukesh (brother-in-law)

E. A. Rajendran (1955 – 26 March 2026) was an Indian actor and stage director from Kerala.

== Life and career ==
Rajendran completed his graduation from National School of Drama and his post graduation from Film and Television Institute of India. He was the brother-in-law of popular actor and former Kollam MLA Mukesh.

Rajendran died in the early hours of 26 March 2026, at the age of 71. He was survived by wife Sandhya and son, Divyadarshan, also an actor. Rajendran was suffering from diabetes at the time of his death.

== Selected filmography ==
- Greeshmam (1981)
- Kavadiyattam (1993)
- Kaliyattam (1997)
- Pranayavarnangal (1998)
- Daya (1998)
- Pattabhishekam (1999)
- Thachiledathu Chundan (1999)
- Veendum Chila Veettukaryangal (1999)
- Vazhunnor (1999)
- Udayapuram Sulthan (1999)
- Narasimham (2000)
- Meesa Madhavan (2002)
- Parthan Kanda Paralokam (2008)
- Manthrikan (2012)
- Female Unnikrishnan (2015)
- Porinju Mariam Jose (2019)

== Awards ==
Rajendran was awarded as the Best Director at the Venjaramoodu Ramachandran Memorial State Professional Drama Festival (2010) for his drama, Ramanan.
