= Mazhavilkavadi =

- Poster
- Directed by: Sathyan Anthikad
- Written by: Raghunath Paleri
- Produced by: Siyad Koker
- Starring: Jayaram; Urvashi; Sreeja; Sithara; Innocent; Mamukkoya; Karamana Janardanan Nair; Kaviyoor Ponnamma; Philomina; Sankaradi; Krishnankutty Nair; Oduvil Unnikrishnan
- Cinematography: Vipin Mohan
- Edited by: K. Rajagopal
- Music by: Johnson
- Production company: Kokers Films
- Release date: 1989
- Running time: 130 minutes
- Country: India
- Language: Malayalam

Mazhavilkavadi (transl. Rainbow Burden) is a 1989 Indian Malayalam-language comedy drama film directed by Sathyan Anthikad and written by Raghunath Paleri. It stars Jayaram, Sithara, Krishnankutty Nair, Urvashi, and Innocent in the lead roles. This is one of the very few films where Innocent plays a negative role. It won four Kerala State Film Awards that year, the awards for Best Actress (Urvashi), Best Supporting Actor (Innocent), Best Music Director (Johnson), and Best Singer (K. S. Chithra).

The film was remade in Tamil as Subramaniya Swamy with Pandiarajan.

== Plot ==
Velayudhankutty is in love with his cousin, Amminikutty, but her father, Shankarankutty Menon, opposes their union. Shankarankutty Menon has a compulsive obsession to assault those who do not obey him. To make money, Velayudhankutty goes to Palani. He tries to find a man named Kunjikhader who claims to be the supervisor of a leather factory for help after being told by his father, Nanukuttan. After searching for a few days at Palani with the help of a horse-cart driver Murukan, he finds that Kunjikhader is a pickpocket currently in prison. He claims to be the supervisor of a leather factory because he has many stolen leather purses. Kunjikadher comes out of jail by fooling the police, claiming to be going to Madurai. Velayudhankutty steals a bag from a Tamil barber and starts his own business as a barber. The barber's daughter falls in love with him. Meanwhile, Kunjikhader causes chaos in Velayudhankutty's village by picking pockets. Kunjikhader and his associates kidnap Amminikutty to take her to Palani, but none of them know how to drive a car, and they end up with the police. Velayudhankutty lies to Amminikutty that he has been employed in the leather factory Kunjikhader works at. When Shankarankutty Menon opposes their marriage again, Amminikutty attempts suicide but is saved. Later, Shankarankutty Menon's family arrives in Palani and learns the truth. In the end, Velayudhankutty marries Amminikutty.

== Cast ==
- Jayaram as Panadaravalappil Velayudhankutty
- Sithara as Amminikutty
- Urvashi as Anandavalli
- Krishnan Kutty Nair as Kaleeswaran Kavalayil Kali Muthu
- Valsala Menon as Bhairavi
- Innocent as Kalarickel Kizhakamthudiyil Shankarankutty Menon
- Meena as Nangeli
- Karamana Janardanan Nair as Nanukuttan
- Kaviyoor Ponnamma as Velayudhankutty's mother
- Sreeja as Vilasini
- Philomina as Velayudhankutty's grandmother
- Mammukkoya as Kunjikhader
- Bobby Kottarakkara as Murukan
- Paravoor Bharathan as Vasu
- Oduvil Unnikrishnan as Kunjappu
- Jagannathan as Ubaid
- Sankaradi as Kuriya Varkey

== Soundtrack ==
The film had musical score composed by Johnson and the lyrics were written by Kaithapram

No.	Title	Artist(s)	Length
1.	"Mainakaponmudiyil"	G. Venugopal, Choir	3:58
2.	"Pallitherundo"	G. Venugopal, Sujatha Mohan	4:29
3.	"Thankathoni"	K. S. Chithra	4:28

== Awards ==
Kerala State Film Awards

- Best Actress - Urvashi
- Best Supporting Actor - Innocent
- Best Music Director - Johnson
- Best Singer - K. S. Chithra

== Box office ==
The film was a commercial success.
