= Cheriya Lokavum Valiya Manushyarum =

- Movie Poster
- Directed by: Chandrasekharan
- Screenplay by: T. A. Razaq; A. R. Murukesh
- Story by: Chandrasekharan
- Starring: Mukesh; Innocent; Jagathy Sreekumar; Mamukkoya; Thilakan
- Cinematography: Saloo George
- Edited by: Rajashekaran
- Music by: Johnson
- Production company: Chaithram Cini Arts
- Distributed by: Charangat Release
- Release date: 1990
- Country: India
- Language: Malayalam

Cheriya Lokavum Valiya Manushyarum (transl. Small world and big humans) is a 1990 Indian Malayalam-language comedy caper film directed by Chandrasekharan and written by T. A. Razaq and A. R. Murukesh from a story by Chandrasekharan. The film stars Mukesh, Innocent, Jagathy Sreekumar, Mamukkoya, Thilakan, and Sreeja. Cheriya Lokavum Valiya Manushyarum is the first Malayalam film to mention the psychedelic drug LSD.

== Plot ==
The story is about four thieves-turned-philanthropists, Abu, Balu, Rokky, Sugunan, starting from the time they were thieves. They cross paths by chance and join forces leading to a robbery attempt at a house that goes awry but leads to their reformation at the hands of the house owner who himself is a robber-turned-philanthropist. The plot also shows how Karunan spurs them into robbing the corrupt rich and giving to the poor, in the mould of Robin Hood, portraying two such gutsy episodes; first bringing to book a treacherous money lender Sunny and next an unscrupulous business man and drug-dealer Madhava Menon. The second episode culminates in the murder of an accomplice of Madhava Menon, Dr. Narendran, at the hand of one of the four heroes, but Karunettan owns up to the murder so as to exonerate him and let the good work continue.

== Cast ==
- Mukesh as Balu
- Innocent as Rokky
- Jagathy Sreekumar as Sugunan
- Mamukkoya as Abu
- Thilakan as Karunettan
- Sreeja as Neethu
- Babu Namboothiri as Madhava Menon
- Kollam Thulasi as Dr.Naredran
- Shivaji as Sunny
- Jagannathan as Servant
- Sreelatha Menon as Staff of Sunny Financiers
- Kavitha Thambi as Ambili, Menon's Daughter

== Songs ==
The songs for this movie were written by Kaithapram Damodaran Namboothiri and was composed by Johnson.

- "Thoovennilavu": G. Venugopal, Sujatha Mohan
- "Athikkulangara Melam": M. G. Sreekumar, Sujatha Mohan
