= Idhayam (2023 TV series) =

2023 Indian Tamil TV series

- First Season Montage
- Genre: Melodrama; Romance
- Written by: Saravanan
- Screenplay by: Saravanan
- Directed by: S.N.Rajkumar; B. Vinoth Kumar
- Starring: Janani Ashok Kumar; Richard Jose; Pallavi Gowda
- Music by: Karaneeswaran
- Country of origin: India
- Original language: Tamil
- No. of seasons: 2
- No. of episodes: 1157

Production
- Producers: Anil Sundar; Guhan Manohar
- Cinematography: Arjunan Karthik
- Editor: Udhayachanthiran
- Camera setup: Multi-camera
- Running time: 20–22 minutes
- Production company: Rajammal Creations

Original release
- Network: Zee Tamil
- Release: 28 August 2023 – present

Idhayam - Maranathai Vendra Kaadhal Kadhai (transl. Heart - The Love Story That Conquered Death) is an Indian-Tamil language television series started airing on Zee Tamil from 28 August 2023.

== Plot ==
The first season of the series starred Janani Ashok Kumar, Richard Jose, Annie Aaliya, Riya Vishwanathan and R.Shyam in the lead roles, with Puvi Arasu making a special appearance. It revolves around a famous businessman Aadhi who falls in love with a small-town widow, Bharathi. It is a popular, feel-good series from Zee Tamil. The chemistry between Janani and Richard was widely admired by general audiences and they were the first Matinee Serial Pair on Zee Tamil to receive the 'Popular Pair' Award due to their immense popularity as Aadhi Bharathi. The first season premiered on 28 August 2023, and ended on 22 March 2025 with 640 episodes.

The second season of the series, Idhayam - Ninaivugalaal Azhiyadha Kaadhal (transl. Heart - A love that immortalized by memories) premiered on 24 March 2025 as the continuation from the previous season with a 5-year leap. It starts with Pallavi Gowda (who replaced Janani from the previous season) with Richard J in the lead. This season failed to garner the attention and popularity created by the original series.

== Series overview ==
Series	Episodes	Originally released	
Series	Episodes	First released	Last released
1	640	28 August 2023	22 March 2025
2	data-sort-value="" style="background: #DDF; color:black; vertical-align: middle; text-align: center; " class="skin-invert no table-no2" | TBA	24 March 2025	Present

== Synopsis ==
=== Season 1 ===
Aadhi is the sole heir of Saradha. He has been suffering from a heart ailment since young and requires a heart transplantation surgery to live. On his wedding day, he suffers a heart attack and is rushed to the hospital. He miraculously survives after undergoing a heart transplantation surgery in which he received the heart from Vasu, a young man from a middle class family and Bharathi's husband, who was brain dead because of a bike accident. After receiving a new life thanks to the new heart, he undergoes a profound change in his personality. His heart becomes tender and his eyes swell with tears whenever he sees Bharathi and her daughter Tamizh. His heart begins to palpitate at every instance with their presence. He falls in love with her without realizing it. The story is about what happens next in their lives.

=== Season 2 ===
5 Years later

5 years later Bharathi is now working in a company in which the company owner's sister happen to be Aadhi's present love and fiancee. With the turn in twist of events Bharathi gets to meet Aadhi which was never expected to happen again. Will this sudden meet join them to restart a new lease of live together or will Bharathi never forgive Aadhi for leaving them will be answered in the upcoming episodes

== Cast ==
=== Season 1 ===
Main

- Janani Ashok Kumar as Bharathi
  - Vasu's wife turned widow, Tamizh's mother and Aadhi's wife
- Richard Jose as Aadhi
  - A famous businessman, who underwent a heart transplant using Vasu's heart, Shwetha's ex fiance, Bharathi's second husband
- Annie Aaliya as Tamizharasi aka Tamizh
  - Vasu and Bharathi's daughter, Aadhi's step-daughter
- Puvi Arasu as Vasu
  - Bharathi's first husband, who died due to brain death from the bike accident plotted by Arivu and his heart was transplanted to Aadhi.
- Riya Vishwanathan as Aandal
  - Bharathi's best friend and Azhagar's wife
- Shyaam as Azhagar
  - Aadhi's best friend and Aandal's husband

Aadhi's family

- Sujatha Panju as Saradha
  - Aadhi's mother, Arivu & Bhavani's elder sister, Bharathi's mother in law
- Sankavi Rajendran as Shwetha
  - Aadhi's ex fiancee, Arivu & Parvathy's daughter, Dhurai's wife
- Sasilaya as Bhavani
  - Egamparam's wife, Anandh's mother, Aadhi's father's murderer.
- Isaac Varghese as Egamparam
  - Aadhi's uncle, Bhavani's husband
- Vasanth Gopinath as Arivu
  - Aadhi's uncle, Shwetha's father, Vasu's murderer, Dhurai's father in law
- Priyanka as Parvathy
  - Arivu's wife, Shwetha's mother, Dhurai's mother in law
- Surjith Ansary as Anandh
  - Egamparam & Bhavani's son, Aadhi & Shwetha's cousin

Bharathi and Vasu's family

- Ravi Chandran as Rathnam
  - Dhanam, Vasu and Dhurai's father, Maragatham's husband, Bharathi, Mani & Shwetha's father in law
- Agalya Saro as Maragatham
  - Dhanam, Vasu and Dhurai's mother, Rathnam's wife, Bharathi, Mani & Shwetha's mother in law
- Vetrivel as Mani
  - Rathnam & Maragatham's son-in-law, Dhanam's Husband, Vasu and Dhurai's Brother-in-law
- Sahana Chandirabal (2023) / Dheshika Jagannathan (2023–present) as Dhanam
  - Rathnam & Maragatham's daughter, Mani's wife, Vasu and Dhurai's elder sister, Bharathi and Shwetha's sister in law
- Rajesh as Dhurai
  - Dhanam and Vasu's younger brother, Sumathi's love interest, Shwetha's husband
- Akshara as Sumathi
  - Dhurai's love interest
- Geetha as Saraswathi
  - Bharathi's mother, Tamizh's grandmother, Aadhi's mother in law
- Santhosh as Chithambaram
  - Bharathi's father, Tamizh's grandfather, Aadhi's father in law

Aandal's family

- Parthiban as Dharmalingam
  - Aandal's father
- Rajeshwari as Kalaivani
  - Aandal's mother
- A. Revathi as Aandal's grandmother
- Vidhya as Vidya
  - Aandal's sister

Azhagar's family

- Pushpa as Lakshmi
  - Azhagar's mother
- Rohit Ved as Azhagar's father
- Nisha as Azhagar's cousin sister

Others

- Ayesha Zeenath as Sathya / Soumya
  - Aadhi's friend, who poses as Aadhi's lover in front of Bharathi (Cameo)
- Karuna Vilasini as Raani
  - Tamizh's caretaker appointed by Aadhi
- Vishwanathan as Sekar
  - Vasu's friend
- Dhachayani as Latha
  - Bharathi's best friend and colleague, Keshav's wife
- Arun Padmanabhan as Saravanan
  - Aadhi's friend
- Abhinash Ganapathi as Pandi
- Santhosh as Keshav
  - Aadhi's best friend and personal secretary, Latha's husband.
- Sana as Nisha
  - Mithra's best friend; Aadhi's colleague and friend
  - Nisha's best friend; Aadhi's colleague and obsessive one-sided girlfriend (Cameo)

=== Season 2 ===
Main

- Pallavi Gowda as Bharathi
  - Vasu's wife turned widow, Tamizh and Jr.Aadhi's mother and Aadhi's wife
    - Janani Ashok Kumar as Bharathi (Cameo)
- Richard Jose as Aadhi
  - A famous businessman, who underwent a heart transplant using Vasu's heart, Shwetha's ex fiance, Bharathi's second husband; Tamizh's stepfather; Jr.Aadhi's father
- Annie Aaliya as Tamizharasi aka Tamizh
  - Vasu and Bharathi's daughter, Aadhi's step-daughter, Jr.Aadhi's half-sister
- Master Sarvesh as Aaditya alias Jr.Aadhi
  - Bharathi and Aadhi's son; Tamizh's half-brother

Supporting

- Subbulakshmi Rangan as Mithra
  - Aadhi's colleague and obsessive one-sided girlfriend
- Rajeshwari as Kalaivani, Aandal's mother
- A. Revathi as Aandal's grandmother
- Sree Priya as Abi
- P. R. Varalakshmi as Rajeswari
  - Mithra's grandmother
- Sasilaya / Shilpa Mary Teresa as Bhavani
  - Egamparam's wife, Anandh's mother, Aadhi's father's murderer.
- Isaac Varghese as Egamparam
  - Aadhi's uncle, Bhavani's husband
- Sujatha Panju as Saradha
  - Aadhi's mother, Arivu & Bhavani's elder sister, Bharathi's mother in law
- Arun Padmanabhan as Saravanan
  - Aadhi's deceased friend
- Merwen Balaji as Anandh
  - Egamparam & Bhavani's son, Aadhi & Shwetha's cousin

Special Appearances

- Arun Muthuswamy as Arun
- Sana as Nisha
  - Mithra's best friend; Aadhi's colleague (Cameo)
- Vaishnavi Arulmozhi as Veera
- Malavika Avinash as Muthulakshmi
- Vanitha Vijayakumar as Saroja
- Mirchi Senthil as Shanmugam
- Nithya Ram as Bharani Shanmugam
- Priyanka Nalkari as Lawyer Madhumitha

== Production ==
=== Season 1 ===
Janani Ashok Kumar, a popular known face made her first female lead role in television. She also marks her return after Sembaruthi in Zee Tamil. Malayalam actor Richard Jose was cast as the male lead, making this his Tamil debut. Sujatha Panju was roped for an important role as Aadhi's mother and Puvi was cast as Vasu in a cameo role.

=== Season 2 ===
In the end of March 2025, a five-year leap was introduced, bringing several new characters into the show who became pivotal. Actress Pallavi Gowda was introduced as new Female lead replaced Janani, in the five-year leap, playing Bharathi. Actress Farina Azad was cast as Aadhi's colleague and obsessive one-sided girlfriend, but in end of June she quit the series, and it was replaced by actress Subbalakshmi Rangan.

Actor Arun Muthuswamy was cast as Arun in special Appearances. In end of July 2025, actress Malavika Avinash was cast as special Appearance.

=== Release ===
The first promo was released on 6 August 2023 featuring Janani Ashok Kumar, Richard Jose and Puvi Arasu, depicting the story with a song and revealing the leads. The second promo was unveiled on 17 August 2023, featuring protagonists Richard Jose and Janani Ashok Kumar, also revealing the release date and time.

It began airing on Zee Tamil on afternoon slot at 02:00PM. In Singapore & Malaysia, Idhayam airs at 9.30pm SGT and 10.00pm MYT respectively.
