= Vazhunnor =

- Theatrical release poster
- Directed by: Joshiy
- Written by: Benny P. Nayarambalam
- Screenplay by: Benny P Nayarambalam
- Produced by: G. P. Vijayakumar
- Starring: Suresh Gopi; Sangita; Samyuktha Varma; Sreenath; Siddique; Janardhanan; Jagathy Sreekumar; N. F. Varghese; E. A. Rajendran; Krishna
- Cinematography: Anandakuttan
- Edited by: K. Sankunni
- Music by: Songs: Ouseppachan; Background Score: S. P. Venkatesh
- Production company: Seven Arts International LTD
- Distributed by: Seven Arts International LTD
- Release date: 20 October 1999
- Running time: 160 minutes
- Country: India
- Language: Malayalam

Vazhunnor (transl. Reigners) is a 1999 Indian Malayalam-language action thriller film directed by Joshiy and written by Benny P. Nayarambalam. The film stars Suresh Gopi, Sangita, Samyuktha Varma, Sreenath, Siddique, Janardhanan, Jagathy Sreekumar, N. F. Varghese, E. A. Rajendran, and Krishna. The film was scored by S. P. Venkatesh and songs were composed by Ouseppachan.

== Plot ==
Thevakattill Avarachan is an established businessman in a town in central Travancore. Together with his six sons, he controls all businesses in the town. The family is known for its philanthropic efforts, too.

Kuttappayi, the youngest son, is a bachelor and acts as the muscle of the family. Later, he falls for Rebecca, a new teacher at the family-owned school. After a brief romantic feud, the family arranges the engagement of the pair.

The story tenses when the PK Group, headed by Parakaddan Kochouseph, returns to settle old scores they have with the Thevakkattu family. It is revealed that Kuruvilla, the eldest of Avarachan's sons, refused to marry Kochouseph's daughter Kochammini in the past. In the ensuing feud, Kuruvilla is killed, and Mathachan, another son of Avarachan, loses his leg. In the end, Kuttappayi avenges his brothers and saves Kochammini, who is then taken into the Thevakkattu family.

== Cast ==
- Suresh Gopi as Thevakkattu Joseph Avarachan aka Kuttappayi
- Sangita as Rebecca
- Samyuktha Varma as Rani Kuruvilla aka Ranimol
- Sreenath as Adv. Thevakkattu Simon
- Siddique as CI Thevakkattu Paulachan
- Janardhanan as Thevakkattu Avarachan
- Jagathy Sreekumar as Thevakkattu Mathachan
- N. F. Varghese as Thevakkattu Kuruvilla
- E. A. Rajendran as Dr. Thevakkattu Zachariah
- Narendra Prasad as Parakkadan Kochousepp
- Sai Kumar as Parakkadan Aloshy
- Spadikam George as Parakkadan Andrews
- Cochin Haneefa as Vadakkethala Sivadas
- Krishna as Tony, Rani's lover
- Jagannatha Varma as Kuriakose, Tony's father
- Srividya as Kochammini
- Keerikkadan Jose as CI Sahadevan (Voiceover by Shammi Thilakan)
- Shammi Thilakan as SP Chandrakumar
- K. P. A. C. Azeez as Kunjoonju, Rebecca's Father
- Jose Prakash as Bishop
- Machan Varghese as Cleetus, Kuttappayi's friend
- Kalabhavan Rahman as Charlie, Kuttappayi's friend
- Narayanankutty as Luckose, Kuttappayi's friend
- M. S. Thripunithura as Isaac Varghese, Headmaster
- James as Karyasthan Pillai
- Mohan Jose as Keeri
- Yamuna as Simon's wife
- Chandni Shaju as Paulachan's wife
- Kaviyoor Renuka as Chechiyamma, Kuruvila's wife
- Ponnamma Babu as Mary, Mathachan's wife
- Reena as Zachariah's wife
- Irshad as Sub Inspector of Police Stephen
- Ravi Menon as Minister Alex Isaac
- Vijay Menon as Salim, Kuttappayi's friend
- Indulekha as Rebecca's sister
- Nivia Rebin as Rebecca's sister
- Nandu Pothuval as Goonda
- Sidharaj as Thorappan Jose
- Abraham Koshy as Sub Inspector of Police

== Box office ==
The film was a huge box office success and has since earned a cult status within the industry; it further turned out to be one of the highest-grossing films of the year. Suresh Gopi's portrayal of the character "Kuttapayi" was widely acknowledged, and many, including pundits, filmmakers, and directors, have credited it as one of the best in his career.

== Soundtrack ==
S. P. Venkatesh composed the film score. The songs were composed by Ouseppachan, for which the lyrics were written by Gireesh Puthenchery.

No.	Song	Singers	Length (m:ss)
1	"Azhake"	K. S. Chithra, M. G. Sreekumar	
2	"Azhake Annoraavaniyil"	M. G. Sreekumar	
3	"Mathimukhi" (Marthoman Nanmayay)	K. S. Chithra, Sreenivas	
4	"Ponnaanappuramerana"	M. G. Sreekumar	
5	"Sandhyayum Ee Chandrikayum"	K. J. Yesudas	
6	"Sandhyayum Ee Chandrikayum"	Sujatha Mohan	
