= Oru Sundariyude Katha =

- Poster
- Directed by: Thoppil Bhasi
- Written by: P. Kesavadev; Thoppil Bhasi (dialogues)
- Screenplay by: Thoppil Bhasi
- Produced by: Kunchacko
- Starring: Prem Nazir; Jayabharathi; K. P. A. C. Lalitha; Adoor Bhasi
- Cinematography: U. Rajagopal
- Edited by: G. Venkittaraman
- Music by: G. Devarajan
- Production company: Udaya Pictures
- Distributed by: Excel Productions
- Release date: 28 July 1972
- Country: India
- Language: Malayalam

Oru Sundariyude Katha is a 1972 Indian Malayalam-language film directed by Thoppil Bhasi and produced by M. Kunchacko. The film stars Prem Nazir, Jayabharathi, KPAC Lalitha and Adoor Bhasi. The film has musical score by G. Devarajan. This was the debut film of actor Nedumudi Venu.

== Cast ==
- Prem Nazir as Maadan/Kuttappan
- Jayabharathi as Sundari/Lathika
- KPAC Lalitha as Pankajakshi
- Adoor Bhasi as Unthuvandi Krishnankutty
- Manavalan Joseph as Divakaran
- Jesey as Georgekutty
- Adoor Pankajam as Pachiyakka
- Alummoodan as Naanukuttan
- K. P. Ummer as Engineer
- O. Madhavan
- S. P. Pillai as Pappu Shipayi
- KPAC Beatrice as Kunjamma
- Vijayakumari as Kunjiyamma
- Mavelikkara Ponnamma as Thankachi
- Cherthala Lalika as Contractor's wife
- S. Aroor
- Kottayam Narayanan
- Johnson
- Jisha Mol
- Mahila Mani
- Aaradan
- Thoppil Krishnapilla
- Nedumudi Venu
- Faazil

== Soundtrack ==
The music was composed by G. Devarajan with lyrics by Vayalar Ramavarma.

No.	Song	Singers	Lyrics	Length (m:ss)
1	"Arayilottamundudutha"	K. J. Yesudas	Vayalar Ramavarma	
2	"Navami Mahaanavami"	P. Susheela	Vayalar Ramavarma	
3	"Paavanamadhuraanilaye"	P. Jayachandran, Chorus	Vayalar Ramavarma	
4	"Seethappakshi Seethappakshi"	P. Susheela	Vayalar Ramavarma	
5	"Venna Tholkkumudalode"	K. J. Yesudas	Vayalar Ramavarma	
