= Divyadarsan R. Engoor =

Indian actor

Divyadarsan
- Born: Kollam, Kerala, India
- Occupations: Actor; Producer
- Years active: 2012–present
- Parents: E. A. Rajendran; Sandhya Rajendran
- Relatives: Mukesh (uncle); O. Madhavan (grandfather); Vijayakumari (grandmother)

Divyadarsan Rajendran Engoor known mononymously as Divyadarsan is an Indian actor and producer from Kerala, India. He made his debut in Malayalam cinema through Hide N' Seek (2012).

== Personal life ==
Divyadarsan was born in Pattathanam, Kollam, Kerala as the only son of actor E. A. Rajendran and Sandhya Rajendran. He is the grandson of theater artist and writer O. Madhavan and Vijayakumari, who is also an actress. He is also the nephew of actor and politician Mukesh.

== Career ==
Divyadarsan made his entry into the Malayalam cinema industry in a lead role through Anil's Hide N' Seek, which was also his home production. He also acted in the movies Mr. Bean, Teens and Kootathil Oral. In 2014, Divyadarshan played the lead in Jahangir Shams's Karanavar.

== Filmography ==
Year	Title	Role	Notes
2012	Hide N' Seek	Naveen	
2013	Teens		
2013	Mr Bean		
2014	Kootathil Oral		
2014	Karanavar		
2015	Lord Livingstone 7000 Kandi	The tribal Engineer	
2015	Rockstar	Trans beauty stylist	
2017	Masterpiece	Deepan	
2020	Shylock		
2021	Nabikka		
2021	Swpanangalkkumappuram		
2025	Aap Kaise Ho		

== Television ==
Year	Title	Producer	Actor	Director	Channel	Notes	Ref.
2000	Ezhilampaala	No	Yes	No	Sun Surya	Debut	
2020-2021	Anna Kareena	Yes	No	No	Flowers TV		
2020	Bottle Lockdown	Yes	Yes	Yes	Flowers TV		
2021	Moodal Manju	Yes	No	No	Flowers TV		
2021–present	Kanyadanam	Yes	Yes	No	Sun Surya	Cameo appearance in promo, uncredited role in episode 665	
2021-2023	Pranayavarnangal	Yes	Yes	No	Zee Keralam	As Balu Shankar	
2021-2024	Sundari	Yes	No	Yes	Sun Surya		
