= Mukesh (actor) =

Indian actor and politician

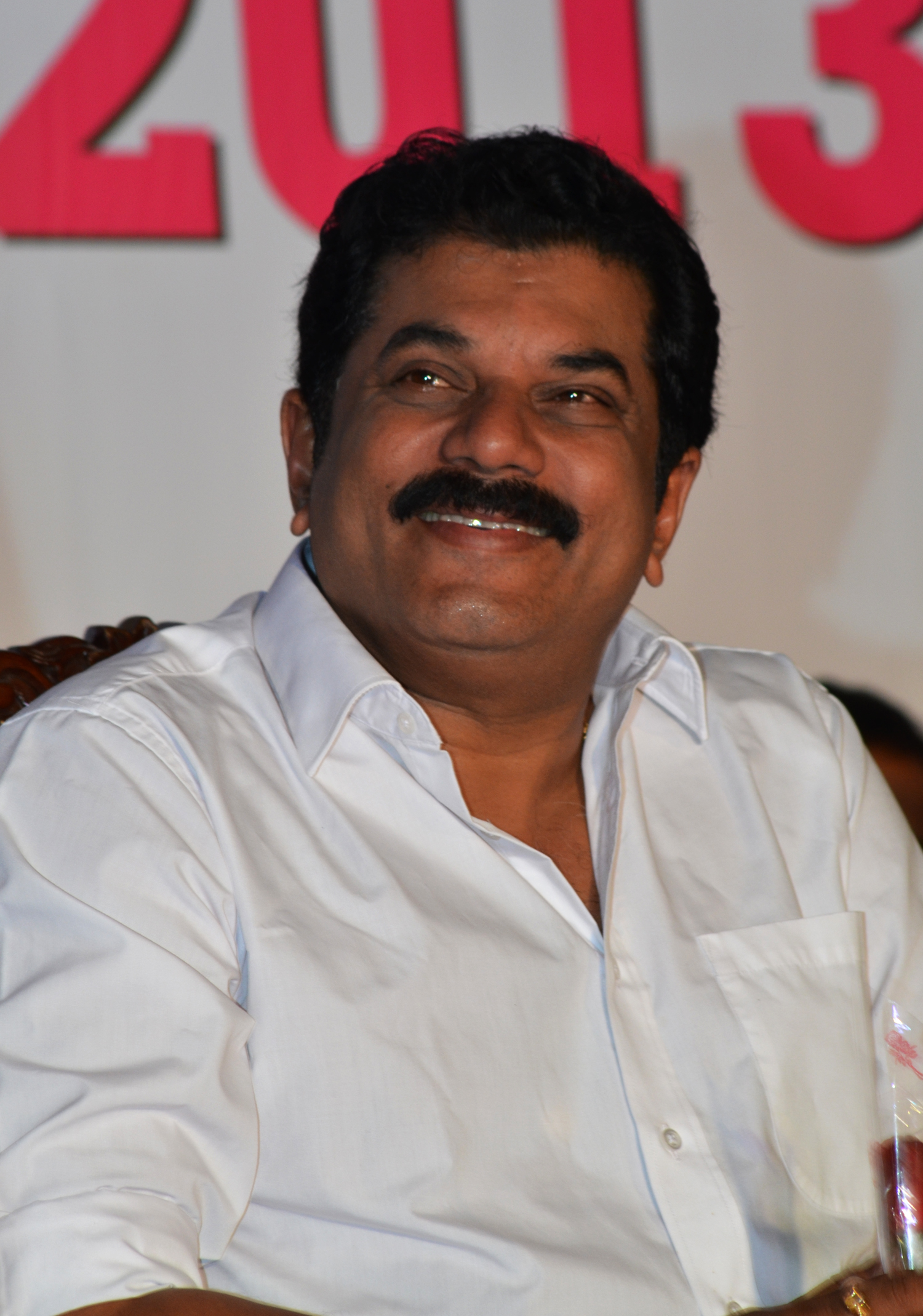

Member of the Kerala Legislative Assembly
- In office 2 June 2016 – 23 May 2026
- Preceded by: P. K. Gurudasan
- Succeeded by: Bindhu Krishna
- Constituency: Kollam

Personal details
- Born: Mukesh Babu; 5 March 1957 (age 69) Kollam, Kerala, India
- Party: Communist Party of India (Marxist)
- Spouses: Saritha (m. 1988; div. 2011); Methil Devika (m. 2013; div. 2021)
- Children: 2
- Parents: O. Madhavan (father); Vijayakumari (mother)
- Relatives: Divyadarsan R. Engoor (nephew); E. A. Rajendran (brother-in-law)
- Occupation: Actor; film producer; TV host; politician

Mukesh Madhavan (born Mukesh Babu; 5 March 1957), known mononymously as Mukesh, is an Indian actor, film producer, television presenter, and politician who predominantly works in Malayalam cinema besides also having sporadically appeared in Tamil-language films. In a film career spanning four decades, he has acted in over 275 Malayalam films.

He made his onscreen debut in the 1982 film Balloon in the leading role. His 1996 film Kaanaakkinaavu premiered at the IFFI and won the Nargis Dutt Award for Best Feature Film on National Integration. He co-produced Kadha Parayumbol (2007), which won the Kerala State Film Award for Best Film with Popular Appeal and Aesthetic Value. He also produced the 2012 film Thattathin Marayathu, which is considered one of the defining films of the Malayalam New Wave.

He was the chairman of the Kerala Sangeetha Nataka Academy. Mukesh served as a member of the Kerala Legislative Assembly representing the Kollam constituency from 2016 to 2026.

== Early life ==
Mukesh was born to the actors O. Madhavan and Vijayakumari, in Kollam, Kerala, on the 5th of March 1957. He has two sisters, Sandhya Rajendran and Jayasree Shyamlal. Sandhya and her husband, E. A. Rajendran, are also actors (stage and film).

Mukesh attended Infant Jesus Anglo-Indian School in Kollam. He then pursued a B.Sc. in Botany from S.N. College in Kollam. He also holds an LL.B. from Kerala Law Academy, Thiruvananthapuram.

Mukesh was active in the stage dramas before his entry into the film industry.

== Acting career ==
=== 1982–1989 ===
Mukesh made his acting debut as a lead actor in the movie Balloon. Later, that same year he acted in the drama film Ithu Njangalude Katha, a remake of the Tamil-language film Palaivana Solai along with Sreenath and Sanghi Krishna. The film was a hit, with the film's songs becoming chartbusters. In the mid-80s, he appeared in several comedy films directed by Priyadarshan, usually in supporting roles. His first film as solo hero came in 1985 with Mutharamkunnu P.O. Despite being an average grosser at the box office, the film has over the years attained a cult status. His first major commercial hit came with the 1985 film Boeing Boeing, directed by Priyadarshan. He starred alongside Mohanlal as one of the leads in the movie. This was his first collaboration with Mohanlal. They would go on to star in several films in the late 1980s, usually starring Mohanlal in the lead role. Examples include Ninnishtam Ennishtam (1986), Adiverukal (1986), Hello My Dear Wrong Number (1986) and Mazha Peyyunnu Maddalam Kottunnu (1986). He also appeared in supporting roles to Mammootty in the late-80s with successful films like Snehamulla Simham (1986), Shyama (1986), Thaniyavarthanam (1987), 1921 (1988), Sangham (1988), Mahayanam (1989) and Nair Saab (1989). In 1988, he appeared as Chacko in the cult investigative thriller Oru CBI Diary Kurippu also featuring Mammootty. The character of Chacko has over the years attained a cult status. He reprised his role as Chacko in the CBI series sequels in 1989, 2004, 2005 and 2022. Then, in 1989, he starred in Ramji Rao Speaking, a blockbuster that ran for 200 days in theatres and went on to become the second highest grossing film of the year. The film gave Mukesh his major break. Ramji Rao Speaking is considered by audiences and critics to be one of the best comedy films made in Malayalam cinema. The film still has a huge cult following. The film has been subject to many memes, with Mukesh's dialogue in the film "Kambilipothappu" becoming a catchphrase. He also starred alongside Mohanlal in Vandanam (1989), which is considered a cult classic in Malayalam cinema.

=== 1990–1999 ===
In the beginning of the 1980, he made an extended guest role in Priyadarshan's Akkare Akkare Akkare, which was the sequel to Patanapravesham (1989). After the success of Ramji Rao Speaking, he was offered many leading roles. The film Cheriya Lokavum Valiya Manushyarum was then released, which was a commercial success. Following the success of Cheriya Lokavum Valiya Manushyarum he again collaborated with Siddique-Lal for In Harihar Nagar, which is considered to be one of the defining films of the Malayalam golden age of comedy. The film was a box office success, running for 100 days in theatres. The film established Mukesh as a bankable lead actor in the industry. The film has over the years accumulated a cult following and huge fan base, with many scenes from the film being used in memes and online trolls today. Following the success of In Harihar Nagar, a series of unrelated low budget comedy films featuring the principal cast of the film were produced. These films usually starred Mukesh, Jagadeesh or Siddique in the lead roles. In 1990 he also formed a successful onscreen pairing with another rising star, Jayaram with successful films like Thoovalsparsham, Marupuram and Malayogom. He also starred as solo hero in commercially successful films like Gajakesariyogam, Ottayal Pattalam and Champion Thomas in the same year. His role as a serial womanizer in Kouthugal Vaartakal boosted his popularity as a lead actor. He also made his Tamil debut that same year in Manaivi Oru Manickam.

He then, in 1991 starred in the classic comedy film, Godfather directed by Siddique-Lal, another blockbuster, the film ran for 417 days at Sreekumar Theatre in Trivandrum. Godfather became the longest running film in Malayalam film industry. The film established him as one of the major stars of the Malayalam film industry. He then teamed up with director P. G. Vishwambaran, who had earlier directed him in Ithu Njangalude Katha (1982), in several successful films like Innathe Programme and Irrikku M. D. Akathundu. He then starred in the 1991 cult slapstick comedy film Mookilla Rajyathu, in which he played the role of a mental patient who escaped from a mental asylum. The film is widely regarded as a classic in Malayalam cinema. He starred in the critically acclaimed Kakkathollayiram in which he played the role of the brother to mentally ill woman. He also worked with Shaji Kailas in Souhrudam (1991), in which he starred alongside Urvashi, Sai Kumar and Parvathy. However, Souhrudam was a box-office bomb. The next year, he starred alongside Jayaram in Kamal's Aayushkalam (1992), a super hit at the box office. This was the first in a set of successful collabs with director Kamal. They then teamed up for the romantic comedy Ennodishtam Koodamo, another super hit. He then starred in Makkal Maahathmiam, which was written by Siddique-Lal. He then played the role of a petty thief in Manyanmar. This was his first onscreen pairing with Sreenivasan. The following year, he starred in the Balachandra Menon directorial Ammayane Sathyam. The film was also a box office success, running for 100 days in theatres. The next year, he starred in Malappuram Haji Mahanaya Joji, another box office success. It ran for 125 days in theatres and was one of the highest grossers of the year.

He appeared in notable films such as Sipayi Lahala and Mannar Mathai Speaking (the sequel to Ramji Rao Speaking). He appeared in a supporting role to Mammootty in the 1996 comedy-drama film Hitler, directed by Siddique of the Siddique-Lal duo. Hitler became one of the highest-grossing Malayalam films of all time. He then starred in Sibi Malayil's 1996 film Kanakkinavu, which was screened at the Indian Panorama section of the IFFI and won the Nargis Dutt Award for Best Feature Film on National Integration. The film was also commercially successful. The next year, all of his films except for Kalyana Kacheri, bombed at the box office. The following year, he starred in Mattupetti Machan, which was one of the highest grossers of the year and ran for 100 days in theatres. It was remade in Tamil as Banda Paramasivam, in Hindi as Housefull 2. He then made a cameo appearance as himself in the Sreekrishnapurathe Nakshathrathilakkam. 1999 was a successful year for Mukesh as he starred in two super-hits namely, Friends, which was the highest grosser of the year (He starred alongside Jayaram for the first time in 7 years and Sreenivasan) and alongside Divya Unni in the Vinayan directorial Aakasha Ganga, which was the fourth highest grossing film of the year.

=== Later career ===
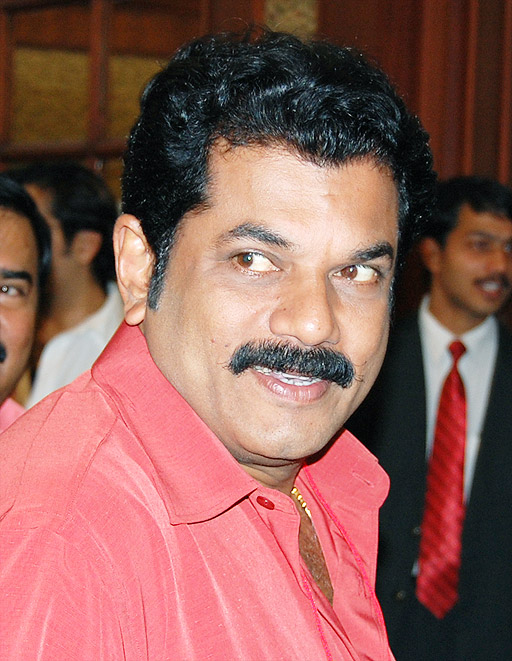
Mukesh in 2008

In the 2000s and 2010s, he struggled to escape an image trap. Regardless, he came back with interesting supporting roles in Udayananu Tharam, Goal, Vinodayathra, Boyy Friennd, Kaiyoppu, Naalu Pennungal and Katha Parayumbol. He has been a part of many of Mohanlal's comedies, most of them directed by Priyadarshan. He also ventured into production with Sreenivasan, their first movie, Katha Parayumbol, featured a cameo by Mammootty.

In 2018, casting director Tess Joseph alleged that Mukesh had summoned her to his room multiple times around 19 years earlier. Mukesh denied the allegations.

Mukesh was the host of a Malayalam version of Deal or No Deal, which was aired on Surya TV. He is now acting in Badai bungalow, a comedy and celebrity talk show hosted by Ramesh Pisharody, launched on Asianet from 2013.

After the publication of the Hema Committee report in 2024, an actress alleged that Mukesh had sexually harassed her.

== Personal life ==
He married South Indian film actress Saritha in 1988, and they have two sons. After a lengthy separation, they divorced in 2011. Their elder son Shravan made his acting debut in the 2018 film Kalyanam. Mukesh married dance scholar Methil Devika on 24 October 2013. The couple filed for divorce in 2021.

In 2007, Mukesh authored a book based on experiences while he was a student at college, and tales from his life as a movie actor. titled Mukesh Kathakal – Jeevithathiley Nerum Narmavum. It proved very successful. He authored another book, Mukesh Babu and Party in Dubai, published by DC Books in 2009, marketed as a "realistic campus novel".

Mukesh's former wife Saritha has alleged that he subjected her to emotional and physical abuse during their marriage. She also claimed that he had multiple extramarital affairs.

=== Arrest on rape charges ===
On 24 September 2024, Mukesh was arrested by a Special Investigation Team in connection with a rape case. Following his arrest, Mukesh underwent a medical examination and potency test. He was subsequently released after being granted anticipatory bail by a sessions court earlier that month, as confirmed by his lawyer."

== Political career ==
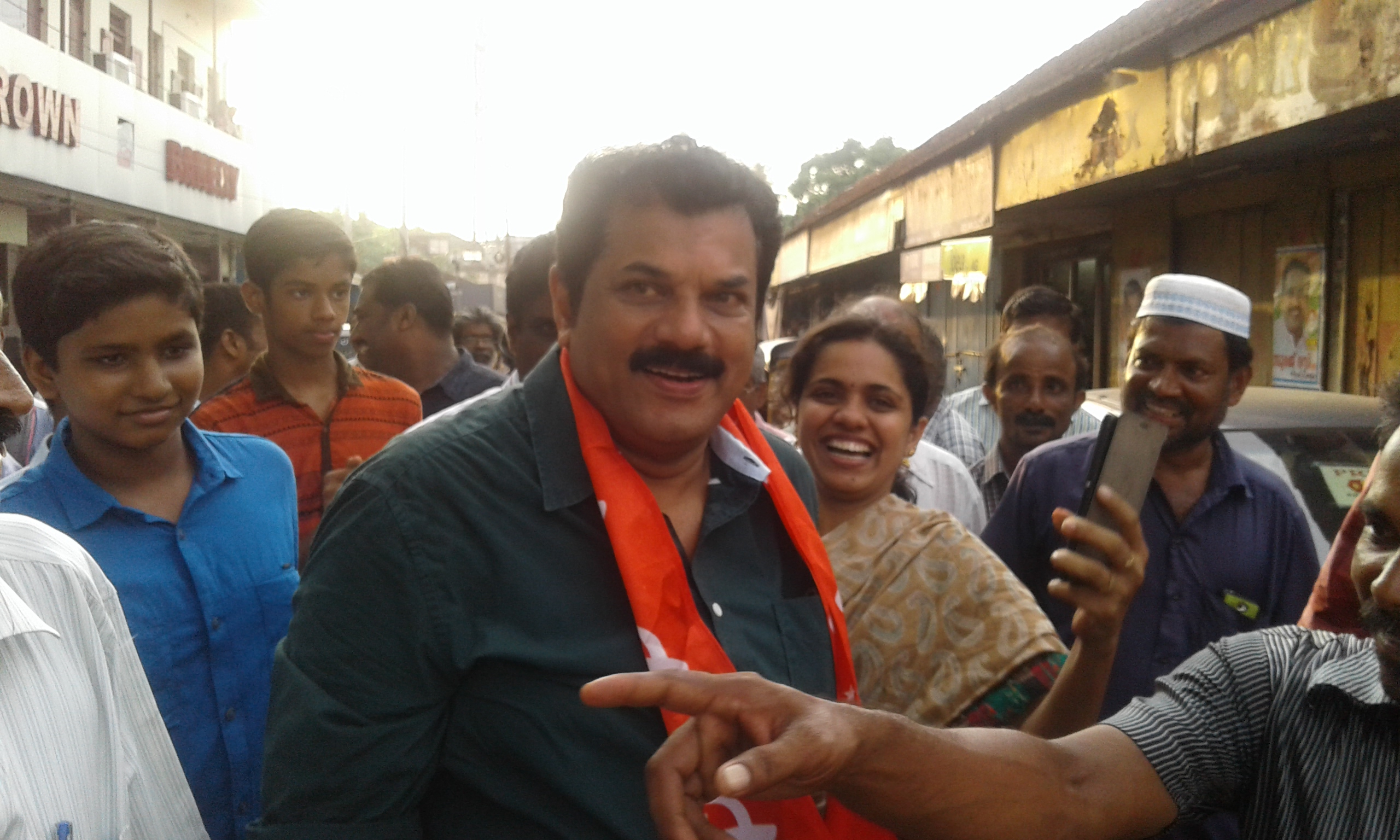
Mukesh at Kollam, during the election campaign in 2016

Mukesh is a member of the Communist Party of India (Marxist) (CPI-M). He was elected to the Kerala Legislative Assembly from Kollam Assembly constituency in the 2016 Kerala Legislative Assembly election. He won again from the same constituency in the 2021 Kerala Legislative Assembly election. However, his victory margin came down from 17,611 in 2016 to 2072 in 2021. In the 2024 Indian general election, Mukesh contested for the Lok Sabha from the Kollam constituency but lost to N.K. Premachandran, the sitting UDF candidate.

== Awards ==
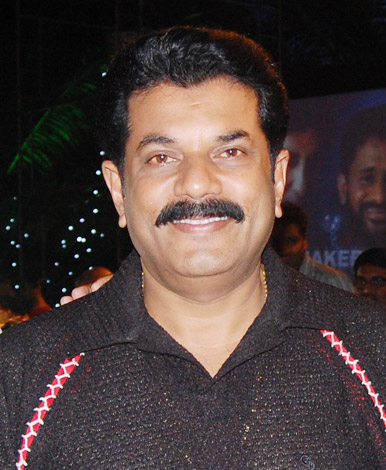
Mukesh in 2010

- 2007 : Asianet Film Award for Best Film (Producer) – Kadha Parayumbol
- 2007 : Filmfare Award for Best Film – Malayalam (Producer) – Kadha Parayumbol
- 2007 : Kerala State Film Award for Best Film with Popular Appeal and Aesthetic Value-Kadha Parayumbol
- 2011 : ISC Award
- 2013 : Kerala Film Critics Association Awards - Second Best Actor - English: An Autumn in London, Vasanthathinte Kanal Vazhikalil

== Filmography ==
=== Malayalam films ===
==== 1980s ====
Year	Title	Role	Notes
1982	Balloon	Chandu	
1982	Ithu Njangalude Katha	Ramankutty	
1982	Daahikkunnavarude Vazhi		
1983	Pinnilavu	Sabu	
1984	Odaruthammava Aalariyam	Gopan	
1985	Akkare Ninnoru Maran	Pavitran	
1985	Akalathe Ambili	Ashokan	
1985	Boeing Boeing	Anil	
1985	Kaiyum Thalayum Purathidaruthu	Passenger	
1985	Mutharamkunnu P.O.	Dilip Kumar	
1986	Ninnishtam Ennishtam	Ramakrishna Pilla	
1986	Naale Njangalude Vivaham	Unni	
1986	Katturumbinum Kathu Kuthu	Soman	
1986	Kaattuthee		
1986	Adiverukal	Ranger Sunny Varghese	
1986	Koodanayum Kattu	James	
1986	Ennu Nathante Nimmi	Sreeni	
1986	Aalorungi Arangorungi	Vinod	
1986	Atham Chithira Chothy	Rajan	
1986	Ilanjipookal	Rajendran	
1986	Snehamulla Simham	Mohan Menon	
1986	Prathyekam Sradhikuka	Raju	
1986	Kshamichu Ennoru Vakku	Satheesh	
1986	Ithile Iniyum Varu	Ramu	
1986	Dheem Tharikida Thom	Raghavan	
1986	Shyama	Harikumar	
1986	Ayalvasi Oru Daridravasi	Jayan	
1986	Hello My Dear Wrong Number	Jacob	
1986	Onnu Muthal Poojaym Vare	Man at ice cream parlour	Guest appearance
1986	Ashtabandham	Johnny	
1986	Aval Kaathirunnu Avanum		
1986	Ponnum Kudthinu Pottu	College student	
1986	Thalavattam	Hari	
1986	Mazha Peyyunnu Maddalam Kottunnu	Shivan	
1987	Swargam	Gopan	
1987	Yagagni	Chinkan	
1987	Thaniyavarthanam	Gopinathan	
1987	Kurukkan Rajavayi	Prathapan Nair	
1987	Kottum Kuravayum		
1987	Kalam Mari Katha Mari	Yusaf	
1987	Sruthi	Pradeep	
1987	Athinumappuram		
1987	Adimakal Udamakal	Jayan	
1987	Manja Manthrangal	Issac	
1987	Naradhan Keralathil	Narayanan Namboothiri	
1987	Neeyethra Dhanya	Suresh Panicker	
1987	P.C. 369	Johny Vargheese	
1988	1921	Haidrose	
1988	Oru CBI Diary Kurippu	Chacko	
1988	Vicharana	Kabeer	
1988	Theerathinariyumo Thirayude Vedana		
1988	Aparan	George Kutty	
1988	Moonnam Mura	Vinod	
1988	Sangham	Raju	
1988	Oozham	Ravi	
1988	Dinarathrangal	Ajayan	
1989	Mahayanam	Ravi	
1989	Nair Saab	Antony	
1989	Varnatheru		
1989	Jagratha	Chacko	
1989	Aksharathettu	James	
1989	Muthukkudayum Choodi	Rajendran	
1989	Oru Sayahnathinte Swapnam	Roy Mathew	
1989	Ramji Rao Speaking	Gopalakrishnan	
1989	Vandanam	Peter Kaliyikkal	
1989	Ammavanu Pattiya Amali	Suresh	
1989	Mudra	Shashi	
1989	Varnam	Gopan	

==== 1990s ====
Year	Title	Role	Notes
1990	Ee Thanutha Veluppan Kalathu	Ponnan	Cameo Appearance
1990	Akkare Akkare Akkare	Surendran	
1990	Cheriya Lokavum Valiya Manushyarum	Balu	
1990	In Harihar Nagar	Mahadevan	
1990	Kouthuka Varthakal	Mathew Ninan Koshy	
1990	Maalayogam	Jose	
1990	Champion Thomas	Dr. Mathews	
1990	Marupuram	Roy	
1990	Minda Poochakku Kalyanam	Krishnakumar	
1990	Gajakesariyogam	Vinayachandran	
1990	Nanma Niranjavan Srinivasan	Peter	
1990	Ottayal Pattalam	Venu Gopalakrishnan / Col. R. K. Nair	
1990	Thooval Sparsam	Boney	
1991	Bhoomika	Chandikkunju	
1991	Cheppukilukkana Changathi	Nandakumaran Thampi	
1991	Ennathe Programme	Unnikrishnan Nair	
1991	Onnaam Muhoortham	Vishwanathan	
1991	Ezhunnallathu	Dasappan	
1991	Ganamela	Venugopal	
1991	Godfather	Ramabhadran	
1991	Irrikku M.D. Akathundu	Jayan	
1991	Kakkathollayiram	Rajashekharan	
1991	Mookilla Rajyathu	Benny	
1991	Nattu Vishesham	Vinod Kumar	
1991	Parallel College	Balu	
1991	Post Box No. 27	Suresh Kumar	
1991	Ragam Anuragam	Dr. Rajeev	
1991	Souhrudam	Royichan	
1992	Aayushkalam	Balakrishnan	
1992	Kallanum Polisum	Prabhakaran	
1992	Ellarum Chollanu	Ramachandran	
1992	Ennodishtam Koodamo	Ramanunni	
1992	Kaazhchakkppuram	A. Viswanathan	
1992	Makkal Maahathmiam	Madhavankutty	
1992	Manyanmaar	Thomas	
1992	Poochakkaru Mani Kettum	Kochukrishnan	
1993	Sainyam	Zakir	
1993	Thalamura	Mundackal Martin	
1993	Ammayane Sathyam	Omanakuttan	
1993	Bandhukkal Sathrukkal	Chandran a.k.a. Sahayam Chandran Kunju	
1993	Customs Diary	Rony Vincent	
1993	Dollar	Alex	
1993	Ente Sreekuttikku	Appukuttan	
1993	Pravachakan	Balagopalan	
1993	Varam	Actress Mohini	
1994	Kinnaripuzhayoram	Unnikrishnan's Friend	
1994	Varaphalam	Balan	
1994	Malappuram Haji Mahanaya Joji	Jitendra Varma	
1994	Manathe Vellitheru	Babukuttan	
1994	Shudhamaddalam	Appukkuttan	
1995	Achan Rajavu Appan Jethavu	Unnikrishnan / Kunjuvarghese	
1995	Kalamasseriyil Kalyanayogam	Balachandran	
1995	Kalyanji Anandji	Kalyanakrishnan	
1995	Keerthanam	Josekutty	
1995	Manikya Chempazhukka	Ashokan Nair	
1995	Mannar Mathai Speaking	Gopalakrishnan	
1995	Parvathy Parinayam	Shivankutty	
1995	Sipayi Lahala	Rajendran	
1995	Sundari Neeyum Sundaran Njanum	Balakrishnan	
1995	Tom & Jerry	Balagopalan	
1996	Hitler	Mamangalath Balachandran	
1996	Kaanaakkinaavu	Hamsa	Won the Nargis Dutt Award for Best Feature Film on National Integration
1996	Mr. Clean	Rajagopal	
1996	Nandagopaalante Kusruthikal	Nandagopalan	
1997	Chandralekha	Photo Appearance	
1997	Kalyana Kacheri	Ambadi Arjunan Nair	
1997	Kalyanappittennu	Sathyendran	
1997	Mannadiar Penninu Chenkotta Checkan	Chenkotta Sethuraman	
1997	Newspaper Boy	Krishnankutty	
1997	Oru Mutham Mani Mutham	Balachandran	
1997	Suvarna Simhaasanam	Vasudevan	
1997	Vamsam	Kurushinkal Jimmy	
1998	Amma Ammaayiyamma	Shekharankutty	
1998	Chenapparambile Aanakkariyam	Gopikrishnan	
1998	Manthrikumaran	Achuthankutty	
1998	Mattupetti Machan	Mattupetti Machan	
1998	Mayajalam	Valiyachunkatharayil Babu Narayanan Thampi	
1998	Meenakshi Kalyanam	Earali Balan	
1998	Oro Viliyum Kathorthu	Sreedharan	
1998	Sreekrishnapurathe Nakshathrathilakkam	Himself	Cameo appearance
1998	Aakasha Ganga	James	
1999	English Medium	Gokulakrishnan	
1999	Angene Oru Avadhikkalathu	Nandakumar	
1999	Friends	Chandu	
1999	Swastham Grihabharanam	Unni	
1999	Tokyo Nagarile Viseshangal	Chenkalcheri Chandrappan	

==== 2000s ====
Year	Title	Role	Notes
2000	Vakkalathu Narayanankutty	Mathew Chandy	
2000	Nakshathragal Parayathirunnathu	Nandakumar	
2001	Sundara Purushan	Dr.Geevarghese	
2001	Kakkakuyil	Govindan	
2001	One Man Show	Himself as anchor of Kodipathi program	
2002	Pakalppooram	Gouridasan Namboothiri	
2003	Vasanthamalika	Balakrishnan	
2003	Sahodharan Sahadevan	Aravindan, Mukundan	
2003	Chronic Bachelor	Srikumar	
2003	Thillana Thillana	Balachandran	
2004	Sethurama Iyer CBI	Chacko	
2004	Thekkekkara Superfast	Ulahannan	
2004	Vismayathumbathu	Govindan Kutty	
2005	Udayananu Tharam	Babykuttan	
2005	Soumyam		
2005	Boy Friend	Minister Nateshan, Dineshan (double role)	
2005	Nerariyan CBI	Chacko	
2005	Chiratta Kalippattangal		
2005	Junior Senior	Manu	
2005	Oraal	Gautam	
2006	Balram vs Tharadas	Inspector Varma	
2006	Rasathanthram	Shivan	
2007	Athisayan	Radhakrishnan	
2007	Kaiyoppu	Sivadas "Kilippaattu"	
2007	Kaakki	Ramakrishnan	
2007	Katha Parayumbol	Venu	Producer
2007	Naalu Pennungal	Nara Pillai	
2007	Rock N Roll	Vishal	
2007	Ayur Rekha	Thripayar Madhavan	
2007	Vinodayathra	Shaji Raghavan	
2007	Goal	Isaac	
2007	Best Friends		
2008	Twenty:20	CI Jayachandran	
2008	Kabadi Kabadi	Vijayan	
2008	Innathe Chintha Vishayam	Dr. Murali Krishanan	
2008	Parthan Kanda Paralokam	Madhavan	
2008	Gopalapuranam	Vishnu	
2008	SMS	Robert Mathew	
2009	Kanchipurathe Kalyanam	Pattarumadom Najeeb	
2009	2 Harihar Nagar	Mahadevan	Sequel to In Harihar Nagar
2009	Dr.Patient	Dr. Ruben Isaac	
2009	Currency	Danny D'Souza Aka Sayippu	
2009	Bharya Onnu Makkal Moonnu	Gopikrishnan	
2009	Shudharil Shudhan	Mohanachandran Pillai	
2009	Kappal Muthalaali	Venkitt Raman	
2009	Decent Parties	Himself	
2009	Chemistry	Sreekanth IPS	
2009	Calendar	Dr. Roy	
2009	Bharya Swantham Suhruthu	Girish Menon	

==== 2010s ====
Year	Title	Role	Notes
2010	Pathinonnil Vyazham	Appu	
2010	Advocate Lakshmanan Ladies Only	Lakshmanan	
2010	In Ghost House Inn	Mahadevan	Sequel to 2 Harihar Nagar
2010	Cheriya Kallanum Valiya Policum	Sadasivan	
2010	Swantham Bharya Zindabad	Himself	
2010	Mummy & Me	Joseph	
2011	Kottarathil Kutty Bhootham		
2011	Happy Durbar	CID Ananthan	
2011	Killadi Raman	Mahadevan	
2011	Adaminte Makan Abu	Ashraf	
2011	Sarkar Colony	Shivaramakrishnan	
2011	Oru Marubhoomikkadha	Abdu Kupleri	200th film
2011	Maharaja Talkies	Venugopal	
2011	Pachuvum Kovalanum	Pachu	
2011	Ninnishtam Ennishtam 2		
2011	Natakame Ulakam	Omanakuttan	
2012	Gruhanathan	Vishvanathan/ GV	
2012	Masters	SP Ravi Shanker	
2012	Navagatharkku Swagatham	Rajasekharan aka Appettan	
2012	My Boss	Head of the IT firm	
2012	Red Alert		
2012	916	Dr. Ramesh	
2012	Hide N' Seek	Solomon / Niranjan	
2013	Lucky Star	Dr. John Chitillapally	
2013	English: An Autumn in London	Joy	Won the Kerala Film Critics Association Award for Second Best Actor
2013	Sound Thoma	Plapparambil Mathai/Musthafa	
2013	For Sale	Prathapan Guruji	
2013	Ithu Manthramo Thanthramo Kuthanthramo	Sadanantha Bhoopathi Swami	
2013	Philips and the Monkeypen	Principal	
2013	Escape from Uganda	Firoz	
2014	Mannar Mathai Speaking 2	Gopalakrishnan	Sequel to Mannar Mathai Speaking
2014	London Bridge	Francis	
2014	Vasanthathinte Kanal Vazhikalil	Journalist	
2014	Praise The Lord	Sunny	
2014	To Noora With Love		Cameo appearance
2014	Peruchazhi	Francis Kunjappan	
2014	Persiakaran		
2014	Ormayundo Ee Mukham	Doctor	
2014	Mathai Kuzhappakkaranalla	Dr. Nandagopan	
2014	Karanavar		Cameo appearance
2014	To Let Ambadi Talkies	Circle Inspector Jayashankar	
2015	1000 – Oru Note Paranja Katha	Jikku Mon's father	
2015	Kalyanism	Kishore	
2015	Elanjikkavu P.O		
2015	Chandrettan Evideya	Sekharan	
2015	Su Su Sudhi Vathmeekam	Himself	
2015	John Honai	Sreenivasan	
2015	Adi Kapyare Kootamani	Father Alfred Kattuvilayil	Nominated for the Asianet Film Awards for Best Comedian
2015	Two Countries	Simon	
2016	Kattumakkan	Madhavan	
2016	Shikhamani		
2016	Neeranjana Pookal		
2016	Angane Thanne Nethave Anjettennam Pinnale	Paala Thankachan	
2017	Jomonte Suvisheshangal	Vincent	
2017	Ramaleela	Paulson Devassy, DYSP	
2017	Masterpiece	Vice principal Cherian Joseph	250th film
2018	Kalyanam	Sahadevan Nair	
2019	Ganagandharvan	Aby	
2019	Under World	Padmanabhan Nair	

==== 2020s ====
Year	Title	Role	Notes
2020	Dhamaka	Pauly	
2020	2 States	Vijayaraghavan	
2021	Tsunami	Father Sylvester (Achankochapi)	
2021	Mohan Kumar Fans	Prakash	
2021	Marakkar: Arabikadalinte Simham	Dharmoth Panicker	
2022	CBI 5	Chacko	
2023	Oh My Darling	Jacob	
2023	Pachuvum Athbutha Vilakkum	Rajan	
2023	Philip's	Philip Abraham	300th film
2023	Kadhikan	Chandrasenan	
2024	Iyer In Arabia	Srinivasa Iyer	
2024	Super Zindagi	Mujeeb	
2024	Virunnu	John Abraham	
2024	Oru Anweshanathinte Thudakkam	Dysp Prem Kumar	
2025	Mehfil	Mullassery Rajagopal	
2026	Cosmic Samson †	TBA	
2026	Athimanoharam †	TBA	
2026	Pathira Kurukkan †	TBA	
2027	L-Anoop Sathyan Project †	TBA	

=== Tamil films ===
Year	Film	Role	Notes
1990	Manaivi Oru Manickam	Ravi	
1992	Jathi Malli	Kesavan	
2009	Ainthaam Padai	Karunakaran	
2013	Naanum En Jamunavum		

=== As producer ===
- Katha Parayumbol (2007)
- Thattathin Marayathu (2012)

== Television career ==
Year	Title	Role	Channel	Notes
2000	Kodeeswaran	Anchor	Surya TV	
2001	Sambavami Yuge Yuge	Actor	Surya TV	
2008	Super Talent	Anchor	Surya TV	
2009-2012	Deal or No Deal	Anchor	Surya TV	
2013	Abhinethri	Serial Producer	Surya TV	
2013–2018	Badai Bungalow	Co-Host	Asianet	Won, Asianet Television award 2016-Golden Star of the Year; 2nd Asianet Comedy awards -Evergreen hero Asianet Film Awards -Multifaceted talents of the year's Asianet Television Awards 2018- golden star of television
2015	Sell me the answer	Anchor	Asianet	
2016	Sell me the answer season 2	Anchor	Asianet	Won, Asiavision TV awards 2016 -Best game show anchor
2018	Bigg Boss (Malayalam season 1)	Himself (role-Investigator)	Asianet	Episode - 54
2018-2019	Sell me the answer season 3	Anchor	Asianet	
2019–2020	Badai Bungalow season 2	Co-Host	Asianet	
2020	Top Singer	Grand finale Judge	Flowers	
2020–2021	Top Singer season 2	Judge	Flowers	
2020	Engane oru Bharyayum Bharthavum	Judge	Flowers	
2020	Chankanu Chackochan	Himself	Asianet	Christmas special program
2020	Utsavam With Lalettan	Himself	Flowers	Christmas special program
2020	Nammal Thammil	Host	Asianet	
2021	Comedy Stars Season 2	Special Judge	Asianet	
2021	Star Magic	Mentor	Flowers	
2021	Oru Chiri Iru Chiri Bumper Chiri	Judge	Mazhavil Manorama	
2021	Kanyadaanam	Narrator	Surya TV	
2021	Minnum Tharam Season 2	Judge	Asianet	
2021	Madhuram Shobhanam	Himself	Zee Keralam	
2021–2022	Mukesh Speaking	Host	YouTube	Online show
2021–2022	Comedy Stars Season 3	Judge	Asianet	
2022–2023	Kidilam	Judge	Mazhavil Manorama	
2023	Uppum Mulakum	Philips	Flowers TV	One episode for movie promotion

=== Radio anchor ===
- Laksham Laksham Pinnale (2013) (Reality show-Super 94.7 fm)

=== Theater performance ===
- Mukesh started Kalidasa Visual Magic for play productions. His first play Chayamukhi was in 2008 with Mohanlal and was written and directed by Prasanth Narayanan. He also appeared with his sister, Sandhya Rajendan and his wife Methil in the 2015 adaptation of Naaga, directed by Suveeran.
