= O. Madhavan =

Indian actor

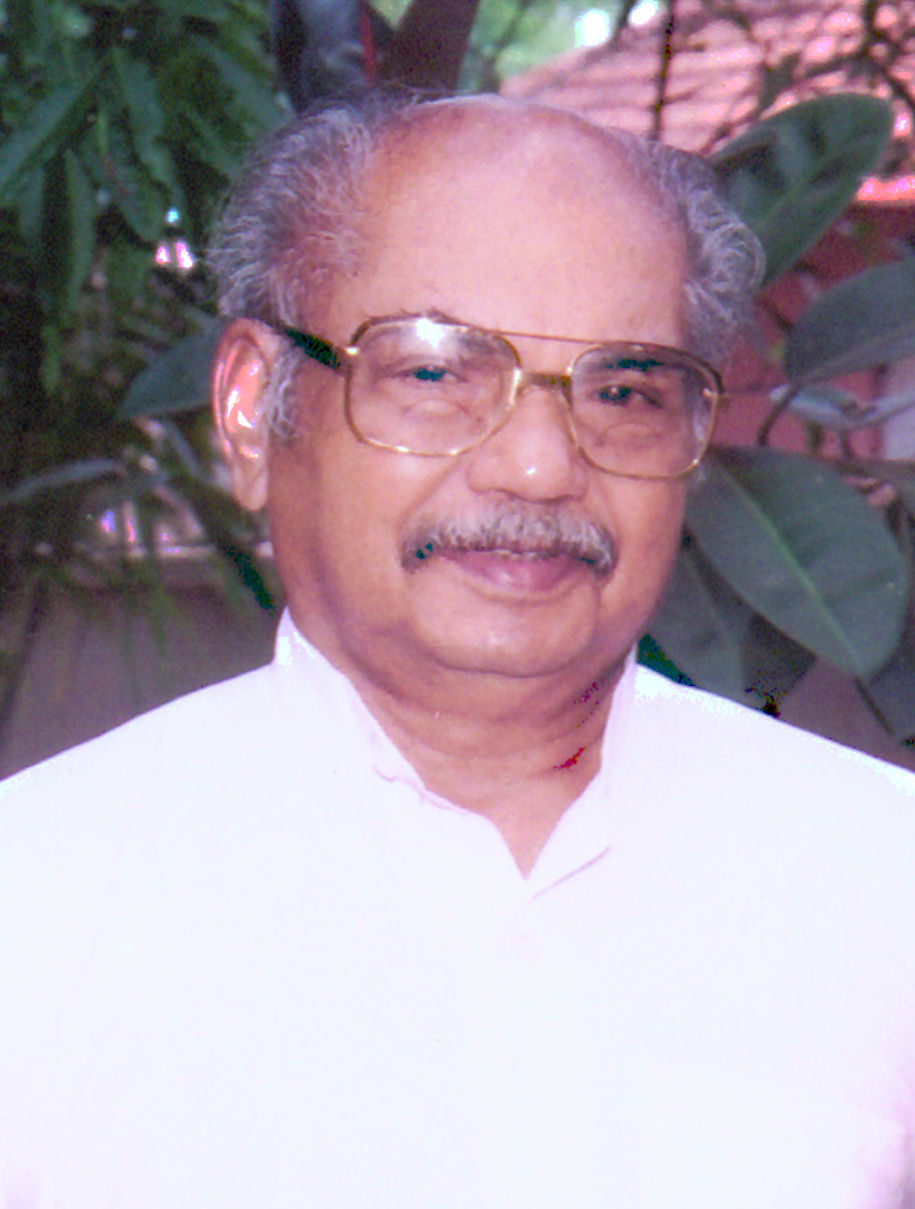
- Born: O. Madhavan; 27 January 1922; Chunakkara, Kingdom of Travancore, British India (present day Alappuzha, Kerala, India)
- Died: 19 August 2005 (aged 83); Kollam, Kerala, India
- Occupation: Artist
- Political party: Communist Party of India
- Spouse: Vijayakumari
- Children: 3; including Mukesh
- Relatives: Divyadarsan R. Engoor (grandson)
- Awards: Kerala State Film Award for Best Actor; Sayahnam (2000)

O. Madhavan (27 January 1922 – 19 August 2005) was an Indian theatre director and actor. He was one of the founding members of the Communist Party of India in Kerala. He is considered one of the great masters of the theatre; he has made major contributions for the evolution of theatre in Kerala. He was the founder of the renowned drama company Kalidasa Kala Kendram. He won the Kerala State Film Award for Best Actor in 2000 for his role in the film Sayahnam.

== Early life and family ==
He was active in the Communist Party at an early age. He married, Vijayakumari, is an actress herself which was an intercaste love marriage and his son Mukesh is an actor. He also has two daughters, Sandhya Rajendran and Jayasree Syamlal. Sandhya's husband, E. A. Rajendran is also an actor. He has 5 grandchildren, Shravan Mukesh, Thejas Mukesh, Divya Darshan R. Engoor, Neetha Syam and Nathalia Syam.

== Awards ==
- 1982: Kerala Sangeetha Nataka Akademi Award
- 1996: Kerala Sangeetha Nataka Akademi Fellowship
- 2000: Kerala State Film Award for Best Actor - Sayahnam

== Filmography ==
1. Kalam Marunnu (1955)
2. Viyarppinte Vila (1962)
3. Doctor (1963).... Venu
4. Kattupookkal (1965) .... Lonachan
5. Oru Sundariyude Kadha (1972)
6. Sayahnam (2000)
