= Eravipuram Assembly constituency =

Constituency of the Kerala legislative assembly in India

Eravipuram
- Constituency No. 125 for the Kerala Legislative Assembly
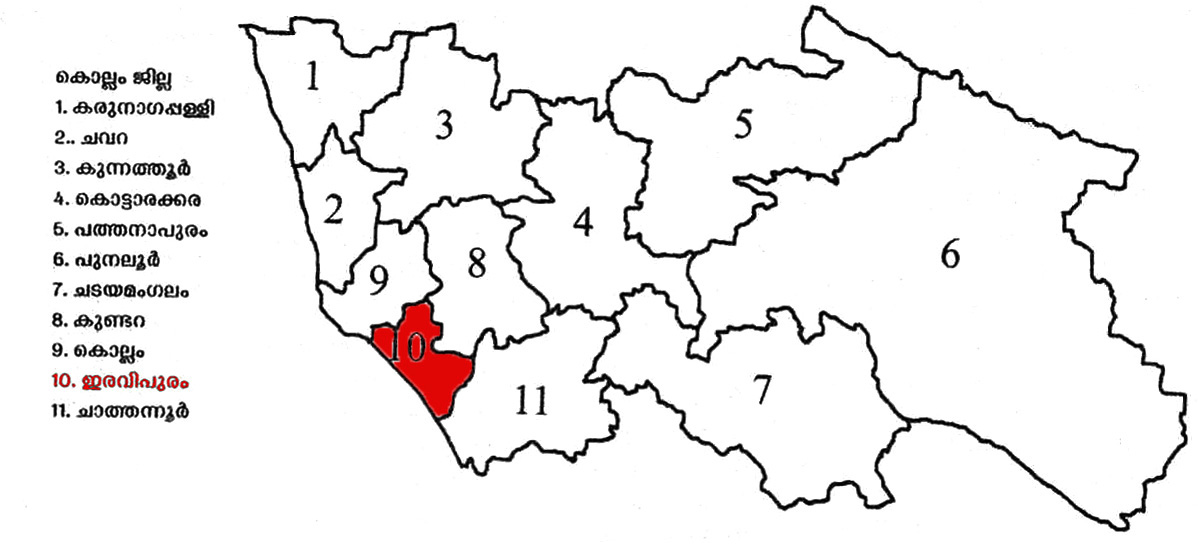
- Eravipuram constituency in Kollam district

Constituency details
- Country: India
- Region: South India
- State: Kerala
- District: Kollam
- Established: 1957
- Total electors: 1,70,253 (2016)
- Reservation: None

Member of Legislative Assembly
- 16th Kerala Legislative Assembly
- Incumbent Vishnu Mohan
- Party: RSP
- Alliance: UDF
- Elected year: 2026

Eravipuram is a legislative assembly constituency in the southern coastal area of Kollam district in Kerala, India. It is one among the eleven Assembly constituencies in the district. As of the 2026 assembly elections, the current MLA is Advocate Vishnu Mohan.

== Structure ==
As per the recent changes on Assembly constituency delimitations, Eravipuram Assembly constituency consists of the 24 wards from Kollam Municipal Corporation (Asramam, Uliyakovil, Mangadu, Arunoottimangalam, Chathinamkulam, Karicode, College Division, Palkulangara, Ammannada, Vadakkevila, Pallimukku, Ayathil, Kilikollur, Punthalathazham, Palathara, Manakkadu, Kollurvila, Kayyalakkal, Valathungal, Akkolil, Thekkumbhagam, Eravipuram, Bharanikkavu, Thekkevila) and neighbouring Mayyanad panchayath in Kollam Taluk.

== Members of Legislative Assembly ==
Year	Member	Political party
Travancore-Cochin
1951	C. Kesavan	Indian National Congress
1954	Chandrasekharan	Revolutionary Socialist Party
1954	Sukumaran	Communist Party of India
Kerala
1957	P. Ravindran	Communist Party of India
1960	P. Ravindran	Communist Party of India
1967	R. S. Unni	Independent politician
1970	R. S. Unni	Revolutionary Socialist Party
1977	R. S. Unni	Revolutionary Socialist Party
1980	R. S. Unni	Revolutionary Socialist Party
1982	R. S. Unni	Revolutionary Socialist Party
1987	V. P. Ramakrishna Pillai	Revolutionary Socialist Party
1991	P. K. K. Bava	Indian Union Muslim League
1996	V. P. Ramakrishna Pillai	Revolutionary Socialist Party
2001	A. A. Aziz	Revolutionary Socialist Party
2006	A. A. Aziz	Revolutionary Socialist Party
2011	A. A. Aziz	Revolutionary Socialist Party
2016	M. Noushad	Communist Party of India (Marxist)
2021	M. Noushad	Communist Party of India (Marxist)
2026	Adv. Vishnu Mohan	Revolutionary Socialist Party

== Election results ==
Percentage change (±%) denotes the change in the number of votes from the immediate previous election.

=== 2026 ===
2026 Kerala Legislative Assembly election: Eravipuram
Party	Candidate	Votes	%	±%
RSP	Vishnu Mohan	64,383	48.63	▲14.23
CPI(M)	M. Noushad	55,580	41.98	▼14.72
BDJS	Saji D. Anand	10,469	7.91	▲1.21
NOTA	None of the above	912	0.69	
Independent	Firoz S R	597	0.45	
Independent	Noushad A	443	0.33	
Margin of victory		8,803	6.65	▼15.65
Turnout		1,32,384		
RSP gain from CPI(M)		Swing		

=== 2021 ===
There were 1,70,142 registered voters in the constituency for the 2021 Kerala Assembly election.

2021 Kerala Legislative Assembly election: Eravipuram
Party	Candidate	Votes	%	±%
CPI(M)	M. Noushad	71,573	56.7	▲4.37
RSP	Babu Divakaran	43,452	34.4	▲5.12
BDJS	Renjith Ravindran	8,468	6.7	▼9.0
Margin of victory		28,121	22.3	▼0.75
Turnout		1,26,310	74.8	▲1.4
CPI(M) hold		Swing		

=== 2016 ===
There were 1,70,253 registered voters in the constituency for the 2016 Kerala Assembly election.

2016 Kerala Legislative Assembly election: Eravipuram
Party	Candidate	Votes	%	±%
CPI(M)	M. Noushad	65,392	52.33	
RSP	A. A. Azeez	36,589	29.28	▼19.72
BDJS	Akkavila Satheek	19,714	15.77	
SDPI	Ayathil Razak	988	0.79	
NOTA	None of the above	950	0.76	
PDP	Muhammed Ismail	643	0.51	
Independent	Manoj	463	0.37	
SUCI(C)	Vinod B.	232	0.19	
Margin of victory		28,803	23.05	
Turnout		1,24,971	73.40	▲5.26
CPI(M) gain from RSP		Swing		

=== 2011 ===
There were 1,53,575 registered voters in the constituency for the 2011 election.

2011 Kerala Legislative Assembly election: Eravipuram
Party	Candidate	Votes	%	±%
RSP	A. A. Azeez	51,271	49.00	
IUML	P. K. K. Bava	43,259	41.34	
BJP	Pattathanam Babu	5,048	4.82	
Independent	Mylakkad Shah	3,234	3.09	
BSP	Sushama Vijayan	580	0.55	
Independent	Abdul Azeez	552	0.53	
Independent	Saiju V.	391	0.37	
Independent	Deepu N.	310	0.30	
Margin of victory		8,012	7.66	
Turnout		1,04,645	68.14	
RSP hold		Swing		
