= Vishnu Mohan (politician) =

Indian politician (born 1987)

Adv.Vishnu Mohan

Member of the Kerala Legislative Assembly
- Incumbent
- Assumed office 2026
- Preceded by: M. Noushad
- Constituency: Eravipuram

State Secretary, Revolutionary Youth Front
- Incumbent
- Assumed office 2026

Personal details
- Born: 1987 (age 38–39)
- Party: Revolutionary Socialist Party; United Democratic Front
- Profession: Politician

Adv. Vishnu Mohan (born 1987) is an Indian politician from Kerala. He is a member of the Kerala Legislative Assembly from Eravipuram representing the Revolutionary Socialist Party (India) as part of the United Democratic Front.

== Early life and education ==
Vishnu Mohan is the son of Mohana Kurup. He is an advocate and is associated with social service activities. He completed a Bachelor of Laws degree from Government Law College, Thiruvananthapuram, in 2012.

== Political career ==
Vishnu Mohan won the Eravipuram seat in the 2026 Kerala Legislative Assembly election as a candidate of the Revolutionary Socialist Party (India). He received 64,383 votes and defeated M. Noushad of the Communist Party of India (Marxist) by a margin of 8,803 votes.
