= RYF =

RYF may refer to:

- Raise Your Flag, a song for the homecoming of Miss Universe 2018 Catriona Gray, sung by KZ Tandingan ft. Kritiko
- Revolutionary Youth Front, an Indian socialist organization
- Respects Your Freedom hardware certification
- Ryf (surname)
