= Punthalathazham =

Punthalathazham Punthalathaazham
- Neighbourhood
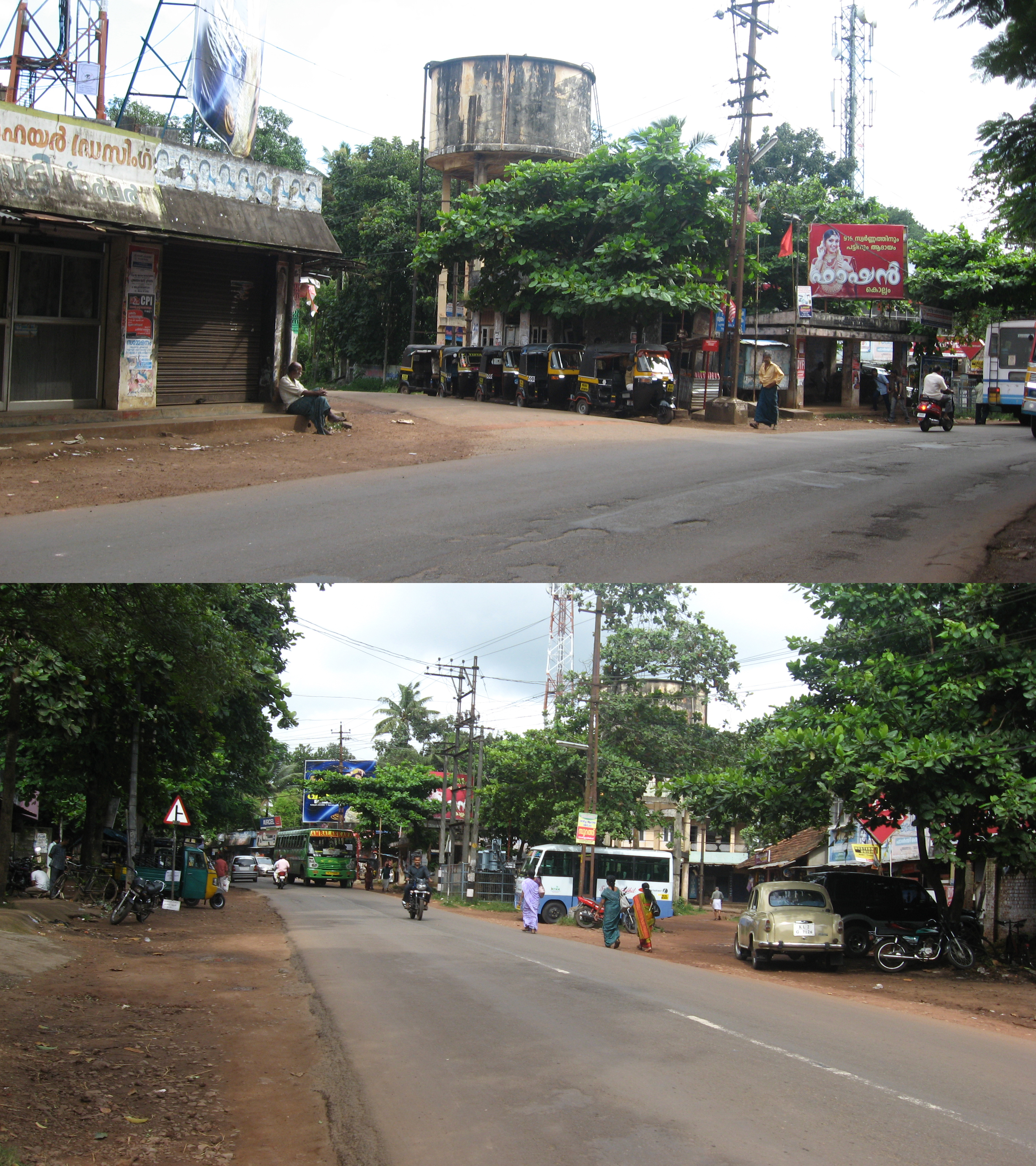
- Punthalathazham Junction in 2011, seen from east (top) and west (bottom)
- Interactive map of Punthalathazham
- Coordinates: 8°53′43″N 76°38′21″E
- Country: India
- State: Kerala
- District: Kollam

Government
  - Type: Municipal corporation
  - Body: Kollam Municipal Corporation(KMC)

Languages
  - Official: Malayalam, English
- Time zone: UTC+5:30 (IST)
- PIN: 691004
- Telephone code: 0474
- Vehicle registration: KL-02
- Nearest city: Chinnakkada
- Lok Sabha constituency: Kollam
- Civic agency: Kollam Corporation
- Climate: Min 22.4 °C - Max 36 °C (Köppen)

Punthalathazham is a landlocked neighbourhood of the city of Kollam in the Indian state of Kerala, around six kilometres east of the city centre.

Punthalathazham is in Kollam Taluk and comes under Vadakkevila Village having a population under 5000.

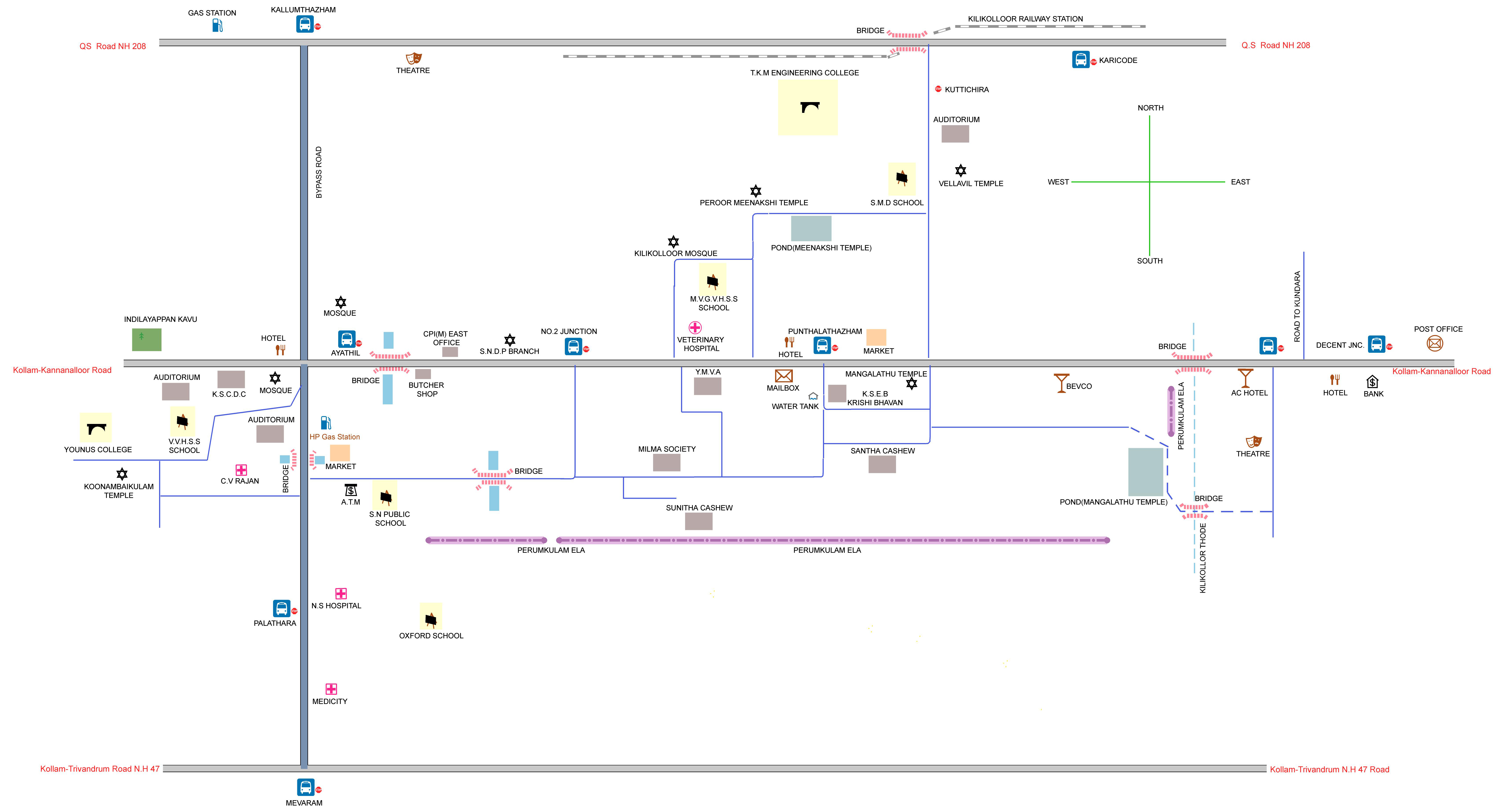
Road Map of Punthalathazham

== Climate ==
Punthalathazham has a moderate climate, with heavy rains during June–August due to the southwest monsoon. Winter starts from December and continues until February. In summer, the temperature rises to a maximum of 35 °C and 25 °C in the winters. Annual average rainfall is 310 cm.

== Politics ==
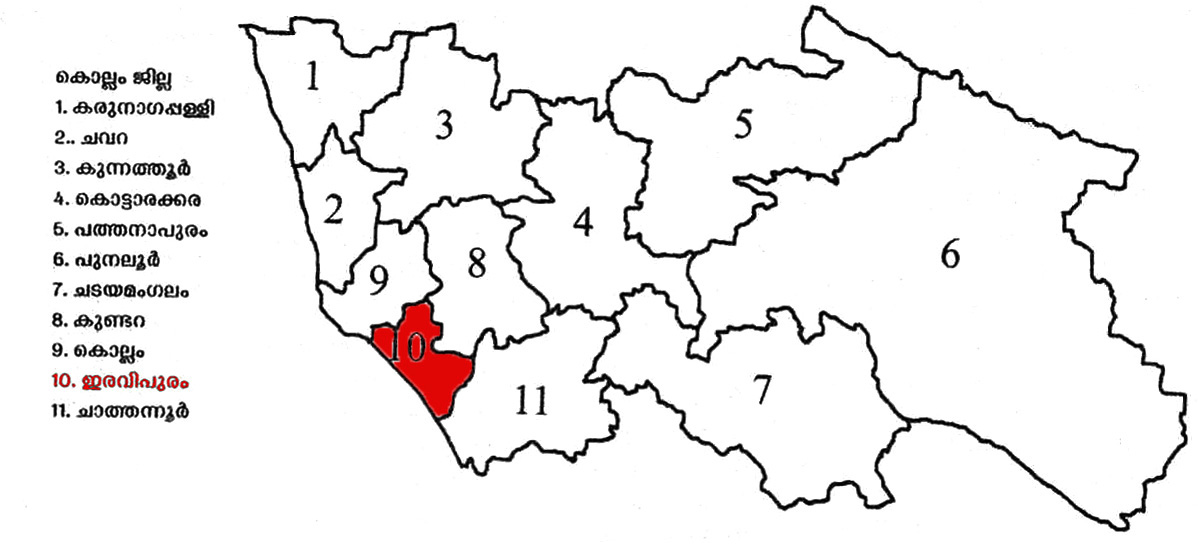
Eravipuram constituency in Kollam district

Sl.no	Winner	Constituency	Position Held	In Office	Political Party	Front
1	N. Peethambara Kurup	Kollam Lok Sabha	MP	2009-2014	INC	UDF
2	A. A. Aziz	Eravipuram LAC	MLA	2011-2016	RSP	LDF
3	S.Bindu	Kollam Corporation	Councillor	2010-2015	INC	UDF
4	N.K. Premachandran	Kollam Lok Sabha	MP	2014-Incumbent	RSP	UDF
5	Satheesh.S	Kollam Corporation	Councillor	2015-2020	CPI	LDF
6	M. Noushad	Eravipuram LAC	MLA	2016-Incumbent	CPI(M)	LDF
7	V.Priji	Kollam Corporation	Councillor	2020-Incumbent	CPI	LDF

== Gallery ==
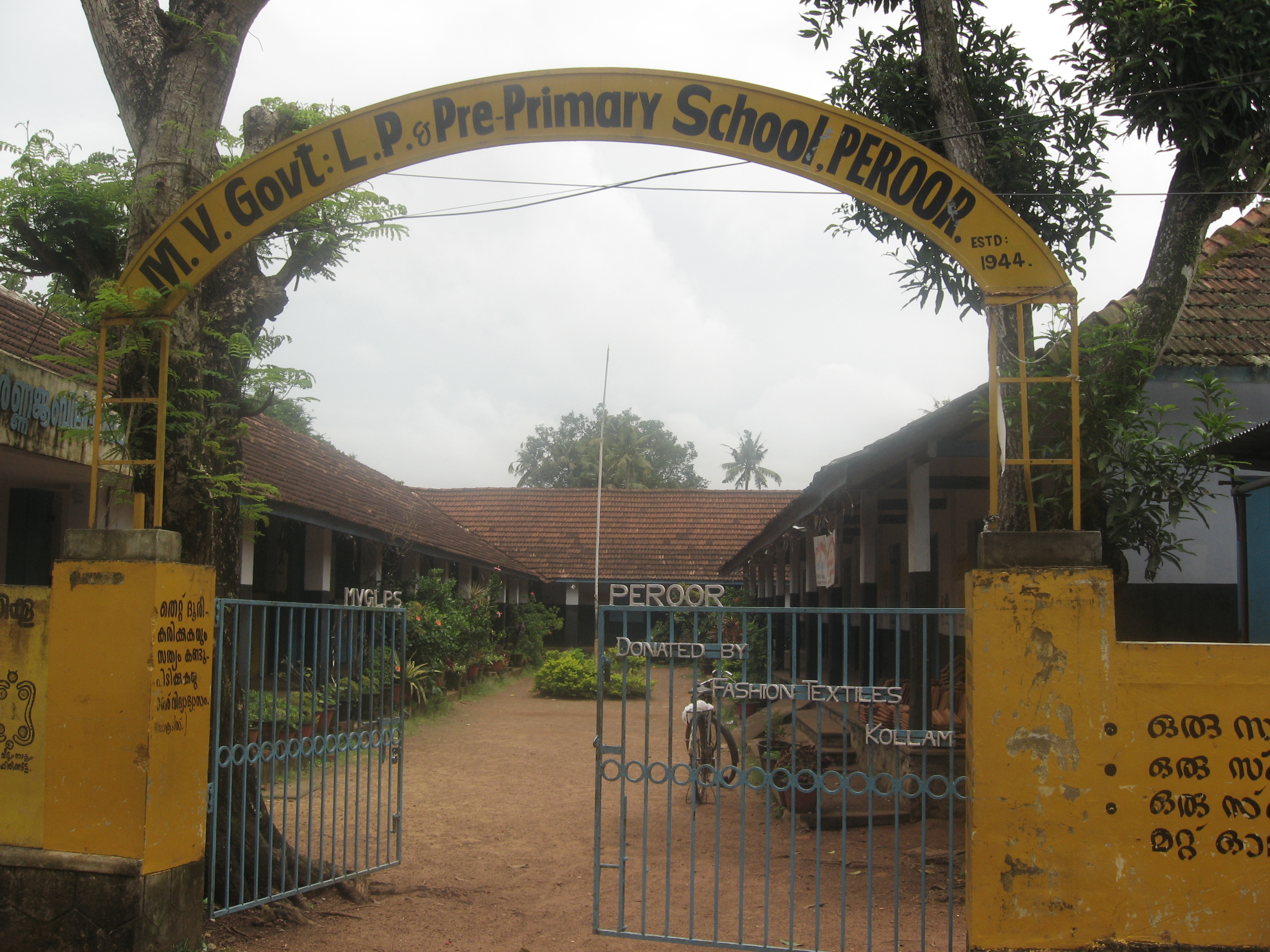
M.V.Govt:L.P School

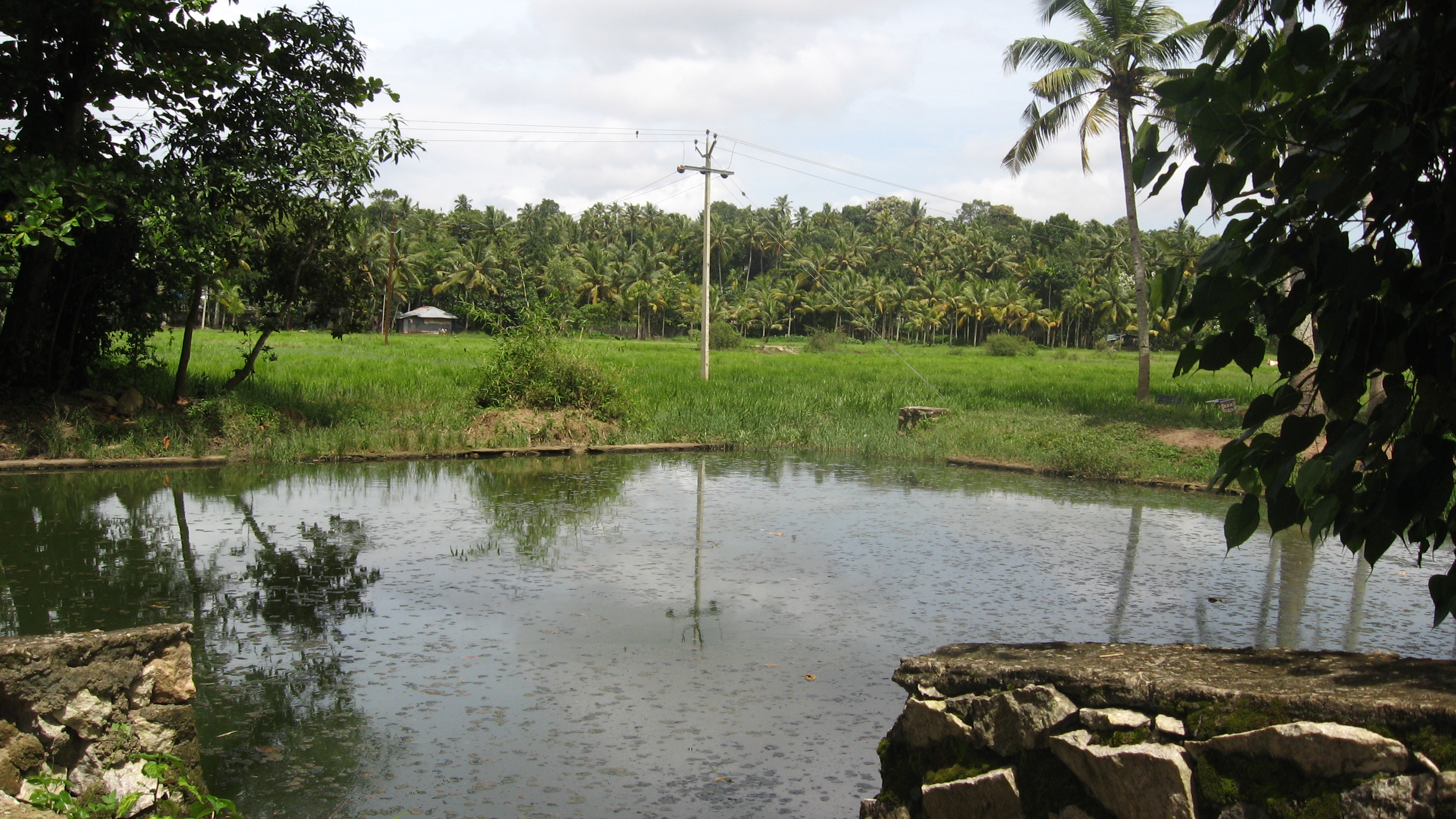
View of Perumkulam Ela close to Mangalathu temple Pond

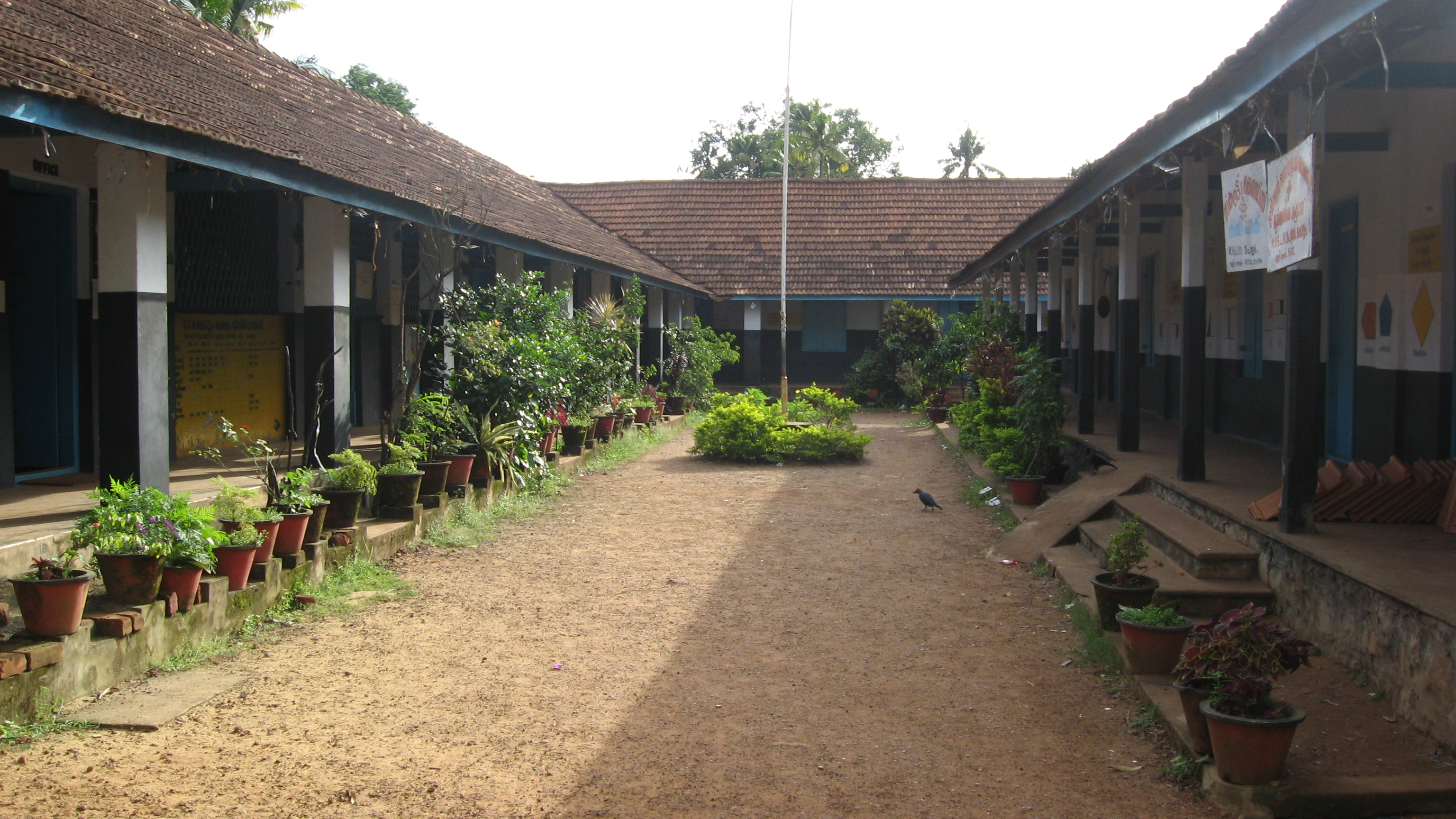
M.V.Govt:L.P School, Peroor

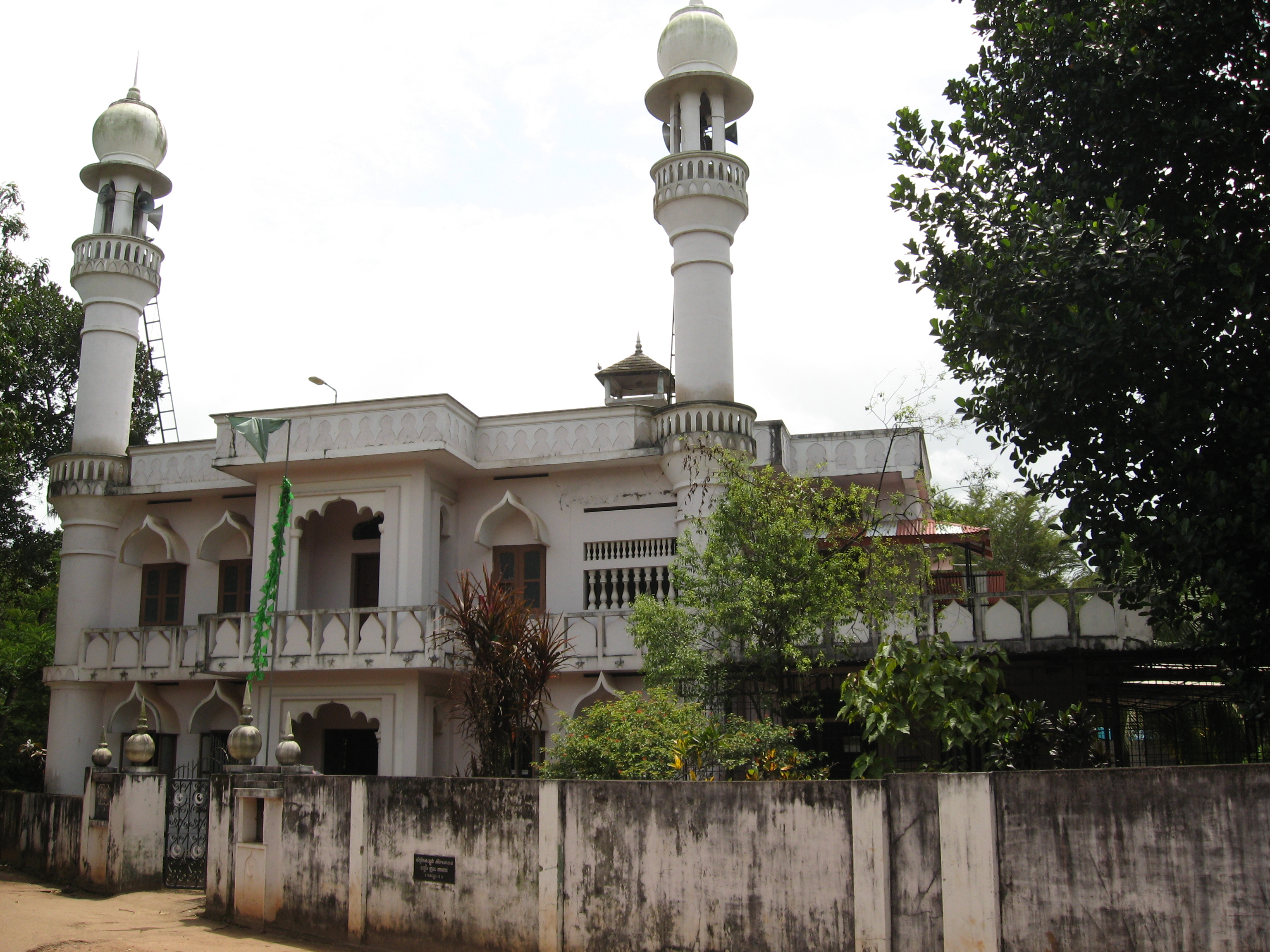
Kilikolloor Kizhakkekara Muslim Jama-Ath (Kattavila palli)

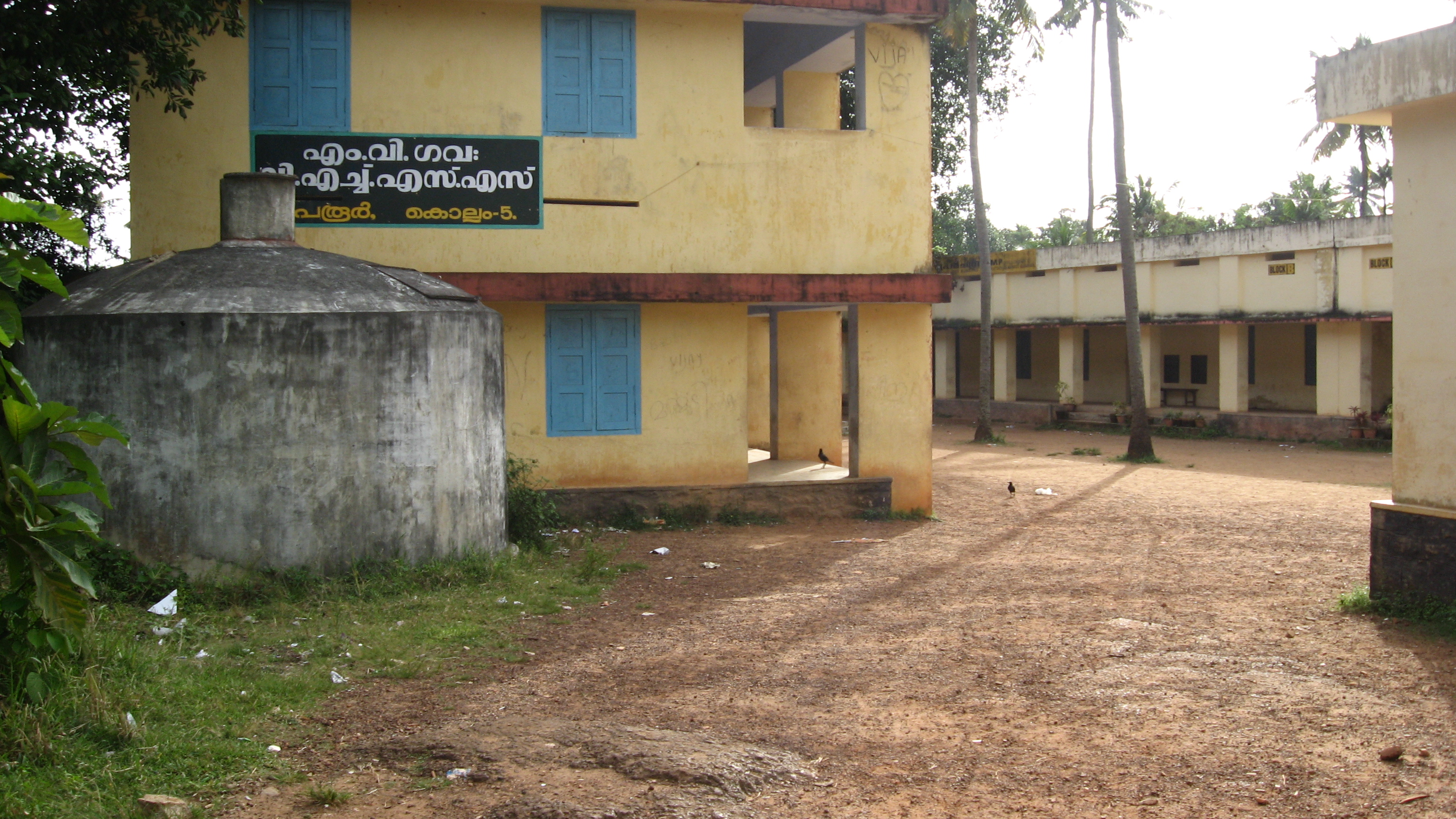
M V Govt Vocational Higher Secondary School, Peroor

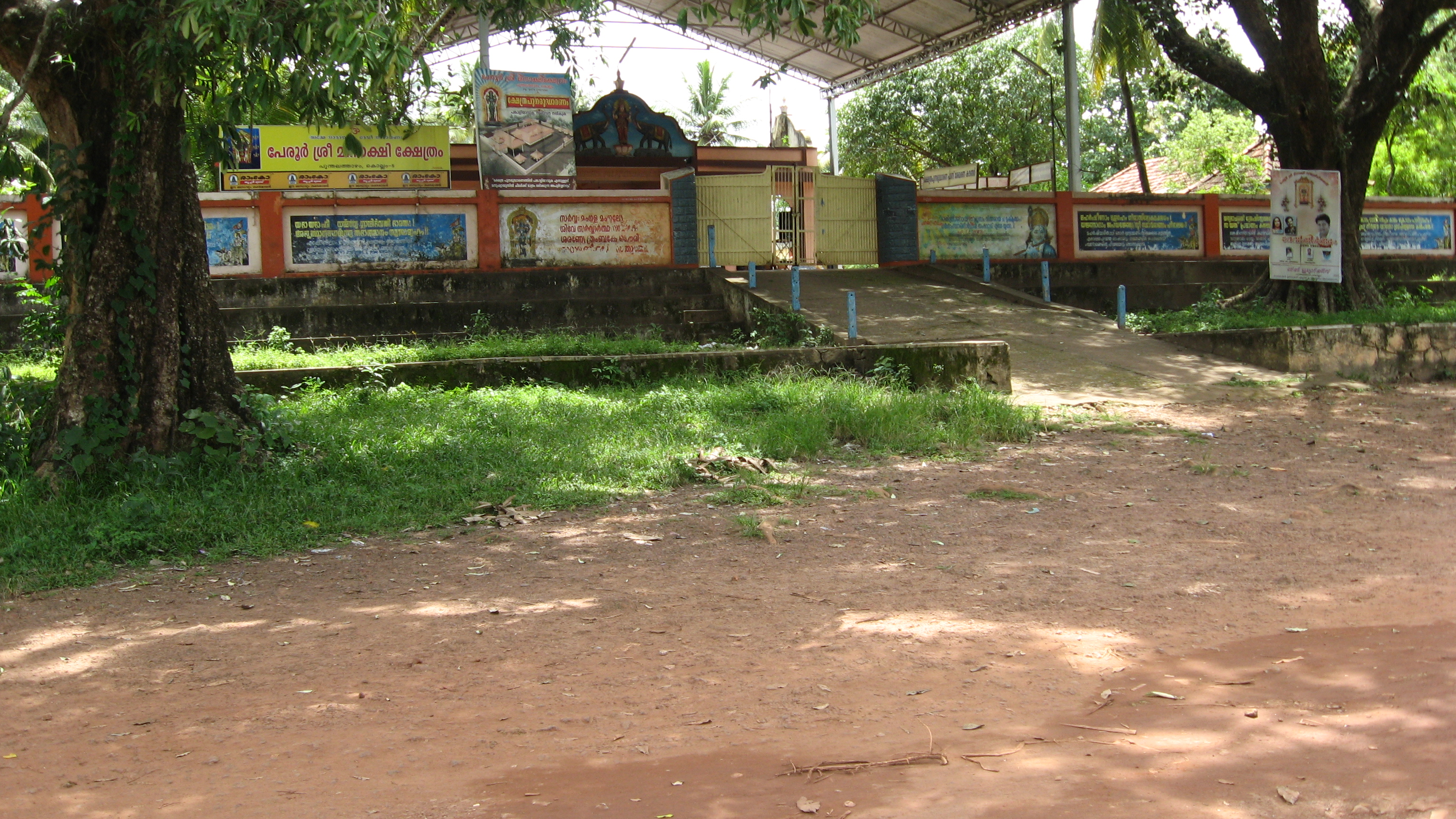
Peroor Sree Meenakshi temple

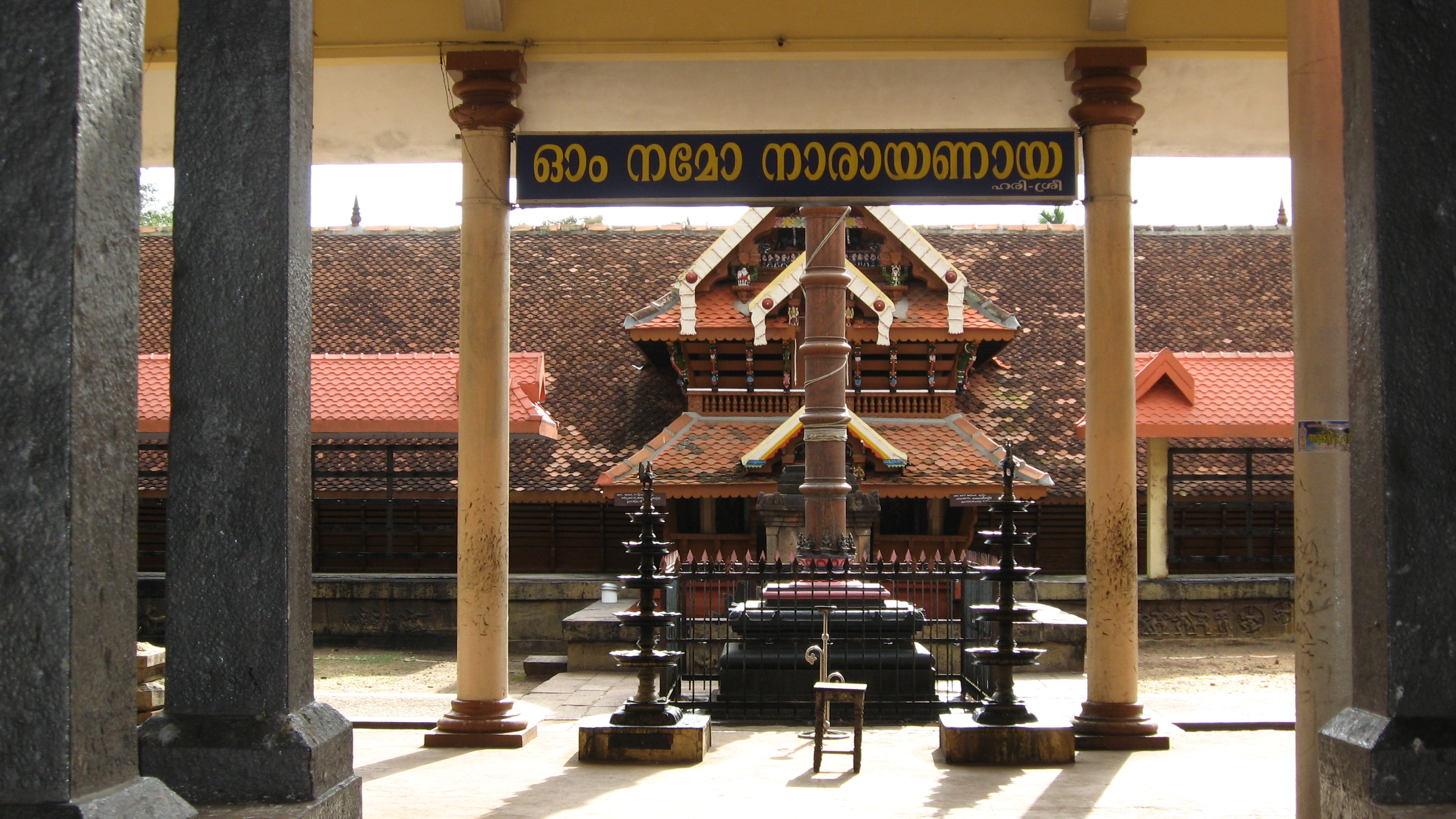
Mukhathala Murari

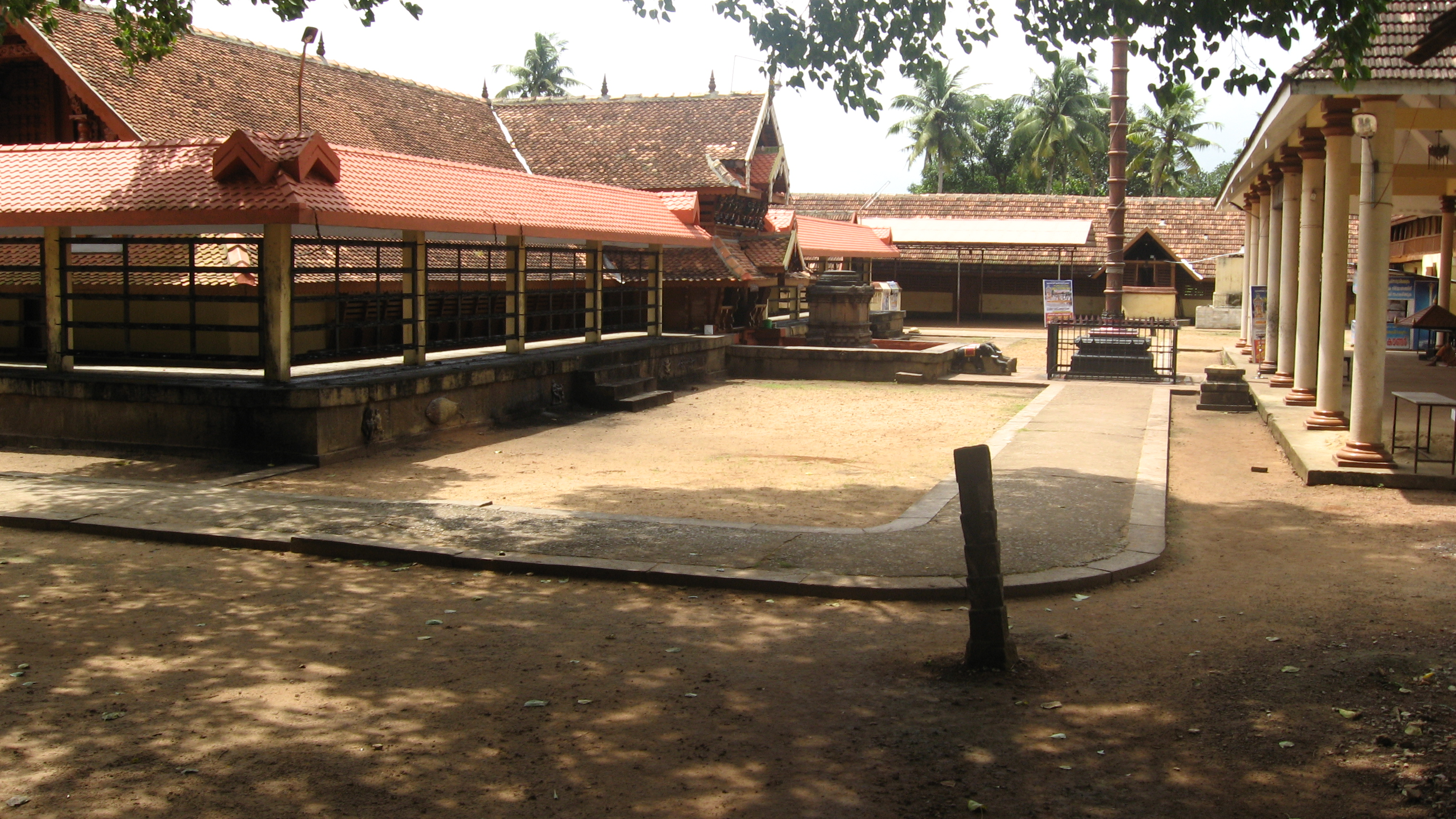
Mukathala Murari (SreeKrishna)Temple

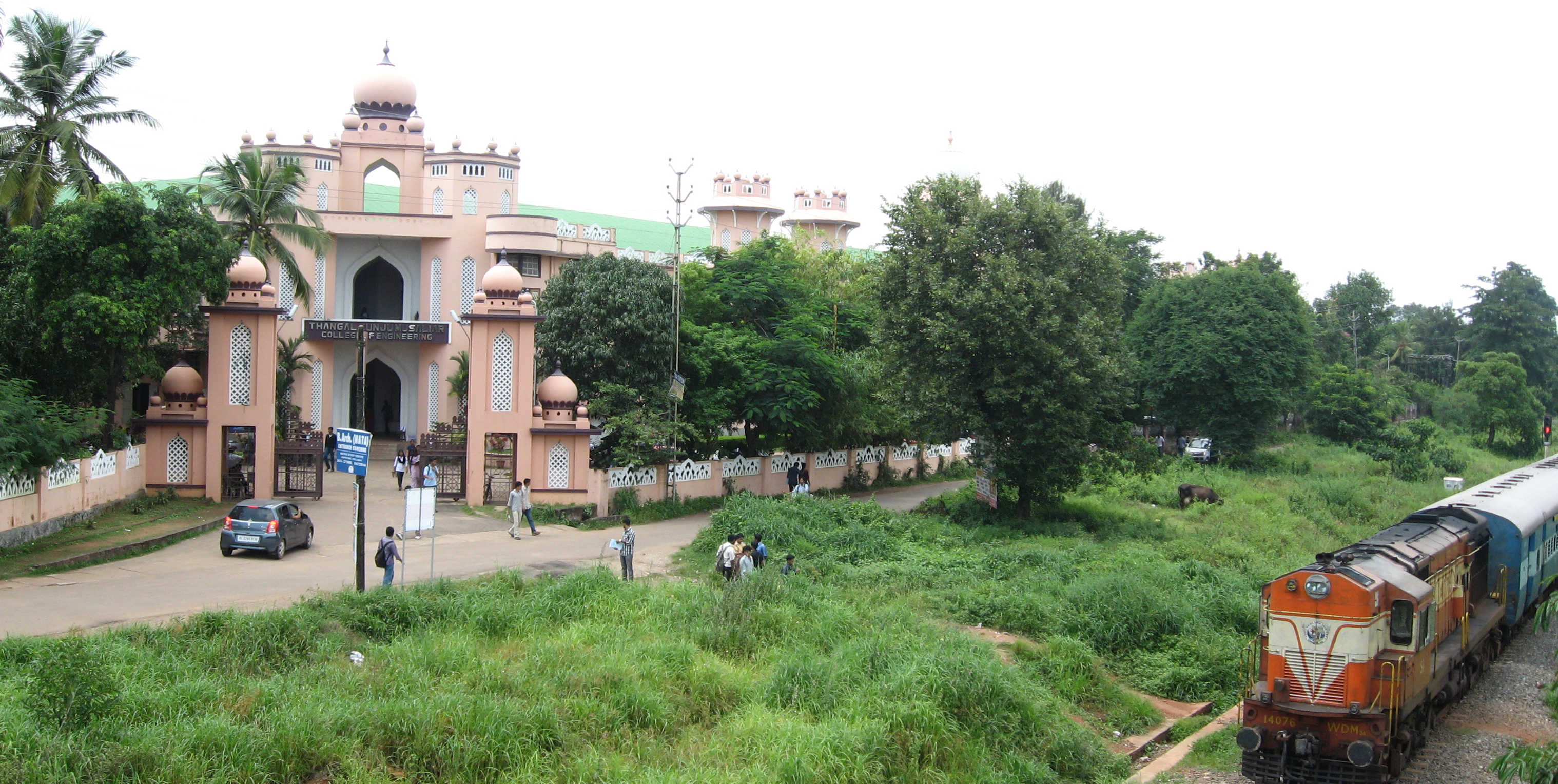
View of Kollam-Punalur Passenger Train passing by the T.K.M Engineering College.

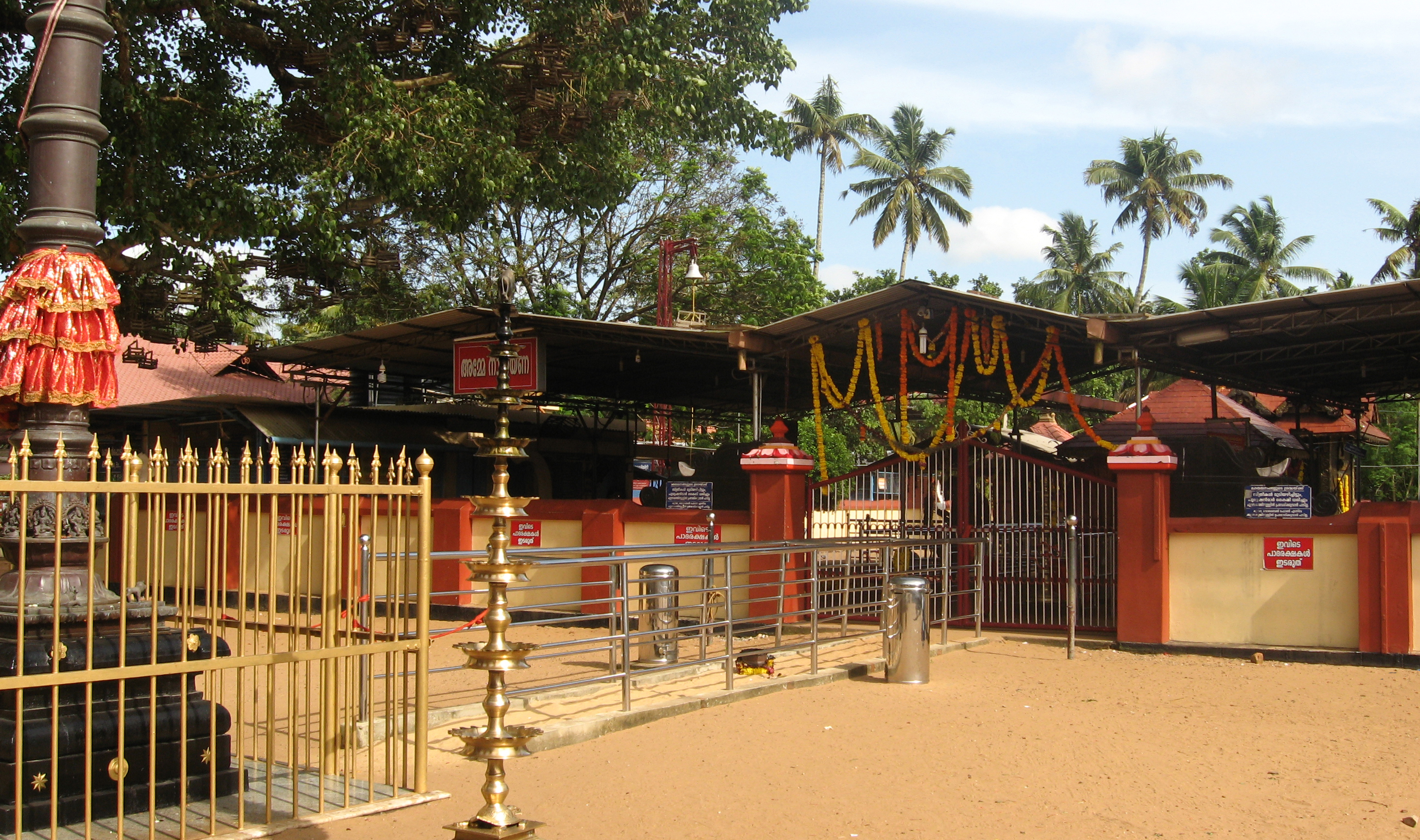
Vadakkevila Koonambaikulam Temple
