= A. A. Aziz =

Indian politician

- എ. എ. അസീസ്
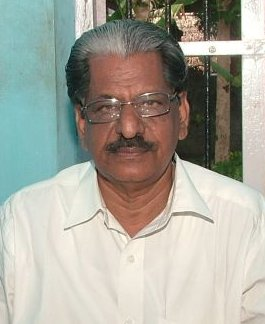

Member of Legislative Assembly, Kerala
- In office 2001–2016
- Preceded by: V. P. Ramakrishna Pillai
- Succeeded by: M. Noushad
- Constituency: Eravipuram

Personal details
- Born: 14 August 1941 Umayanallur, Kollam, Travancore
- Party: Revolutionary Socialist Party

A. A. Aziz is an Indian politician, belonging to the Revolutionary Socialist Party (RSP). He was a MLA from Eravipuram for the 11th, 12th and 13th Niyamasabha, representing Eravipuram. In March 2012 he was unanimously elected secretary of the Kerala State Committee of RSP.
