= V. P. Ramakrishna Pillai =

Indian politician (1931–2016)

V. P. Ramakrishna Pillai (12 November 1931 – 8 November 2016) was an Indian politician, belonging to the Revolutionary Socialist Party (RSP).

== RSP leader ==
V. P. Krishna Pillai is the son of Parameswaran Pillai. He hailed from Kollam. He was active in student movement and joined the Kerala Socialist Party. Later he became a RSP member. V. P. Krishna Pillai held the post as Kollam District Committee secretary of RSP. He has served as member of the National Committee and Kerala State Secretariat of RSP, and edited the party fortnightly Pravaham. Other posts held by him include director of the Kerala State Co-operative Bank, the Kerala State Warehousing Corporation and the Kerala State Coir Marketing Federation. He has led different trade unions affiliated to the United Trade Union Congress.

== Legislator ==
He was elected to the Kerala Legislative Assembly in the 1987 election, standing as the RSP candidate in the Eravipuram constituency. He obtained 53,318 votes (49.80%). He lost the seat in 1991, standing as an independent candidate. He finished in second place with 55,350 votes (47.67%). He regained the Eravipuram seat in 1996, standing as a RSP candidate again. He obtained 53,344 votes (46.42%).

== Minister ==
He served as Minister of Irrigation and Labour of the Kerala state government between 7 January 1998 and 13 May 2001. He contested the Chavara seat in the 2001 Kerala Legislative Assembly election, but lost to Revolutionary Socialist Party (Bolshevik) candidate Shibu Baby John. V. P. Ramakrishna Pillai finished in second place, with 48,206 votes (42.64%).

== RSP Kerala Secretary ==
He was elected secretary of the RSP Kerala State Committee in January 2008, defeating the incumbent T.J. Chandrachoodan.

In April 2010 he was internally criticized in the RSP following a television interview in which he had stated that the Left Democratic Front would not be able to win the upcoming assembly elections. The state secretariat of the party decided to impose a ban on him interacting with news media. V. P. Ramakrishna Pillai stepped down as RSP Kerala State Committee secretary in March 2012, following the meagre result for RSP in the 2011 Kerala Legislative Assembly election and the failure of the party to obtain a Rajya Sabha seat from Kerala. Initially V. P. Ramakrishna Pillai had hinted that he was not ready to step down, but in the end he decided not to contest and A.A. Aziz was elected unanimously as the new party state secretary.
