= Progressive Students' Union =

Revolutionary Socialist Party student group

P S U (Progressive Students Union)
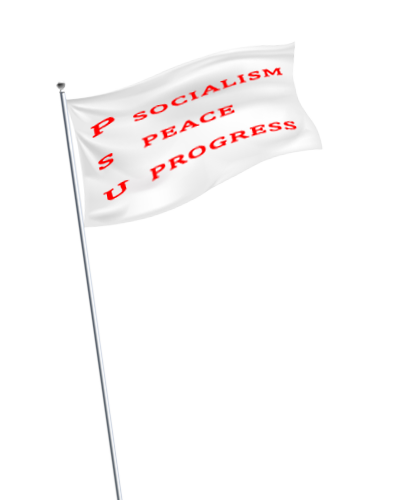
- Progressive Students Union (PSU)
- Type: Student Organisation
- Headquarters: No 40 Canning Lane New Delhi
- Region served: India
- All India General Secretary: Balaram Sajeev
- National President: Nowfall MD safiulla
- West Bangal state Secretary: Debjyoti Das (Raja)

The P S U (Progressive Students Union) is a student organisation of Revolutionary Socialist Party (RSP). The organisation was founded after 1940. In October 1949, the Kerala Socialist Party passed through a split. A section of its cadres, like N. Sreekandan Nair, Baby John and K. Balakrishnan, joined RSP and built a branch of the party in Kerala. Former minister Shri V P Ramakrishna Pilla was the First President of PSU in Kerala. Headquarters 40 Pt Ravishankar Shukla Lane (Canning Line), Firoz Shah Road, New Delhi. WB state office, 47 Suriya Sen Street. Kol- 700009,Progressive Students Union (PSU) is the student organization of the political party RSP.

The organization is based on Socialist ideology.

== See also ==
- List of political parties in India
