= Udbastu Adhikar Raksha Samity =

The Udbastu Adhikar Raksha Samity ('Refugee Rights Protection Association') was a refugee organization in Tripura, India, led by the Revolutionary Socialist Party, which existed during the 1950s. The organization criticized the refugee policies of the Congress government for not implementing a planned refugee Rehabilitation Policy, and that this had contributed to the misery of the refugees. The organization demanded a loan system with low rates to refugees and distribution of agricultural lands to them.
