= M. Noushad =

Indian politician

M. Noushad MLA
- എം. നൗഷാദ്
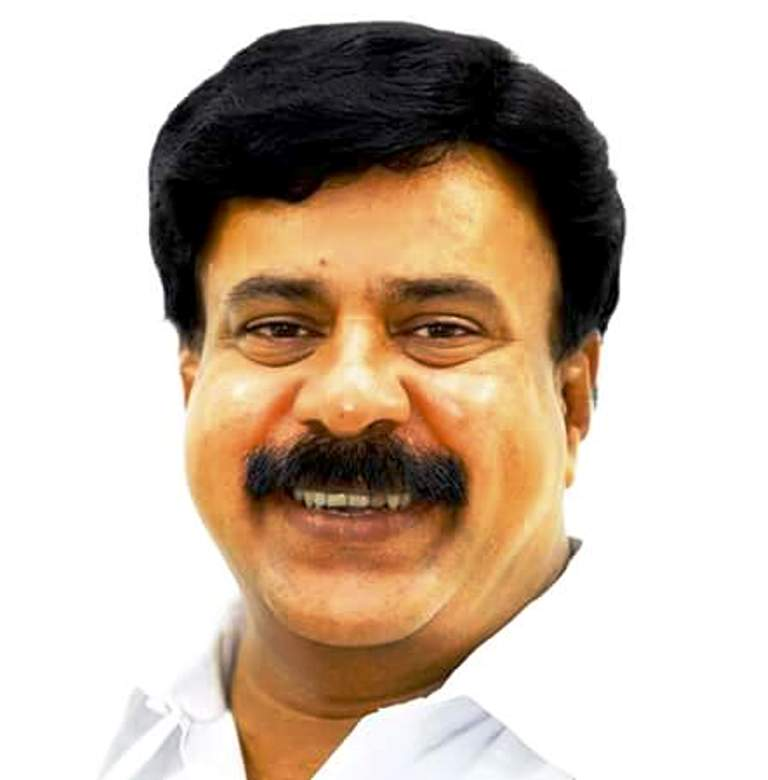
- Born: 22 February 1965 (age 61); Kollam district, Kerala, India
- Education: Pre-Degree from Kerala University
- Occupations: Politician, Social worker
- Political party: Communist Party of India (Marxist)
- Spouse: Benni mol
- Children: Irfan, Sharoon
- Parents: Muhammed Haneefa (father); Khadeeja Beevi (mother)
- Relatives: Razi, Nousher
- Family: Thengazhikathu Veedu

M. Noushad (born 22 February 1965) is an Indian politician and member of the fourteenth Kerala Legislative Assembly representing Eravipuram constituency in Kollam district of Kerala. He belongs to the Communist Party of India (Marxist) (CPI(M)) and a member of its Kollam east area committee. He served as the Vadakkevila Panchayat Vice President, Deputy Mayor of Kollam Municipal Corporation from July 2014 to October 2015. Representing as an CPI(M) candidate from Eravipuram he contested in the 2016 Kerala Legislative Assembly Election and defeated A. A. Aziz, the state secretary of the Revolutionary Socialist Party by a margin of 28,803 votes and became the first CPI(M) MLA from Eravipuram.

== Early life ==
Noushad was born to Muhammed Haneefa and Khadeeja Beevi in 1965. He acquired a Degree from Kerala University in 1983. Noushad resides at Manacaud in Kollam district.

== Political life ==
He started his political career through student movement, in 1985 he was elected as College union general secretary. In 1986 he was elected as Vice chairman of Kerala University union. He became active in DYFI and later won with record margin from Manacaud ward in 1995 and became the vice president of Vadakkevila Panchayat in Kollam. He continued to become councilor in Kollam corporation and served as standing committee chairman. In 2014 he won the Kayalakal ward which was never won by CPM and became the Deputy Mayor of Kollam corporation. In 2016, he contested for assembly from Eravipuram and won the seat with record margin to become the first CPM MLA from Eravipuram.
