= Ryf (surname) =

Ryf is a surname. Notable people with the surname include:

- Claude Ryf (born 1957), Swiss football defender and manager
- Daniela Ryf (born 1987), Swiss triathlete
