= Revolutionary Youth Front =

RYF letter-head

Revolutionary Youth Front is the youth wing of the Revolutionary Socialist Party, a communist party in India.As of 2026, Adv. Vishnu Mohan serves as the Kerala State Secretary of the Revolutionary Youth Front, while Ullas Kovoor serves as its Kerala State President..
