= Revolutionary Socialist Party (India) =

Political party

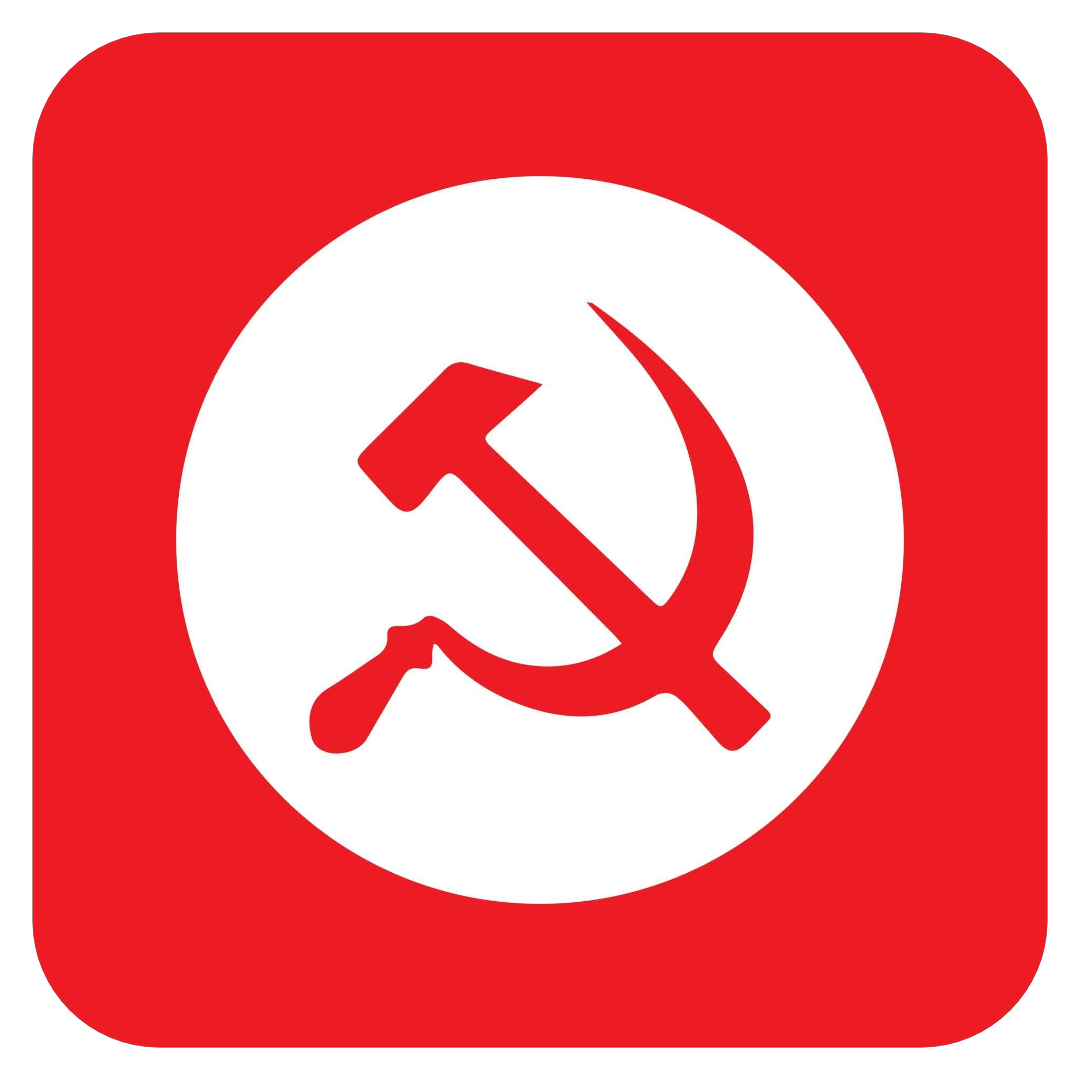
- General Secretary: Manoj Bhattacharya
- Lok Sabha Leader: N. K. Premachandran
- Founder: Tridib Chaudhuri
- Founded: 19 March 1940 (86 years ago)
- Headquarters: 17, Firoz Shah Road, New Delhi – 110001
- Student wing: Progressive Students Union
- Youth wing: Revolutionary Youth Front
- Women's wing: All India United Mahila Sangh
- Labour wing: United Trade Union Congress
- Peasant's wing: Samyukta Kisan Sabha
- Ideology: Communism; Revolutionary socialism Marxism–Leninism
- Political position: Left-wing
- Colours: Red
- ECI status: State Party
- Alliance: INDIA (National level); Left Front (West Bengal); Left Front (Tripura); United Democratic Front (Kerala) (2014–present); Left Democratic Front (Kerala) (1979–2014)
- Seats in Rajya Sabha: 0 / 245
- Seats in Lok Sabha: 1 / 543
- Seats in Kerala Legislative Assembly: 3 / 140
- Number of states and union territories in government: 1 / 31

Election symbol
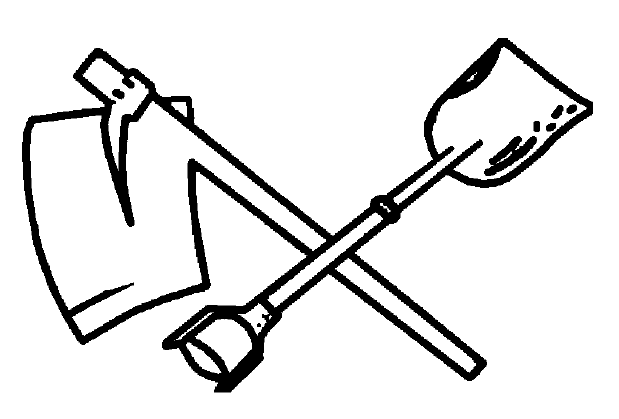

Party flag

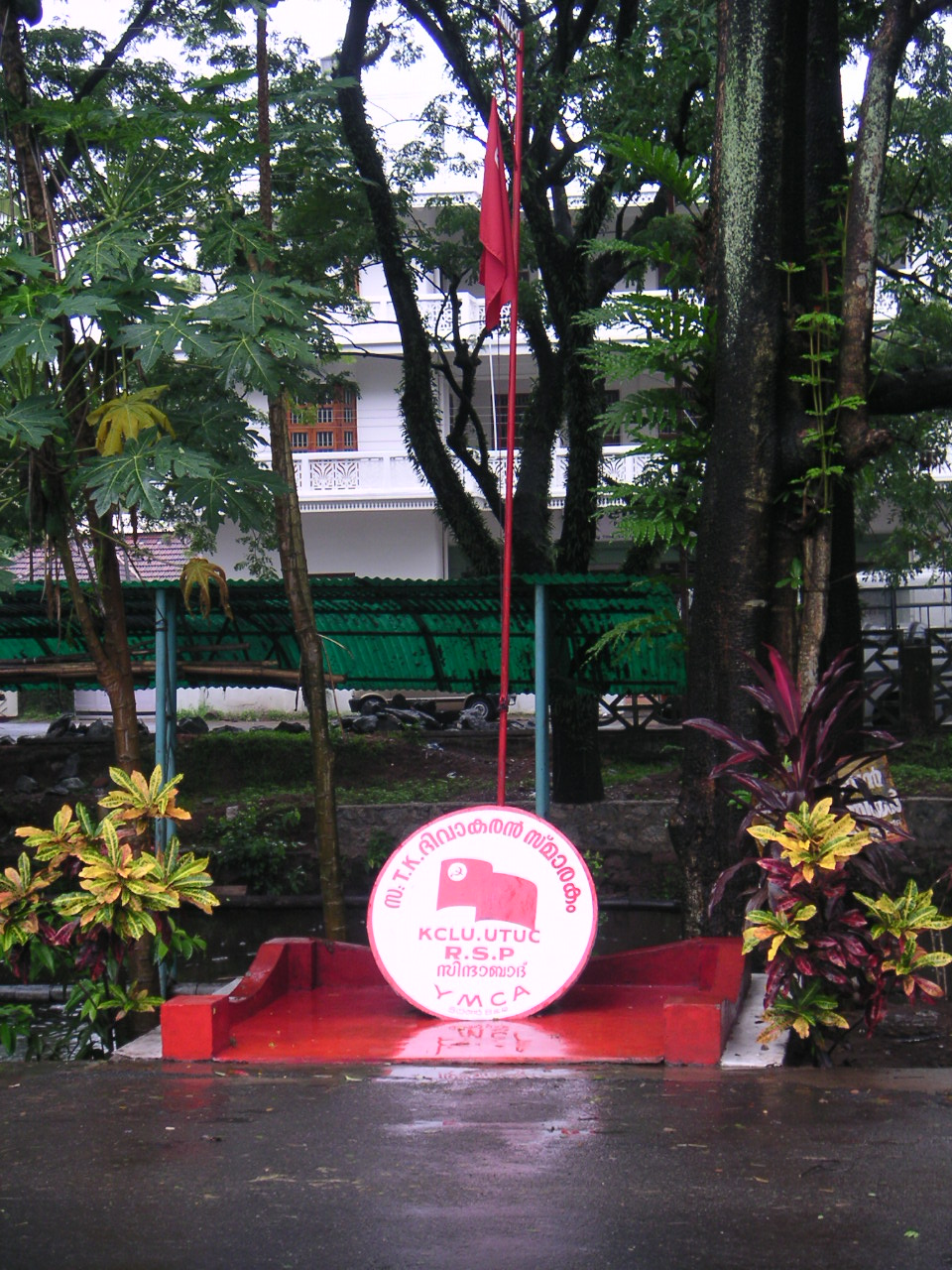
RSP-UTUC flagpole in Alappuzha, Kerala

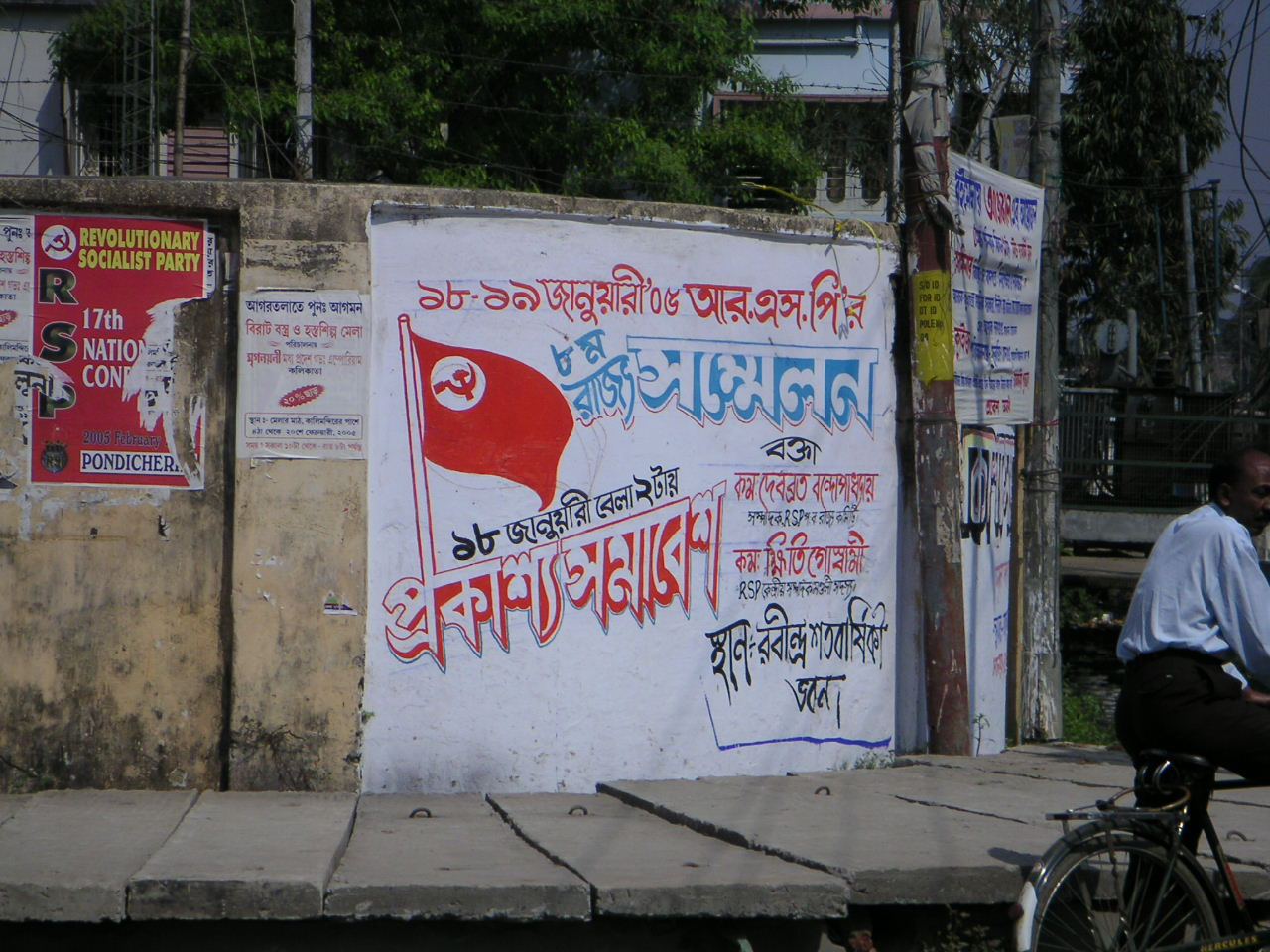
RSP mural in Agartala

The Revolutionary Socialist Party (RSP) is a Marxist-Leninist party in India. The party was founded on 19 March 1940 by Tridib Chaudhuri and has its roots in the Bengali liberation movement Anushilan Samiti and the Hindustan Socialist Republican Army.

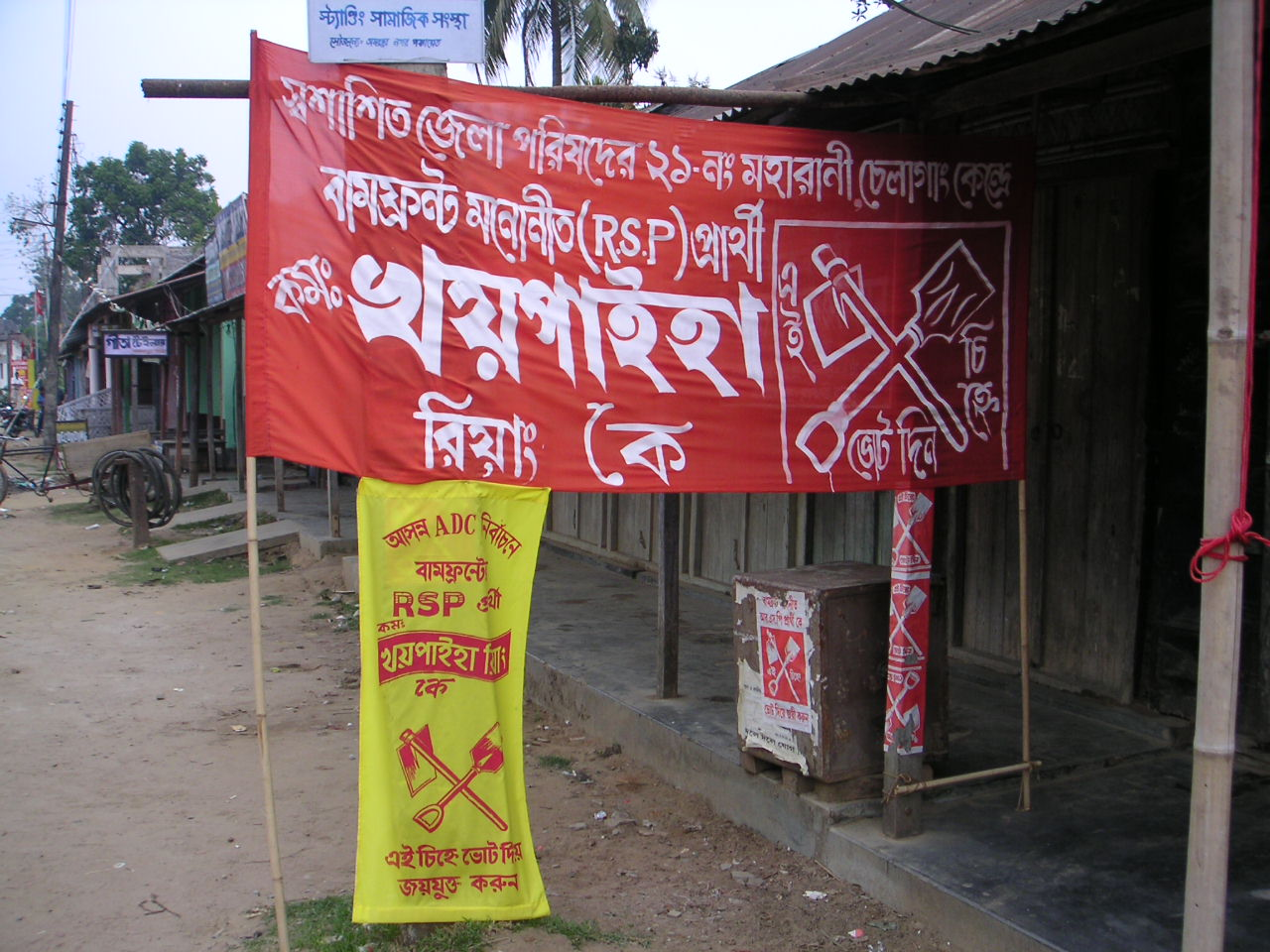
RSP election propaganda in Amarpur, Tripura

The party got around 0.4% of the votes and three seats in the Lok Sabha elections in 1999 and 2004. It is part of the Left Front (West Bengal), Left Front (Tripura) and Congress-led United Democratic Front (Kerala).

RSP poster in Kerala, honouring historical RSP leader T. K. Divakaran

== History ==
=== Development of Anushilan Marxism ===
A major section of the Anushilan movement had been attracted to Marxism during the 1930s, many of them studying Marxist–Leninist literature whilst serving long jail sentences. A minority section broke away from the Anushilan movement and joined the Communist Consolidation, and later the Communist Party of India. The majority of the Anushilan Marxists did however, whilst having adopted Marxist–Leninist thinking, feel hesitant over joining the Communist Party.

The Anushilanites distrusted the political lines formulated by the Communist International. They criticised the line adopted at the 6th Comintern congress of 1928 as 'ultra-left sectarian'. The Colonial theses of the 6th Comintern congress called upon the communists to combat the 'national-reformist leaders' and to 'unmask the national reformism of the Indian National Congress and oppose all phrases of the Swarajists, Gandhists, etc. about passive resistance'. Moreover, when Indian left-wing elements formed the Congress Socialist Party in 1934, the CPI branded it as Social Fascist. When the Comintern policy swung towards Popular Frontism at its 1935 congress, at the time by which the majority of the Anushilan movement were adopting a Marxist–Leninist approach, the Anushilan Marxists questioned this shift as a betrayal of the internationalist character of the Comintern and felt that the International had been reduced to an agency of Soviet foreign policy. Moreover, the Anushilan Marxists opposed the notion of 'Socialism in one country'.

However, although sharing some critiques against the leadership of Joseph Stalin and the Comintern, the Anushilan Marxists did not embrace Trotskyism. Buddhadeva Bhattacharya writes in 'Origins of the RSP' that the "rejection of Stalinism did not automatically mean for them [the Anushlian Samiti] acceptance of Trotskyism. Incidentally, the leninist conception of international socialist revolution is different from Trotsky's theory of Permanent Revolution which deduces the necessity of world revolution primarily from the impossibility of the numerically inferior proletariat in a semi-feudal and semi-capitalist peasant country like Russia holding power for any length of time and successfully undertaking the task of socialist construction in hand without the proletariat of the advanced countries outside the Soviet Union coming to power through an extension of socialist revolution in these countries and coming to the aid of the proletariat of the U.S.S.R."

Anushilan Marxists adhered to the Marxist–Leninist theory of 'Permanent' or 'Continuous' Revolution. '...it is our interest and task to make the revolution permanent' declared Karl Marx as early as 1850 in course of his famous address to the Communist League, 'until all more or less possessing classes have been forced out of their position of dominance, the proletariat has conquered state power, and the association of proletarians, not only in one country but in all dominant countries of the world, has advanced so far that competition among the proletarians of these countries has ceased and that at least the decisive productive forces are concentrated in the hands of the proletarians.'"

By the close of 1936, the Anushilan Marxists at the Deoli Detention Jail in Rajputana drafted a document formulating their political line. This document was then distributed amongst the Anushilan Marxists at other jails throughout the country. When they were collectively released in 1938 the Anushilan Marxists adopted this document, The Thesis and Platform of Action of the Revolutionary Socialist Party of India (Marxist–Leninist): What Revolutionary Socialism Stands for, as their political programme in September that year.

At this point, the Anushilan Marxists, recently released from long jail sentences, stood at a cross-roads. Either they would continue as a separate political entity or they would join an existing political platform. They felt that they lacked the resources to build a separate political party. Joining the CPI was out of the question, due to sharp differences in political analysis. Neither could they reconcile their differences with the Royists. In the end, the Congress Socialist Party, appeared to be the sole platform acceptable for the Anushilan Marxists. The CSP had adopted Marxism in 1936 and their third conference in Faizpur they had formulated a thesis that directed the party to work to transform the Indian National Congress into an anti-imperialist front.

During the summer of 1938, a meeting took place between Jayaprakash Narayan (leader of CSP), Jogesh Chandra Chatterjee, Tridib Chaudhuri and Keshav Prasad Sharma. The Anushilan Marxists then discussed the issue with Narendra Deva. The Anushilan Marxists decided to join CSP, but keeping a separate identity within the party.

=== In the CSP ===
The great majority of the Anushilan Samiti had joined the CSP, not only the Marxist sector. The non-Marxists (who constituted about a half of the membership of the Samiti), although not ideologically attracted to the CSP, felt loyalty towards the Marxist sector. Moreover, around 25% of the HSRA joined the CSP. This group was led by Jogesh Chandra Chatterji.

In the end of 1938 Anushilan Marxists began publishing The Socialist from Calcutta. The editor of the journal was Satish Sarkar. Although the editorial board included several senior CSP leaders like Acharya Narendra Deva, it was essentially an organ of the Anushilan Marxist tendency. Only a handful issues were published.

The Anushilan Marxists were soon to be disappointed by developments inside the CSP. The party, at that the time Anushilan Marxists had joined it, was not a homogenous entity. There was the Marxist trend led by J.P. Narayan and Narendra Deva, the Fabian socialist trend led by Minoo Masani and Asoka Mehta and a Gandhian socialist trend led by Ram Manohar Lohia and Achyut Patwardan. To the Anushilan Marxists differences emerged between the ideological stands of the party and its politics in practice. These differences surfaced at the 1939 annual session of the Indian National Congress at Tripuri. Ahead of the session there were fierce political differences between the leftwing Congress president, Subhas Chandra Bose, and the section led by Gandhi. As the risk of world war loomed, Bose wanted to utilise the weakening of the British empire for the sake of Indian independence. Bose was re-elected as the Congress president, defeating the Gandhian candidate. But at the same session a proposal was brought forward by Govind Ballabh Pant, through which gave Gandhi veto over the formation of the Congress Working Committee. In the Subjects Committee, the CSP opposed the resolution along with other leftwing sectors. But when the resolution was brought ahead of the open session of the Congress, the CSP leaders remained neutral. According to Subhas Chandra Bose himself, the Pant resolution would have been defeated if the CSP had opposed it in the open session. J.P. Narayan stated that although the CSP was essentially supporting Bose's leadership, they were not willing to risk the unity of the Congress. Soon after the Tripuri session the CSP organised a conference in Delhi, in which fierce criticism was directed against their 'betrayal' at Tripuri.

The Anushilan Marxists had clearly supported Bose both in the presidential election as well by opposing the Pant resolution. Jogesh Chandra Chatterji renounced his CSP membership in protest against the action by the party leadership.

Soon after the Tripuri session, Bose resigned as Congress president and formed the Forward Bloc. The Forward Bloc was intended to function as a unifying force for all leftwing elements. The Forward Bloc held its first conference on 22–23 June 1939, and at the same time a Left Consolidation Committee consisting of the Forward Bloc, CPI, CSP, the Kisan Sabha, League of Radical Congressmen, Labour Party and the Anushilan Marxists. Bose wanted the Anushilan Marxists to join his Forward Bloc. But the Anushilan Marxists, although supporting Bose's anti-imperialist militancy, considered that Bose's movement was nationalistic and too eccletic. The Anushilan Marxists shared Bose's view that the relative weakness of the British empire during the war should have been utilised by independence movement. At this moment, in October 1939, J.P. Narayan tried to stretch out an olive branch to the Anushilan Marxists. He proposed the formation of a 'War Council' consisting of himself, Pratul Chandra Ganguli, Jogesh Chandra Chatterjee and Acharya Narendra Deva. But few days later, at a session of the All India Congress Committee, J.P. Narayan and the other CSP leaders pledged not to start any other movements parallel to those initiated by Gandhi.

=== Foundation of RSPI(ML) ===
The Left Consolidation Committee soon fell into pieces, as the CPI, the CSP and the Royists deserted it. Bose assembled the Anti-Compromise Conference in Ramgarh, Bihar, now Jharkhand. The Forward Bloc, the Anushilan Marxists (still members of the CSP at the time), the Labour Party and the Kisan Sabha attended the conference. The conference spelled out that no compromise towards Britain should be made on behalf of the Indian independence movement. At that conference the Anushilan Marxists assembled to launch their own party, the Revolutionary Socialist Party of India (Marxist–Leninist), severing all links to the CSP. The first general secretary of the party was Jogesh Chandra Chatterjee.

The first War Thesis of RSP in 1940 took the call for "turning imperialist war into civil war". But after the attack by Germany on the Soviet Union, the line of the party was clarified. RSP meant that the socialist Soviet Union had to be defended, but that the best way for Indian revolutionaries to do that was to overthrow the colonial rule in their own country. RSP was in sharp opposition to groups like Communist Party of India and the Royist RDP, who meant that antifascists had to support the Allied war effort.

=== After Independence ===
In October 1949, the Kerala Socialist Party passed through a split. A section of its cadres, like N. Sreekandan Nair, Baby John and K. Balakrishnan, joined RSP and built a branch of the party in Kerala.

Ahead of the 1952 general election, negotiations took place between RSP and the United Socialist Organisation of India. USOI, a coalition of socialist groups, wanted RSP to join its ranks. RSP declined, but a partial electoral agreement was made. USOI supported RSP candidates in two Lok Sabha constituencies in West Bengal, but in other constituencies USOI and RSP candidates contested against each other. In the end, three RSP candidates were elected, two from Bengal and one from Kerala.

1952 Lok Sabha election
State	Constituency	Candidate	Votes	%	Elected?
Travancore-Cochin	Quilon-cum-Mavilekara	N. Sreekanthan Nair	220312	21.42%	Yes
Uttar Pradesh	Mainpuri District (E)	Putto Singh	19722	14.15%	No
Uttar Pradesh	Allahabad Dist. (E) cum Jaunpur Dist. (W)	Badri Prasad	18129	3.01%	No
Uttar Pradesh	Gondi Dist. (E) cum Basti Dist. (W)	Harban Singh	4238	3.61%	No
Uttar Pradesh	Ghazipur Dist. (W)	Balrup	22702	13.37%	No
West Bengal	Birbhum	S.K. Ghose	20501	4.07%	No
West Bengal	Berhampore	Tridib Chaudhuri	82579	46.17%	Yes
West Bengal	Calcutta North East	Lahiri Tarapado	5801	4.05%	No
West Bengal	Calcutta North West	Meghnath Saha	74124	53.05%	Yes
Total:		9	468108	0.44%	3

In 1953 Jogesh Chandra Chatterjee left the party and rejoined the Indian National Congress. Tribid Kumar Chaudhuri became the new general secretary of the party.

In 1969 RSP sympathizers in East Pakistan formed the Sramik Krishak Samajbadi Dal. RSP and SKSD maintain a close relations from that moment onwards.

Ahead of the 1977 elections, a section of the party in Kerala broke away and formed the National Revolutionary Socialist Party. The NRSP contested the election in alliance with the Communist Party of India (Marxist).

== Recent history ==
In 2000 a severe split affected the Kerala branch, when the regional party chief Baby John broke away and formed Revolutionary Socialist Party (Bolshevik). The RSP(B) joined the Congress-led United Democratic Front.

In 2002 RSP supported, along with the other Left Front parties, the presidential candidature of Lakshmi Sahgal. Saghal, who challenged the main candidate A. P. J. Abdul Kalam, got around 10% of the votes.

The erstwhile RSP, which was part of the LDF for almost three decades, decided to walk out of the LDF in March 2014, after the CPI(M) arbitrarily announced the candidature of politburo member and sitting legislator M. A. Baby for the Kollam Lok Sabha seat. Later RSP was offered the loksabha seat by the UDF. The RSP candidate N. K. Premachandran defeated LDF candidate M.A. Baby in the election of 2014. Later in June 2014, both the factions of RSP in Kerala- RSP(B) and RSP merged. Later, a faction headed by Kovoor Kunjumon left the party to form a new party named Revolutionary Socialist Party (Leninist). The main faction of the RSP successfully defended its bastion Kollam Loksabha seat in 2019 fielding N. K. Premachandran again despite aggressive campaign by the LDF but suffered huge defeats in the 2016 and 2021 Kerala Legislative Assembly elections, with all its candidates losing. But, Kovoor Kunjumon was elected to the Legislative Assembly from Kunnathur, and his party supports the LDF. In the 2026 election, the RSP re-entered the Assembly after a decade-long absence with 3 seats.

== Current situation ==
In Kerala, RSP is the part of UDF. N K Premachandran is the present MP (Kollam Lok Sabha) in the Lok Sabha. Ullas Kovur, Shibu Baby John and Vishnu Mohan are the present MLAs in Kerala Assembly. RSP is part of the Left Front in West Bengal and Tripura.

== Splits ==
- RSP (Leninist) Led by Kovoor Kunjumon.
- SUCI(C) led by Shibdas Ghosh and Nihar Mukherjee.

== List of General secretaries ==
No.	Name	Tenure
1.	Jogesh Chandra Chatterjee	1940 – 1953
2.	Tridib Kumar Chaudhuri	
3.	Sushil Bhattacharya	
4.	Baby John	
5.	K. Pankajakshan	
6.	T. J. Chandrachoodan	2008 – 2018
7.	Kshiti Goswami	2018 – 2019
8.	Manoj Bhattacharya	2019 – present

== Principal mass organisations ==
- United Trade Union Congress (UTUC)
- Samyukta Kisan Sabha (SKS, Peasants org.)
- Revolutionary Youth Front (RYF)
- Progressive Students Union (PSU)
- All India United Mahila Sangha (AIUMS)
- Nikhil Banga Mahila Sangha (NBMS, women's wing in West Bengal)
- Udbastu Adhikar Raksha Samity

== Publications ==
- The Call (English, publication discontinued)
- Pravaham (Malayalam)
- Ganabarta(Bengali)

== Electoral performance ==
=== West Bengal Legislative Assembly ===
Year	Assembly	Seats contested	Seats won	(+/-) in seats	% of votes	Vote swing	Popular vote	Alliance	Outcome
1952	1st	16	0 / 238	New entry	0.85%	New entry	63,173		Lost
1962	3rd	17	9 / 252	▲9	2.56%	▲1.71	2,45,261		Opposition
1969	5th	17	12 / 280	▲3	2.80%	▲0.24	3,75,983		Opposition
1971	6th	40	3 / 280	▼9	2.05%	▼0.75	2,64,323		Government
1972	7th	17	3 / 280	Steady	2.14%	▲0.09	2,84,643		Government
1977	8th	23	20 / 294	▲17	3.74%	▲1.60	5,36,625	LF	Government
1982	9th	23	19 / 294	▼1	4.01%	▲0.27	9,01,723	LF	Government
1987	10th	23	18 / 294	▼1	3.94%	▼0.07	10,36,138	LF	Government
1991	11th	23	18 / 294	Steady	3.47%	▼0.47	10,73,445	LF	Government
1996	12th	23	18 / 294	Steady	3.72%	▲0.25	13,67,439	LF	Government
2001	13th	23	17 / 294	▼1	3.43%	▼0.29	12,56,951	LF	Government
2006	14th	23	20 / 294	▲3	3.71%	▲0.28	14,63,901	LF	Government
2011	15th	23	7 / 294	▼13	2.96%	▼0.75	14,11,254	LF	Opposition
2016	16th	19	3 / 294	▼4	1.67%	▼1.29	9,11,004	LF+INC	Opposition
2021	17th	11	0 / 294	▼3	0.22%	▼1.45	1,35,188	LF+INC	Lost
2026	18th	18	0 / 294	Steady	0.10%	▼0.12	64,209	LF+	Lost

=== Kerala Legislative Assembly ===
Year	Assembly	Seats contested	Seats won	(+/-) in seats	% of votes	Vote swing	Popular vote
1957	1st	28	2 / 126	New entry	3.23%	New entry	1,88,553
1970	4th	14	6 / 133	▲4	4.40%	▲1.17	3,30,988
1977	5th	11	9 / 140	▲3	4.20%	▼0.20	3,68,642
1980	6th	8	6 / 140	▼3	3.02%	▼1.18	2,88,516
1982	7th	8	4 / 140	▼2	2.76%	▼0.26	2,63,869
1987	8th	6	5 / 140	▲1	2.07%	▼0.69	2,64,401
1991	9th	6	2 / 140	▼3	1.73%	▼0.34	2,45,023
1996	10th	6	5 / 140	▲3	2.07%	▲0.34	2,94,744
2001	11th	6	2 / 140	▼3	1.71%	▼0.36	2,69,690
2006	12th	4	3 / 140	▲1	1.44%	▼0.27	2,24,129
2011	13th	4	2 / 140	▼1	1.31%	▼0.13	2,28,258
2016	14th	5	0 / 140	▼2	1.07%	▼0.24	2,16,071
2021	15th	5	0 / 140	Steady	1.17%	▲0.10	2,44,264
2026	16th	4	3 / 140	▲3	1.22%	▲0.05	2,61,551

=== Tripura Legislative Assembly ===
Year	Assembly	Seats contested	Seats won	(+/-) in seats	% of votes	Vote swing	Popular vote	Outcome
1977	4th	2	2 / 60	New entry	1.66%	New entry	12,446	Government
1983	5th	2	2 / 60	Steady	1.64%	▼0.02	15,218	Government
1988	6th	2	2 / 60	Steady	1.60%	▼0.04	18,182	Opposition
1993	7th	2	2 / 60	Steady	1.58%	▼0.02	21,235	Government
1998	8th	2	2 / 60	Steady	1.65%	▲0.07	22,526	Government
2003	9th	2	2 / 60	Steady	1.89%	▲0.24	28,688	Government
2008	10th	2	2 / 60	Steady	1.69%	▼0.20	31,717	Government
2013	11th	2	0 / 60	▼2	1.95%	▲0.26	42,969	Lost
2018	12th	1	0 / 60	Steady	0.75%	▼1.20	17,568	Lost
2023	13th	1	0 / 60	Steady	0.67%	▼0.08	17,007	Lost

== See also ==
- List of political parties in India
