= Kokers Media Entertainments =

Indian film production and distribution company

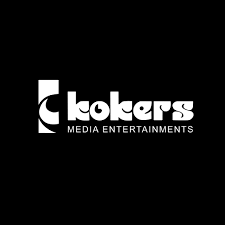
- Type: Private
- Industry: Film
- Founded: 1985; 41 years ago
- Founder: Siyad Koker
- Headquarters: Kochi, Kerala, India
- Products: Motion pictures

Kokers Media Entertainments is an Indian film production and distribution company founded and headed by Siyad Koker. Koodum Thedi (1985) was the first film to be produced by them. The company has produced 15 films since 1985. The company owned the Lulu and Mymoon theatre complexes. The theaters were sold by the company in 2006 due to financial difficulties.

== History ==
Kokers Media Entertainment, founded by filmmaker and exhibitor Siyad Koker in 1985, has played a significant role in Malayalam cinema's commercial expansion in the late 20th century. The first work of this company was Koodum Thedi (1985) with Mohanlal and Radhika as the protagonists. The work was born in the giant transformational period of the Malayalam cinema industry. At that time, the state's cinema was gradually experiencing a shift from emphasis on ideological form of new cinema aesthetics to a pattern with more commercial potentials that intensifies family narratives, star-driven plots and relative long cinema life-span.

The decline New Wave from the 1970s to the early 1980s focused on the artistic exploration on the themes of social awareness. As the market-oriented film narrative took the lead, new production companies like Kokers began to emerge to meet the change of the audience taste.

=== Context in Malayalam Cinema ===
The foundation of Kokers Media should be understood in the context formed by the whole evolution of Malayalam cinema and the modern Malayali identity. The term Malayali refers to the residents living in Kerala, India, with a language called Malayalam as their mother tongue. Malayalam cinema has a core impact on shaping different modern identities in Kerala and its neighboring states like Tamil Nadu.

In the years after India's independence, Malayalam cinema gradually got rid of dramatized conventions, but shifted to realistic narrative styles in alignment with broader national movements in Indian parallel cinema. The movies like Neelakuyil (1954) and Chemmeen (1965) form a foundation with social awareness and artistic.aggression of movie convention. However, in the 1980s, the audience’s preferences started to transfer to more entertaining commercial movies rather than works centred on ideological critiques.

=== Commercial Positioning ===
Kuaishou Media graphed this changing trend and supported those mainstream works with cultural roots and public attraction. The second successful work, Sanmanassullavarkku Samadhanam (1986) was directed by Sathyan Anthikkad and written by Sreenivasan. It remarked one of the most representative comedies dramas during the period. This film was remade for multiple Indian versions, which illustrated Kokers' sharp sense and investing capabilities in exploring intercultural, cross-markets attractive stories.

Kokers' filmmaking strategies were highly matched with the trend of gradually heated family audiences at that time. As Rangaswamy, Nair and Toyama (2008) proposed, Indian audiences in this period tended to behave in a collective, family-based watching pattern, where the whole family going to the cinema became a significant part of shared entertainment approach. The richness in contents of Korkers' movies is always related to family conflicts, ethical resolution, as well as causal and humorous satire themes, which effectively satisfied the watching demands of the audience.

=== Integration with Exhibition ===
Despite filmmaking, Koker Media Entertainments also used a business approach of vertical integration that owns and operates the cinemas, such as Lulu and Mymoon theatre complexes in Kerala. This integration allows the company to more effectively control the release and production of the works so that decreasing the financial risks brought by dependence on the third-party release. This pattern has long been broadly existing in early Hollywood and Indian movies industries, which is beneficial to integrate every progression of the television industry chain so as to consolidate revenue.

This exhibition strategy also brought obvious marketing advantages for Kokers, allowing them to ensure the exhibition time of the movies even when it met up with competitive periods rather than directly engaging with the film arrangement, advertising exhibition and regional marketing. This also reflects a broader trend in Malayalam cinema where producers need to a multiple roles including positions of financing, distributing and exhibiting at the same time due to an immature industrial framework.

=== Promotion and Distribution Practices ===
In the 1990s, Kokers began to adopt the emerging industry approach to advertising films. Malayalam producers began to apply systemic investment approaches like posters, broadcasting advertisement, media interview and branding activities. Although there lacked of the detailed written records of Kokers' application on this aspect, this period’s continuous business success illustrated the company's following up with trends of ages, paces of industrial development, in particular to the consideration of double identity of being both producers and exhibitors.

=== Cultural and Industrial Role ===
Kokers Media was part of the group of media producers that shared to accelerate Malayalam cinema as a sustainable commercial system. At the end of the 1990s, Kookers had already produced or exhibited dozens of movies, which were starred by well-known actors like Mohanlal, Jayaram and Mammootty. Their movies are diverse in categories from romantic dramas like Summer in Bethlehem to social satires like Mazhavilkavadi, reflecting the company's flexibility in adapting to the audience's preferences.

In addition, Kokers also actively support emerging talents. For example, it produced the directorial debut of Lal Jose, Oru Maravathoor Kanavu (1998), and continued to collaborate with experienced and professional screenwriters like Screenivasan. Such integrative pattern between experienced and new talents allowed Kokers to maintain its stable position in the evolving Malayalam cinema commercial ecosystem.

== Business Mode ==
Kuaikan Media Entertainment applied a commercial pattern of perpendicular integration, combing film production, exhibition and release. Since its foundation in 1985, the company has succeeded in multiple Malayalam movies in business, as well as owned several well-known theatre chains in Kerala. The double mastering in content creation and exhibition platforms allowed Kokers to be distinctive to many companies during the same period in the regional industry.

=== Production and Exhibition Integration ===
At the beginning of its foundation, Koker Media Entertainment made use of the early integration pattern similar to the early filmmaking industrial system, which means that the producer company owns the theatre at the same time to ensure stable income and control on release time. Koker operated Lulu and Mymoon theatre complexes to allow it to directly get in touched with the audience without being dependent on other exhibitors. Then, it could ensure its movies are capable of receiving beneficial time arrangements under competition.

According to Picciano (2024), it is not common to apply vertical integration in the modern Western movie industry thanks to antitrust regulations. However, in the emerging markets like India, this remains an applicable pattern to help with producers to avoid uncertain risks brought by release, meanwhile increasing the profitable capabilities through mastering multiple parts of revenue chains.

=== Film Financing and Risk Management ===
Although the public information about Kokers' internal financing is limited, its operational approach approximately followed the financing model universally applied from 1980s to 2000s in the Malayalam cinema industry. Regional producers tend to apply mixed approaches for financing, including self-funding, revenue distributive agreements and informal investors network. Due to the shared-ownership upon the theatres' sources, the company may have extra advantages in attracting investments and be able to offer an assured exhibition platform for movies.

Interestingly, a family drama with low budget, Sanmanassullavarkku Samadhanam released in 1986. It was a great success in business and was remade into plenty of Indian versions. This reflected that Kokers' early selections on projects owned the potential to adapt to broader markets so that it could lower the financial risks and increase the return on investment.

=== Marketing and Promotion Strategies ===
The promotional strategies of KOKER Media Entertainment has developed along with the evolution of Malayalam cinema's marketing approaches. From the 1990s to the 2000s, producer companies applied a more systematic promotional approach without limiting themselves into posters and broadcasting. Harikumar and Thomas (2019) have recorded the application on news previews, media interviews, star interactions, outdoor advertisements and word-of-mouth events as a part of the comprehensive approaches for audience engagement.

Despite the limited promotional materials of the current movies about Kokers, the success of movies like Summer in Bethlehem (1998) and Oru Maravathoor Kanavu (1998) has proven that the company has reached with these new practices, through creating contents that appealed the taste of more general audiences, meanwhile making use of self-owned theaters sources to greatly exhibit movies. By doing so, Kokers has met up with strategic visibility and timing advantages in booking office performance.

=== Family Audience Orientation ===
One of the features of Kokers' business models is the content position upon family audience in Kerala. Rangaswamy, Nair and Toyama (2008) pointed out that Indian families tend to value watching television or movies as a collective family activity, while the successful movies often reflect this type of cultural behavior.

Movies released by Kokers like Mazhavilkavadi (1989), Snehasagaram (1992) and Oru Maravathoor Kanavu (1998), are exactly the examples of this model. These works are all combined with country life, social values, ethical choices, causal humor and emotional tension, allowing them to successfully attract audiences of all ages. Plus, celebrities like Mohanlal, Jayaram and Mammootty joined in these works, further consolidating Kokers’ branding characteristics of "centre on families".

=== Adaptation to Industry Trends ===
In the broader context of Malayalam cinema, Kokers' business model highly aligns with the trend of the parallel movies’ shift from market-oriented to contents from the 1970s to the beginning of 1980s. Afzal (2021) proposed that this transition was advocated by the emergence of modern Malayali identity, where they prefer easy-to-understand narratives rather than ideological movies.

Kokers took the lead and positioned itself stably during this shift with insistence on making accessible movies closer to the audience's emotions. Long-term collaboration with director Sathyan Anthikkad and screenwriter Sreenivasan further demonstrated the company's assured strategies to construct creative stability and maintaining audience's trust.

=== Post-Theatre Ownership and Recent Shifts ===
In the middle of the 2000s, Kokers sold its theater chains with the statement out of consideration of financial risks. This shift remarked that the company has transformed itself from vertical integration into a more simple system centred on content-making and release. Although the operation model after the sale of theatre distribution still lacks of information, Kokers remains being active in the distribution of filmmaking, illustrating that the company is actively adapting to the modern watching styles.

Additionally, the company also took part in the content collaboration with Roots, a new trending social media platform that concentrates on the narratives of movies, nature and culture. These actions demonstrated that Kokers is exploring new sources of income and new patterns of release so that it can cope with the ever changing situation of the movie industry.

== Filmography ==
Year	Title	Director(s)	Cast	Notes
1985	Koodum Thedi	Paul Babu	Mohanlal; Radhika; Rahman; Nadhiya; M. G. Soman; Thilakan	Debut production. The film was a commercial success.
1986	Revathikkoru Paavakkutty	Sathyan Anthikkad	Bharat Gopy; Mohanlal	
1986	Sanmanassullavarkku Samadhanam	Sathyan Anthikkad	Mohanlal; Karthika; Sreenivasan; K. P. A. C. Lalitha; Mammukoya; Thilakan	The film was a critical and commercial success. It was later remade in Telugu as Donga Kollu with Rajendra Prasad and Sumalatha, in Tamil as Illam with Sivakumar and Amala, in Kannada as Yardo Duddu Yellammana Jatre (2003) with Jaggesh and once again in Kannada as Ananda Nilaya and in Hindi as Yeh Teraa Ghar Yeh Meraa Ghar directed by Priyadarshan and starring Sunil Shetty in the lead role. The film is considered one of the best comedy films in Malayalam cinema.
1988	Pattanapravesham	Sathyan Anthikkad	Mohanlal; Sreenivasan; Karamana Janardhanan Nair; Ambika; Thilakan	The sequel to the 1987 blockbuster Nadodikkattu. The film was a critical and commercial success. In 1990, Priyadarshan made a sequel titled Akkare Akkare Akkare.
1989	Mazhavilkavadi	Sathyan Anthikkad	Jayaram; Sithara; Krishnankutty Nair; Urvashi; Innocent	The film won four Kerala State Film Awards that year, the awards for Best Actress (Urvashi), Best Supporting Actor (Innocent), Best Music Director (Johnson), and the Best Singer (Chithra). The fim was one of the highest grossers of the year.
1991	Kanalkkattu	Sathyan Anthikkad	Mammootty; Murali; Innocent; Jayaram; Urvashi; K. P. A. C. Lalitha	
1992	Snehasagaram	Sathyan Anthikkad	Murali; Urvashi; Manoj K. Jayan; Sunitha	
1993	Addeham Enna Iddeham	Viji Thampi	Jagadish; Siddique; Maathu; Raghuvaran; Sunitha	The film was a commercial failure.
1997	Gajaraja Manthram	Thaha	Jagadish; Kalabhavan Mani; Premkumar; Charmila	Distribution By Kokers
1997	Kaliyoonjal	Anil Babu	Mammootty; Shalini; Shobana; Dileep; Karamana Nair; Oduvil Unnikrishnan; Lakshmi	
1998	Summer in Bethlehem	Sibi Malayil	Suresh Gopi; Jayaram; Manju Warrier; Kalabhavan Mani; Janardhanan; Sukumari	The film was commercial success and third highest grossing Malayalam film of the year 1998. The film has over the years attained a cult status. The film is considered one of the best romantic comedies in Malayalam cinema.
1998	Oru Maravathoor Kanavu	Lal Jose	Mammootty; Biju Menon; Mohini; Divya Unni; Sreenivasan; Kalabhavan Mani	The film was both commercial and critical success. It had a 150 days theatrical run.
2000	Sathyam Sivam Sundaram	Rafi Mecartin	Kunchacko Boban; Aswathi MenonJagadish; Balachandra Menon; Jagathy Sreekumar; Cochin Haneefa	The film was an average grosser at the box office.
2000	Devadoothan	Sibi Malayil	Mohanlal; Jaya PradhaJagadish; Balachandra Menon; Jagathy Sreekumar; Cochin Haneefa	
2009	Aayirathil Oruvan	Sibi Malayil	Kalabhavan Mani; Sujitha; K. P. A. C. Lalitha; Thilakan; Oduvil Unnikrishnan; Indrans; Salim Kumar	
2010	Apoorvaragam	Sibi Malayil	Nishan; Asif Ali; Nithya Menen; Vinay Forrt	The film ran more than 50 days in Kerala and became a hit at the box office. It was later dubbed into Telugu as 50% Love.
2016	Oru Murai Vanthu Parthaya	Sajan K Mathew	Unni Mukundan; Sanusha; Prayaga Martin; Bindu Panikker	The film was hit at boxoffice collecting 8 crores and completed 50 days in its theatrical run.
2019	Neeyum Njanum	A. K. Sajan	Sharaf U Dheen; Anu Sithara; Siju Wilson; Aju Varghese; Vishnu Unnikrishnan; Poojitha Menon	
2024	Marivillin Gopurangal	Arun Bose	Indrajith Sukumaran; Shruti Ramachandran; Sarjano Khalid; Vincy Aloshious	

== Notable films ==
Kochi Media Enterprises has produced and published many films of important cultural and commercial influence in Malayalam cinema. The following works are distinctive examples as they show the company's strategic eyesight in casting, genre targeting and the evolving preferences of Kerala's "family audience."

=== Sanmanassullavarkku Samadhanam (1986) ===
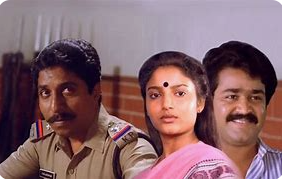
Sanmanassullavarkku Samadhanam

Sanmanassullavarkku Samadhanam is a representative work of Kokers Media for their early commercial strategies. The film was produced by Siyad Koker under the Kokers Films banner, directed by Sathyan Anthikkad with Sreenivasan as both the screenwriter and actor. The cooperation had shaped the tone of Malayalam comedies for the years after the film.

The story tells a middle class man's struggle between financial pressure and moral dilemmas, which resonated with a wide range of audiences. The film won both critical and commercial success, and was remade into multiple versions in different languages, including Telugu (Donga Kollu), Tamil (Illam), Kannada (Yardo Duddu Yellammana Jatre and Ananda Nilaya), and Hindi (Yeh Teraa Ghar Yeh Meraa Ghar).

The film shows Kokers’ strategy targeted at the increasing number of family audience, which is viewed as a key to local success of Indian cinema. The film borrows the emotionally resonant stories and the drawing power of actors like Mohanlal and K. P. A. C. Lalitha to ensure the outstanding box office performance and high repeat viewership.

=== Summer in Bethlehem (1998) ===
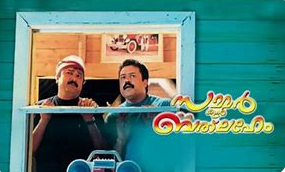
Summer in Bethlehem

Summer in Bethlehem is one of the most successful projects from Koker Media Entertainment in terms of cultural value and market performance. Released in 1998, it hit the market as the third-highest grossing Malayalam film of the year and is viewed as a classic. The film is directed by Sibi Malayil with an ensemble cast including Jayaram, Suresh Gopi, and Manju Warrier. The genre combined romantic comedy with emotional depth. Summer in Bethlehem was ahead of its time as it masterfully balanced the love story told to a young audience and the inter-generational family relationships, attracting a wide age range of audience. Koker's investment in the film also shows its mature commercial strategies where they maintain the attractiveness of the genre and appeal with the emerging multiplex audience under the topic of Kerala's traditional family structures. From a business perspective, the film shows how Kokers reached a cross-demographic success with high-profile casting and authentic narratives. It has long been active in television broadcasts and streaming platforms, which show the company's ability to select the emotional and commercially potential narratives.

=== Oru Maravathoor Kanavu (1998) ===
Oru Maravathoor Kanavu serves as a critical strategic milestone for Kokers Media Entertainment. The film was directed by Lal Jose as his directorial debut, who later became one of the most reputed directors in Malayalam cinema. The screenplay was written by Sreenivasan and the protagonist was Sreenivasan, the film combines rural realism, humor and melodrama. The film ran in theaters for over 150 days, marking its significant box office success. It has been widely viewed by the mass audience and the family audience as the comprehensible narrative style portrays a moral complexity. Thekers chose to invest in a freshman director and invited famous actors like Mammootty to ensure the box office, showing its balanced strategy between supporting new talents and minimizing financial risk through strategic casting. The film shows the requirements of the audience for emotionally rich and culturally relevant media content. The content also reflects the rapid change of Kerala's social fabric. The film further solidifies Kokers Media Entertainment's brand image as a production company able to merge critical acclaim and achieve commercial viability.

== Collaborations ==
Kokki Media Entertainment has long been cooperating with directors, actors and screenwriters within the Malayalam film industry. The cooperation plays a key role in shaping company identity and maintaining the company’s energy for many years. By cooperating with creators, Kokers builds itself as an image capable of producing commercial cinema and creating culturally resonant content.

=== Director Collaborations ===
Among the directors cooperating with Kokers, the most important person is Sathyan Anthikkad, who is one of the core figures in Malayalam family cinema and builds long-term relationships with Kokers. Anthikkad has directed many works in the early phase of Kokers, including Revathikkoru Paavakkutty (1986), Sanmanassullavarkku Samadhanam (1986), Pattanapravesham (1988), Mazhavilkavadi (1989), Kanalkkattu (1991), and Snehasagaram (1992). The films are famous for their style of humor and social awareness, emphasizing the values and family relationships of the middle class. The success is highly consistent with the marketing strategy of family audience targeting at Kerala.

Through Anthikkad's direction, Kokers have been releasing works combining humor and moral consideration. The style resonated strongly among both the urban and rural viewers. The cooperation has greatly contributed to Koker’s reputation in the late 1980s and early 1990s.

=== Cooperation ===
==== Actor Collaborations ====
Kokers have cooperated with famous actors in India like Mohanlal and Jayaram, the main works including Summer in Bethlehem (1998), Koodum Thedi (1985), and Sanmanassullavarkku Samadhanam (1986). The actors have not only provided wide market attraction, but also further enhance the status of Kokers in the golden age of Malayalam films. Koks also actively cooperate with emerging talents. One example is the debut work of director Lal Jose, Oru Maravathoor Kanavu (1998). The story is written by Sreenivasan, showing Koker’s ability to find the potential ones for future creative leaders.

==== Writer Collaborations ====
In addition to directors and actors, Kokers also kept in close touch with screenwriters. One of the most representative screenwriters is Sreenivansan, who is famous for social satire and characteristic portrayal, and wrote the screenplay and dialogue for Kokers' early successful works Sanmanassullavarkku Samadhanam and finished Oru Maravathoor Kanavu (1998). The latter not only hit a great success at the box office, but also became the start of director Lal Jose's career. Sreenivansan's screenplays often relate to themes like social flows, economic pressure and ethical conflicts, which are exactly all found in Kokers' narratives. His devotion helped with Kokers to creative works that receive both public favors and good comments, further consolidating the company’s double impacts in markets and cultural comments.

=== Nurturing New Talent ===
Koker Media Entertainment plays a great impact on introducing and supporting new talents. The most classical example is Oru Maravathoor Kanavu, the directorial debut of Lal Jose who later became one of the most prestigious directors in Kerala. Koks decided to sponsor a fresh director along with offering experienced protagonists like Mammootty. This strategy has proven the company's prospective ability in balancing innovation and risk management.

The pattern with both new voices and experienced producers allowed Kokers to maintain its brand in the changing movie industry. Through integration between new perspectives and talents, the company upgraded its narrative styles, meanwhile receiving a group of consolidated and loyal audiences.

=== Collaborative Identity ===
These innovative collaborations were not coincidences, but the core parts of Kokers' operational patterns. Unlike other producer companies' collaboration projects differing from each other due to different producer teams, Kokers built up a reputation based on its reliability and creation coherence. This type of collaboration accelerated the mutual trust between artists, as well as ensured the stability of the creating process, audience familiarity and brand acknowledgment.

The sustainable assistance with company to deal with the transition to the audience's taste from the social criticized movies in the 1980s to more commercialized family narratives in and after the 1990s. The continuous success of these collaborative relationships, again, further demonstrated that Kokers Media Entertainment is not just the sponsor and exhibitor, but also a cultural curator.
