= Oru Murai Vanthu Parthaya =

Oru Murai Vanthu Parthaya (transl. Have You Ever Met Me) may refer to:

- "Oru Murai Vanthu Parthaya", a song from the 1993 Indian Malayalam-language film Manichithrathazhu
- Oru Murai Vanthu Parthaya (film), a 2016 Indian Malayalam-language film starring Unni Mukundan
