= Devadoothan =

2000 Indian film

- Theatrical Release poster
- Directed by: Sibi Malayil
- Written by: Raghunath Paleri
- Produced by: Siyad Koker
- Starring: Mohanlal; Jaya Prada
- Cinematography: Santosh Thundiyil
- Edited by: L. Bhoominathan
- Music by: Vidyasagar
- Production company: Kokers Films
- Distributed by: Kokers and Anupama Release
- Release date: 27 December 2000
- Running time: 167 minutes
- Country: India
- Language: Malayalam
- Box office: ₹5.40 crores (re-release)

Devadoothan (transl. Heavenly Messenger) is a 2000 Indian Malayalam-language mystery horror film directed by Sibi Malayil, written by Raghunath Paleri, and produced by Siyad Koker through Kokers Films. It stars Mohanlal in the title role with Jaya Prada, Vineeth Kumar, Janardhanan, Jagathy Sreekumar, Murali, Jagadish, Sarath Das and Vijayalakshmi in supporting roles. The film features original songs and score composed by Vidyasagar. The cinematography was done by Santosh Thundiyil.

The plot follows a struggling musician Vishal Krishnamoorthy who returns to his alma mater to direct a musical. Years ago, he was expelled from the college by Madam Angelina Ignatius for allegedly playing a protected musical instrument, Seven Bells, which he claimed played by itself. Vishal encounters the same haunting melody and embarks on a quest to solve the mystery of the Seven Bells.

Devadoothan was released on 22 December 2000, during the Christmas season. Though the songs and performances were applauded, the film didn't resonate much with the audience, citing it "The film was ahead of its times". Despite underperforming at the box office, the film received critical acclaim. Over the years, it has achieved a cult following. It won three Kerala State Film Awards, including Best Film with Popular Appeal and Aesthetic Value, Best Music Director, and Best Costume Designer. A digitally remastered 4K Dolby Atmos Director's Cut was released on 26 July 2024. The film became a commercial success after the re-release and emerged as one of the highest-grossing re-released Indian film.

== Plot ==
Vishal Krishnamoorthy, a world famous musician is about to receive a prestigious musical award for his symphony Rhythm of Love. The story now cuts back to his past where Vishal is struggling to pay his debts and to build a career of his own. Despite having a deep knowledge in music, he experiments with other businesses which all ended in failure. One day, Vishal gets a letter from the principal-cum-priest of his old college from which he was expelled. It was an invitation to work as the director for a musical play with the present students of the college. At first, Vishal refuses to go because of his hatred towards the college, but he later changes his mind.

Years ago, Vishal was expelled from the college by Madam Angelina Ignatius who runs the institution in the memory of her late father, William Ignatius. There was a special musical instrument called the "Seven Bells" kept by Angelina, locked inside a chapel within the college where no one was allowed to enter. Vishal was accused by Angelina for playing the Seven Bells, but his refutation was the instrument was playing by itself. But Angelina had him expelled from the college.

Vishal arrives at the college. The play is about the romance of Mary and Nikhil Maheshwar. Mary is the only daughter of a rich man who falls in love with a young musician, Nikhil Maheshwar. Despite her father's dislike, she falls for Nikhil. Later, Nikhil goes to get the consent of his parents for their marriage, but never to return. Mary keeps waiting for him. While rehearsing the play, Vishal interferes at certain occasions and changes parts of the story.

On the night of his arrival, while composing a song for the play, Vishal hears a beautiful melodic composition from the tape record near him. He turns it off, but the music continues playing automatically. He realizes that it is the same melody that was heard from the Seven Bells instrument for which he was expelled. The next day, as the rehearsal progresses, in a scene where Mary expresses her love to Nikhil, Vishal suggests that they replace the name Mary with Alina which he intuitively deduces from the music he heard last night.

At that night too, Vishal is woken by the same music. He follows it and finds that it is coming from the chapel of the Seven Bells. He rushes there to see who is playing it, but sees nobody but the instrument playing by itself. Hearing the music, Angelina also gets there and sees Vishal sitting in front of the Bells. She accuses him again for playing it and tries to get him out of the college, but Vishal decides to stay and to find out the truth.

Vishal asks the principal about the name Nikhil Maheshwar. He says that it was from an old romantic poem written by Angelina. Looking for answers, he visits an old priest who was the former principal of the college and who knew Angelina from a young age. He tells Vishal that her actual name is Alina. She got the Seven Bells instrument from her father William Ignatius as a gift. William also brought someone from Agra to play the instrument. His name was Maheshwar. Alina's admiration of Maheshwar's music turned to love, enraging her father. Then after six years, Maheshwar left the place promising that he would return, but he never came back and Alina is still waiting for him.

Vishal searches for books about the Seven Bells in the college library. He finds a piece of paper with some musical notations from an old book. He feels that it was written by Maheshwar. Trying to play it on the instrument, he recognizes it as the same music he hears at night, but he feels like he is losing his vision. By intuition, he concludes that Maheswar was blind. He goes to Angelina and shows the music to her. She admits that it was created by Maheshwar and she wrote it down. She now realizes that Vishal was innocent of the accusation for which he was expelled from college.

At night, when Vishal is sitting in front of the Seven Bells, Sneha, the student who plays the role of Alina in the play and who is a fan of Vishal's music comes to the chapel and requests him to play the bells. Vishal reveals the truth that it is not he who plays the instrument but some invisible person.

Vishal dreams about a horse carriage and when he tells it to Angelina, she brings Vishal to see the old carriage in which she used to take Maheshwar out. There he meets Alberto, William's old stableman. Vishal feels something mysterious about Alberto. Vishal goes to the library again to find records about Angelina and Williams, but he finds a human skeleton in a glass case. He is told by the principal that it was the workers who got it when they dug the soil for laying the foundation for a new hostel block. He finally concludes that the Seven Bells was played by Maheshwar's soul.

The search for whereabouts on Maheshwar leads Vishal to Alberto who reveals to him that Maheswar was buried alive by him under the orders of William, Alina's father, who himself died soon after the burial in an accident caused by the horses of the horse carriage. The skeleton in the library is revealed to be Maheshwar's. When Vishal tells Sneha that he cannot let Alina know about the truth, the Seven Bells starts playing violently. Seeing this, Alina now understands the truth and she goes to the library hall where the skeleton is kept. Vishal tries to stop her but he is unable to do so. After a mysterious light comes out from the library, Vishal and Sneha enter the library and they find Alina dead and two doves are seen outside, flying away meaning that Alina is finally with Maheswar. The film ends by showing Vishal dedicating his award to Maheswar and Alina by placing it above The Seven Bells in the present.

== Cast ==
- Mohanlal as Vishal Krishnamoorthy
- Jaya Prada as Angelina Ignatius / Aleena (Voice Dubbed by Bhagyalakshmi)
  - Nirmala Shyam as Young Aleena
- Vineeth Kumar as Nikhil Maheshwar, Aleena's Lover
- Janardhanan as College Principal Edward / Principal Achan
- Jagathy Sreekumar as Fr. Sthevachan
- Murali as Alberto
- Jagadish as Ithakk, Vishal's Friend
- Sarath Das as Manoj, Sneha's boyfriend
- Vijayalakshmi as Sneha (Voice Dubbed by Sreeja Ravi)
- Lena as Annie Kurian, Sneha's Friend
- Radhika as College Student, Sneha's Friend
- Sandra Amy as College Student, Sneha's Friend
- Jijoy Rajagopal as Varghese Kuruvila, Manoj's Friend
- Raja Krishnamoorthy as William Ignatius, Aleena's Father
- Joice Nadakapadom as Joy
- Dhanya Menon as Azhagi
- Vishnu Bhuvanendran as Violinist
- Ramankutty Varrier as Father Stheva

== Production ==
In 1983, Sibi Malayil conceived Devadoothan as his debut feature film while working as an assistant director at Navodaya Studio. Director Jijo Punnoose suggested Raghunath Paleri develop the story into a screenplay to be produced under the Navodaya company. Sibi and Paleri spent a year perfecting the screenplay which Jojo Paulose supported, which originally featured a seven-year-old boy in a boarding school as the protagonist. In this version, the boy mediates between a deceased blind musician and his lover, who remains unaware of the musician's death. Sibi considered Naseeruddin Shah and Madhavi in the roles of the musician Maheshwar and his lover Alina, but the project stalled for unknown reasons. The film was originally titled as Seven Bells. It was revealed by Sibi during an interview in 2024, Navodaya rejected script citing it wouldn't work .

In 2000, Sibi discussed collaborating on a film with producer Siyad Kokker and revisited the Devadoothan story. The screenplay was reworked, shifting the setting from a boarding school to a college and adding a parallel love story between two college students through whom the spirit communicates. Initially, the makers intended to cast newcomers, and R. Madhavan, then a television actor, was approached for the role of the young lover. However, Madhavan was already committed to Mani Ratnam's Alai Payuthey (2000). While searching for other actors, Mohanlal heard the story from Kokker and expressed interest in playing the lead. This led Sibi and Paleri to rewrite the screenplay to accommodate Mohanlal, resulting in the final version of Devadoothan.

Vineeth Kumar experienced fear of dogs on set during the filming of the death scene of Maheshwar where he got bitten during the second take as his co-star Murali was angry about the stunt.

The film was set against the backdrop of Ooty.

== Soundtrack ==
Devadoothan

Soundtrack album by Vidyasagar
- Released: 2000
- Recorded: 2000
- Genre: Popular music
- Length: 30:05
- Language: Malayalam
- Label: Satyam Audios
- Producer: Vidyasagar

Vidyasagar chronology
Madhuranombarakattu (2000)	Devadoothan (2000)	Mister Butler (2000)

The music for the film was composed by Vidyasagar, with lyrics by Kaithapram Damodaran Namboothiri, except for the Tyagaraja composition "Entharo Mahanubhavulu". The traditional Pancharatna Kriti, composed in the Shree raga, was remixed with a Western classical piece for the film. Vidyasagar won the Kerala State Film Award for Best Music Director for his work. The soundtrack was released by Satyam Audios.

All music is composed by Vidyasagar.

No.	Title	Artist(s)	Length
1.	"Karale Nin"	K. J. Yesudas, Preetha Kannan	06.04
2.	"En Jeevane"	S. Janaki; Backing Vocals by P. Jayachandran	05.02
3.	"Entharo Mahanubhavulu"	Symphony, Palghat Ram Prasad	05.02
4.	"En Jeevane"	K. J. Yesudas; Backing Vocals by P. Jayachandran	05.02
5.	"Poove Poove"	P. Jayachandran, K. S. Chithra	05.24
6.	"Mathapoothiri"	M. G. Sreekumar, Sujatha Mohan	04.38
Total length:			30:05

=== Reception ===
The soundtrack was critically acclaimed.

== Release ==
Devadoothan was a Christmas release on 22 December 2000. The film initially failed at the box office, leading to despair for the producer and director. However, later it received critical acclaim for its theme, music, cast performance, direction and a unique and fresh storyline. The film was re-released on 26 July 2024 in theatres. The re-released version was a 4K Remastered Director's Cut. According to the director, the Director's Cut version was a trimmed version, as 30 minutes of scenes of Jagathy Sreekumar were cut from the original theatrical version based on the audience's response. It was successful after its re release.

== Accolades ==
Award	Category	Nominee(s)	Result	Ref.
Kerala State Film Award	Best Film with Popular Appeal and Aesthetic Value	Siyad Koker, Sibi Malayil	Won	
Kerala State Film Award	Best Music Director	Vidyasagar	Won	
Kerala State Film Award	Best Costume Designer	A. Satheesan	Won	

== Legacy ==
Upon release, the film underperformed at the box office. Despite this, over the years, the film achieved cult following, with critics stating that the film was ahead of its time. The film when it began telecasting on television, eventually developed a massive cult following, and is regarded as one of the best films ever made in Malayalam cinema. One of the reason for its failure at the box office was the style of the film which was unlike anything the Malayali audience had seen before.

The film was re released after 24 years of its initial release. The new version was remastered in 4k and the soundtrack was mixed in Dolby Atmos. The release gained huge appreciation with almost all shows running successfully in theaters with houseful shows. Siyad Kokker said they intend to submit the film for the National Film Awards.
