= Dasan and Vijayan =

Fictional duo

- Mohanlal and Sreenivasan as Dasan and Vijayan from Nadodikkattu
- First appearance: Nadodikkattu (1987)
- Last appearance: Akkare Akkare Akkare (1990)
- Created by: Siddique–Lal
- Portrayed by: Mohanlal (Dasan); Sreenivasan (Vijayan)

In-universe information
- Full name: Ramadas (Dasan) & Vijayan
- Gender: Male
- Occupation: Detective
- Nationality: Indian

Dasan and Vijayan (or Ramadas and Vijayan) are the protagonists of the Nadodikkattu trilogy. The comical characters were created by directors Sreenivasan, a vague pilot theme from Siddique–Lal, and are portrayed by Mohanlal (Dasan) and Sreenivasan (Vijayan). They first appeared as unemployed workers, later becoming police officers by profession working in the Crime Investigation Department (CID) in Tamil Nadu Police, India. The characters first appeared in the 1987 black comedy film Nadodikkattu and later in its sequels Pattanapravesham (1988), and Akkare Akkare Akkare (1990).

The first two films in the series was directed by Sathyan Anthikad and the later by Priyadarshan, the trilogy was scripted by Sreenivasan. Since the release of Nadodikkattu, the characters have achieved a cult status in the popular culture of Kerala, along with some other characters in the film, such as Anandan Nambiar (Thilakan), Gafoorka (Mamukkoya), Pavanai (Captain Raju), Prabhakaran (Karamana Janardanan Nair) and several dialogues in the film has become catchphrases. The characters were first introduced as unemployed youth.

== Overview ==
The characters were created by Siddique–Lal in a story they wrote. Dasan is shown as more educated than Vijayan, and enjoys teasing Vijayan about the same. The chemistry of Mohanlal-Sreenivasan combo in the film was widely acclaimed, since then they have united for such roles in many films that followed. The series began with Nadodikkattu in 1987, directed by Sathyan Anthikad, he directed its sequel Pattanapravesham in the following year, in 1990, Priyadarshan continued the series with his directorial Akkare Akkare Akkare. Nadodikkattu was significant in increasing the demand for comedy films in Malayalam. About its cult following, Anthikad says "the secret of the duo still being alive in the Malayali's consciousness may be because it's a story of two unemployed youngsters told using a humorous narrative. Unemployment was one of the biggest issues and migration to greener pastures was typical of Malayali experience. This has continued to the current decade. So, the audience has no problem relating to Dasan and Vijayan,".

== Film appearances ==
=== Nadodikkattu ===
In the film directed by Sathyan Anthikad, Dasan and Vijayan are two unemployed youth struggling to make two ends meet. Upon release, the film was widely acclaimed and was a commercial success. M. G. Soman appears as himself, although he appears in a character role as the Police Commissioner in Akkare Akkare Akkare.

=== Pattanapravesham ===
After the events of Nadodikkattu, Dasan and Vijayan, who are now police officers, are enlisted to investigate a homicide in Kerala. Being clueless in this new profession, they become involved with a gang of drug traffickers. A new threat follows them when Anandan Nambiar escapes from jail. Pattanapravesham, also directed by Anthikad, was a critical and commercial success.

=== Akkare Akkare Akkare ===
The film sees Dasan and Vijayan investigating the theft and subsequent smuggling of a gold crown. This film was directed by Priyadarshan and is set almost entirely in the United States. Principal photography took place around Houston and Los Angeles. M. G. Soman, Mukesh, Maniyanpilla Raju, Parvathy, Nedumudi Venu, Sukumari, Jagadish, and K. P. A. C. Lalitha appeared as accompanying characters. Earning praise for its use of slapstick humour and dialogue, this film performed well at the box office too.
