= Kanalkkattu =

- Poster designed by Gayathri Ashokan
- Directed by: Sathyan Anthikad
- Written by: Lohithadas
- Produced by: Siyad Koker
- Starring: Mammootty; K. P. A. C. Lalitha
- Cinematography: Vipin Mohan
- Edited by: K. Rajagopal
- Music by: Johnson
- Production company: Kokers Films
- Release date: 4 July 1991
- Running time: 153 Minutes
- Country: India
- Language: Malayalam

Kanalkkattu is a 1991 Indian Malayalam-language film directed by Sathyan Anthikad and written by Lohithadas. It stars Mammootty, and K. P. A. C. Lalitha, in lead roles with Murali, Mamukkoya, Jayaram, Urvashi, Shari, Oduvil Unnikrishnan, Mohan Raj and Innocent in supporting roles. The movie is remembered for the performance of K. P. A. C. Lalitha.

== Plot ==
Narayanan, commonly known as Nathu Narayanan, is a local rowdy. One day, Bhaskaran Nair, a house owner seeks his help in order to evacuate his rented house. He is not able to find Narayanan, and asks his friend Ramu, who repudiates Bhaskaran Nair for trying to drag Narayanan into a life of crime. Bhaskaran Nair goes home after he is not able to find Narayanan. Narayanan shows up at his home at night and agrees to evacuate his home. Next day, Narayanan goes into the house and fights with the Nephew of the squatter Menon, scaring him. Eventually, the nephew runs away and Narayanan is able to free the house from the squatter. Bhaskaran Nair pays Narayanan some money, which he squanders very quickly.

Narayanan also gets some money to marry Omana, who is a house help.

Benny is an honest engineer who is unwilling to sign on the bills belonging to corrupt contractor Ayyappan Nair. Ayyappan Nair wants to put Benny in a hospital, so that the replacement can sign his bills. He goes to Karim Bhai for help, who asks Narayanan to do the job of breaking hands and legs of Benny. Narayanan manages to make Benny fall from his scooter using a rope on a bridge. But during the altercation that follows, he accidentally kills him by pushing him into a river from the top of a bridge. The death is declared as an accident.

Narayanan is repentant, and starts helping Asha, the wife of Benny. One day, he accidentally goes to her workplace drunk, and explains how his father also was killed by someone the same way and his mother didn't take care of him afterwards.

Asha, who was already suspicious about the death of Benny, decides to give a petition to the police for a new enquiry. Police finds the rope used to trip Benny from his scooter.

Narayanan informs this to Ayyappan Nair and goes hiding. Karim Bhai says to Ayyappan Nair that if Narayanan is caught by the police, he could lead the police to Karim Bhai and Ayyappan Nair. Therefore, he decides to kill Narayanan.

Karim Bhai goes to Ramu's home and attacks him. Narayanan decides to surrender after seeing Asha once. But while going to her house, he is attacked by Karim Bhai. Narayanan eventually manages to overpower Karim Bhai and choke him to death with his belt.

The film ends when Narayanan goes to Asha's house and falls on her feet, begging for forgiveness.

== Cast ==
- Mammootty as Nathu Narayanan
- Murali as Ramu
- Jayaram as Benny
- Urvashi as Asha
- K. P. A. C. Lalitha as Omana, accidentally Nathu's wife
- Innocent
- Sankaradi
- P. P. Subair
- M. S. Thripunithura
- Mamukkoya as Moideen
- Meena as Benny's mother
- Mohan Raj as Karim Bhai
- Oduvil Unnikrishnan as Ayyappan Nair
- Paravoor Bharathan
- Shari as Ramu's wife
- T. P. Madhavan
- Beena Antony
- Thesni Khan
- Bheeman Raghu as Thomas Kutty

== Soundtrack ==
The music was composed by Johnson and the lyrics were written by Kaithapram.

No.	Song	Singers	Lyrics
1	"Chethikkinungi"	K. J. Yesudas	Kaithapram
2	"Saanthwanam"	K. J. Yesudas	Kaithapram
