= Koodum Thedi =

1985 Indian film

- Pre-release poster
- Directed by: Paul Babu
- Screenplay by: S. N. Swamy
- Story by: Rajmohan
- Produced by: Siyad Koker
- Starring: Mohanlal; Radhika; Rahman; Nadia Moidu
- Cinematography: P. C. Sreeram
- Edited by: T. R. Sekhar
- Music by: Jerry Amaldev (songs); Johnson (score)
- Production company: Kokers Films
- Distributed by: Central Pictures
- Release date: 19 July 1985
- Country: India
- Language: Malayalam

Koodum Thedi (transl. In search of a nest) is a 1985 Indian Malayalam-language romantic drama film directed by Paul Babu (in his directorial debut) and written by S. N. Swamy and produced by Siyad Koker through Kokers Films. It stars Mohanlal and Radhika, along with Rahman, Nadia Moidu, M. G. Soman, Thilakan, Sankaradi in supporting roles. The film features original songs composed by Jerry Amaldev. The cinematography was done by P. C. Sreeram.

== Plot ==
Peter is a fun loving person and his younger brother is college going youth. Things go head over heels for Peter as he falls in love with Devi, a person who he is related to. But her brother plans for her to marry Jayakumar, who is a friend of Peter. Devi marries Jayakumar. One day, Jayakumar dies in an accident, but Devi plans to live her life as Jayakumar's widow without knowing Peter's love for her. Rest of the story, is how Peter tells Devi about his love and whether or not they marry.

== Cast ==
- Mohanlal as Peter Mathew
- Radhika as Devi
- Rahman as Rex Mathew
- Nadia Moidu as Judy
- Soman as Menon
- Roopa as Gracy
- Thilakan as Father
- Sreenath as Jayakumar
- Mala Aravindan as Vasuvettan
- Prathapachandran as Mathaikutty
- Bahadoor as Judy's father
- Jagathy Sreekumar as Lazar
- Sankaradi as Easow
- Sukumari as Sister
- Bhagyalakshmi

== Soundtrack ==
The film's songs were composed by Jerry Amaldev, with lyrics by M. D. Rajendran. The film score was composed by Johnson.

Track listing
No.	Title	Artist(s)	Length
1.	"Sangamam Ee Poonkaavanam"	Krishnachandran, Vani Jairam
2.	"Vaachalam En Mounavum"	K. J. Yesudas

== Release ==
Koodum Thedi was released on 19 July 1985 in 14 screens in Kerala. The film received good reports and box office collections, becoming a major commercial success.
