= Pattanapravesham =

- Theatrical release poster
- Directed by: Sathyan Anthikad
- Written by: Sreenivasan
- Produced by: Siyad Koker
- Starring: Mohanlal; Sreenivasan; Karamana Janardhanan; Ambika; Thilakan
- Cinematography: Vipin Mohan
- Edited by: K. Rajagopal
- Music by: Shyam
- Production company: Kokers Films
- Distributed by: Central Pictures
- Release date: 16 June 1988
- Running time: 158 minutes
- Country: India
- Language: Malayalam

Pattanapravesham (transl. Town Entry) is a 1988 Indian Malayalam-language detective comedy film directed by Sathyan Anthikad and written by Sreenivasan. It stars Mohanlal, Sreenivasan, Karamana Janardhanan, Ambika and Thilakan in the lead roles. It is a sequel to the 1987 film Nadodikkattu, with Mohanlal and Sreenivasan reprising their roles as Dasan and Vijayan. The film was produced by Siyad Koker under the banner of Kokers Films.

The film was a critical and commercial success. In 1990, Priyadarshan made a sequel titled Akkare Akkare Akkare.

== Plot ==
A smuggling gang is holding sway over Kochi, customs and police officials who try to catch them are brutally murdered. Ashoka Varma, an honest police officer, is murdered while trying to find evidence in the smuggling case. Following this, many police officials are reluctant to investigate the case, leading to political crisis. On the advice of a senior police official to utilise the talents of two famous Malayali boys who had arrested a smuggling gang in Madras and dealt with hired killers sent against them (the events of the prequel), the home minister appoints CID officers Ramdas (Dasan) and Vijayan to Kerala to find and solve the case.

Dasan and Vijayan are not capable or skillful but they pretend to be top detectives. During the course of an evening meal at a restaurant, Dasan overhears a conversation leading him to mistake Isaac and Prof. Vidyadharan, two bird watchers, as the murderers. Dasan and Vijayan follow Isaac but they are shot at and ambushed by a group of men. They are rescued by Prabhakaran Thampi, the boss of the smuggling gang. He pretends to be a philanthropic businessman involved in a lot of charity work.

They decide to focus on Isaac and go undercover as Mapilla umbrella repairmen to try to find him. While pretending to repair an umbrella, Vijayan's fake beard is spotted by a woman named Shobha. Suspecting them to be thieves, she raises the alarm but the duo escape. Next, Vijayan and Dasan dress up as parrot Tarot diviners. However, they are again discovered by Shobha, who raises the alarm. The locals catch them, beat them up and take them to the police. Eventually, Shobha learns the truth about them and they become friendly. They find out that Shoba's husband was a customs officer who was murdered just days before completing his probation, hence the government didn't give the family the "dying in harness" job.

Dasan and Vijayan tell their superiors and Prabhakaran that they know who the killer is and that they will make an arrest soon. This alarms Prabhakaran who sends masked men to attack them at home.

Vijayan goes undercover in disguise as a servant to Prabhakarans house which, coincidentally, is next to Isaac's house. Prabhakaran does not recognize him because of the disguise. At night, Vijayan sneaks out to get Isaac's blood but inhales chloroform accidentally and is unsuccessful. At midnight, a mysterious figure arrives at the house. This is Ananthan Nambiar, who is a close friend of Prabhakaran and who has broken out of jail. He seeks his help to get a fake passport so that he can leave the country. Nambiar is then sent to hide in his copra warehouse.

Dasan and Vijayan learn that Nambiar has broken out of jail and is searching for them. Both of them continue to try different ways of obtaining Isaac's blood but hilariously fail in their attempts. Isaac meanwhile suspects them as rival birdwatchers who have come to steal his research.

Prabhakaran restarts his drug smuggling operation. His lorry rams down a check point gate and the police chase them. Meanwhile, Dasan and Isaac end up in a tussle when the former tries to draw his blood while bird-watching. Dasan escapes in his Jeep. Isaac jumps into Thampi's lorry and throw out the men in it and follows Dasan, whose jeep gets damaged causing Dasan too to jump into the lorry. Isaac and he fight for control, but Dasan manages to escape with the lorry because Issac is distracted by the sound of the rare bullfinch that he has been looking for. The police follow the lorry and are surprised to see Dasan driving it. They are under the impression that Dasan has single-handedly overpowered the goons and seized the drug shipment and Dasan impishly takes the credit.

Prabhakaran is shocked about the seizure of his shipment. Isaac and Prof. Vidyadharan go after the elusive bullfinch which was observed on an island and by chance, their boarding point is exactly where Gafoorka plans to rendezvous with Nambiar to take him to a different country. Dasan and Vijayan follow Issac and Viyadharan and run into Gafoorka and Nambiar. Nambiar jumps into the lagoon and escapes. They rough Gafforka up and confiscate the money he had stolen from them in the prequel.

Thambi arranges Nambiar to escape to Tamil Nadu, but he recognises the driver Balan (from the prequel movie). Balan's family is kidnapped and he is forced to get close to his good friends Dasan and Vijayan and assassinate him. However, at the last minute, his conscience gets in the way of the deed and he tells them the truth about Thambi.

Nambiar informs Prabhakaran that the same CIDs who destroyed his smuggling business are the ones following him. They also see Isaac using binoculars and think that he works for the CIDs too. When they see Isaac leaving with a suitcase, they grab it from him thinking that it contains evidence against them. Vijayan and Dasan chase Thambi and his goons too.

Eventually, everyone including the CIDs arrive at the copra warehouse where there is huge free for all fight for the suitcase. Dasan and Vijayan realise that Prabhakaran and Nambiar are friends. They also realise that Isaac is a bird watcher and is not associated with the criminals. Issac, Dasan and Vijayan join forces and beat up and subdue the goons. The police arrive and Prabhakaran, Nambiar and their gang are all captured. The Kerala government felicitate the CIDs for successfully solving the case. Shoba gets the dying in harness job from the government.

== Cast ==
- Mohanlal as CID Ramdas / Dasan
- Sreenivasan as CID Vijayan / Thankappan
- Karamana Janardanan Nair as Prabhakaran Thampi / Copra Prabhakaran
- Thilakan as Ananthan Nambiar / IbrahimKutty
- N. L. Balakrishnan as Isaac (Bird watcher 1)
- Innocent as Puthenpurackal Balan / Balettan
- Ambika as Shobha
- K. P. A. C. Lalitha as Shobha's mother-in-law
- Paravoor Bharathan as Prof. Vidyadharan (Bird watcher 2)
- Philomina as Prabhakaran Thampi's mother
- Oduvil Unnikrishnan as Home Minister Aravindakshan
- Rashid as Kunjukrishnan
- Azeez as Circle Inspector Santhosh
- Valsala Menon as Home Minister's wife
- Mamukkoya as Gafoorka
- Mala Aravindan as Damu
- Prathapachandran as DySP. Ashoka Varma
- Thodupuzha Vasanthi as Prabhakaran Thampi's wife
- Aloor Elsy as Prabhakaran Thampi's servant

== Soundtrack ==
The film features songs composed by Shyam, with lyrics by Yusufali Kechery.

| No. | Title | Artist(s) | Length |
|---|---|---|---|
| 1. | "Saubhaagyam" | Cochin Ibrahim, Satheesh Babu |
| 2. | "Shishirame Nee" (Female) | K. S. Chithra |
| 3. | "Shishirame Nee" (Male) | Satheesh Babu |
