= Summer in Bethlehem =

1998 film by Sibi Malayil

- Poster
- Directed by: Sibi Malayil
- Written by: Ranjith
- Produced by: Siyad Koker (Kokers Films)
- Starring: Suresh Gopi; Jayaram; Mohanlal; Manju Warrier; Kalabhavan Mani
- Cinematography: Sanjeev Shankar
- Edited by: L. Bhoominathan
- Music by: Vidyasagar
- Production company: Kokers Films
- Distributed by: Anupama Release
- Release date: 4 September 1998
- Running time: 160 minutes
- Country: India
- Language: Malayalam

Summer in Bethlehem is a 1998 Indian Malayalam-language romantic comedy film directed by Sibi Malayil and written by Ranjith. It was produced by Siyad Koker under the company Kokers Films. The film stars Suresh Gopi, Jayaram, Manju Warrier, and Kalabhavan Mani. The music was composed by Vidyasagar. It tells the story of Ravishankar (Jayaram), the bumbling friend of a wealthy rancher, Dennis (Suresh Gopi), and the vacation visit by Ravishankar's relatives in Dennis' estate known as Bethlehem Estates in a fictional town of Chandragiri in the Nilgiris.

The film was released on 4 September 1998. It was partially remade in Tamil as Lesa Lesa (2003), directed by Priyadarshan who opined that the movie was inspired by the two American movies - Fiddler on the Roof and Come September.

== Plot ==
Ravishankar, an unsuccessful investor, stays with his best friend Dennis, a wealthy rancher who owns a successful dairy farming business. Dennis has a vast ranch named Bethlehem and hundreds of cattle in a valley. Ravi is a fun-loving, jovial chap who has fabricated stories of his success to his parents, grandparents, and relatives.

During a vacation, Colonel C.R. Menon, his grandfather and grandmother arrive with their extended family to spend a couple of days at Ravishankar's farmhouse. Ravi successfully makes them believe that he is the real owner of Bethlehem and that Dennis is just his working partner. Dennis, who is an orphan, is happy to meet a huge family and generously welcomes them. Colonel Menon plans to get Ravi married to one of his granddaughters. Ravi is a bit confused about whom he should choose. To make matters complicated, he has been receiving gifts and messages from one of the five girls expressing her love for him. Meanwhile, a few days after they arrive at Bethlehem, Abhirami, another granddaughter of Menon, studying in Bangalore, arrives alone. She seems to be too upset and worried. But within a short period, she calms down and starts enjoying the vacation. During their stay, Ravi and Dennis decide to discover the girl who had been teasing them with cryptic messages.

Dennis begins suspecting Abhirami of being the sender but she informs him that she is not and that she would help them in finding the person. She asks around among her cousins but everyone denies being the sender. However, Dennis begins to fall for her, and to make matters complicated, Ravi confesses to him that he plans to propose to Abhirami. To avoid any unpleasant situation, Dennis hides his true feelings from everyone.

Colonel Menon and his wife approve of Ravi and Abhirami's relationship but upon knowing this, Abhirami snubs them by declaring that she is in love with Dennis. Her decision creates panic among all as they believe that Dennis is a failed businessman who is living at the expense of Ravishankar. Ravi shocks everyone by revealing that Dennis is the actual owner of Bethlehem and that he is more than happy to see Abhirami marrying Dennis. Abhirami meets Dennis who is completely broken down after the chaos at the house. Dennis, at the same time, is happy at heart knowing about Abhirami's love for him. But she shocks him by saying that she was just using his name to escape the marriage. She tells Dennis that she is in love with Niranjan, a Naxal revolutionary in southern Karnataka. Niranjan, whom she met in Bangalore, is now in jail, convicted of killing Brijesh Mallaya, a business owner and his family. He is awaiting his death sentence in a couple of days and Abhirami has taken a vow not to marry anyone other than Niranjan.

Back home, upon the compulsion from Ravi, the family decides to get Abhirami married to Dennis. The night before the engagement, Abhirami requests Dennis to take her to jail to meet Niranjan for one last time. They meet Niranjan, who is a completely changed man. Remorseful Niranjan regrets the violent ways he adopted in class war and the crimes he committed to obtain a classless society. Niranjan advises Abhirami to forget him and accept Dennis as her husband. Abhirami refuses to take his words, but Niranjan forces Dennis to tie the thali to Abhirami, which she has brought with her. Dennis obeys Niranjan, marries Abhirami at the jail, and Niranjan witnesses it with tearful eyes.

A few days later, the family returns home, while Ravi jokingly reminds everyone that they should be back here next year to welcome junior Dennis. The train departs slowly and a girl's hand reaches out of the coach window, holding the kitten which was sent as a gift to Ravi before. Ravi takes off running to find out who it is, but he catches only a cryptic message that teases him to follow and discover her identity.

== Cast ==
- Suresh Gopi as Dennis
- Jayaram as Ravishankar
- Mohanlal as Niranjan Kumar (Guest appearance)
- Manju Warrier as Abhirami (Aami) (Cousin 1)
- Sangeetha as Jyothi (Cousin 2)
- Sreejaya Nair as Devika (Cousin 3)
- Mayoori as Gayathri (Cousin 4)
- Manjula as Aparna (Cousin 5)
- Kalabhavan Mani as Monayi
- Janardhanan as Rtd. Colonel C. R. Menon, Ravishankar's grandfather
- Sukumari as Ravishankar's grandmother
- V. K. Sreeraman as Balachandran, Aami's adopted father
- Reena as Abhirami's adopted mother
- Girija Preman as Ravishankar's mother
- Kalabhavan Rahman as courier agent
- Augustine as Appunni Nair
- Sadiq as Chandrappan, Police officer
- Sujitha as Ravishankar's cousin 6
- Dhanya Menon as Ravishankar's cousin 7
- Nivia Rebin as Ravishankar's cousin 8
- Krupa as Ravishankar's cousin 9
- Krishna K as Ravishankar's cousin 10
- Ala B Bala as Ravishankar's cousin 11
- Annsu Stephen as Ravishankar's cousin 12
- M. Renjith as Lawrence

== Production ==
The movie, Summer in Bethlehem was the second script written by Renjith for Sibi Malayil after Maya Mayooram.

In 2018, Sibi revealed the film was originally in Tamil with Prabhu as male lead along with Manju Warrier and Jayaram. However, the producer backed out of the film after an argument, and Siyad Kokker convinced Sibi to make the film in Malayalam. Suresh Gopi replaced Prabhu as the lead while Manju and Jayaram retained their roles.

== Soundtrack ==
The soundtrack of the film was composed by Vidyasagar and the lyrics were written by Gireesh Puthenchery. The soundtrack had seven songs, and it became one of the biggest hits in Kerala. Vidyasagar won Filmfare Award for Best Music Director for this film.

Song title	Singer(s)	Raga
"Ethrayo Janmamay" (Solo)	Sujatha	Kapi
"Oru Raathri Koodi"	Dr. K. J. Yesudas, K. S. Chithra	Abheri
"Ethrayo Janmamay"	Srinivas, Sujatha	Kapi
"Marivillin Gopurangal"	Srinivas, Biju Narayanan	
"Choolamadichu"	K. S. Chithra, Chorus	Vrindavana Saranga
"Oru Raathri Koodi"	Dr. K. J. Yesudas	Abheri
"Poonchillamel"	K. S. Chithra, Chorus	
"Kunnimani Koottil"	M. G. Sreekumar, K. S. Chithra	
"Confusion Theerkaname"	M. G. Sreekumar	Shanmukhapriya
"Oru Raathri Koodi"	K. S. Chithra	Abheri

== Release ==
The film was released alongside the Mammootty and Mohanlal starrer- Harikrishnans.

=== Reception ===
Jayalakshmi K. of Deccan Herald said that "A fun and family entertainer, even if dragging at times. There are songs, catchy tunes, dances with glamorous settings and backdrops, and a beautiful location which may set you on the trail of this Bethlehem in humara Bharat" (transl. Our India).

=== Box office ===
The film was a commercial success and the second highest-grossing Malayalam film of the year 1998.

== Controversy over Tamil remake ==
The producer of the film Siyad Koker accused Priyadarshan of remaking Summer in Bethlehem in Tamil without taking permission or purchasing the right. The Kerala Film Producers Association had banned the screening of all the films of Priyadarshan in the state at the time. Kokker alleged that Priyadarshan's Tamil film Lesa Lesa is an uncredited remake of Summer in Bethlehem. Priyadarshan refuted by alleging that Summer in Bethlehem itself is an uncredited remake of American films Fiddler on the Roof and Come September. The matter was later settled, with Priyadarshan paying ₹8 lakhs to Siyad and ₹3 lakhs each to Ranjith and Sibi Malayil.

== Legacy ==
The line of the song Maarivillin Gopurangal is inspired as a title of 2024 film.
