= Nadodikkattu =

- Film poster
- Directed by: Sathyan Anthikad
- Screenplay by: Sreenivasan
- Story by: Siddique-Lal
- Produced by: Century Kochumon; Mohanlal; I. V. Sasi; Mammootty
- Starring: Mohanlal; Sreenivasan; Shobana; Thilakan
- Cinematography: Vipin Mohan
- Edited by: K. Narayanan
- Music by: Shyam
- Production company: Casino Productions
- Distributed by: Century Films
- Release date: 6 November 1987
- Running time: 158 minutes
- Country: India
- Language: Malayalam
- Budget: ₹17 lakhs

Nadodikkattu (transl. The Nomad Wind) is a 1987 Indian Malayalam-language satirical comedy film directed by Sathyan Anthikad and written by Sreenivasan based on a story by the Siddique–Lal duo. It stars Mohanlal and Sreenivasan in the lead roles, along with an ensemble supporting cast featuring Shobhana, Thilakan, Innocent, Mamukkoya and Captain Raju. The story revolves around two impecunious young men, Ramdas and Vijayan who not being able to find any job in Kerala, plan to immigrate to Dubai to make their fortunes but get deceived and end up in Chennai. The film drew upon relevant social factors affecting Kerala of the 1980s such as widespread unemployment and poverty.

Critics consider the film represents popular Malayalam cinema at its satirical best and established the Mohanlal-Sreenivasan onscreen combination as one of its most memorable and bankable cinematic pairs. The story, screenplay and characters have achieved classic status. The film was produced by Casino Productions, a company owned by Century Kochumon, Mohanlal, I. V. Sasi, and Mammootty.

== Plot ==
Ramdas, known as Dasan, and Vijayan work as underpaid peons at a company. Dasan, who is proud of being a 'B-Com first class' graduate, constantly expresses his dissatisfaction over having to serve less qualified superiors and settling for less than what he believes he deserves in life. His only friend and less-educated roommate is Vijayan. Dasan always show insulting attitude due to his education and good looks, which severely irritates Vijayan. Their friendship is full of comic tension. Later in the movie, several humorous scenarios make use of this characteristic of the protagonists. Dasan frequently orders Vijayan to perform all of the housework.

When the new managing director starts working for their organization, Dasan and Vijayan eagerly await his appointment of leadership in the hopes of obtaining a better position. On the other hand, one day as they are leaving for work, they get into an unnecessary fight with an unidentified person. Dasan verbally criticizes the person and pushes him into a puddle of rainwater in an attempt to attract the attention of a lady. Vijayan punctures his car tires. When they get at work, they discover that the guy with whom they had chosen to fight is now their new managing director. Both disappear from their workplaces and then resurface the next day, Dasan donning a pair of dark sunglasses and Vijayan sporting a full beard. They both make an effort to persuade their boss that they were extremely ill the day before, but they are both forced to report to the new managing director. They succeed in duping him at first and begin to work, but the managing director quickly learns the truth from old office photos, and they are both fired.

Because they are unemployed, their landlord persuades them to take out a bank loan to purchase two cows. Positive about their new business venture, Dasan and Vijayan begin to see a prosperous future. They quickly learn, though, that the cows produce very little milk, and the enterprise fails. Due to their failure to make loan payments, the bank contacts them. To get away, Vijayan sells the cows and makes plans for them to travel to Dubai with the proceeds. They meet Gafoorka, who offers to take them on his native boat, a "Uru (boat)," to the Persian Gulf. Gafoorka informs them that although his boat is actually headed for California, it will detour past the coast of Dubai just for them. Along with teaching them a few Arabic words, Gafoorka gives them instructions on how to trick the authorities by dressing in traditional Arabic clothing, or thawb. Dasan and Vijayan begin to fantasize about the bright and rich life that awaits them.

On reaching the sea shore that Gafoorka identifies as Arabia, both swim to the shore and change into Arabian attire. Two strangers follow Dasan and Vijayan and forcefully exchange their suitcases. Confused, Dasan and Vijayan start exploring the city. They are surprised to see no Arabs in the city and soon find signboards in Tamil. They realize that they have been cheated by Gafoorka who has off loaded them in Chennai. Dasan and Vijayan check the suitcase and find drugs inside. They contact local police and hand over the suitcase. Meanwhile, the strangers who are actually gang members of Ananthan Nambiar a smuggler and underworld don, find out that they were mistaken. Ananthan Nambiar believes that those men in Arabic dress were Crime Investigation Department officers in disguise.

Dasan and Vijayan with the help of Dasan's taxi driver friend Balan, get jobs at Ananthan Nambiar's office. They rent a small house in the suburbs. Dasan meets his colleague Radha who turns out to be their neighbour as well. But soon Dasan and Vijayan get fired by Ananthan Nambiar who believes that they are undercover officers. On the road again, Vijayan tries to get a chance to act in films. He visits noted film director I. V. Sasi's home and meets Sasi's wife and actress Seema.

Dasan starts a small push-cart vegetable business with Radha's help. A minor romance develops between Dasan and Radha. In the colony, Kovai Venkatesan, a well-connected businessman/politician who is originally a Malayali, tries to forcibly evict the locals to make room for a new private hospital. Dasan and Vijayan stand up against this eviction, earning them the respect of the locals. Meanwhile, Ananthan Nambiar hires contract killer Pavanayi to murder Dasan and Vijayan. Pavanayi arrives at Chennai airport with a briefcase containing his ‘tools of trade’. He opens the box and displays various options for killing the targets: a bomb, a gun, a set of arrows and even a traditional Malappuram dagger. Very soon Pavanayi becomes an object of ridicule because of his boasting nature. However, Pavanayi dies while trying to kill Dasan and Vijayan. This irks Ananthan Nambiar even more and makes him all the more paranoid about these two "officers".

As the story proceeds to the climax, Dasan and Vijayan are called to a rundown factory by Kovai Venkatesan on the pretext of offering them a job, where he plans to kill them for ruining his plans to evict the poor people of the area. Dasan and Vijayan find themselves surrounded by Ananthan Nambiar's gang as well, the latter also having selected the location to finalize a drug deal. However, both gangs mistake each other as enemies and a mixed fight breaks out. Dasan and Vijayan manage to lock all the others inside the building as the police arrive and arrest everyone.

The movie concludes as Dasan and Vijayan get selected into the Tamil Nadu police as Crime Investigation Department officers and they along with Radha drive away in a jeep.

== Cast ==
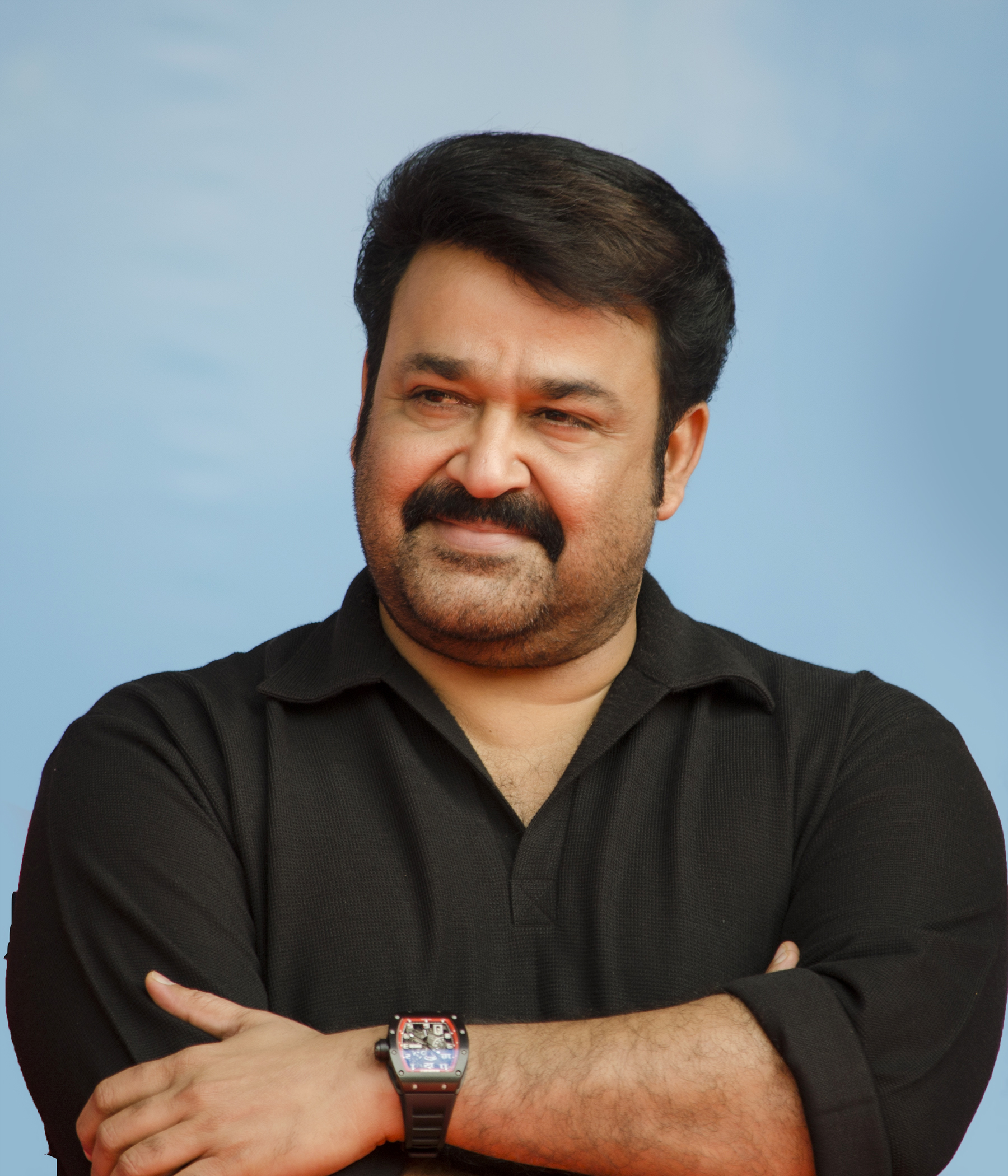
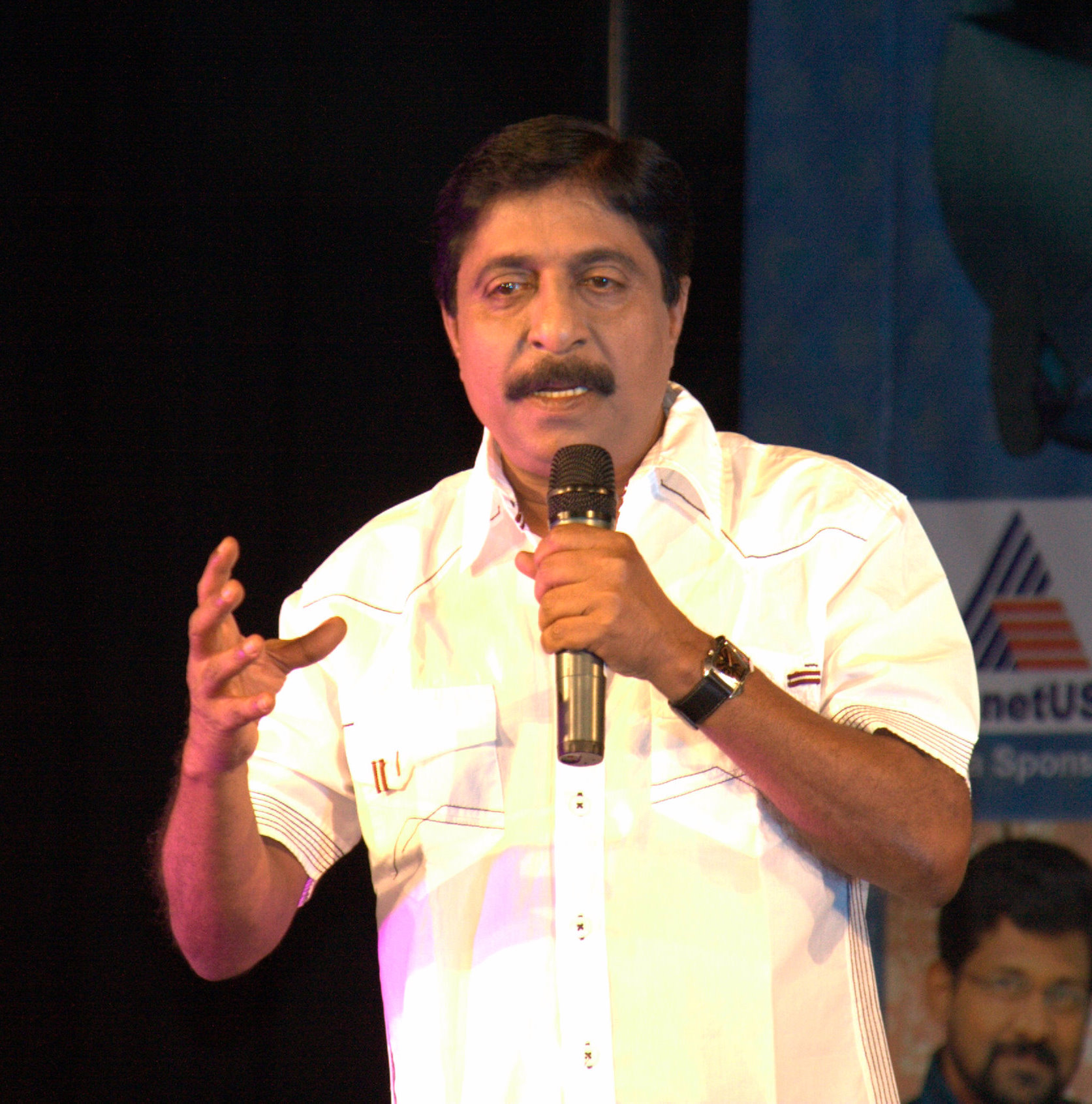
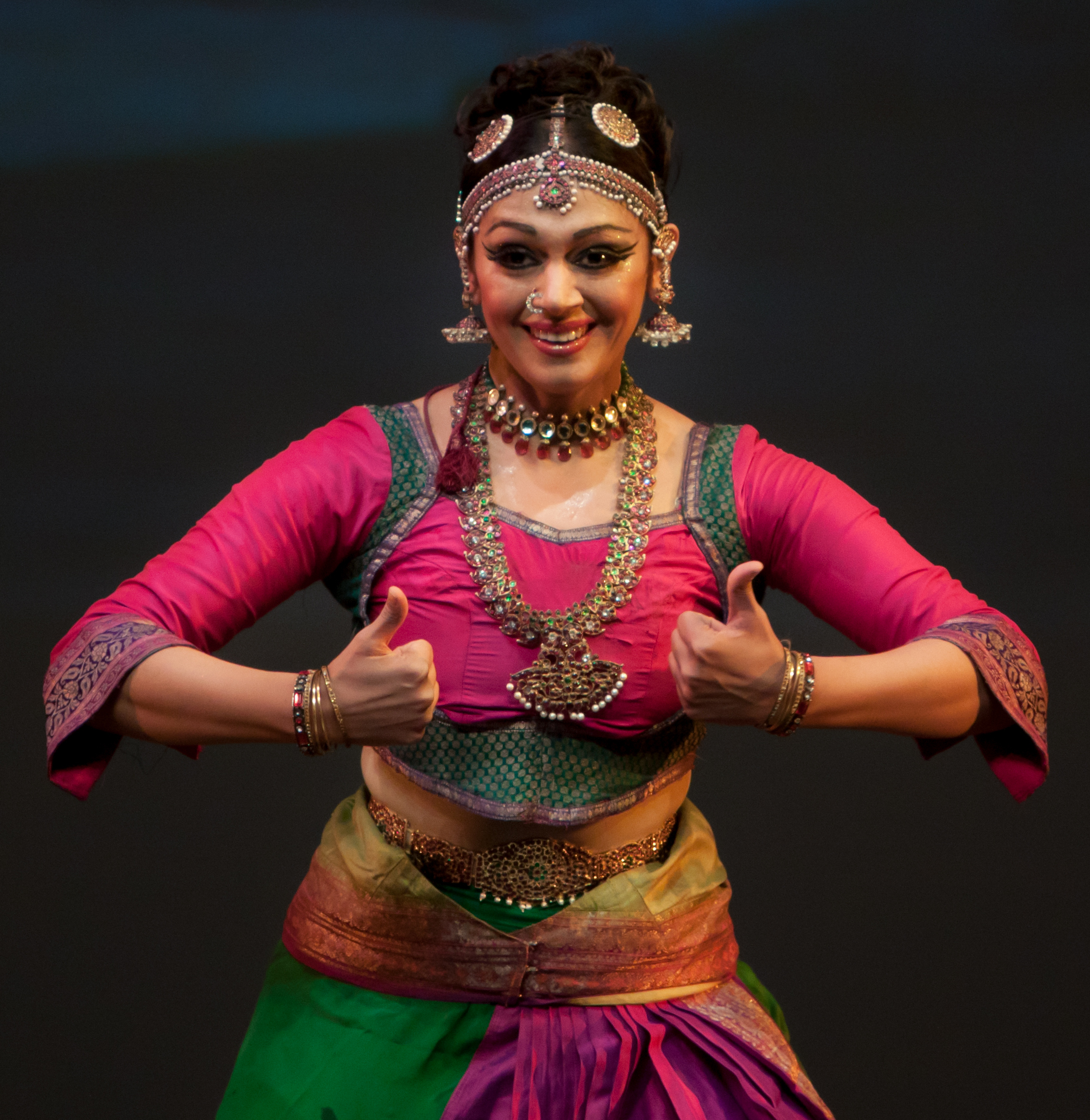
Mohanlal (Dasan) and Sreenivasan (Vijayan) played two struggling unemployed youth, while Shobana, played the female lead (Radha), love interest of Dasan

Principal cast

- Mohanlal as Dasan
- Sreenivasan as Vijayan
- Shobana as Radha
- Thilakan as Ananthan Nambiar
- Innocent as Balan aka Balettan
- Janardhanan as Kovai Venkatesan
- Captain Raju as P. V. Narayanan ("Pavanayi")
- Mamukkoya as Gafoorka
- Meena as Lathika, Radha's mother
- Sankaradi as Ramankutty, House owner
- C.I. Paul as Cleetus, Police Inspector
- Kundara Johny as Varghese (Nambiar's henchman)
- Ajith Kollam as Johny (Nambiar's henchman)
- Santha Devi as Ramdas' mother
- T. P. Madhavan as Mohanakrishnan, Managing Director
- Bobby Kottarakkara as Charlie, broker
- Kothuku Nanappan as Office Staff
- Rajan Padur as Milkman
- Vijayan Peringode as A. N. Traders Staff

Cameo appearances

- K. P. Ummer as Ashok IPS, DIG Tamil Nadu Police
- Seema as Herself
- I. V. Sasi as Himself
- M. G. Soman as Himself

== Production ==
The film was produced by Casino Productions, a film production house co-owned by Century Kochumon, Mohanlal, I. V. Sasi, Seema and Mammootty, on a shoe-string budget of Rs 17 lakh. Mammootty was initially considered for the role of Pavanai in the film.

The characters of Dasan and Vijayan were replicated from a story formulated by famous director duo Siddique and Lal who were working as assistant directors then. Sathyan Anthikkad discussed these characters to Sreenivasan who later developed them into a screen play. It was later revealed that Sathyan Anthikkad asked Sreenivasan to give a different treatment to the climax, thus they were able to come up with an agreeable climax for the script than that to the first version. Later they had creative differences during the same climax shooting and even stopped talking to each other. However, being best of friends, they re-united during dubbing of the film.

== Soundtrack ==
All lyrics are written by Yusufali Kechery; all music is composed by Shyam.

No.	Title	Artist(s)	Length
1.	"Karakana"	K. J. Yesudas and C. O. Anto	4:25
2.	"Vaisakha Sandhye" (Male)	K. J. Yesudas	4:09
3.	"Vaisakha Sandhye" (Female)	K. S. Chitra	4:09
Total length:			12:43

== Reception ==
When first released, Nadodikkattu received negative critical reviews, but favorable word-of-mouth publicity helped it to become a box office success. The film was a box office success, completing a 175-day run in theatres. The film was also well received in the Persian Gulf, where it had a 50-day theatrical run. The film grossed a total of ₹39,72,763 in 21 days from 501 shows.

== Legacy ==
Dialogues such as "Eda Vijaya? Enthada Daasa?","Namukku entha ee buddhi neretthe thonathathu?","Ellathinum Athindhedaaya Samayamundu Daasa", "Angane Pavanayi Shavamayi", "Eda Daasa, etha ee alavalathi?", "Hello Mr. Perera!", "Enthokke bahalam aayirunnu? Malappuram katthi, machine gun, bomb, olaykkadu moodu", and so on. These dialogues are still remembered fondly by Malayalis today and find their way into the daily conversation of Malayalees. This movie has been considered the best example of the Mohanlal-Sreenivasan on-screen combination, spawning two sequels with the same duo, Pattanapravesham and Akkare Akkare Akkare, as well as a spin-off film called Mr. Pavanayi 99.99.

The film was a breakthrough for Mamukkoya. The characters of Mamukkoya, Gafoorka and Captain Raju, Pavanayi enjoys a cult following in Kerala. The movie is considered one of the most popular Malayalam movies of all time. Even after more than 35 years, the movie draws huge audience whenever it is telecast on television channels. "The secret of the duo still being alive in the Malayali's consciousness may be because it's a story of two unemployed youngsters told using a humorous narrative. Unemployment was one of the biggest issues and migration to greener pastures was typical of Malayali experience. This has continued to the current decade. So, the audience has no problem relating to Dasan and Vijayan," says Sathyan Anthikkad, who directed the movie. According to Anthikkad, it was the convergence of a script-writer, director and actors at the subtlest level that resulted in its success.

"Comedies were not much in demand here before films such as Nadodikattu happened. Lal and I were instrumental in popularising comedies to a great extent." says Siddique.

The story and screenplay is considered one of the classics of mainstream Malayalam films, portraying a cross-section of Kerala's social issues at the time, primarily the struggle of unemployed Malayali youths and the means they pursue to find employment, such as seeking job opportunities in the Persian Gulf region, the scramble for formal educational qualifications (reflected through the character Ramdas' boasting about his graduate degree in commerce with First Class), etc., through amusing comic dialogues.

The movie dialogue was mentioned in the climax of 2024 Malayalam movie Varshangalkku Shesham directed by Vineeth Sreenivasan starring Pranav Mohanlal and Dhyan Sreenivasan

== Future ==
=== Sequel ===
The movie has two sequels:

- Pattanapravesham (1988)
- Akkare Akkare Akkare (1990).

=== Spin-off ===
A spin off of the film titled Mr. Pavanayi 99.99 was released on 2019 with Captain Raju reprising his role of Pavanayi.

=== Remakes ===
Title	Language	Year
Katha Nayagan	Tamil	1988
Chennapatnam Chinnollu	Telugu	1989
Tenali Rama	Kannada	2006
