= Akkare Akkare Akkare =

- Theatrical release poster
- Directed by: Priyadarshan
- Written by: Sreenivasan
- Produced by: G.P. Vijayakumar
- Starring: Mohanlal; Sreenivasan
- Cinematography: S. Kumar
- Edited by: N. Gopalakrishnan
- Music by: Ouseppachan
- Production company: G. P. Films
- Distributed by: Seven Arts Release
- Release date: 1990
- Running time: 150 minutes
- Country: India
- Language: Malayalam

Akkareyakkareyakkare, also known Akkare Akkare Akkare (transl. Over there, Over there, Over there) is a 1990 Indian Malayalam-language buddy cop comedy film directed by Priyadarshan and written by Sreenivasan. It stars Mohanlal, Sreenivasan, M. G. Soman, Mukesh, Maniyanpilla Raju, Parvathy and Nedumudi Venu in major roles. It is a sequel to 1987's Nadodikkattu and 1988's Pattanapravesham; Mohanlal and Sreenivasan reprises their roles. However, Thilakan, Mamukkoya and Innocent, who have appeared in the previous films, do not appear in this film. Also, a new cast of Nedumudi Venu, Sukumari, Parvathy Jayaram, Jagadish, Mukesh and Maniyanpilla Raju appears. M. G. Soman plays a character role, having appeared as himself in Nadodikkattu. The story follows C.I.Ds Dasan and Vijayan on an investigation for a gold crown stolen to the United States.

The film was produced by G. P. Vijayakumar and distributed by Seven Arts Release. It was filmed in Houston, Texas and the Greater Los Angeles Area, California, and Brooklyn, New York. The film did good business in the box office and was a profitable venture even though it had high production costs.

== Plot ==
When a priceless gold crown is stolen from India, Ramdas and Vijayan are sent to the United States to retrieve it. The only clue they have is the pseudonym "Paul Barber" and a piece of torn black shirt. With these couple of clues, the comic duo embark on the adventure. They arrive in Los Angeles and are mistaken to be smugglers and are taken by two gangsters to a building where other gang members try to murder them but they beat them up and escape. They are welcomed by Sivadasa Menon, an official of the Indian Embassy and a friend of the Police Commissioner Krishnan Nair. The investigation is funded by the Tamil Government with funds being periodically released by Sivadasan Menon.

Meantime a thief, Peter (Jagadish) is shown to have the crown in his custody which he quietly hides in the tank of an Indian Nurse Sethulakshmy (Parvathy). Peter is immediately killed by Paul Barber but the crown is missing as Peter had stashed it in Sethulakshmy's house.

Dasan and Vijayan suspect Sivadasa Menon to be the thief and the real Paul Barber when he refuses to give them money for their investigation and also refuses to help Vijayan who was arrested by the police due to a misunderstanding caused by the shopkeepers who understand only English. Their suspicion grows when they hear him talking to his wife about selling their Crown TV and buying a new one, but believe he was talking about selling the stolen crown to erase evidence. They overhear him at night commanding his wife to tailor clothes, but they believe he is murdering someone by forcing them to cut their hands, neck and ribs. They tell him they have withdrawn from the investigation and spent all the money he gave for enjoying themselves so that Sivadasan Menon does not hurt them. They believe that the piece of black shirt with them is his. They decide to get the rest of the shirt. Sivadasa Menon who is furious reports the same to the HQ which results in Commissioner Krishnan Nair getting suspended.

They disguise themselves as black laundry men to find the remnant of the black cloth from Menon's home, but their attempts fail when Vijayan talks Malayalam. Vijayan gets a job in the nearby laundry shop to search for the torn shirt but ends up getting beaten up at the laundry shop and ends up in the hospital. Both Dasan and Vijayan are attracted and try to seduce a nurse Sethulakshmy who is working in the same hospital and tending to Dasan's injury. The real criminal, an American gangster Paul Barber "Wilfred" believes two innocent men Surendran and Gopi are Dasan and Vijayan, they are forced out of their paying guest accommodation and all their acquaintances avoid them. Commissioner Krishnan Nair arrives in the United States after getting suspended. He plans to kill Dasan and Vijayan so that he state they were killed during the investigation and get back in the force. Surendran and Gopi become very desperate after their bank accounts are frozen and decide to steal to live. Krishnan Nair enters a hotel disguised as a Filipino man Akira Kurosawa. Surendran and Gopi steal his suitcase and he follows them, but he is misidentified by the hotel staff and they force him out. He catches them and they reveal how they have been treated. The trio decide to kill Dasan and Vijayan, but all their attempts fail.

Surendran and Gopi while being chased by Barbers gang inadvertently finds the crown hidden in Sethulakshmy's house. They unknowingly drop the crown while being chased which is found by Vijayan. Vijayan apparently furious with Dasan for trying to woo Sethulakshmy whom he met in the hospital wants to get even by claiming the glory singlehandedly by leaving Vijayan. He hides the crown and leaves the house under a false pretext. Surendran and Gopi make their way to Dasan and narrate him the whole story and Dasan discovers that Vijayan has found the crown and plans to singlehandedly claim credit. Dasan follows Vijayan who is unknowingly being followed By Krishnan Nair and Paul Barber. The whole situation culminates into a hilarious chase with Barber's gang attacking Dasan, Vijayan, Menon and Nair at an airstrip where Nair ends up decimating Barber and his gang totally but fearing punishment sneaks out before the American Police arrives.

Dasan and Vijayan manage to show their identity to the American Police and the retrieve the crown. Dasan and Vijayan are then felicitated by the Indian govt for once again cracking another case successfully.

== Cast ==
- Mohanlal as Ramdas / Dasan
- Sreenivasan as Vijayan
- M. G. Soman as City Police Commissioner Krishnan Nair IPS / Akira Kurosawa
- Mukesh as Surendran
- Maniyanpilla Raju as Gopi
- Nedumudi Venu as Sivadasa Menon
- Parvathy as Sethulakshmi
- Sukumari as House Owner
- K. P. A. C. Lalitha as Sivadasa Menon's Wife
- Jagadish as Peter
- Prameela as Krishnan Nair's Wife
- Anil Pillai as Kuriakose

== Production ==
Akkare Akkare Akkare is one of the first Malayalam films to be shot in the United States. The various filming locations were in,

- O'Hare International Airport, Chicago, Illinois
- Bellaire Hospital, Houston, Texas
- Port of Long Beach, Long Beach, California
- Disneyland, Anaheim, California
- Six Flags Magic Mountain, Valencia, Santa Clarita, California
- Foreign consulate in New York City, New York

The film was also shot in the city of Burbank, California.

== Music ==
The music composition was done by Ouseppachan. Background music Shyam (composer). The audio songs were released by the label J. S. Audio.

All lyrics are written by Sreekumaran Thampi.

Track list
No.	Title	Artist(s)	Length
1.	"Kannukannil"	M. G. Sreekumar, Unni Menon, Jojo
2.	"Swargathilo"	M. G. Sreekumar, Unni Menon, Jojo

== Cultural references ==
"Don't Let It End" by Styx plays in the backdrop when Dasan and Vijayan come down the escalator at the Chicago Ohare International Airport

== Legacy ==
The dialogue "Sadhanam Kayyilundo" from the film came as a popular catchphrase in Malayalam. As well as "Meenaviyal Enthayo Entho", the popular one-liner delivered by Sreenivasan found place in Printed T-shirts.
