= Sajan K. Mathew =

Indian film director

Sajan Alummoottil
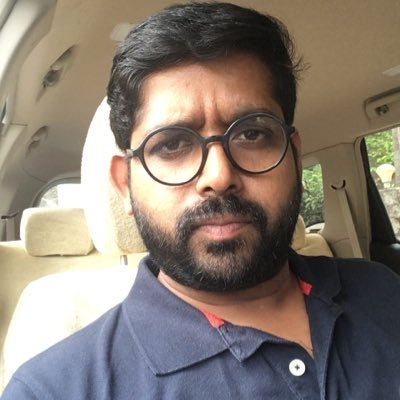
- Born: 12 March 1981 (age 44); Pathanapuram, Kerala, India
- Occupation: Film Director
- Years active: 2010- present

Sajan K Mathew (born 12 March 1981) is an Indian film director who works in Malayalam films. He began his film career as an ad-film maker; later worked in some movies as Assistant director. Sajan Mathew made his directorial debut Oru Murai Vanthu Parthaya in 2016.

== Career ==
Sajan Alummoottil started his career in films with director Deepu Karunakaran. He assisted Vasudev Sanal in God's own Country (2014) and Dileesh Nair in Tamaar Padaar (2014). Oru Murai Vanthu Parthaya(2016) was his directoral debut.

== Filmography ==
Year	Film	Language	Credited as
2014	God's Own Country	Malayalam	Assistant Director
2014	Tamaar Padaar	Malayalam	Assistant Director
2016	Oru Murai Vanthu Parthaya	Malayalam	Director
2022	Vivaha Aavahanam	Malayalam	Director
