= Oru Murai Vanthu Parthaya (film) =

Oru Murai Vanthu Parthayaa
- Theatrical release poster
- Directed by: Sajan K Mathew
- Written by: Abhilash Sreedharan
- Produced by: Siyad Koker
- Starring: Unni Mukundan; Sanusha; Prayaga Martin
- Cinematography: Dhanesh Raveendranath
- Edited by: Bibin Paul Samuel
- Music by: Vinu Thomas
- Production company: Kokers Films
- Distributed by: Kokers Release; Kalasangham Films
- Release date: 27 May 2016
- Running time: 150 minutes
- Country: India
- Language: Malayalam
- Budget: ₹3.5 crore
- Box office: ₹8 crore

Oru Murai Vanthu Parthaya is a 2016 Indian Malayalam black comedy horror drama film directed by Sajan K Mathew. The film stars Unni Mukundan, Sanusha, and Prayaga Martin in lead roles. It narrates the story of a spirit (Prayaga) entering a youngster's (Mukundan) life to avenge her death. The film is produced by Siyad Koker through Kokers Films. It was released on 27 May 2016. The title of the film is derived from a song in the film, Manichitrathazhu.

== Plot ==
Prakashan is an electrician who is a compassionate wrestler in Mallapuram village. Hailing from a family that follows tradition and superstitions, his mother, Sushila, often consults with an astrologer, Manoj, about Prakashan's marriage. Manoj knows about Prakashan's interest in Ashwathy. Manoj's friends, Kochukuttan, Kuriachan, Sankunni, and Shivan, help Prakashan in this matter.

The village's wrestling champion, Kunjachan, challenges Prakashan to fight. He happens to meet Parvathy while returning home. She pleads with him for a place to stay that night since her relatives are not available. Prakashan brings Parvathy to his house. His mother started treating Parvathy as her "daughter-in-law" though Prakashan narrated the truth. As days pass, he falls in love with her. Eventually, Prakashan defeats the wrestling champion, Kunjachan. While proposing his love to her, Prakashan is shocked to know that Parvathy is a ghost, and his friends also confirm the same.

Palani Ashan, a renowned tantric expert found that Prakashan and Parvathy were lovers in the past life. His past life father (who is Manoj's friend Shivan in this life) killed her through his aide. She tries to exact revenge on the people who killed her.

After that, Parvathy insists Prakashan to marry Aswathy. Prakashan and Aswathy get married. Parvathy forgives her killer and leaves without completing her revenge.

== Cast ==
- Unni Mukundan as Prakashan
- Sanusha as Ashwathy
- Prayaga Martin as Parvathy
- Sadiq as Shivan
- Bindu Panikker as Susheelamma
- Prasanth Alexander as Kuriachan
- Aju Varghese as Manoj
- Narayanankutty as Kunjammavan
- Sudhi Koppa as Kochukuttan
- Suraj Venjaramoodu as Ghost hunter Suni
- Abraham Koshy as Ashwathy's father
- Kochu Preman
- Seema G. Nair as Ashwathy's mother
- Bijukuttan as Sankunni
- Balaji Sarma as Kunjachan
- Jayaprakash Kuloor as Palani Ashan
- Sabumon Abdusamad as Sukumaran
- Resmi Anil as Prasanna
- Tini Tom
- Disney James as S.I. Benjamin G.V.

== Music ==
No.	Title	Lyrics	Singers
1	"Muzhuthinkal Vannilthanka"	K. R. Narayanan	Vineeth Sreenivasan
2	"Arikil Pathiye"	Abhilash Sreedharan	Najim Arshad, Sangeetha Sreekanth
3	"Ariyathe"	K. R. Narayanan	Cicily

== Box office ==
The film was a hit at the box office collecting eight crores and completed 50 days in its theatrical run. The film grossed 1.27cr in its opening weekend.
